= Pomerania in the early modern period =

Pomerania in the early modern period covers the history of Pomerania in the 16th, 17th, and 18th centuries.

The name Pomerania comes from Slavic po more, which means "[land] by the sea".

The Duchy of Pomerania was fragmented into Pomerania-Stettin (Farther Pomerania) and Pomerania-Wolgast (Western Pomerania) in 1532, underwent Protestant Reformation in 1534, and was even further fragmented in 1569. In 1627, the Thirty Years' War reached the duchy. Following the Treaty of Stettin (1630), it was under Swedish control. During the war, the last duke Bogislaw XIV died without an issue. Garrison, plunder, numerous battles, famine and diseases left two thirds of the population dead and most of the country ravaged. In the Peace of Westphalia of 1648, the Swedish Empire and Brandenburg–Prussia agreed on a partition of the duchy, which came into effect after the Treaty of Stettin (1653). Western Pomerania became Swedish Pomerania, a Swedish dominion, while Farther Pomerania became a Brandenburg–Prussian province.

A series of wars affected Pomerania in the following centuries. As a consequence, most of the formerly free peasants became serfs of the nobles. Brandenburg–Prussia was able to integrate southern Swedish Pomerania into her Pomeranian province during the Great Northern War, which was confirmed in the Treaty of Stockholm in 1720. In the 18th century, Prussia rebuilt and colonised her war-torn Pomeranian province.

Throughout this time, Pomerelia was within Poland as province of Royal Prussia with certain degree of autonomy until 1569, when it was further integrated with Polish state. In the late 18th century, it was forcefully annexed by the Kingdom of Prussia in the Partitions of Poland and subjected to Germanization efforts.

== Polish Pomerelia (1454/1466–1793) ==
Pomeranian Voivodeship within the Polish–Lithuanian Commonwealth

During the Thirteen Years' War, in February 1454, the Prussian Confederation of cities and gentry trying to secede from the Teutonic Knights' monastic state, asked the Polish king for support against the Teutonic Order's rule and for incorporation of into the Polish kingdom. The war ended in October 1466 with the Second Peace of Thorn, in which the Order recognized the incorporation of Pomerelia, Chełmno Land, Warmia and parts of Prussia into the Kingdom of Poland. Pomerelia became the Pomeranian Voivodeship within the larger provinces of Royal Prussia and Greater Poland Province. In 1613 Skarszewy became capital of the Pomeranian Voivodeship.

Royal Prussia enjoyed a certain degree autonomy in its affiliation to the Crown of Poland – it had its own Diet, treasury and monetary unit and armies. It was governed by a council, subordinate to the Polish king, whose members were chosen from local lords and wealthy citizens. Prussians had also seats provided for them in Polish Diet, but they chose not to use this right until the Union of Lublin. According to Zygmunt Gloger, during the rule of Sigismund III Vasa, Gdańsk was one of the two largest cities of Poland (alongside Kraków), and one of the three largest cities in Slavic countries (alongside Kraków and Prague).

Gdańsk was visited by Nicolaus Copernicus in 1504 and 1526, and Narratio Prima, the first printed publication of his heliocentric theory, was published there in 1540. Grudziądz was the place where Copernicus presented his Monetae cudendae ratio treatise, in which he postulated the principle that "bad money drives out good" which became known as the Gresham's law or the Gresham–Copernicus law. Around 1640, Johannes Hevelius established his astronomical observatory in Gdańsk, which was regularly visited by Polish King John III Sobieski.

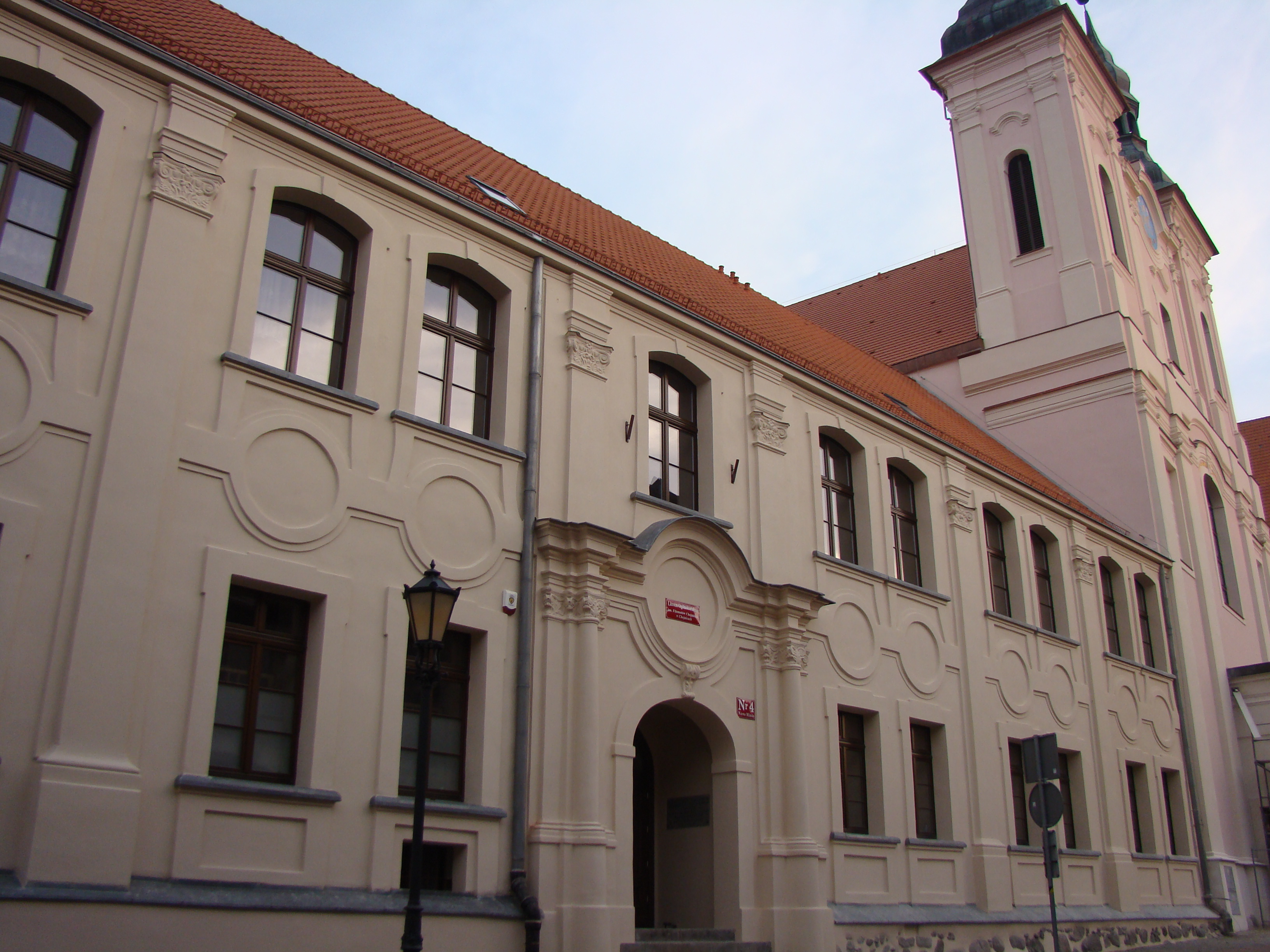
Liceum Ogólnokształcące im. Filomatów Chojnickich in Chojnice, one of the oldest high schools in Poland, est. in 1622

Chojnice was an important center of cloth production in Poland. Cloth production was the main branch of the town's economy, and in 1570, clothiers constituted 36% of all craftsmen in the town. To this day, one of the main streets in the town center is called Ulica Sukienników ("Clothiers' Street").

The significant Scottish diaspora in Poland, founded in Gdańsk in 1380, grew due to immigration, and in the 16th and 17th centuries was also noted in other towns of the region, including Biały Bór, Chojnice, Czarne, Człuchów, Debrzno, Gniew, Kościerzyna, Puck, Starogard, Świecie and Tczew.

During the Polish–Swedish War of 1626–1629, in 1627, the naval Battle of Oliwa was fought in the area, and it is one of the greatest victories in the history of the Polish Navy. The region was invaded by Sweden during the Swedish invasion of Poland of 1655–1660, commonly known as the Deluge, however, Gdańsk withstood a Swedish siege. In 1677, a Polish-Swedish alliance was signed in the city.

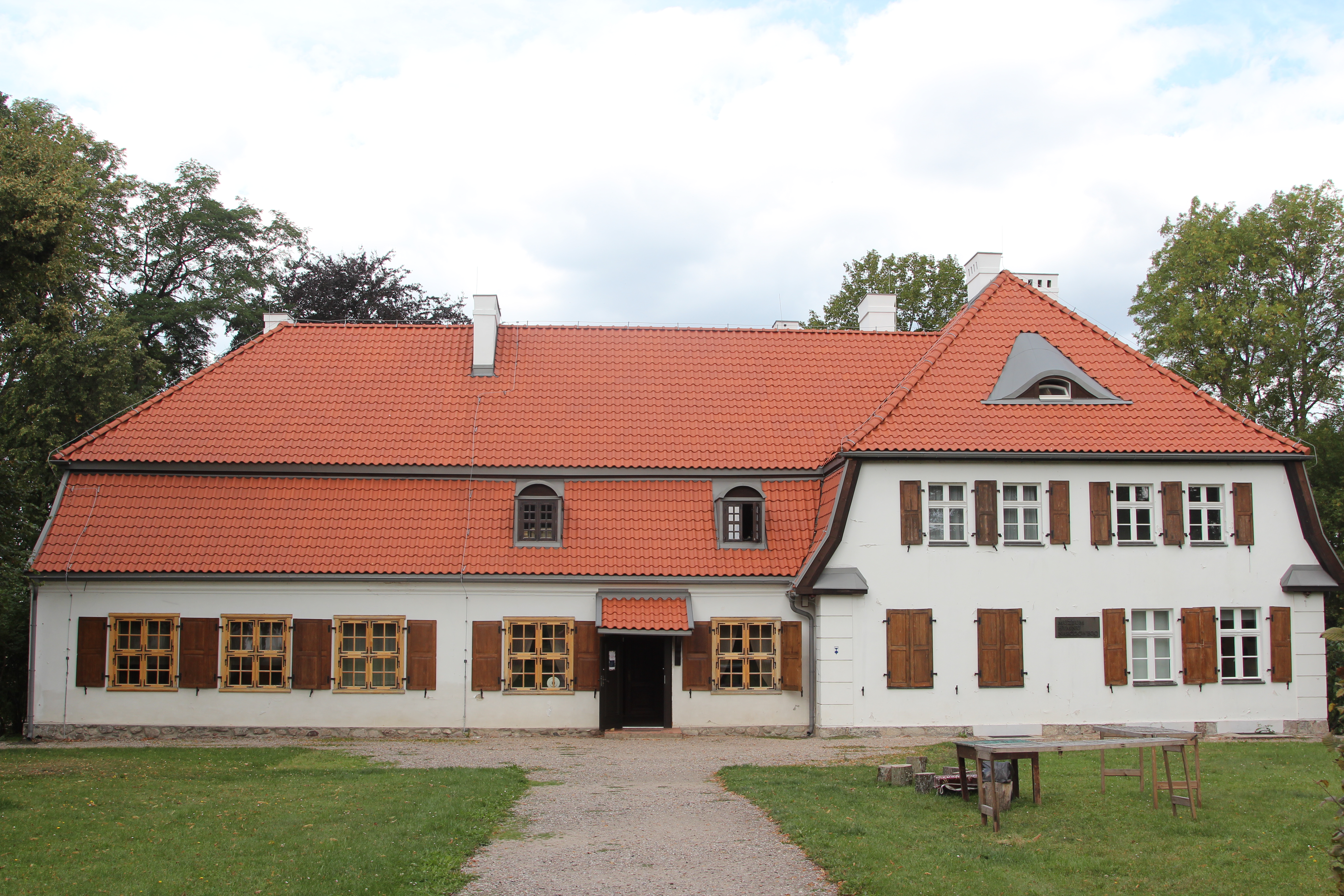
Birthplace and childhood home of Józef Wybicki in Będomin, now the Museum of the National Anthem of Poland

In 1587, Sigismund III Vasa swore the pacta conventa in Oliwa prior to his coronation as King of Poland. In the second half of the 17th century, prior to becoming King of Poland, John III Sobieski served as the starost of Gniew and built the Marysieńka Palace for his wife, Queen Marie Casimire, there. The future Polish King Stanisław August Poniatowski lived in Gdańsk until the age of 7, and his brother Michał Jerzy Poniatowski, who would become the Primate of Poland, was born in the city.

In 1686, a French Huguenot commune was established in Gdańsk.

Józef Wybicki, author of the lyrics to the national anthem of Poland, hailed from the region, as he was born in Będomin, attended a college in Stare Szkoty and studied law at the local court in Skarszewy.

In the 1772 and 1793 Partitions of Poland, it was annexed by the Kingdom of Prussia, which created out of the conquered territories the province of West Prussia.

== Protestant Reformation (1534) ==
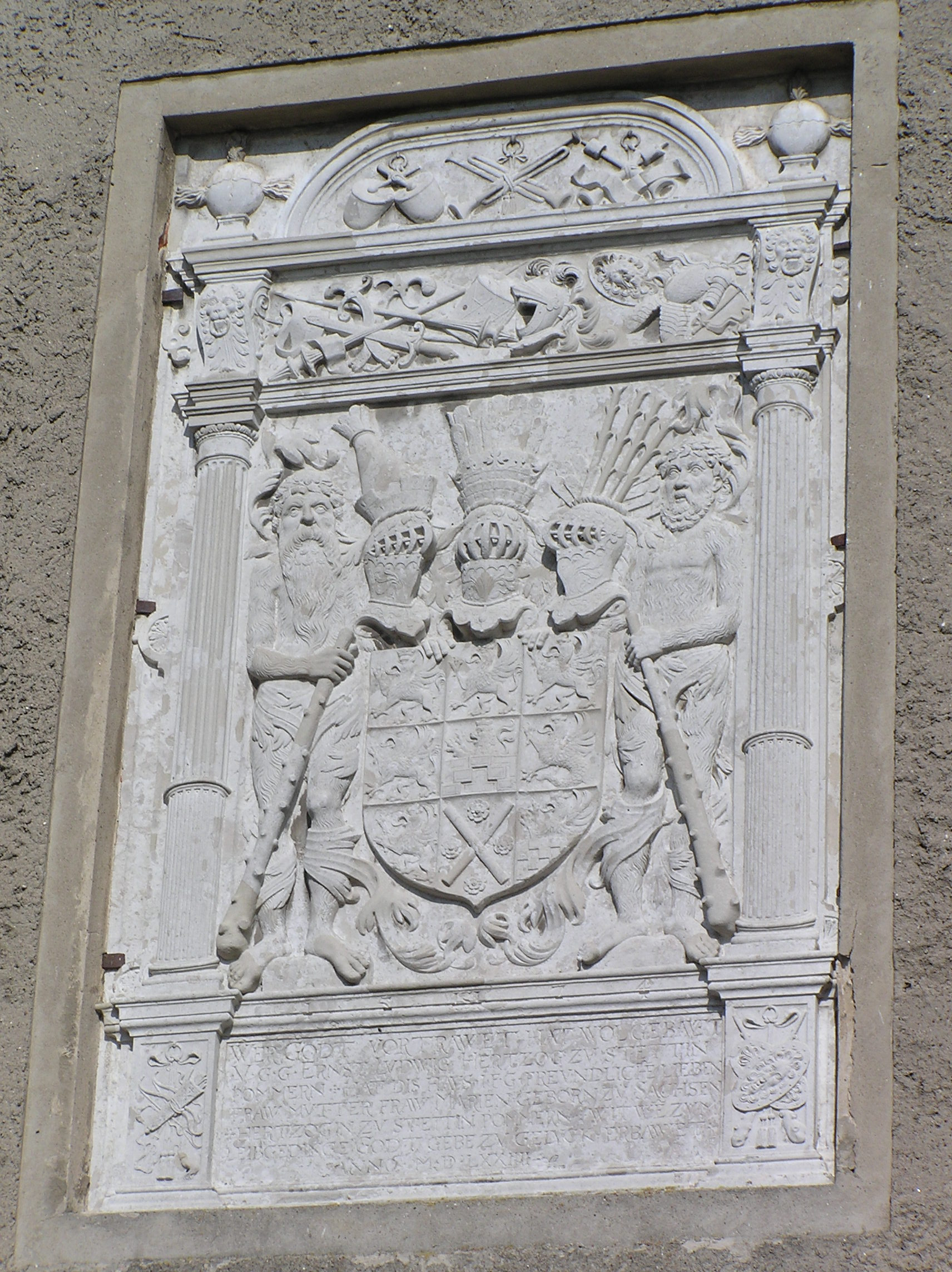
Coat of arms of the House of Pomerania at Pudagla palace, the secularized former Usedom Abbey

The Protestant Reformation reached Pomerania in the early 16th century. Bogislaw X of the Duchy of Pomerania in 1518 sent his son, Barnim IX, to study in Wittenberg. In 1521, he personally attended a mass of Martin Luther in Wittenberg, and also of other reformed preachers in the following years. Also in 1521, Johannes Bugenhagen, the Doctor Pomeranus, the most important person in the following conversion of Pomerania to Protestantism, left Belbuck Abbey to study in Wittenberg, close to Luther. In Belbuck, a circle had formed before, comprising not only Bugenhagen, but also Johann Boldewan, Christian Ketelhut, Andreas Knöpke and Johannes Kureke. These persons, and also Johannes Knipstro, Paul vom Rode, Peter Suawe, Jacob Hogensee and Johann Amandus spread the Protestant idea all over Pomerania. At several occasions, this went along with public outrage, plunder and arson directed against the church.

The dukes' role in the reformation process was ambitious. Bogislaw X, despite his sympathies, forbade Protestant preaching and tumults shortly before his death. Of his sons, Georg I opposed, and Barnim IX supported Protestantism as did Georg's son, Phillip I. In 1531, Georg died, and a Landtag in Stettin (Szczecin) formally allowed Protestant preaching, if no tumults would arise from this. On December 13, 1534, a Landtag was assembled in Treptow an der Rega (Trzebiatów), where the dukes and the nobility against the vote of Cammin (Kamień) bishop Erasmus von Manteuffel officially introduced Protestantism to Pomerania. Bugenhagen in the following month drafted the new Lutheran church order.

The Duchy of Pomerania joined the Schmalkaldic League, but did not actively participate in the Schmalkaldic War.

With the conversion of most Pomeranians to Lutheranism the Duchy of Pomerania turned into a Catholic diaspora. The Catholic Northern Missions took care of Catholic Pomeranians, directly subordinated to Congregatio de Propaganda Fide in Rome since 1622. In 1667 these missions were taken care by a newly established Vicariate Apostolic of the Northern Missions, led by a vicar apostolic seated in Hanover and subject to the nuncio in Cologne. Between 1709 and 1780 then Brandenburgian Pomerania was part of the Vicariate Apostolic for Upper and Lower Saxony.

In 1748 the first new post-Reformation Catholic congregations in Pomerania were founded in the course of King Frederick II's repopulation policy. Palatine Catholics were settled in the five newly founded villages of Augustwalde (Wielgowo, a part of today's Szczecin), Blumenthal (a part of today's Ferdinandshof), Hoppenwalde (a part of today's Eggesin), Luisenthal (Borzysławiec) and Viereck. Since 1761 Catholic soldiers in Swedish Stralsund were granted Catholic pastoral care, which developed into the fourth new Catholic congregation in Pomerania. The same happened in Stettin, where the post of the Prussian Catholic military chaplains became the nucleus of the Catholic congregation (est. in 1809). In 1780 the Vicariate for Upper and Lower Saxony remerged into the Vicariate Apostolic of the North, with the next crucial change for Catholic Pomerians taking place in 1824.

== Partitions of 1532 and 1569: Pomerania-Stettin and Pomerania-Wolgast ==
After Bogislaw X's death, his sons initially ruled in common. Yet, after Georg's death, the duchy was partitioned again between Barnim IX, who resided in Stettin (Szczecin), and Phillip I, who resided in Wolgast. The border ran roughly along the Oder and Świna rivers, with Pomerania-Wolgast now consisting of Hither or Western Pomerania (Vorpommern, yet without Stettin and Gartz (Oder) on the Oder river's left bank, and with Gryfice on its right bank), and Pomerania-Stettin consisting of Farther Pomerania. The secular possessions of the Diocese of Cammin (Kamień) around Kolberg (Kołobrzeg) subsequently came controlled by the dukes, when members of the ducal family were made titular bishops of Cammin since 1556.

Despite the division, the duchy maintained one central government.

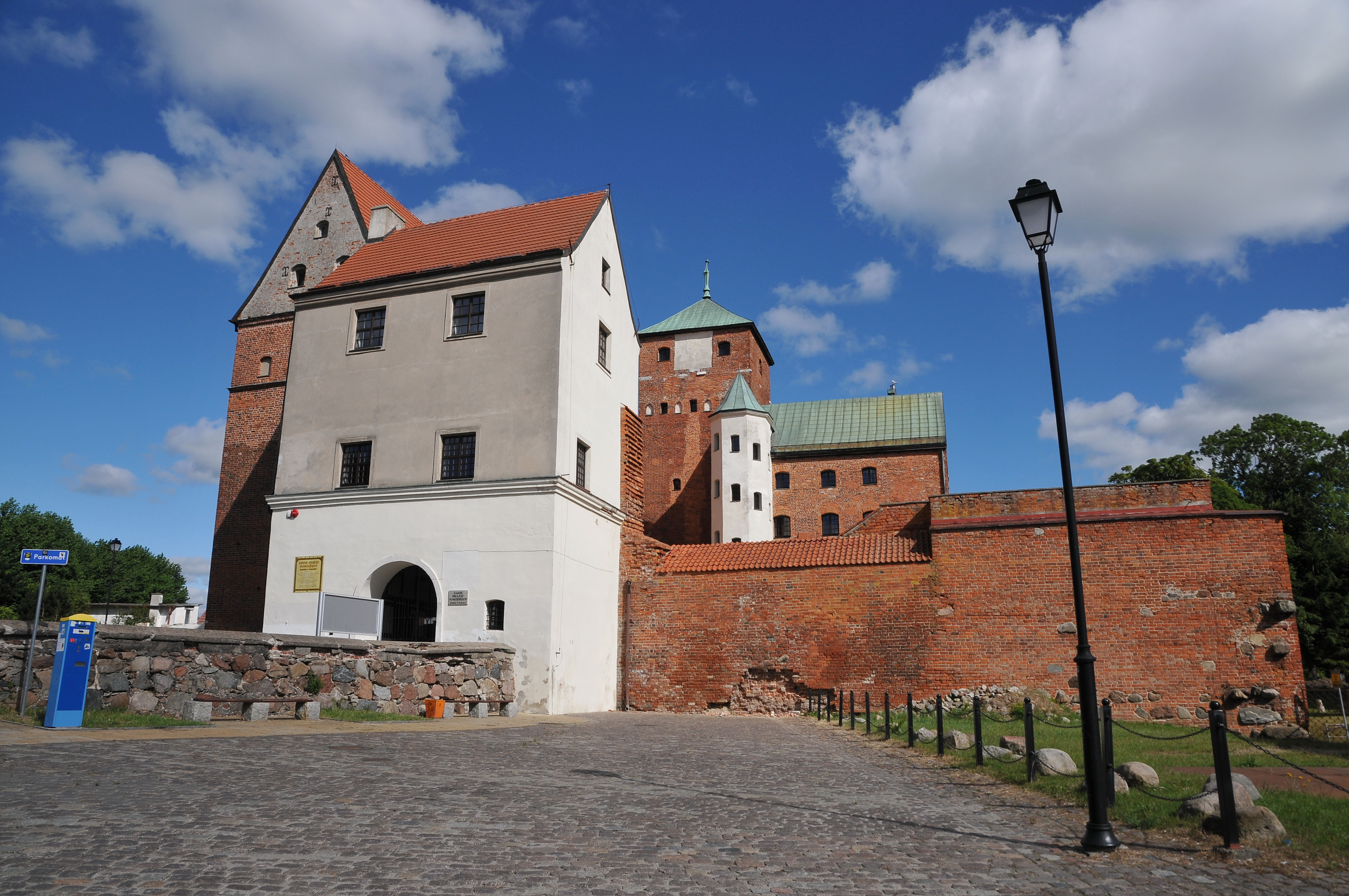
Darłowo Castle

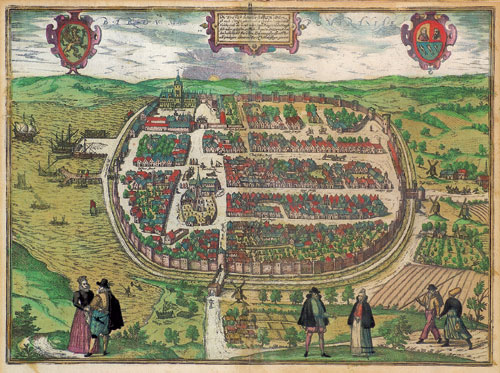
Barth with ducal palace in the upper left

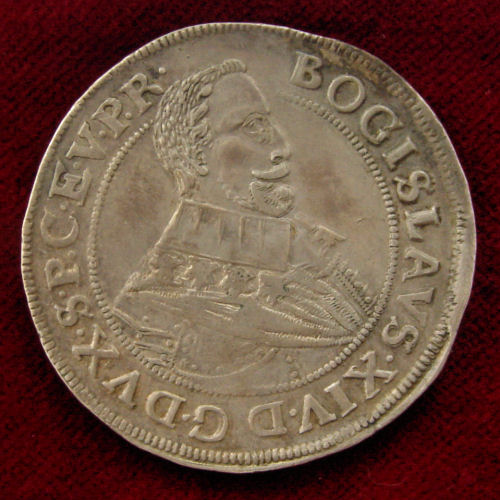
Coin showing Bogislaw XIV, the last duke of Pomerania

In 1569, Pomerania-Barth (consisting of the area around Barth, Damgarten and Richtenberg) was split off Pomerania-Wolgast to satisfy Bogislaw XIII. In the same year, Pomerania-Rügenwalde (consisting of the areas around Darłowo and Bytów) was split off Pomerania-Stettin to satisfy Barnim XII. Though the partitions were named similar to the earlier ones, their territory differed significantly.

In contrast to the partition of 1532, it was agreed that two governments were maintained in Wolgast and Stettin. Decisions of war and peace were to be made only by a common Landtag.

During the 1560s, Pomerania was caught between the Northern Seven Years' War for hegemony in the Baltic Sea and the struggle for hegemony in the Upper Saxon Circle of the Electorate of Saxony and Brandenburg. In 1570, the war in the Baltic ended with the Treaty of Stettin. In 1571/74, the duchy's status regarding Brandenburg was finally settled: While an agreement of 1529 ruled Brandenburg to succeed in Pomerania once the House of Pomerania died out in turn for the final rejection of Brandenburgian claims to hold Pomerania as a fief, it was now agreed that both ruling houses had a mutual right of succession in case of the extinction of the other one.

Also in 1571, a trade war between the towns Frankfurt (Oder) (Brandenburg) and Stettin (Pomerania), ongoing since 1560, was settled in favour of Brandenburg. The struggle within the Upper Saxon Circle however went on. The Pomeranian dukes John Frederick and Ernst Ludwig refused to pay their taxes to the circle's treasury (Kreiskasten in Leipzig) properly, and in the rare cases they did, they marked it as a voluntary act. Furthermore, the dukes ratified the circle's decrees only with caveats that made it possible for them to withdraw at any time. The Pomeranian dukes justified their actions with events of 1563, when an army led by Eric of Brunswick crossed and devastated their duchy, and the circle did not give them support. On the other hand, the Pomeranian refusal to properly integrate in the circle's structure likewise reduced the circle's ability to act as a unified military power.

The partitioned duchy underwent an economical recession in the late 16th century. The dukes' ability to control the inner affairs of the duchy severely declined in the course of the 16th century. As the central power was weakened by the partitions and increasingly indebted, the independence of nobles and towns rose. Attempts of duke Johann Friedrich to strengthen the ducal position, e.g. by introducing a general tax, failed due to the resistance of the nobility, who had gained the right to veto ducal tax decrees at the circle's convent. In 1594–1597, the duchy participated in the Ottoman Wars. Yet, due to the rejection of financial support by the nobility, the Pomeranian dukes' funds for the campaign were low, resulting in their humiliation during the war for fighting with bad horses and weapons. The 1637 death of the last Griffin duke Bogislaw XIV and the 1648 Peace of Westphalia marked the end of the duchy. Farther Pomerania came to Brandenburg and Hither or Western Pomerania to Sweden, both later made up the Province of Pomerania of the Kingdom of Prussia.

== Thirty Years' War (1618–1648) ==
The Duchy of Pomerania was occupied by imperial forces in 1627. A capitulation was signed in Franzburg, stating the terms of garrison and war contributions Pomerania had to provide.

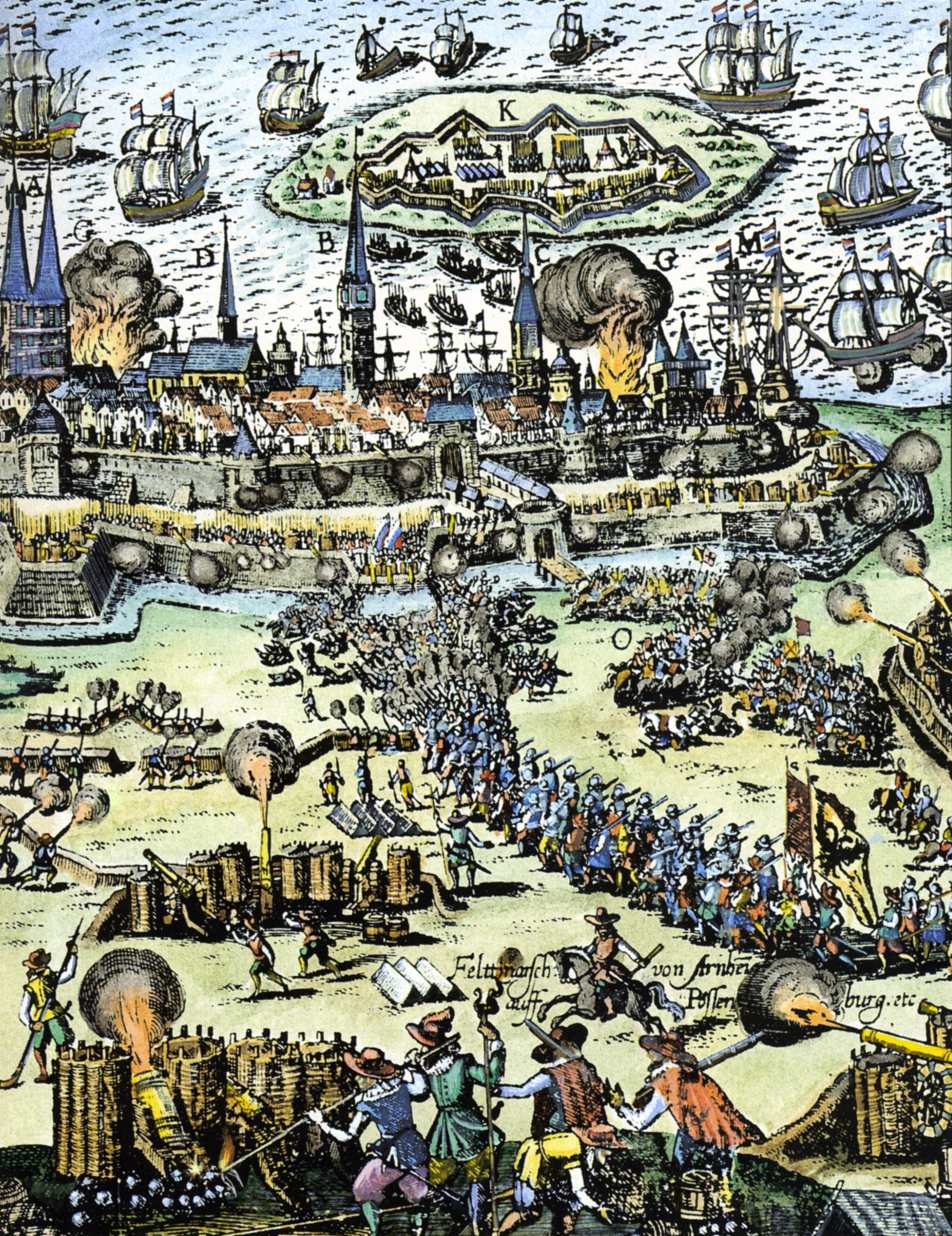
Siege of Stralsund (1628)

In 1628, Stralsund was besieged by Wallenstein, but withstood. Upon entering into the Thirty Years' War in 1629, the Swedish Empire, whose forces entered Pomerania near Peenemünde on July 26, 1630, gained effective control over Pomerania with the Treaty of Stettin (1630), though Imperial forces under Peruzzi held out in Greifswald until June 1631. Duke Bogislaw XIV and the nobility agreed in 1634 on a constitution proclaiming Protestantism as the duchy's religion "eternally". Bogislaw also handed the vast estates of secularized Eldena Abbey over to the University of Greifswald.

In 1635, imperial forces again occupied the duchy. Like the Swedish troops before, they ravaged the countryside as well as the towns. Plunder, murder and arson occurred daily. The people in the Lębork and Bytów, Drahim, and Czaplinek were forced to adapt Roman Catholicism.

The last major raid of imperial troops occurred in 1643/44.

During the Thirty Years' War Pomerania, lost two thirds of its population due to military raids, plague, famine and criminal violence. Though the countryside was hit hardest, many towns had been burned down, too, especially in Farther Pomerania: Bärwalde (Barwice), Kolberg (Kołobrzeg), Naugard (Nowogard), Regenwalde (Resko), Rügenwalde (Darłowo), Miastko, and Stargard.

== Swedish and Brandenburgian Pomerania ==
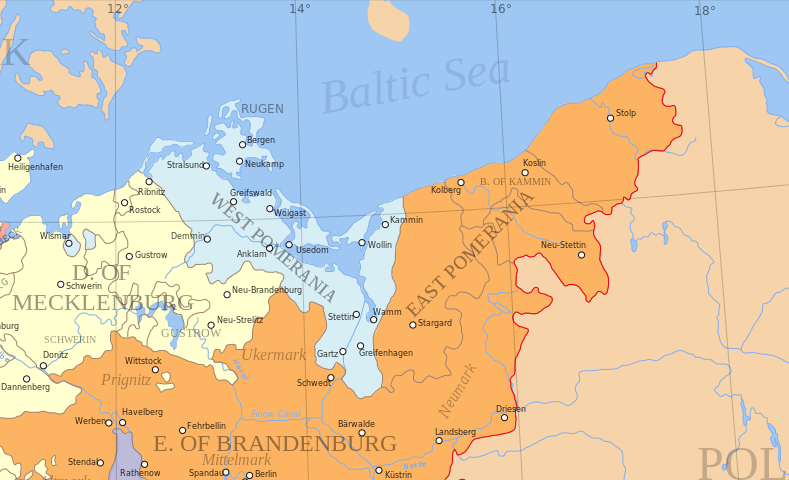
The former Duchy of Pomerania (center) partitioned between the Swedish Empire and Brandenburg after the Treaty of Stettin in 1653. Swedish Pomerania (West Pomerania) is indicated in blue, Brandenburgian Pomerania (East Pomerania) is shown in orange.

Following the death of Bogislaw XIV, Duke of Pomerania without issue in 1637, control was disputed between Sweden and Brandenburg–Prussia – which had previously held reversion to the Duchy. The Peace of Westphalia in 1648 enforced a partition into a Hither or Western and a Further or Eastern Pomerania. The exact frontier was decided in the Treaty of Stettin (1653). Sweden received Hither or Western Pomerania with Stettin (Swedish Pomerania). Farther Pomerania passed to Brandenburg-Prussia. In the negotiations between France, Brandenburg, and Sweden following the Northern War the Brandenburg diplomats Joachim Friedrich von Blumenthal and his son Christoph Caspar obtained the rights of succession for Brandenburg, though the argument with Sweden, especially over Hither Pomerania, continued to the end of the 17th century and beyond, until the Treaty of Stockholm in 1720. Stettin and Western Pomerania up to the Peene river (Old Western Pomerania or Altvorpommern) became part of Brandenberg-Prussia following the end of the Great Northern War in 1720.

Western Pomerania north of the Peene river (New Western Pomerania or Neuvorpommern) remained a dominion of the Swedish Crown from 1648 until 1815.

In the late 17th and early 18th centuries, French Huguenot communes were established in Stargard, Kołobrzeg, Pasewalk and Szczecin.

== Free farmers become serfs of the nobility ==
Throughout the High and Late Middle Ages, the rural population of Pomerania was dominated by free farmers working on their own, small, hereditary farms. Although the situation had worsened already before the war, the Thirty Years' War devastation marked a changing point, that was manifested by legal changes and the devastations of the wars yet to come.

Most free farmers who survived the war were stripped of their livestock and had repeatedly lost their crops. Thus, they had to raise their income from service at the estates of the nobles. In Swedish Pomerania, the legal environment was changed by new regulations (Bauernordnung) in 1647 and 1670. Farmers were now forced by their economic situation as well as the law to serve at the noble estates. The amount of service that had to be done varied, reaching a peak at 75% of a farmer's workforce. Farmers were tied by law to their home village and thus were not free to leave. This kind of serfdom is described by the German term Leibeigenschaft. At the same time, the noble landowners enjoyed the benefits of financial aid programs, and expanded their estates.

A small farmer, however, could free himself from the service by a monetary payment, if his economical standing allowed him to do so. This minority had a considerably better social standing and were personally free.

== Second Northern War ==
The Swedish Empire started her invasion of the Polish–Lithuanian Commonwealth from Swedish Pomerania and Livonia. Besides Warsaw and Kraków, the Pomerelian city of Toruń were taken. Brandenburg–Prussia allied with Sweden in the Treaty of Marienburg on June 25, 1656, which was renewed in the Treaty of Labiau on November 20, 1656.

In 1657, Polish forces led by general Czarniecki ravaged southern Swedish Pomerania, and destroyed and plundered Pasewalk, Gartz (Oder) and Penkun.

Brandenburg-Prussia concluded the Treaty of Wehlau on September 19, 1657, and the subsequent Treaty of Bydgoszcz. The Commonwealth therein assured Brandenburg's sovereignty in Prussia, made Lębork and Bytów a fief of Brandenburg under Polish sovereignty, and also pawned Drahim to Brandenburg.

In 1658, Brandenburg-Prussia left the coalition with Sweden and instead allied with the Commonwealth and the Holy Roman Empire.

In 1659, imperial forces led by general de Souches invaded Swedish Pomerania, took and burned Greifenhagen (Gryfino), took Wolin island and Damm, besieged Stettin (Szczecin) and Greifswald without success, but took Demmin on November 9. Counterattacks were mounted by general Müller von der Lühnen, who lifted the siege laid on Greifswald by the Brandenburgian prince elector, and major general Paul Wirtz, who from besieged Stettin managed to capture the Brandenburgian ammunition depot at Curau and took it to Stralsund. The Brandenburgians withdrew ravaging the countryside while retreating.

The Peace of Oliva on May 3, 1660, confirmed Brandenburg's rights in the Lębork and Bytów Land (under Polish sovereignty) as well as in Drahim and Sweden's rights in Swedish Pomerania.

== Scanian War ==
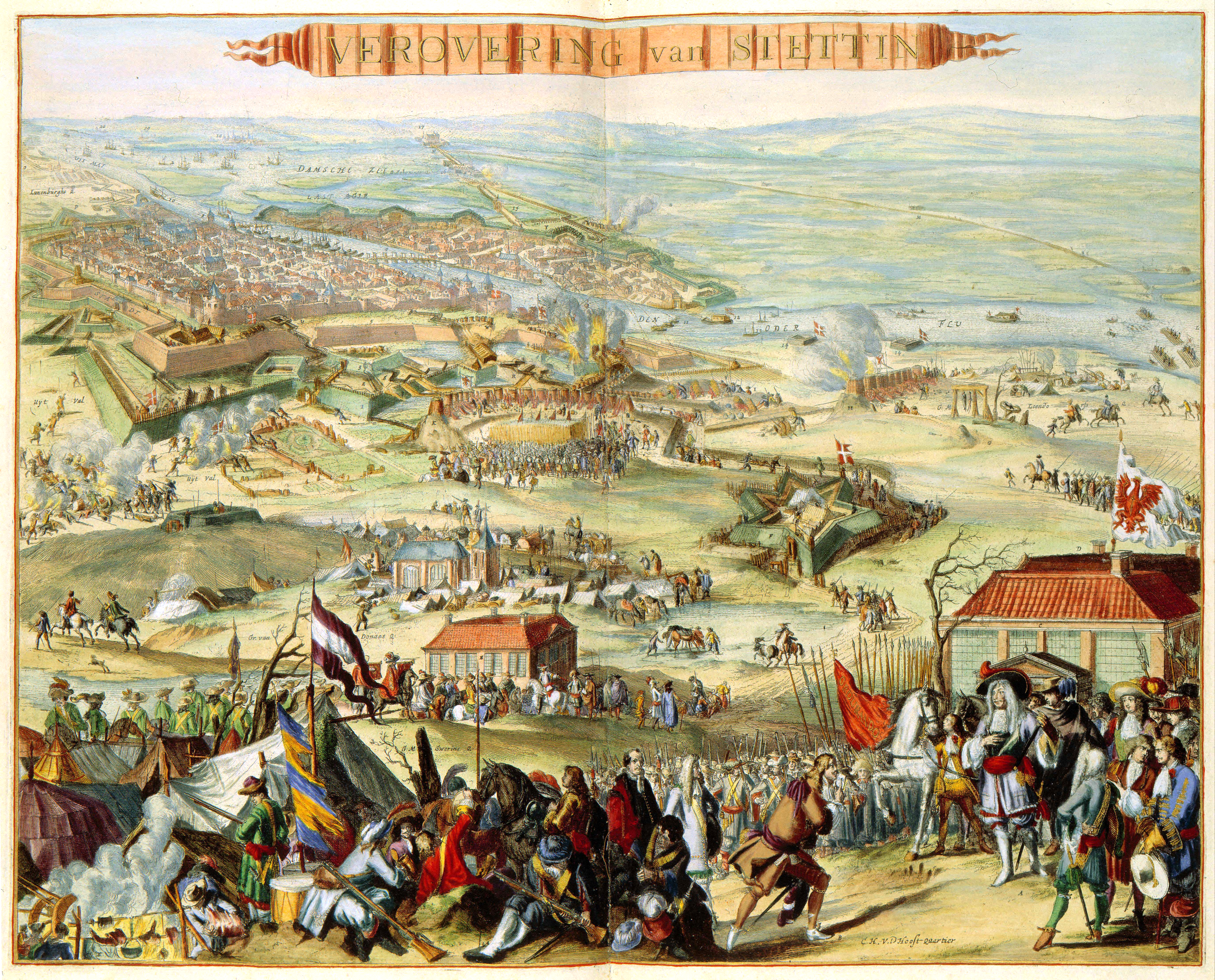
Siege of Stettin in 1677

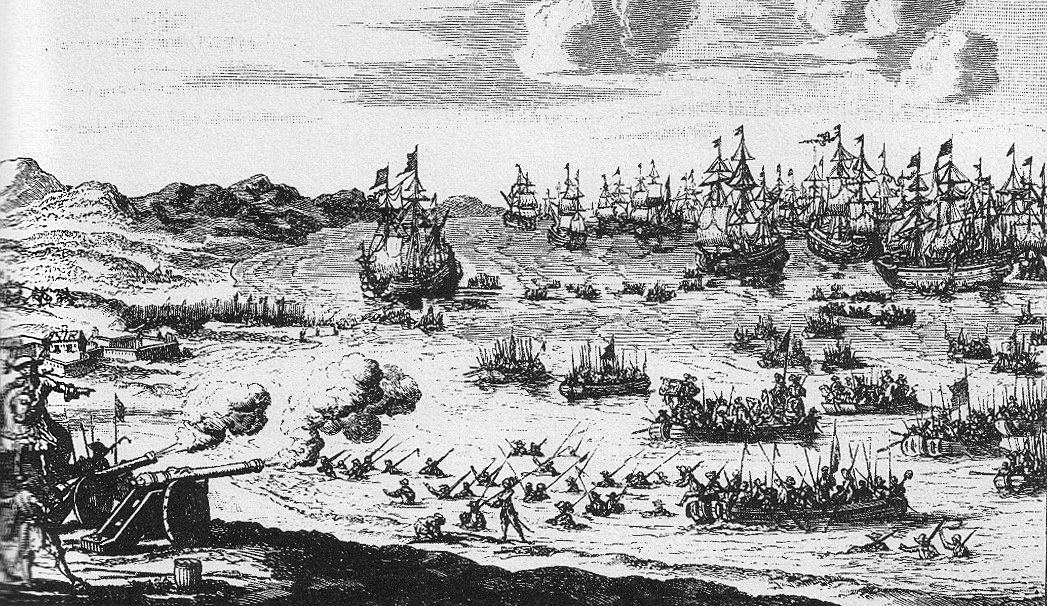
Invasion of Swedish Rügen by Brandenburg-Prussia, 1678

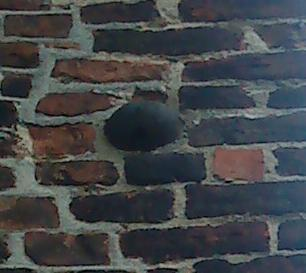
One of several cannonballs still stuck in the walls of St Mary's, Greifswald, from the Brandenburgian siege 1678

On December 19, 1674, a Swedish army led by Carl Gustav Wrangel advanced into the Brandenburgian Uckermark, taking Löcknitz, and into Brandenburgian Pomerania taking Stargard. In May, further advances into the Uckermark followed. Brandenburgian Farther Pomerania was occupied by Sweden and had to house Swedish garrisons. The war turned on June 18, when the Swedish army was defeated at Fehrbellin, and retreated to Swedish Demmin. In 1675, most of Swedish Pomerania was taken by the Brandenburgian, Austrians, and Danish forces. In December 1677, the elector of Brandenburg captured Stettin (Szczecin). Stralsund fell on October 11, 1678. Greifswald, Sweden's last possession on the continent, was lost on November 8.

Swedish Pomerania was occupied by Denmark and Brandenburg from 1675 to 1679, whereby Denmark claimed Rügen and Brandenburg the rest of Pomerania. Sweden reestablished control after the Peace of Saint-Germain-en-Laye on June 28, 1679. The strip of land on the east side of the Oder, except for Gollnow (Goleniów) and Altdamm (Dąbie), was given to Brandenburg. Gollnow and Altdamm were held by Brandenburg as a pawn in exchange for reparations, until these were paid in 1693.

Timeline of the Scanian War in Pomerania
| Date | Event |
|---|---|
| December 19, 1674 | Swedish invasion of Brandenburg. Löcknitz and Stargard sacked. |
| May 1675 | Swedish advance through the Uckermark |
| June 18, 1675 | Battle of Fehrbellin. Decisive Swedish defeat. |
| June 21, 1675 | Swedish army retreated to Demmin. |
| October 6, 1675 | Danish, Imperial and Brandenburgian forces group at the Swedish Pomeranian border: Danish forces near Damgarten, Imperial forces near Tribsees, Brandenburgian forces at Wildberg. |
| October 10, 1675 | Brandenburgian forces occupy Swedish Wolin and Usedom and reach the Peene river at Völschow |
| October 15, 1675 | Brandenburgian forces cross the Peene near Gützkow and advance northwards to sack Damgarten |
| October 19, 1675 | Brandenburgian forces occupy Tribsees |
| late October 1675 | unsuccessful Danish and Brandenburgian siege of Stralsund |
| November 1, 1675 | Brandenburgian forces sack Wolgast, seat of the Swedish Pomeranian government since 1665 |
| November 18, 1675 | Imperial and Brandenburgian forces retreat from Swedish Pomerania via the Recknitz river |
| January 19, 1676 | Combined Brandenburgian, Danish and Imperial forces advance towards Greifswald via Tribsees and Grimmen |
| January 31 and April 1676 | failed Brandenburgian and Danish campaigns towards Rügen |
| June 1676 | Brandenburgian and Danish forces start another campaign in Swedish Pomerania |
| July 31-August 28, 1676 | siege and sack of Anklam by Brandenburgian and Imperial forces |
| September 11-October 10, 1676 | siege and sack of Demmin |
| September 13, 1676 | sack of Löcknitz |
| July 7-December 26, 1677 | siege and sack of Stettin (Szczecin) by Brandenburgian forces |
| October 15, 1678 | sack of Stralsund by Brandenburgian forces |
| November 8, 1678 | sack of Greifswald by Brandenburgian forces. All Swedish Pomerania occupied by Denmark (Rügen) and Brandenburg. |

== Famine and the plague ==
Famine and the plague further reduced the Pomeranian population. In 1688, only 115,000 people lived in Pomerania proper. The most devastating plague epidemics lasted from 1709 to 1711, leaving up to one third dead. In Stettin (Szczecin), the population was reduced from 6,000 to 4,000 during this outbreak.

== Great Northern War ==
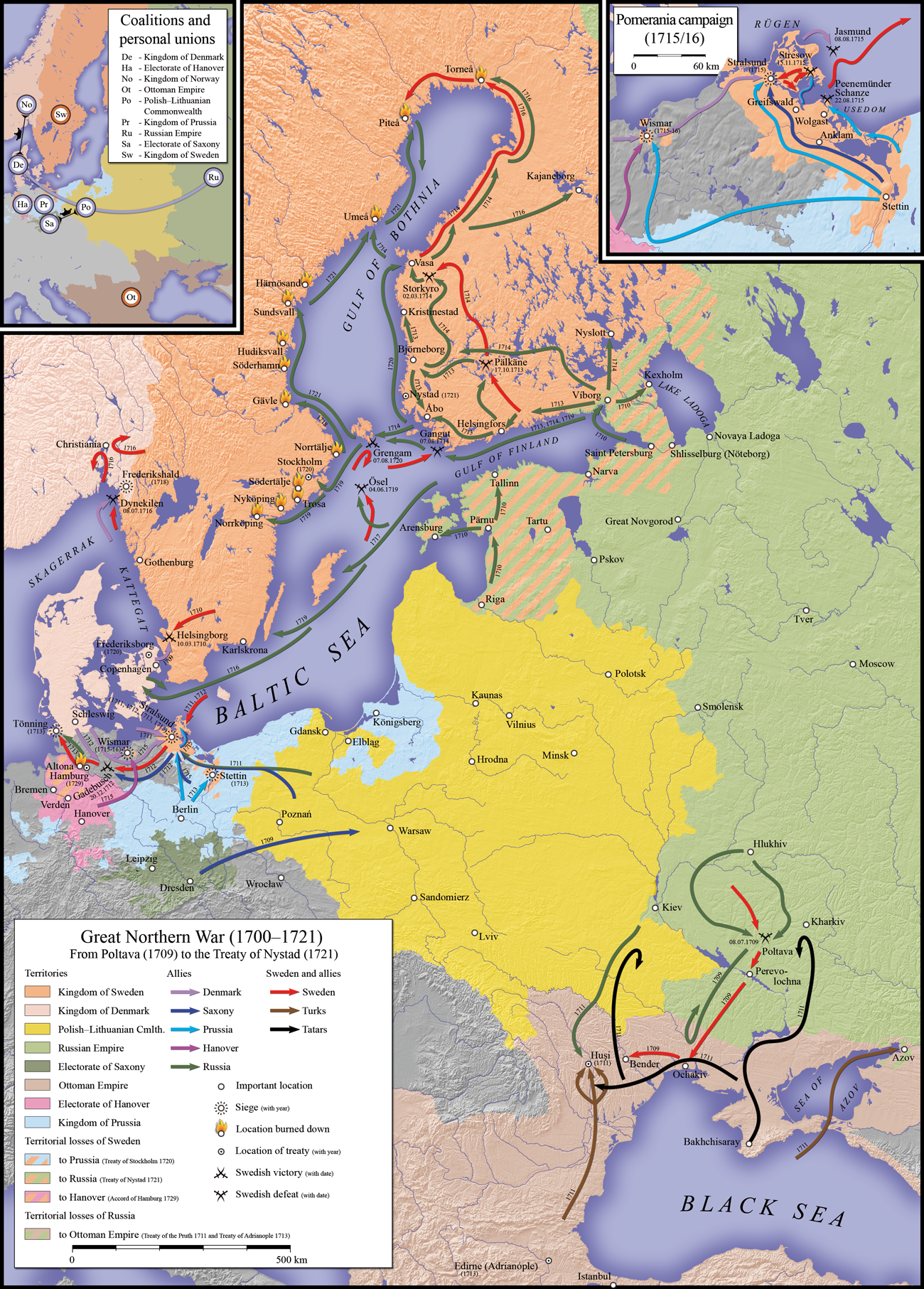
Late phase of the Great Northern War, zoom on the Pomeranian campaigns in the upper right map.

The first years of the Great Northern War did not affect Pomerania. In 1713, Holstein and Prussian diplomats held talks about Swedish Pomerania, aiming at Prussian occupation of the southern parts and in turn guaranteeing neutrality of this territory. An according treaty was signed on June 22, 1713, by Holstein, Prussia and the Swedish Empire. Only Stettin (Szczecin) commander Meyerfeldt refused to hand over the towns without receiving direct order of Swedish king Charles XII. Stettin was subsequently besieged by Russian and Saxon forces led by prince Aleksandr Danilovich Menshikov, and surrendered on September 29. According to the Treaty of Schwedt on October 6, Menshikov was paid his war costs by Prussia, and Stettin was occupied by Holstein and Brandenburg troops.

On June 12, 1714, king Friedrich Wilhelm I of Brandenburg–Prussia concluded a treaty with the Russian Empire confirming her gains in Swedish Ingermanland, Karelia and Estonia, and in turn received Russian confirmation of his gains in southern Swedish Pomerania.

On November 22, 1714, King Charles XII of Sweden returned from Turkey to lead the Swedish defense in Pomerania in person. In turn, Holstein's forces in Stettin were arrested as a Swedish ally by Prussia. In February 1715, Charles seized Wolgast in an advance to reestablish Swedish control in Western Pomerania.

On May 1, 1715, Prussia officially declared war on Sweden. In the same month, Hanover and Denmark joined the Russian-Prussian treaty of 1714. The allied forces subsequently occupied all of Pomerania except for Stralsund. In the Battle of Stralsund Charles XII of Sweden led the defense until December 22, 1715, when he evacuated to Lund.

After the Battle of Stralsund, Danish forces seized Rügen and Western Pomerania north of the Peene River (the former Danish Principality of Rugia that later would become known as New Western Pomerania or Neuvorpommern), while the Western Pomeranian areas south of the river (later termed Old Western Pomerania or Altvorpommern) were taken by Prussia, who had managed to get France to confirm her gains. Charles, who was not willing to cede any part of Swedish Pomerania, was shot on December 11, 1718. His successor, Ulrike Eleonora of Sweden, entered negotiations in 1719. By the Treaty of Frederiksborg, June 3, 1720, Denmark was obliged to hand back control over the occupied territory to Sweden, but in the Treaty of Stockholm, on January 21 in the same year, Prussia had been allowed to retain its conquest, including Stettin. By this, Sweden ceded the parts east of the Oder River that had been won in 1648 as well as Western Pomerania south of the Peene and the islands of Wolin and Usedom to Brandenburg–Prussia in turn for a 2 million Taler payment.

== Seven Years' War ==
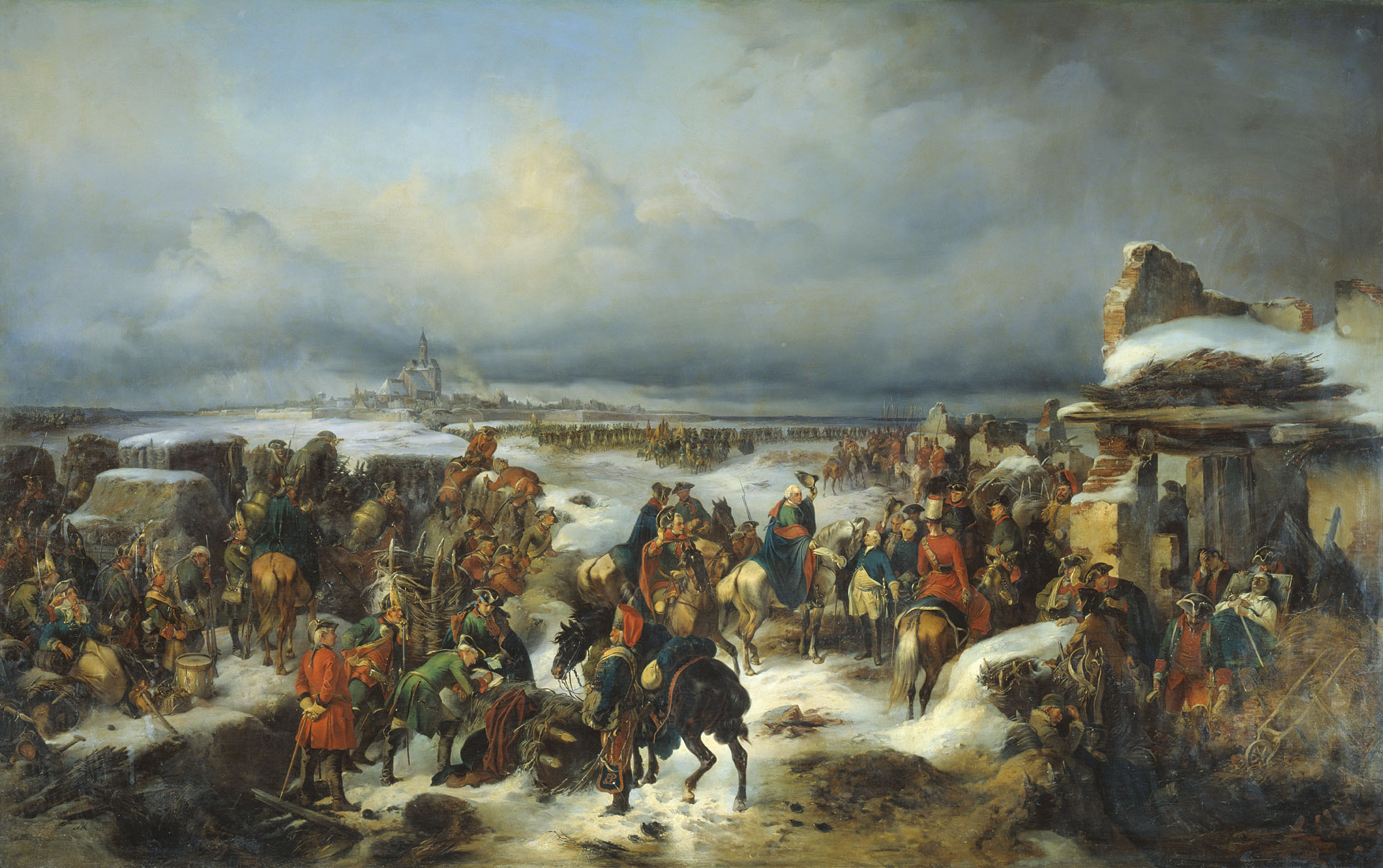
1761 Siege of Kolberg (Seven Years' War)

In September 1757, Swedish troops crossed the Peene river, which at this time marked the Swedish-Prussian border. The Swedes took Demmin, Usedom and Wolin, but were forced back by Prussian general Hans von Lehwaldt, who then turned to Swedish Stralsund. Yet, no significant fighting took place throughout the years 1757 to 1759, although the population had to endure garrison and pay war contributions.

After the Battle of Zorndorf in 1759, Russian troops made their way into Pomerania and laid a siege on Kolberg (Kołobrzeg). When Kolberg withstood, the Russian troops ravaged Farther Pomerania. Sweden and Russia invaded Brandenburgian Pomerania throughout the years 1760 and 1761. Kolberg was again made a target, withstood a second siege, but not the third one in 1761. In the winter of the same year, the Russian troops made Farther Pomerania their winter refuge. In 1762, Prussia made peace with Sweden and Russia.

Brandenburgian Pomerania was left ravaged and the civilian death toll amounted to 72,000.

== Rebuilding and inner colonisation of Prussian Pomerania ==
After the great losses of the previous wars, Prussia began rebuilding and resettling her war-torn province in 1718. Programs were made allowing financial aid to rebuild houses, e.g. people were paid 23% of a house's cost if they build it with fire-proof material, and vacant residential areas were let for free to those willing to erect buildings, also there were cases where those building a house were granted free citizenship, were freed of garrison duties, or were given the necessary timber for free. Also, public buildings were renewed or build new by the Prussian administration.

Swamps in the Randowbruch and Uckermark regions were drained and settled with colonists from the Netherlands since 1718. In 1734, a part of this region became therefore known as "Royal Holland". Dutch colonists were also settled in other parts of Pomerania. Also, Protestants from the Catholic Salzburg region arrived Prussia via the Pomeranian ports. While most went on to settle in other parts of Prussia, some settled in Pomerania.

To improve access to the port of Stettin (Szczecin), the Świna river was deepened and Swinemünde (Świnoujście) was founded on the river's mouth in 1748. A similar project in Stolp (Słupsk) failed due to monetary shortage.

Throughout the 1750s, the vast Oderbruch swamps were drained to acquire farmland.

Prussian king Frederick the Great appointed Franz Balthasar von Brenckenhoff to rebuild the war-torn Prussian share of Pomerania. Before the Seven Years' War, the Inner Colonisation of Farther Pomerania was started already by prince Moritz of Anhalt-Dessau. Brenckenhoff, after providing some humanitarian aid in 1763 (especially horses and wheat from the military and money for seed and life stock), introduced programs for financial aid, tax reduction, and low-rate credits and thus managed to have most of the destroyed farms rebuild in 1764.

In the following years, new farmland was made available by clearing woodlands and draining swamps (e.g. Thurbruch, Plönebruch, Schmolsiner Bruch) and lakes (e.g. Madüsee, Neustettiner See) as well as levee construction at some rivers (e.g. Ina, Leba).

To compensate for the wartime population losses, new colonists were attracted. In the 1740s, colonists were invited from the Palatinate, Württemberg, Mecklenburg, and Bohemia. Most came from the Palatinate, while the Bohemians soon returned to their homeland due to housing shortages. In 1750, recruitment of settlers started in Danzig, Elbląg, Warsaw, Augsburg, Frankfurt am Main, Nuremberg, Hamburg, and Brussels. Protestant craftsmen from Roman Catholic Poland settled in the towns. The colonists were freed of certain taxes and services such as military service. Between 1740 and 1784, 26,000 colonists arrived in Prussian Pomerania, and 159 new villages were founded. Most colonists originated in the Palatinate, Mecklenburg, and Poland.

In 1786, the population of Prussian Pomerania (Farther Pomerania and Western Pomerania south of the Peene river) reached 438,700.

== Partitions of Poland ==
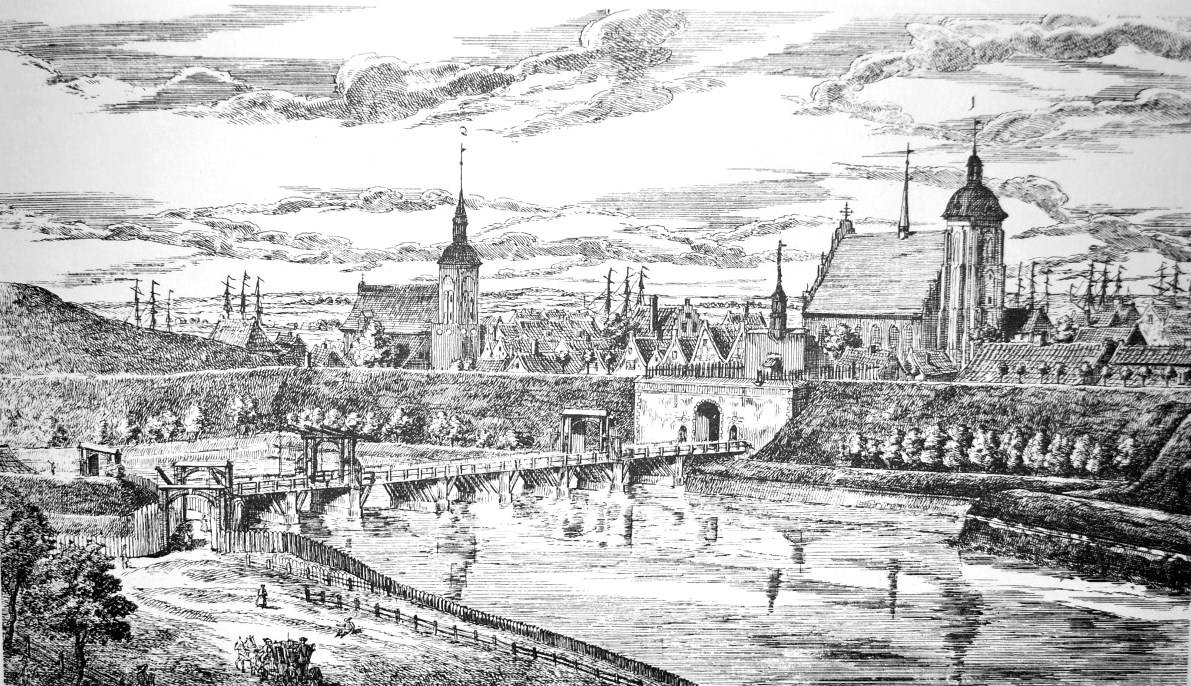
Gdańsk in the 1770s

In 1772 First Partition of Poland most of Royal Prussia was annexed by the Kingdom of Prussia, which created out of its conquered territories the province of West Prussia following year, with the exception of Warmia, which became part of the Province of East Prussia. The Polish administrative and legal code was replaced by the Prussian system, and education improved; 750 schools were built from 1772 to 1775. He also advised his successors to learn Polish, a policy followed by the Hohenzollern dynasty until Frederick III decided not to let William II learn the language.

Frederick despised Poles and called them "dirty" and "vile apes"- In the annexed lands the number of schools was reduced and some of them reoriented towards Germanization, while the peasant population was burdened with heavy taxes and twenty years of military service, while Prussian goods could move freely into acquired Polish territories, Polish wool industry (being the largest) was subject to prohibition of export to other Prussian areas; this put local industries at danger. He considered West Prussia as uncivilized as Colonial Canada and compared the Poles to the Iroquois. In a letter to his brother Henry, Frederick wrote about the province that "it is a very good and advantageous acquisition, both from a financial and a political point of view. In order to excite less jealousy I tell everyone that on my travels I have seen just sand, pine trees, heath land and Jews. Despite that there is a lot of work to be done; there is no order, and no planning and the towns are in a lamentable condition." Frederick invited German immigrants to redevelop the province, also hoping they would displace the Poles. Many German officials also regarded the Poles with contempt.

In the Second Partition of Poland in 1793, further annexations were made, with Prussia obtaining Gdańsk and Toruń, Germanised into Danzig and Thorn. Some of the areas of Greater Poland annexed in 1772 that formed the Netze District were added to West Prussia in 1793 as well.

== Bibliography ==
- Buchholz, Werner, ed. (2002). Pommern (in German). Siedler. ISBN 3-88680-780-0.
- du Moulin Eckart, Richard (1976). Geschichte der deutschen Universitäten (in German). Georg Olms Verlag. ISBN 3-487-06078-7.
- Heitz, Gerhard; Rischer, Henning (1995). Geschichte in Daten. Mecklenburg-Vorpommern (in German). Münster-Berlin: Koehler&Amelang. ISBN 3-7338-0195-4.
- Krause, Gerhard; Balz, Horst Robert (1997). Müller, Gerhard (ed.). Theologische Realenzyklopädie. De Gruyter. ISBN 3-11-015435-8.
- Nicklas, Thomas (2002). Macht oder Recht: frühneuzeitliche Politik im Obersächsischen Reichskreis (in German). Franz Steiner Verlag. ISBN 3-515-07939-4.
