= Province of Pomerania (1653–1815) =

Province of Brandenburg-Prussia

Pomerania Province Pommern
- Province of Brandenburg-Prussia; Province of the Kingdom of Prussia; State of the Holy Roman Empire until 1806
- 1653–1815
- Coat of arms

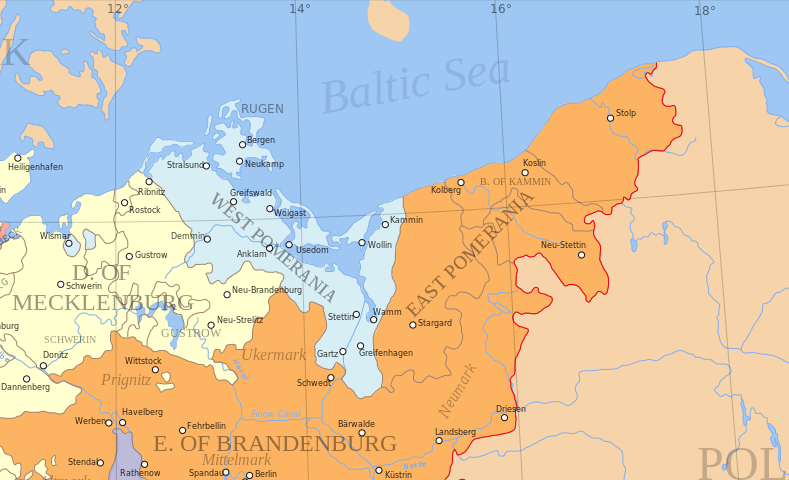
- Pomerania ("East Pomerania", orange), within Brandenburg-Prussia
- Capital: Kołobrzeg (1653–1668); Stargard (1668–1722); Stettin (Szczecin, 1722–1815)
- Area
  - Coordinates: 53°25′49″N 14°33′03″E
- Population
  - 1786: 438,700
- History
  - Established: 1653
  - Disestablished: 1815
Preceded by
Swedish Pomerania
Duchy of Pomerania
Bishopric of Cammin
Lauenburg–Bütow
Draheim
Succeeded by
Province of Pomerania

The Province of Pomerania was a province of Brandenburg-Prussia, the later Kingdom of Prussia. After the Thirty Years' War, the province consisted of Farther Pomerania. Subsequently, the Lauenburg and Bütow Land, Draheim, and Swedish Pomerania south of the Peene river were joined into the province. The province was succeeded by the Province of Pomerania set up in 1815.

The name Pomerania comes from Slavic po more meaning the land at a sea.

== Farther Pomerania ==
Farther Pomerania was made a province of Prussia (Brandenburg-Prussia) after the Peace of Westphalia ended the Thirty Years' War in 1648. During the war, the noble House of Pomerania (Griffins), ruling Pomerania since the 1120s as Dukes of Pomerania, became extinct in the male line with the death of Bogislaw XIV in 1637. Throughout the existence of the Griffin duchy, Brandenburg claimed overlordship and was asserted of Pomerania inheritance in numerous treaties. Yet, Sweden had been one of the most important players in the war and as such, it was awarded some of its territorial gains in Pomerania (Swedish Pomerania), after the war by the Peace of Westphalia, thwarting Brandenburg-Prussia's ambitions for inheritance of the whole former Duchy of Pomerania.

== Gain of Lauenburg and Bütow Land and Draheim ==
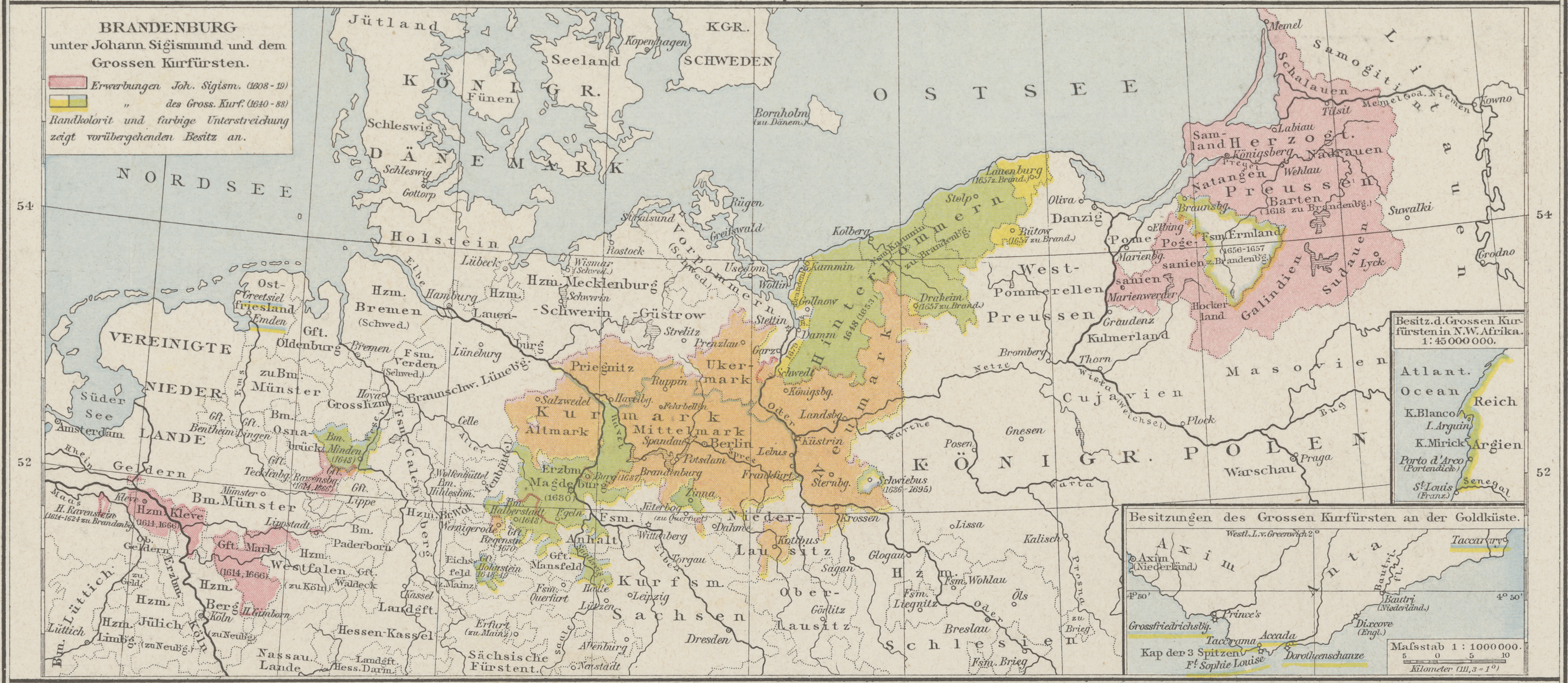
Brandenburg-Prussia (1618–1680) with Farther Pomerania (Hinterpommern, light green), Draheim (yellow), Lauenburg-Bütow (yellow) and the strip along the Oder (yellow). Year of incorporation indicated.

During the Second Northern War (1654–1660), Brandenburg-Prussia and the Polish–Lithuanian Commonwealth concluded the Treaty of Wehlau on 19 September 1657, and the subsequent Treaty of Bromberg. The Commonwealth therein gave Brandeburg-Prussia the Lauenburg and Bütow Land as a fief, and also pawned Draheim to Brandenburg.

The Peace of Oliva on 3 May 1660, confirmed Brandenburg's rights in the Lauenburg and Bütow Land as well as in Draheim.

== Gain of lower Oder's right bank ==
Swedish Pomerania was occupied by Denmark and Brandenburg in the Brandenburg-Swedish theater of the Scanian War from 1675 to 1679, whereby Denmark claimed Rügen and Brandenburg the rest of Pomerania. Sweden reestablished control after the Peace of Saint-Germain-en-Laye on 28 June 1679.

This tempted Frederick William, Elector of Brandenburg, to utter "Exoriare aliquis nostris ex ossibus ultor! [Let someone arise from my bones as an avenger]".

The strip of land on the east side of the Oder, except for Gollnow and Altdamm, was given to Brandenburg. Gollnow and Altdamm were held by Brandenburg as a pawn in exchange for reparations, until these were paid in 1693.

== Gain of southern Swedish Pomerania ==
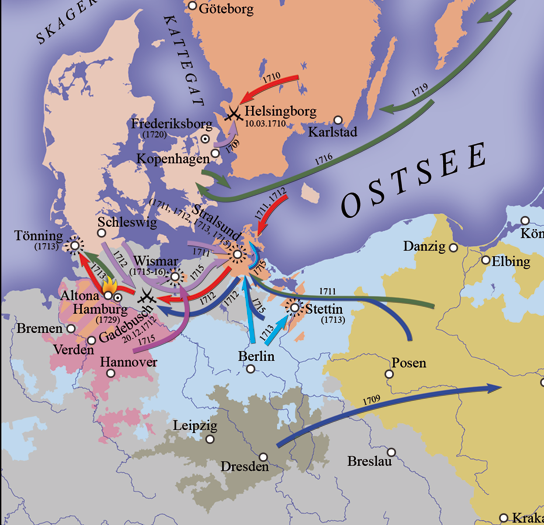
Great Northern War in Pomerania. Swedish Pomerania in brown, Brandenburg-Prussian Pomerania in blue, Siege of Stralsund (1711–1715) and gains of 1720 indicated.

During the Great Northern War, Stettin was sieged by Russian and Saxon forces led by prince Menschikov, and surrendered on 29 September. According to the Treaty of Schwedt on 6 October, Menschikov was paid his war costs by Prussia, and Stettin was occupied by Holstein and Brandenburg troops.

On 12 June 1714, king Friedrich Wilhelm I of Brandenburg-Prussia concluded a treaty with the Russian Empire confirming her gains in Swedish Ingermanland, Karelia and Estonia, and in turn received Russian confirmation of his gains in southern Swedish Pomerania.

On 22 November 1714, King Charles XII of Sweden returned from Turkey to lead the Swedish defense in Pomerania in person. In turn, Holstein's forces in Stettin were arrested as a Swedish ally by Prussia. In February 1715, Charles seized Wolgast in an advance to reestablish Swedish control in Western Pomerania.

On 1 May 1715, Prussia officially declared war on Sweden. In the same month, Hanover and Denmark joined the Russian-Prussian treaty of 1714. The allied forces subsequently occupied all of Pomerania except for Stralsund. In the Battle of Stralsund Charles XII of Sweden led the defense until 22 December 1715, when he evacuated to Lund.

In the Treaty of Stockholm, concluded on 21 January 1720, Prussia was allowed to retain its conquest, including Stettin. By this, Sweden ceded the parts east of the Oder River that had been won in 1648 as well as Western Pomerania south of the Peene river (Old Western Pomerania or Altvorpommern) and the islands of Wollin and Usedom to Brandenburg-Prussia in turn for a 2 million Taler payment.

The capital was then moved to Stettin.

== Seven Years' War ==
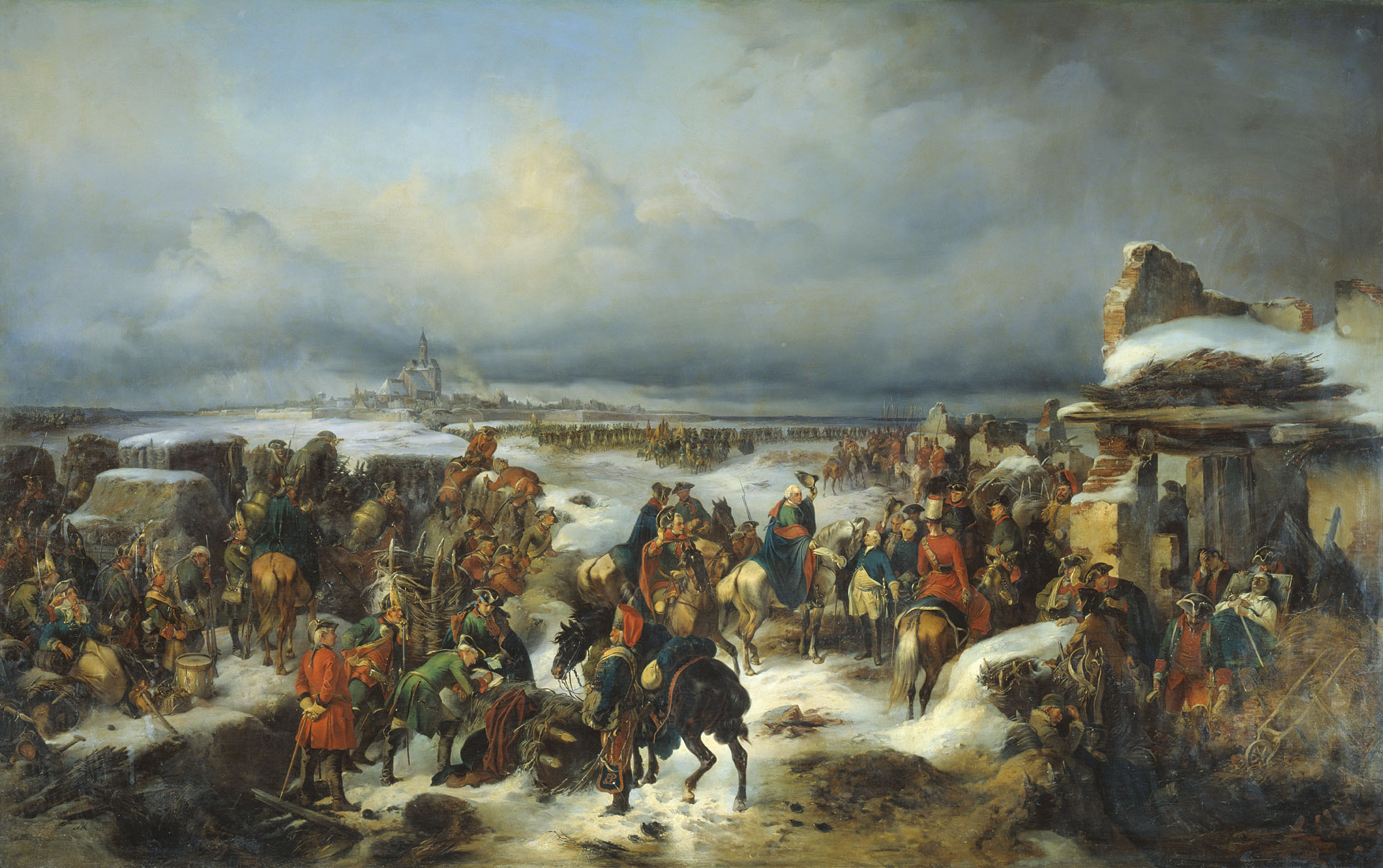
Siege of Kolberg (1761)

After the Battle of Zorndorf in 1759 (Seven Years' War), Russian troops made their way into Pomerania and laid a siege on Kolberg. When Kolberg withstood, the Russian troops ravaged Farther Pomerania. Sweden and Russia invaded Brandenburgian Pomerania throughout the years 1760 and 1761. Kolberg was again made a target, withstood a second siege, but not the third one in 1761. In the winter of the same year, the Russian troops made Farther Pomerania their winter refuge. In 1762, Prussia made peace with Sweden and Russia.

The province of Pomerania was left ravaged and the civilian death toll amounted to 72,000. About 20 percent of the population in the province of Pomerania died, atrocities were committed and a food shortage followed.

== Administration ==
The Swedish forces left Kolberg and were replaced by Brandenburgian troops on 6 June 1653. Three days later, the prince elector called the nobility to assemble at a Landtag in Stargard, that constituted on 19 July 1654, to decide on the further administrative system of the province.

=== Regimentsverfassung ("regime constitution") of 1654 ===
The Landtag decrees along with a constitution ("Regimentsverfassung") were issued on 11 July 1654.

Kolberg was made the new capital. Troops were to be permanently garrisoned in the town, this was to be paid for by the province. The province was to be governed by a "Regierung" (government, led by a president and a chancellor, four other members, general administration, in charge of the police, border patrol, enforcement of ducal rights), a "Kammer" (chamber, also "Amtskammer"), a "Rentei", for administration of the domains), a "Hofgericht" (court) and a "Konsistorium" (ecclesiastical administration). The first president was Ewald von Kleist. Because the president was also occupied with diplomatic missions and representation of the province in Berlin, the chancellor was instead supervising the province's administration.

The province was divided into seven knightly districts, also the territories of eight local noble houses (Flemming, Borcke, Wedel, Dewitz, Osten-Blücher, Manteuffel and Glasenapp, so-called "schloßgesessene Familien", i.e. palace-owning families), and the County of Naugard. Furthermore, there were the ducal domains ("Amt") Kolbatz, Friedrichswalde, Marienfließ, Treptow, Stolp and Rügenwalde, and the towns of Pyritz, Stargard, Treptow an der Rega, Greifenberg, Belgard, Neustettin, Schlawe, Stolp, Rügenwalde, Kolberg and Köslin. The secularized territory of the Kammin diocese ("Stift Cammin") had a separate status.

The population was represented in the "Landständische Vertretung" by 25 "Landrat" officials. The knightly districts assigned nine, the noble families six, the towns five and Stift Cammin also five. The prince-elector had to approve the assignments.

=== Military administration ===
Brandenburg-Prussia set up a combined military institution, the war commissionary for her Pomeranian province and Neumark. It was led by Wedego von Bonin as the kriegskommissar. Initially only active during wartime, it became a permanent institution in 1660. The Kriegskommissariat was subject only to the prince-elector (later king) and not to the provincial government. It was represented in the urban communities by "Steuerkommissar" and in the rural districts by "Kriegskommissar" (later "Kreisdirektor") officials. These commissioners collected contributions (war tax) and supervised garrison. Tus, the Kriegskommisariat became a central institution in the province's financial and economical administration.

=== Administrative reform of 1714 ===
In 1714, the former position of "Landrat" was abolished, and replaced with that of "Prussian Landrat". The office was assigned to the former Kreisdirektor. Already before the reform, the positions of Kreisdirektor (initially Kriegskommissar) and Landrat of a district had often been held by the same man.

=== Administrative reform of 1722 ===
Based on an order of Prussian king Frederick William I, Amtskammer and Kriegskommissariat were fused into the "Kriegs- und Domänenkammer" (war and domain chamber), in 1722. This new chamber moved from Stargard, which had been capital since 1668, to Stettin, which had been acquired by Prussia and merged into the Pomeranian province in 1720. The chamber was responsible for all administrative fields of the province except for justice (that was within the responsibility of the government and the court) and ecclesial administration (handled by the Konsistorium). A second chamber (though under superiority of the Stettin chamber) was set up in 1764 in Köslin for the eastern districts.

=== Administrative and military reform of 1733 ===
On 15 September 1733, Prussian king Frederick William I ordered another administrative reform. The most important change was the application of the "Kantonsreglement" order. This order split the province into small military districts ("Kanton") based on the civilian ones. All peasants of a canton were enrolled by the Prussian army, and assigned to the Prussian infantry units Infanterieregiment 7, 8, 17, 22 or 30, or the cavalry units Dragonerregiment 1, 2 or 5. The enrollment did not depend on actual warfare, but was permanent. Also, the rural nobility was enlisted into the army as potential officers. Those chosen (by the king himself) for a military career were trained in Berlin, and received not only military, but a broad education.

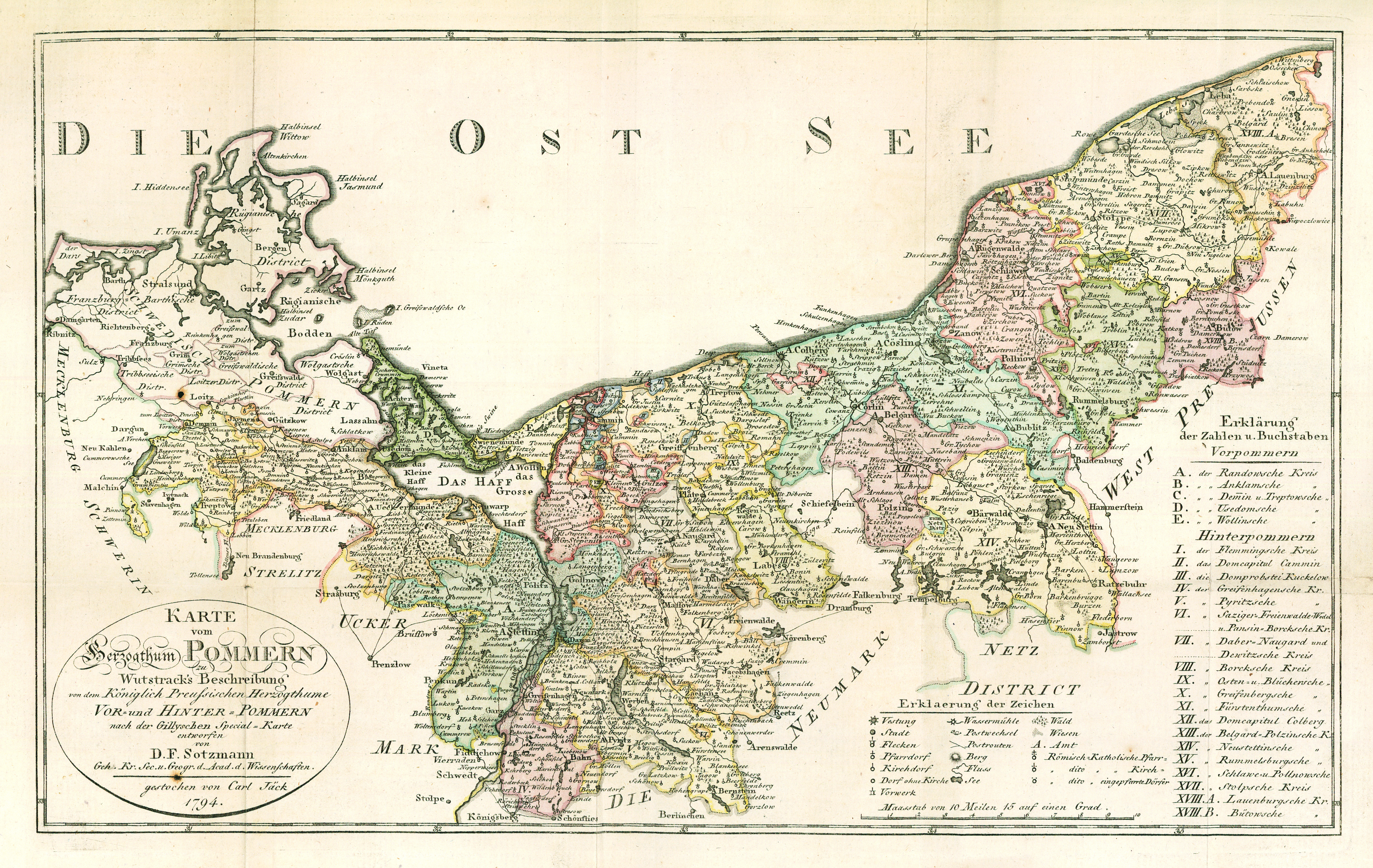
Duchy of Hither and Farther Pomerania around the year of 1794.

== Rebuilding and Inner Colonisation of Prussian Pomerania ==
After the great losses of the previous wars, Prussia began rebuilding and resettling her war-torn province in 1718. Programs were devised for financial aid to rebuild houses, e.g. people were paid 23% of a house's cost if they built it with fire-proof material, and vacant residential areas were granted rent free to those willing to erect buildings. There were also cases where those building a house were granted free citizenship, were exonerated from garrison duties, or were given the necessary timber for free. Also, public buildings were renewed or built new by the Prussian administration.

Swamps in the Randowbruch and Uckermark regions were drained and settled with colonists from the Low Countries from 1718. In 1734 part of this region became therefore known as "Royal Holland". Dutch colonists were also settled in other parts of Pomerania. Also, Protestants from the otherwise Catholic Salzburg region arrived Prussia via the Pomeranian ports. While most went on to settle in other parts of Prussia, some settled in Pomerania.

To improve access to the port of Stettin, the Swine river was deepened and Swinemünde was founded on the river's mouth in 1748. A similar project in Stolp failed due to financial shortfalls.

Throughout the 1750s, the vast Oderbruch swamps were drained to provide farmland.

King Frederick the Great appointed Franz Balthasar von Brenckenhoff to rebuild the war-torn Prussian portion of Pomerania. Even before the Seven Years' War, the Inner Colonisation of Farther Pomerania had been begun by prince Moritz of Anhalt-Dessau. Brenckenhoff, after providing some humanitarian aid in 1763 (especially horses and wheat from the military and money for seed and life stock), introduced programs for financial aid, tax reduction, and low-rate credits and thus managed to have most of the farms that had been destroyed rebuild in 1764.

In the years following, new farmland was made available by clearance of woodlands and draining of swamps (e.g. Thurbruch, Plönebruch, Schmolsiner Bruch) and lakes (e.g. Madüsee, Neustettiner See) as well as levee construction at some rivers (e.g. Ihna, Łeba).

To compensate for the wartime population losses, new colonists were attracted. In the 1740s, colonists were invited from the Palatinate, Württemberg, Mecklenburg and Bohemia. Most came from the Palatinate, while the Bohemians soon returned to their homeland as a result of housing shortages. In 1750, recruitment of settlers started in Danzig, Elbing, Warsaw, Augsburg, Frankfurt am Main, Nuremberg, Hamburg and Brussels. Protestant craftsmen from Roman Catholic Poland settled in the towns. The colonists were freed of certain taxes and services such as military service. Between 1740 and 1784, 26,000 colonists arrived in Prussian Pomerania, and 159 new villages were founded. Most colonists originated in the Palatinate, Mecklenburg and Poland.

In 1786, the population of Prussian Pomerania (Farther Pomerania and Western Pomerania south of the Peene river) reached 438,700.

== Napoleonic Wars ==
After Prussia lost the Battle of Jena-Auerstedt in late 1806, French troops marched north into the Pomeranian province. Fortified Stettin surrendered without battle, and the province became occupied by the French forces. Only fortified Kolberg resisted, and the French laid siege in March 1807. Ferdinand von Schill was among the defendants. The siege was not successful and was lifted only when Prussia surrendered to Napoleon Bonaparte in the Peace of Tilsit on 2 July.

The terms of surrender included high war contributions (25,000,000 Taler from the Province of Pomerania alone). The agreed on withdrawal of the French troops was delayed repeatedly. In November 1808, the French troops left the province except for Stettin, which forced the provincial government to move to Stargard in 1809. The Kriegs- und Domänenkammer was renamed Royal-Prussian government ("Königlich Preußische Regierung"), while the former government ("Regierung") was renamed Supreme State Court ("Oberlandesgericht").

The reforms of vom Stein (1807) and Karl August von Hardenberg (1811) abolished serfdom.

In 1812, French troops invaded Swedish Pomerania, and also occupied Prussian Pomerania again. The Prussian troops took quarter in Kolberg. After Ludwig Yorck von Wartenburg, who commanded a Prussian corps with a significant Pomeranian share, had left the coalition with France in the Convention of Tauroggen of 30 December 1812, the Prussian military called the Pomeranians to arms in February 1813. Also in February, Russian troops reached Farther Pomerania. In March, all French forces left Pomerania, except for Stettin, which was held by the French until 5 December 1813. After the war, Prussia after diplomatic efforts of Hardenberg in the Congress of Vienna gained Swedish Pomerania by paying 2,6 million Taler to Denmark and granting her the Duchy of Lauenburg, and paying an additional 3,5 million Taler to Sweden on 7 June 1815. On 23 October, Swedish Pomerania was merged into the Prussian province, both now constituting the Province of Pomerania.
