= Andreas Müller =

Andreas Müller may refer to:

- Andreas Müller (footballer, born 1962), German footballer
- Andreas Müller (footballer, born 2000), German footballer
- Andreas Müller (painter) (1811–1890), German historical painter
- Andreas Müller (athlete) (born 1971), Paralympic athlete from Germany
- Andreas Müller (cyclist) (born 1979), Austrian track cyclist
- Andreas Müller (politician), interim mayor of Leipzig, Germany

== See also ==
- Andreas Möller (born 1967), German footballer
- Joachim Daniel Andreas Müller (1812–1857), Swedish gardener and writer
- Walter Andreas Müller (born 1945), Swiss actor
