= Joachim Daniel Andreas Müller =

Swedish writer

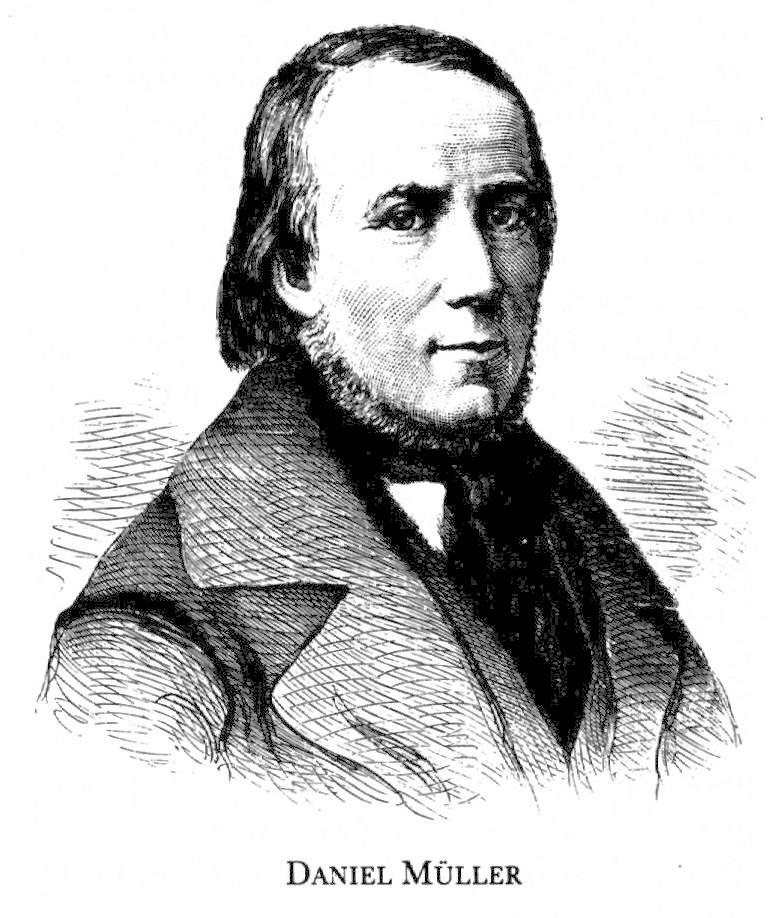
- ca. 1850
- Born: Joachim Daniel Andreas Moller; 7 September 1812; Stralsund, Swedish Pomerania
- Died: 18 September 1857 (aged 45); Uppsala, Sweden
- Other names: Daniel Müller; Daniel Andreas Joachim Müller
- Occupations: Pioneering gardener and horticulturalist writer
- Spouse: Clarissa Louise Nernst (1808–1878)

Joachim Daniel Andreas Müller (7 September 1812 – 18 September 1857) was a Swedish gardener and writer. Some sources identify him simply as Daniel Müller while others resequence his names, most commonly to Daniel Andreas Joachim Müller.

== Life ==
Joachim Daniel Andreas Moller was born in Stralsund, at that time still in Swedish Pomerania. His grandfather had come, originally as a soldier, from Scania, the southern tip of mainland Sweden. The Stralsund region had become Swedish during the course of the Thirty Years' War, following a military siege in 1628; but in 1815, under terms mandated at the Congress of Vienna, the whole of Pommerania was returned to Prussia: Daniel's father, a successful commercial/market gardener, changed the family name from "Moller" to "Müller". Daniel Müller left the local Gymnasium (secondary school) when he was 17, and embarked on an apprenticeship in his father's business.

Between 1836 and 1838, he attended lectures by Christian Friedrich Hornschuch at nearby Greifswald University. Here he became friendly with the horticulturalist Ferdinand Jühlke. In the University Botanical Gardens he undertook a second apprenticeship after which Hornschuch transferred responsibility for organizing the gardening work to him. In 1839 he was able to switch to Uppsala where on the recommendation of Hornschuch he took over responsibility for the Botanical Gardens, thereby becoming an indirect successor of the celebrated botanist Linnaeus. Müller was peculiarly suitable for the Uppsala position not merely on account of his expertise as a gardener, but also because his upbringing had left him fluent in both German and Swedish. In the years that followed he was able to act as a link between horticultural research in the two language zones, publishing numerous scientific papers in both languages.

Before leaving for Uppsala, Daniel Müller had married Clarissa Louise Nernst (1808–1878), the daughter of Joh Christopher Nernst, a teacher from Rügen. The two of them led a fulfilled family life, taking on responsibility for three foster children. However, there were personnel problems at the Uppsala Botanical Gardens, where he felt he was underpaid, and after a couple of years Müller handed in his notice, and, in 1841, moved to Stockholm, taking a position with the recently established Swedish Horticultural Society (Svenska trädgårdsföreningen). Here he taught at the new Gardening Academy, and worked at the Society's gardens. He was given responsibility for plant research and exhibitions. He also planned the greenhouses. It was a measure of his success that from 1844 the Horticultural Society received state support. At a time of rapid change in the world of horticulture, Müller also continued his own education with study trips to Germany and Denmark. In 1846, funded by the king, he visited Saint Petersburg, at that time a world-class center of advances in horticulture.

On the recommendation of Ferdinand Jühlke, in 1848 he became an honorary member of the "Horticultural Development Association for New Western Pomerania and Rügen." In the same year he was involved in the establishment of the "Stockholm Gardens Association", becoming its first chairman. It was also in 1848 that his three volume work "Trädgårdsskötsel" ("The art of gardening") appeared. This work reappeared in successive editions even after his own death, and was the most influential Swedish gardening book of the period.

At the same time, his work at the Swedish Horticultural Association was becoming increasingly burdensome This problem was exacerbated, according to one source, by a disinclination to delegate hands-on work to colleagues. Towards the end of the 1840s he resigned from his position with the Association.

In 1849, he opened the "Charlottenburgs handelsträdgård", Sweden's first commercial nursery, on the island of Reimersholme in central Stockholm. In 1851, Elias Magnus Fries at last took over the teaching professorship for Botany at Uppsala University, appointed the same year as director in charge of the Botanical Gardens. Fries gained the promotion because of the death of the previous incumbent, Göran Wahlenberg, who seems to have been involved in the personnel problems that had induced Müller to relocate to Stockholm in 1841. With Wahlenberg gone, Müller now returned to Uppsala and resumed his earlier responsibilities at the Uppsala Botanical Gardens. He increased the number of distinct plant types from 8,000 to 9,000 or 10,000, (sources differ), chiefly through exchanges with other Botanical Gardens. He also took up a request from the "Economic Society", and arranged for a 2-hectare (4.9-acre) site to the south of the Botanical Gardens to be planted with fruiting and ornamental trees. For this he was awarded the "Gold Medal of the Economic Society". The tree garden was uses as a training facility for trainee teachers. In 1856 Müller also drew up the plans for a Botanical Gardens in Visby.

== Daniel Müller, the poet: ==
"Ihr tausend kleine, liebliche Gestalten,
Die täglich sich zu neuem Reiz’ entfalten,
Wie lieb ich euch, ihr zarten, heitern Wesen!
Wie mag ich gern in euren Zügen lesen!
Ein schönes Loos ward euch von Gott beschieden:
In eurem stillen Reiche waltet Frieden;
Ihr habet nichts mit Politik zu schaffen,
Habt nicht Despoten oder falsche Pfaffen.
Ihr trinket unverfälscht des Lichtes Strahlen,
Ihr dürft sie wieder in die Blüthen malen."

"Your thousand small darling shapes,
Which each day uncover new delights,
How I love you, your harsh tender nature!
How I long to read your aspects!
God granted you a wonderful destiny:
In your tranquil Kingdom peace prevails;
You have no involvement in politics,
You do not suffer from despots and false prophets.
You imbibe unadulterated sunlight,
Which you allow to paint your flowers."

In 1854 Müller undertook a sea voyage in order to cure a chest illness. He died in 1857, as did most of his colleagues at Uppsala, during a cholera epidemic. His grave stone, financed by friends and former pupils, can still (2015) be seen in the city's old cemetery. In 1874 friends founded the "Daniel Müller stipendiefond", a travel bursary fund administered by the Stockholm Gardeners' Society.

== The writer ==
Müller began to write poetry and to exchange ideas with others, similarly inclined, when he was a still a child. He also saw his horticultural activities as an opportunity to make the world a better place. In 1844 he published, together with his wife Clarissa Louise Nernst, a volume of poetry intended for friends and acquaintances. In 1855, following the death of her mother, the poet Thekla Knös (1815–1888) moved in with the Müllers. Together with the writer Fredrika Bremer, the Müller household took to attending the lectures presented by Elias Fries, and with the women Daniel Müller now published a volume of poetry, "Fyrväplingen – vers och prosa" ("Four-leaf clover – verse and prose"). A second volume, "Konvaljerna – en sago-krans" ("Lilly of the valley – a fairy ring"), followed.

Müller's own contributions focused on just a few themes. They tell of his love for his wife and the vitality of the plant world, along with the more melancholy themes of a lost homeland, death and eternity. Müller lived before Evolution had been written up and become mainstream among scientists, and his own thoughts concentrate on the "moral" causes and outcomes in a natural world able to operate without human involvement. In nature and the world of plants he saw an unfolding of God's plan, in which man should participate as a "cultivator".

From this perspective he also engaged in the debate of the time about introducing horticulture as a subject worthy of academic study. For him, horticulture offered the possibility of introducing "moral" context to rural populations, and he broadened this into a more general belief that becoming involved in cultivating "beautiful plants" even offered a way to curb alcoholism cultivator".
