= Old Western Pomerania =

Part of Western Pomerania ceded to Prussia in 1720

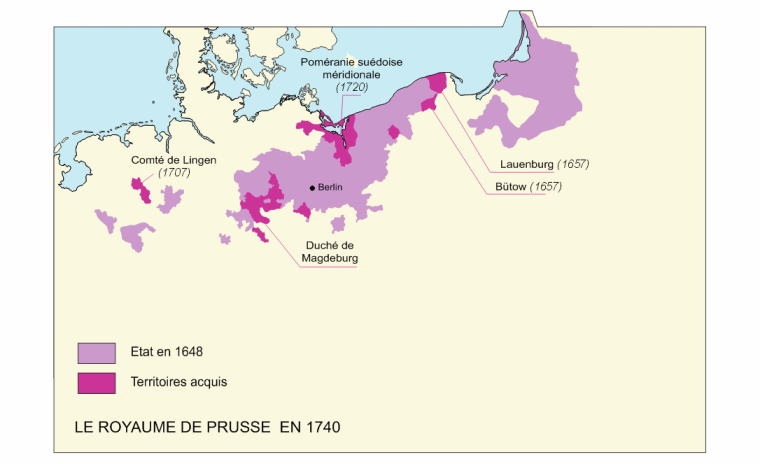
Old Hither Pomerania (purple, centre of the map at the coast), the former south of Swedish Pomerania

Old Western Pomerania or Old Hither Pomerania (German: Altvorpommern or Alt-Vorpommern, Polish: Stare Pomorze Przednie) was the part of Western Pomerania that went to Prussia under the terms of the Treaty of Stockholm in 1720, now divided between Poland and Germany.

== History ==
The name Old Western Pomerania was first used when that area of Swedish Pomerania first went to Prussia. The territory that had been remained with Sweden after the Treaty of Stockholm, and was later transferred to Prussia under the Congress of Vienna in 1815, was named New Western Pomerania or New Hither Pomerania.

Whilst New Hither Pomerania enjoyed a special legal status within the Prussian state after 1815, this was not the case for Old Western Pomerania or Farther Pomerania (Hinterpommern). Nevertheless, the Pomeranian Provincial Parliament, also formed in 1823, was elected separately by New Western Pomerania, Old Western Pomerania and Farther Pomerania. Whilst New Western Pomerania was given its own Regional Parliament (for New Western Pomerania and Rügen) in 1823, a joint Regional Parliament for Old Hither Pomerania and Farther Pomerania was formed. Both regional parliaments continued to exist until 1881.

With the gradual loss of New Hither Pomerania's special status, the names New and Old Western Pomerania also fell out of use.

== See also ==
- History of Pomerania

== Literature ==
- Johannes Hinz: Pommern-Lexikon. Geographie, Geschichte, Kultur. Lizenzausgabe. Bechtermünz Verlag, Augsburg, 1996, ISBN 3-86047-185-6, p. 31.
