= New Western Pomerania =

Prussian territory

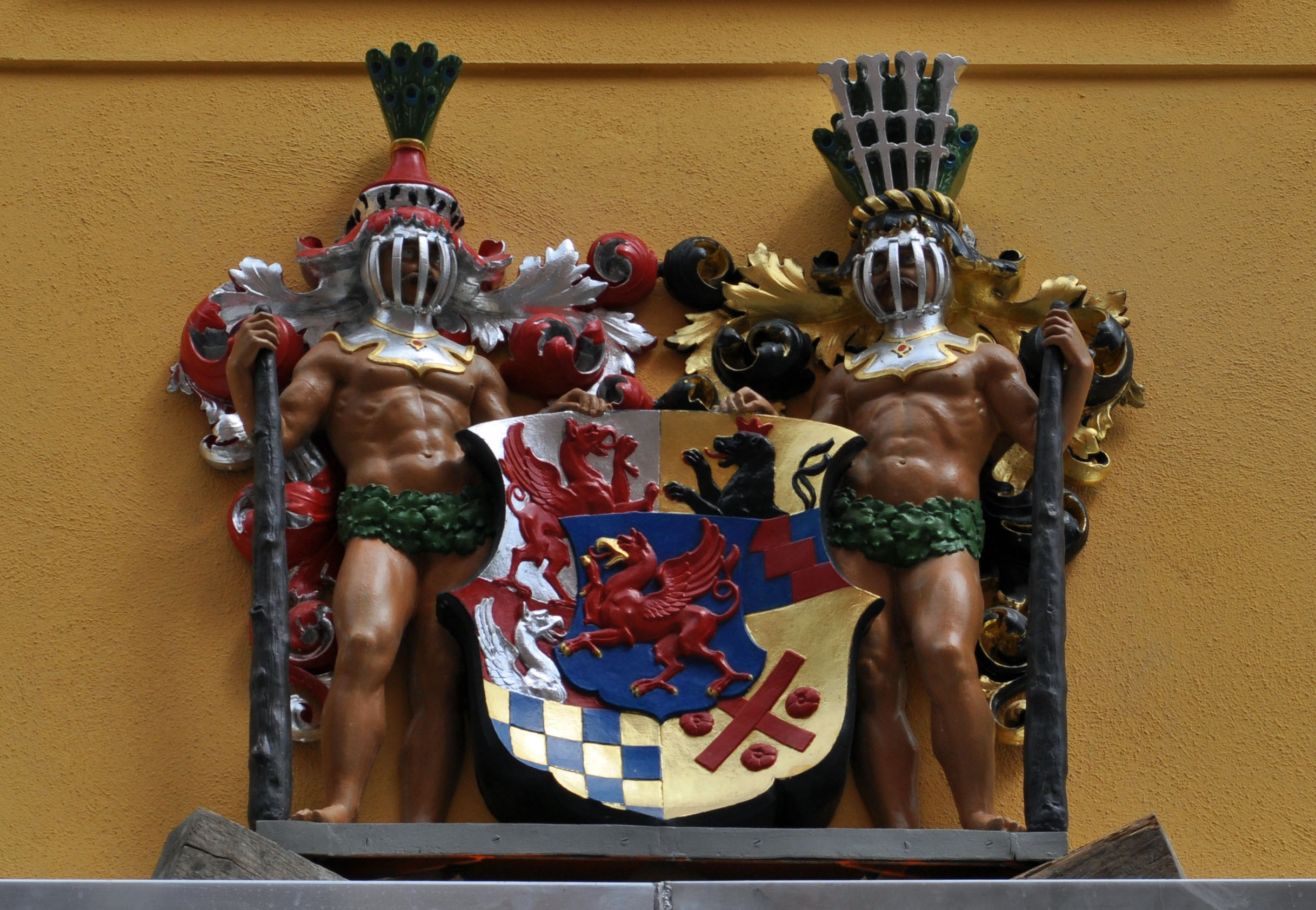
Coat of arms of the estates of New Hither Pomerania above the portal of the House of the Estates of Hither Pomerania in Stralsund

New Western Pomerania or New Hither Pomerania (German: Neuvorpommern or Neu-Vorpommern) was the part of Western Pomerania that passed from Sweden to Prussia under the terms of the Congress of Vienna in 1815.

== History ==
The territory of New Western Pomerania corresponded to that area of earlier region of Swedish Pomerania that had been left after the Treaty of Stockholm in 1720; thus it covered Western Pomerania north of the Peene, including the island of Rügen. The name "New Western Pomerania and Rügen" (Neuvorpommern und Rügen) was also used, which emphasised the territory of Rügen. As early as 1720, the area of Swedish Pomerania that had initially been ceded to Prussia was called, by contrast, Old Western Pomerania (Altvorpommern).

New Western Pomerania was part of the Prussian province of Pomerania and, from 1818, formed the government region of Stralsund, but for a time, retained a special legal status. For example, from the old councils (Stände) of New Western Pomerania, a new Regional Parliament for New Western Pomerania and Rügen (Kommunallandtag von Neuvorpommern und Rügen) was formed in 1823, which existed until 1881. The Pomeranian Provincial Parliament, also formed in 1823, was elected separately by New Western Pomerania, Old Western Pomerania and Farther Pomerania (Hinterpommern). With the gradual loss of its special status, the name New Western Pomerania also became uncommon.

== See also ==
- History of Pomerania

== Literature ==
- Johannes Hinz: Pommern-Lexikon. Geographie, Geschichte, Kultur. Lizenzausgabe. Bechtermünz Verlag, Augsburg, 1996, ISBN 3-86047-185-6, p. 220.
