= Treaty of Schwedt =

1713 treaty between Russia and Brandenburg

The Treaty of Schwedt was concluded on 6 October 1713, during the Great Northern War, between the Tsardom of Russia and Brandenburg-Prussia in Schwedt. Brandenburg-Prussia was promised southern Swedish Pomerania up to the Peene river, which had just been conquered by Russia. In turn, Brandenburg-Prussia accepted Russia's annexation of Swedish Ingria, Estonia and Karelia, and agreed to pay 400,000 thalers to Russia. Southern Swedish Pomerania was to be administered by Brandenburg-Prussia until a definite ruling in a peace treaty was reached.
