= Swedish Pomerania =

Sweden-held lands on the southern Baltic coast (1630–1815)

Coordinates: 54°05′N 13°23′E

Swedish Pomerania Svenska Pommern (Swedish) Schwedisch-Pommern (German)
- 1630–1815
- Flag of Sweden Coat of arms (1660)

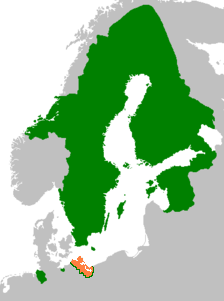
- Swedish Pomerania (orange) within the Swedish Empire in 1658
- Status: Swedish Dominion; State of the Holy Roman Empire until 1806
- Capital: Stettin (Szczecin, 1630–1720); Stralsund (1720–1815)
- Common languages: Low German; German; Swedish
- Religion: Lutheranism
- Government: Principality
- Duke
  - 1630–1632: Gustav II Adolf (first)
  - 1809–1815: Charles XIII (last)
- Governor-General
  - 1633–1641: Sten Svantesson Bielke (first)
  - 1800–1809: Hans Henric von Essen (last)
  - 1809–1815: Direct rule
- History
  - Treaty of Stettin: 10 July 1630
  - Peace of Westphalia: 24 October 1648
  - Treaty of Stettin: 4 May 1653
  - Treaty of Stockholm: 21 January 1720
  - Treaty of Kiel: 14 January 1814
  - Congress of Vienna: 4/7 June 1815
  - Hand-over to Prussia: 23 October 1815
Preceded by	Succeeded by
Duchy of Pomerania	Province of Pomerania
- Today part of: Germany; Poland

Swedish Pomerania (Swedish: Svenska Pommern; German: Schwedisch-Pommern) was a dominion of Sweden from 1630 to 1815 on what is now the Baltic coast of Germany and Poland. Following the Polish War and the Thirty Years' War, Sweden held extensive control over the lands on the southern Baltic coast, including Pomerania and parts of Livonia and Prussia (dominium maris baltici).

Sweden, which had been present in Pomerania with a garrison at Stralsund since 1628, gained effective control of the Duchy of Pomerania with the Treaty of Stettin in 1630. At the Peace of Westphalia in 1648 and the Treaty of Stettin in 1653, Sweden received Western Pomerania (German Vorpommern), with the islands of Rügen, Usedom, and Wolin, and a strip of Farther Pomerania (Hinterpommern).

In 1679, Sweden lost most of its Pomeranian possessions east of the Oder river in the Treaty of Saint-Germain-en-Laye, and in 1720, Sweden lost its possessions south of the Peene and east of the Peenestrom rivers in the Treaty of Stockholm. These areas were ceded to Brandenburg-Prussia and were integrated into Brandenburgian Pomerania. Also in 1720, Sweden regained the remainder of its dominion which had been occupied by Denmark in 1715. In 1814, as a result of the Napoleonic Wars, Swedish Pomerania was ceded to Denmark in exchange for Norway in the Treaty of Kiel, and in 1815, as a result of the Congress of Vienna, transferred to Prussia.

== Geography ==
The largest cities in Swedish Pomerania were Stralsund, Greifswald and, until 1720, Stettin (now Szczecin).

== Acquisition during the Thirty Years' War ==
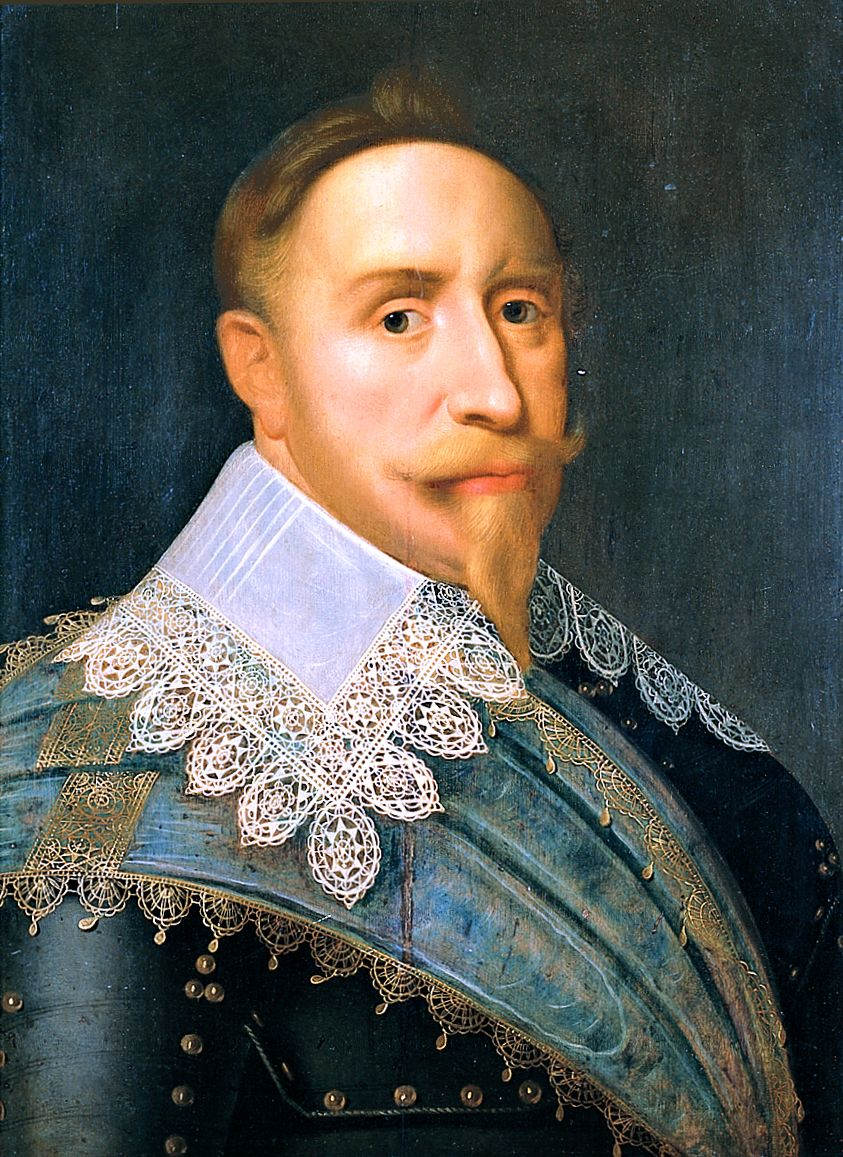
Gustav II Adolf

Pomerania became involved in the Thirty Years' War during the 1620s, and with the town of Stralsund under siege by imperial troops, its ruler Bogislaw XIV, Duke of Stettin, concluded a treaty with King Gustavus Adolphus of Sweden in June 1628. On 10 July 1630, the treaty was extended into an 'eternal' pact in the Treaty of Stettin (1630). By the end of that year, the Swedes had completed the military occupation of Pomerania. After this point, Gustavus Adolphus was the effective ruler of the country, and even though the rights of succession to Pomerania, held by George William, Elector of Brandenburg due to the Treaty of Grimnitz, were recognised, the Swedish king still demanded that the Margraviate of Brandenburg break with Emperor Ferdinand II. In 1634, the Estates of Pomerania assigned the interim government to an eight-member directorate, which lasted until Brandenburg ordered the directorate disbanded in 1638 by right of Imperial investiture.

Map of the territorial changes of Swedish Pomerania in 1630–1815.

As a consequence, Pomerania lapsed into a state of anarchy, thereby forcing the Swedes to act. From 1641, the administration was led by a council ("Concilium status") from Stettin (Szczecin), until the peace treaty in 1648 settled rights to the province in Swedish favour. At the peace negotiations in Osnabrück, Brandenburg-Prussia received Farther Pomerania (Hinterpommern), the part of the former Duchy of Pomerania east of the Oder River except Stettin. A strip of land east of the Oder River containing the districts of Damm and Gollnow and the island of Wolin and Western Pomerania (Vorpommern) with the islands of Rügen and Usedom, was ceded to the Swedes as a fief from Emperor Ferdinand III. The recess of Stettin in 1653 settled the border with Brandenburg in a manner favourable to Sweden. The border against Mecklenburg, along the Trebel and the Recknitz, followed a settlement of 1591.

== Constitution and administration ==
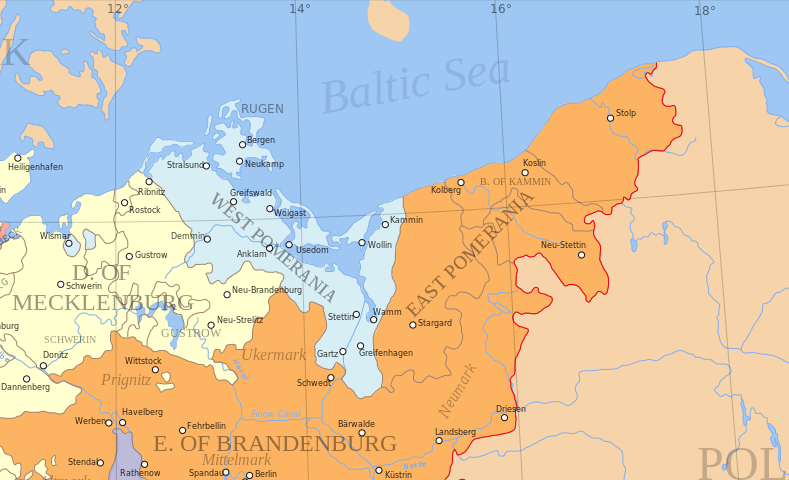
The former Duchy of Pomerania (center) partitioned between the Swedish Empire and Brandenburg after the Treaty of Stettin (1653). Swedish Pomerania ("West Pomerania") is indicated in blue, Brandenburgian Pomerania ("East Pomerania") is shown in orange.

Map of Swedish Pomerania, 1679

Map of Swedish Pomerania (c. 1760)

The nobility of Pomerania was firmly established and held extensive privileges, as opposed to the other end of the social spectrum, which was populated by a class of numerous serfs. Even by the end of the 18th century, the serfs made up two-thirds of the population of the countryside. The estates owned by the nobility were divided into districts and the royal domains, which covered about a quarter of the country, were divided into amts.

The peace treaties were negotiated while the Swedish queen Christina was a minor, and the Swedish Empire was governed by members of the high aristocracy. As a consequence, Pomerania was not annexed to Sweden like the French war gains, which would have meant abolition of serfdom, as the Pomeranian peasant and shepherd regulation of 1616 was practised there in its most severe form. Instead, it remained part of the Holy Roman Empire, making the Swedish rulers Reichsfürsten (imperial princes) and leaving the nobility in full charge of the rural areas and its inhabitants. While the Swedish Pomeranian nobles were subjected to reduction when the late 17th-century kings regained political power, the provisions of the peace of Westphalia continued to prevent the pursuit of the uniformity policy in Pomerania until the Holy Roman Empire was dissolved in 1806.

One fourth of the "knightly" estates (Rittergut) in Swedish Pomerania were held by Swedish nobles. The ducal estates (Domäne), initially distributed among Swedish nobles (two thirds) and officials, became in 1654 administered by the former Swedish queen Christina. Swedish and Pomeranian nobility intermarried and became ethnically indistinguishable in the course of the 18th century.

The position of Pomerania in the Swedish Realm came to depend on the talks that were opened between the Estates of Pomerania and the Government of Sweden. The talks showed few results until the Instrument of Government of 17 July 1663 (promulgated by the recess of 10 April 1669) could be presented, and only in 1664 did the Pomeranian Estates salute the Swedish Monarch as their new ruler.

The Royal Government of Pomerania (die königliche Landesregierung) was composed of the Governor-General, who always was a Swedish Privy Councillor, as chairman and five Councillors of the Royal Government, among them the President of the Appellate Court, the Chancellor and the Castle Captain of Stettin, over inspector of the Royal Amts. When circumstances demanded, the estates, nobility, burgesses, and — until the 1690s — the clergy could be summoned for meetings of a local parliament called the Landtag. The nobility was represented by one deputy per district, and these deputies were in turn mandated by their respective district convents of nobles. The estate of the burgesses consisted of one deputy per politically franchised city, particularly Stralsund. The Landtag were presided over by a marshal (Erb-landmarschall). A third element of the meeting of the Estates were the five, initially ten, Landtag councillors who were appointed by the Royal Government of Pomerania following their nomination by the Estates. The Landtag councillors formed the Land Council, which mediated with the Swedish Government and oversaw the constitution.

The Estates, which had exercised great authority under the Pomeranian dukes, were unable to exert any significant influence on Sweden, even though the Constitution of 1663 had provided them with a veto in as far as Pomerania was affected. Their rights of petition were however not limited, and by the privileges of King Frederick I of Sweden in 1720 they also had an explicit right to participate in legislation and taxation.

The towns of Stralsund, Stettin, Greifswald and Anklam were granted autonomous jurisdiction.

== Legal system ==
The legal system in Pomerania had been in a state of great confusion, owing to the lack of a consistent legislation or even the most basic collection of laws; instead it consisted of a disparate collection of legal principles. The Swedish rule brought, if nothing else, at least the rule of law into the court system. Starting in 1655, cases could be appealed from the first instance courts to the appellate court in Greifswald (located in Wolgast from 1665 to 1680), where sentences were issued under the appellate law of 1672, a work conducted by David Mevius. Cases under canon law were directed to a consistorium in Greifswald. From the appellate court cases could be appealed to the supreme court for the Swedish dominions in Germany, the High Tribunal in Wismar, which had opened in 1653.

== Second Northern and Scanian Wars ==
From 1657 to 1659 during the Second Northern War, Polish, Austrian, and Brandenburger troops ravaged the country. The territory was occupied by Denmark and Brandenburg from 1675 to 1679 during the Scanian War, whereby Denmark claimed Rügen and Brandenburg the rest of Pomerania. Both campaigns were in vain for the winners when Swedish Pomerania was restored to Sweden in the Treaty of Saint-Germain-en-Laye in 1679, except for Gollnow and the strip of land on the east side of the Oder, which were held by Brandenburg as a pawn in exchange for reparations, until these were paid in 1693.

Because Pomerania had been hit hard by the Thirty Years' War already and found it hard to recover during the following years, the Swedish government in 1669 and 1689 issued decrees (Freiheitspatente) freeing anyone of taxes who built or rebuilt a house. These decrees were in force, though frequently modified, until 1824.

== Territorial changes during the Great Northern War ==
The first years of the Great Northern War did not affect Pomerania. Even when Danish, Russian, and Polish forces had crossed the borders in 1714, the Kingdom of Prussia first appeared as a hesitant mediator before turning into an aggressor. King Charles XII of Sweden in the Battle of Stralsund led the defence of Pomerania for an entire year, November 1714 to December 1715, before fleeing to Lund. The Danes seized Rügen and Western Pomerania north of the Peene River (the former Danish Principality of Rugia that later would become known as New Western Pomerania or Neuvorpommern), while the Western Pomeranian areas south of the river (later termed Old Western Pomerania or Altvorpommern) were taken by Prussia.

Beginning in April 1716 Danish Pomerania was governed by a governmental commission seated in Stralsund, consisting of five members. In contrast to the Swedish administration, the commission exerted both judiciary and executive power. Denmark thereby drew from the experiences in Danish-occupied Bremen-Verden (1712–1715), the setting of the Danish chancellery, and the contemporary Danish absolutism under king Frederik IV of Denmark-Norway. The commission consisted of landdrost von Platen, later von Kötzschau, counsellors Heinrich Bernhard von Kämpferbeck, J. B. Hohenmühle and Peter von Thienen, and chancellor secretary August J. von John. In 1720, von Kämpferbeck died and was replaced by Andreas Boye.

By the Treaty of Frederiksborg, 3 June 1720, Denmark was obliged to hand back control over the occupied territory to Sweden, but in the Treaty of Stockholm, on 21 January the same year, Prussia had been allowed to retain its conquest, including Stettin. By this, Sweden ceded the parts east of the Oder River that had been won in 1648 as well as Western Pomerania south of the Peene and the islands of Wolin and Usedom to Brandenburg-Prussia.

Denmark returned its Pomeranian territories to Swedish administration on 17 January 1721. The administrative records from the Danish period were transferred to Copenhagen and are available at the Danish National Archives (rigsarkivet).

== Seven Years' War ==
A feeble Swedish attempt to regain the lost territories in the Pomeranian campaigns of the Seven Years' War (1757–1762, "Pomeranian War") failed. Swedish troops struggled to co-ordinate with their French and Russian allies, and what had begun as a Swedish invasion of Prussian Pomerania soon led to the Prussians occupying much of Swedish Pomerania and threatening Stralsund. When Russia made peace with Prussia in 1762, Sweden also dropped out of the war with a return to the status quo ante bellum. Sweden's disappointing performance in the war further hurt its international prestige.

== Integration in 1806 ==
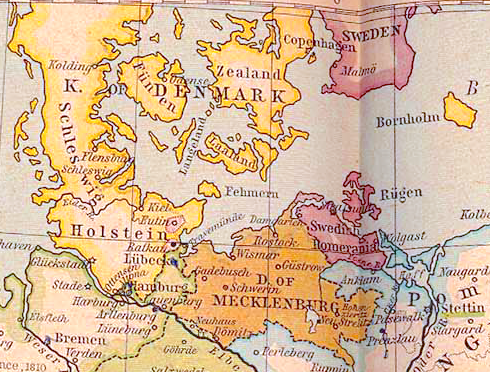
Swedish Pomerania (centre-right) in 1812

By royal proclamation on 26 June 1806, the Constitution of Pomerania was declared to have been suspended and abolished. The Swedish Instruments of Government of 1772, the Act of Union and Security of 1789, and the Law of 1734 were declared to have taken precedence and were to be implemented following 1 September 1808. The reason for perpetrating this royally sanctioned coup d'état was that the estates, despite a royal prohibition, had taken to the courts to appeal against royal statutes, specifically the statute of 30 April 1806 regarding the raising of a Pomeranian army. In the new order, King Gustav IV Adolf of Sweden attempted to introduce a government divided into departments. Swedish church law was introduced. The country was divided into four hundreds (Härad) containing parishes (Socken) complying with the Swedish model of administration. The Estates of Pomerania could only be called regarding questions that specifically concerned Pomerania and Rügen. The new order of the Landtag was modelled on the Swedish Riksdag of the Estates and a meeting according to the new order also took place in August 1806, which declared its loyalty to the king and hailed him as their ruler. In the wake of this revolution, a number of social reforms were implemented and planned; the most important was the abolition of serfdom by a royal statute on 4 July 1806.

Also in 1806, Gustav IV Adolf started constructing another major port city in Pomerania, Gustavia. Yet by 1807, French forces had occupied the site.

== Loss during the Napoleonic Wars ==
The entry into the Third Coalition in 1805, in which Sweden unsuccessfully fought its first war against Napoleon, subsequently led to the occupation of Swedish Pomerania by French troops, beginning in 1807. Under the Treaty of Paris, signed in 1810, the territory was returned to Sweden. In 1812, when French troops yet again marched into Pomerania, the Swedish Army joined the Sixth Coalition and assisted against Napoleon in the Battle of Leipzig in 1813, together with troops from Russia, Prussia, and Austria. Sweden also attacked Denmark and, by the Treaty of Kiel on 14 January 1814, Sweden ceded Pomerania to Denmark in exchange for Norway.

The fate of Swedish Pomerania was settled during the Congress of Vienna through the treaties between Prussia and Denmark on 4 June and with Sweden on 7 June 1815. In this manoeuvre Prussia gained Swedish Pomerania in exchange for Saxe-Lauenburg, becoming Danish, with Prussia having bartered previously Hanoverian Saxe-Lauenburg only 14 years earlier in exchange for East Frisia ceded to Hanover again. Denmark also received 2.6 million Thalers from Prussia. 3.5 million Thalers were awarded to Sweden in war damages. "Swedish Pomerania" was incorporated into Prussia as New Western Pomerania (Neuvorpommern) within the Prussian Province of Pomerania.

== Population ==
The population of Swedish Pomerania was 82,827 in 1764, (58,682 rural, 24,145 urban; 40% of the rural population were leibeigen serfs); 89,000 in 1766, 113,000 in 1802, with about a quarter living on the island of Rügen, and had reached 118,112 in 1805 (79,087 rural, 39,025 urban; 46,190 of the rural population were leibeigen serfs).

== List of governors-general ==
- Sten Svantesson Bielke (1633–1638)
- Johan Banér (1638–1641)
- Lennart Torstenson (1641–1648)
- Carl Gustaf Wrangel (1648–1652)
- Axel Lillie (1652–1654)
- Arvid Wittenberg (1655–1656)
- Carl Gustaf Wrangel (1656–1676)
- Otto Wilhelm Königsmarck (1679–1687)
- Nils Bielke (1687–1698)
- Jürgen Mellin (1698–1711)
- Mauritz Vellingk (1711–1713)

Danish governors general (1715–1721)

  - Franz Joachim von Dewitz (1715–1719)
  - Jobst von Scholten (1719–1721)
- Johan August Meijerfeldt the elder (1713–1747)
- Axel Löwen (1748–1767)
- Hans Henrik von Liewen the younger (1767–1772)
- Fredrik Cornelius Soels de Witterzée (1772–1776)
- Fredrik Vilhelm von Hessenstein (1776–1791)
- Eric Ruuth (1792–1795)
- Filip Julius Bernhard von Platen (1796–1800)
- Hans Henric von Essen (1800–1812)

French governors general (1807–1813)

  - Guillaume Marie-Anne Brune (August 1807)
  - Gabriel Jean Joseph Molitor (October 1807)
  - Jacques Lazare de Savattier de Candras (November 1807–March 1808)
  - Joseph Morand (1812–1813)
- Johan August Sandels (1812–1815)
- Wilhelm Malte zu Putbus (1815)

== Notable people ==
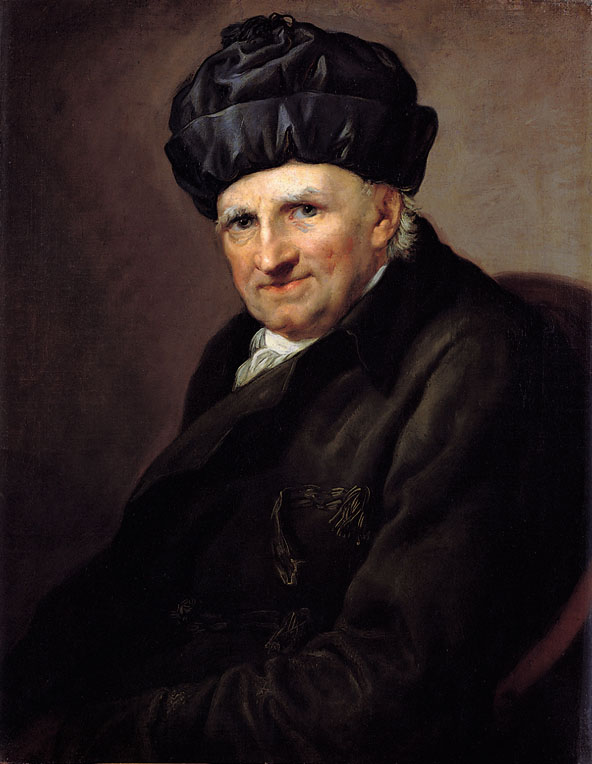
Johann Joachim Spalding, 1800

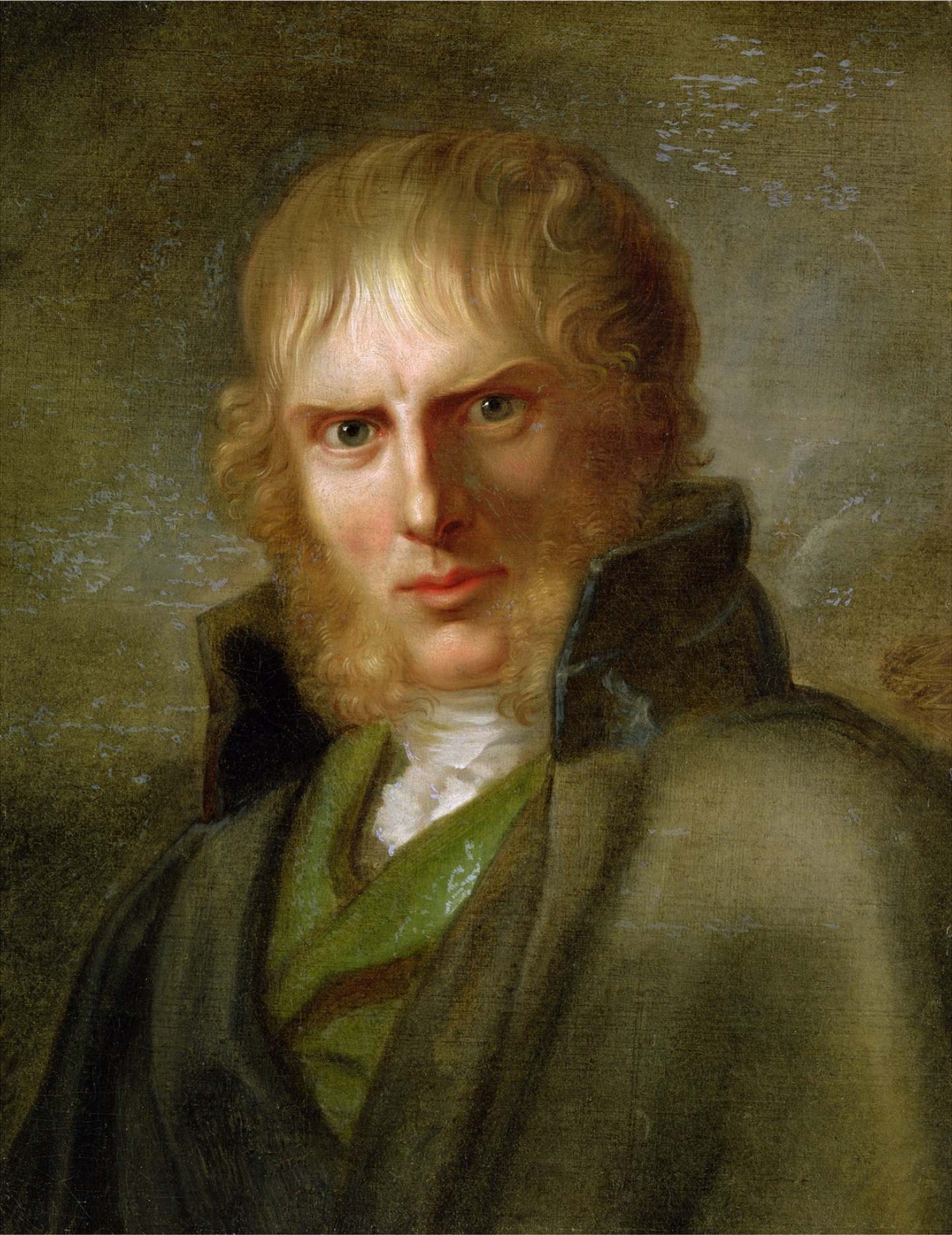
portrait of Caspar David Friedrich, c.1810

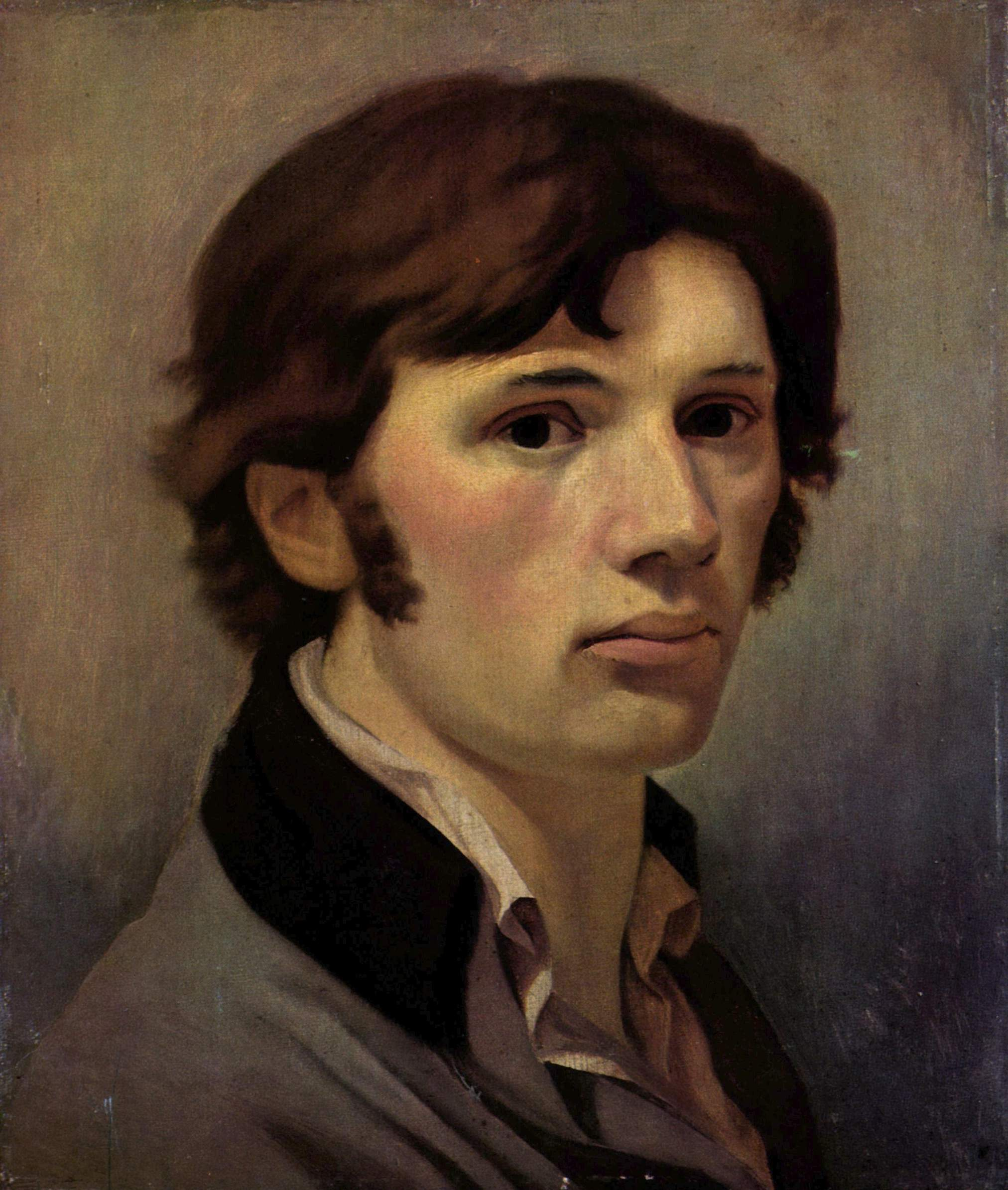
Philipp Otto Runge

- Johann Franz Buddeus (1667–1729) a German Lutheran theologian and philosopher; born at Anklam
- Johann Philipp Palthen (1672–1710) a Western Pomeranian historian and philologist; born in Wolgast
- Philip Johan von Strahlenberg (1676–1747) a Swedish officer and geographer, contributed to the cartography of Russia; born in Stralsund,
- Johann Joachim Spalding (1714–1804) a German Protestant theologian and philosopher of Scottish ancestry; a native of Tribsees
- Aaron Isaac (1730–1817) a Jewish seal engraver and merchant in haberdashery; came from Pommery
- Balthasar Anton Dunker (1746–1807) a German landscape painter and etcher, born at Saal, near Stralsund.
- Carl Wilhelm Scheele (1742–1786) a Swedish Pomeranian and German pharmaceutical chemist; born in Stralsund
- Christian Ehrenfried Weigel (1748–1831) a German scientist, professor of Chemistry, Pharmacy, Botany, and Mineralogy at the University of Greifswald; born in Stralsund, died in Griefswald
- Thomas Thorild (1759–1808) a Swedish poet, critic, feminist and philosopher; died at Greifswald
- Ernst Moritz Arndt (1769–1860) a German nationalist historian, writer and poet; born at Gross Schoritz, now a part of Garz on the island of Rügen
- Caspar David Friedrich (1774–1840) a German Romantic landscape painter; born in Greifswald
- Philipp Otto Runge (1777–1810) a Romantic German painter and draughtsman; born in Wolgast
- Johann Gottfried Ludwig Kosegarten (1792–1860) a German orientalist born in Altenkirchen on the island of Rugen, died in Greifswald
- Georg Friedrich Schömann (1793–1879) a German classical scholar of Swedish heritage; born in Stralsund
- Arnold Ruge (1802–1880) German philosopher and political writer; born in Bergen auf Rügen
- Johann Karl Rodbertus (1805–1875) a German economist and socialist of the scientific or conservative school; came from Greifswald
- Adolf Friedrich Stenzler (1807–1887) a German Indologist; born in Wolgast
- Joachim Daniel Andreas Müller (1812–1857) a Swedish gardener and writer; born in Stralsund
- Max von Sydow (1929–2020) a Swedish Actor of Pomeranian lineage

=== Nobility ===
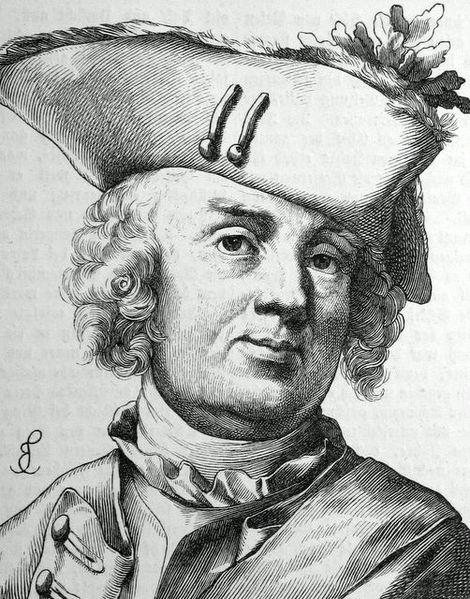
Kurt Christoph Graf von Schwerin

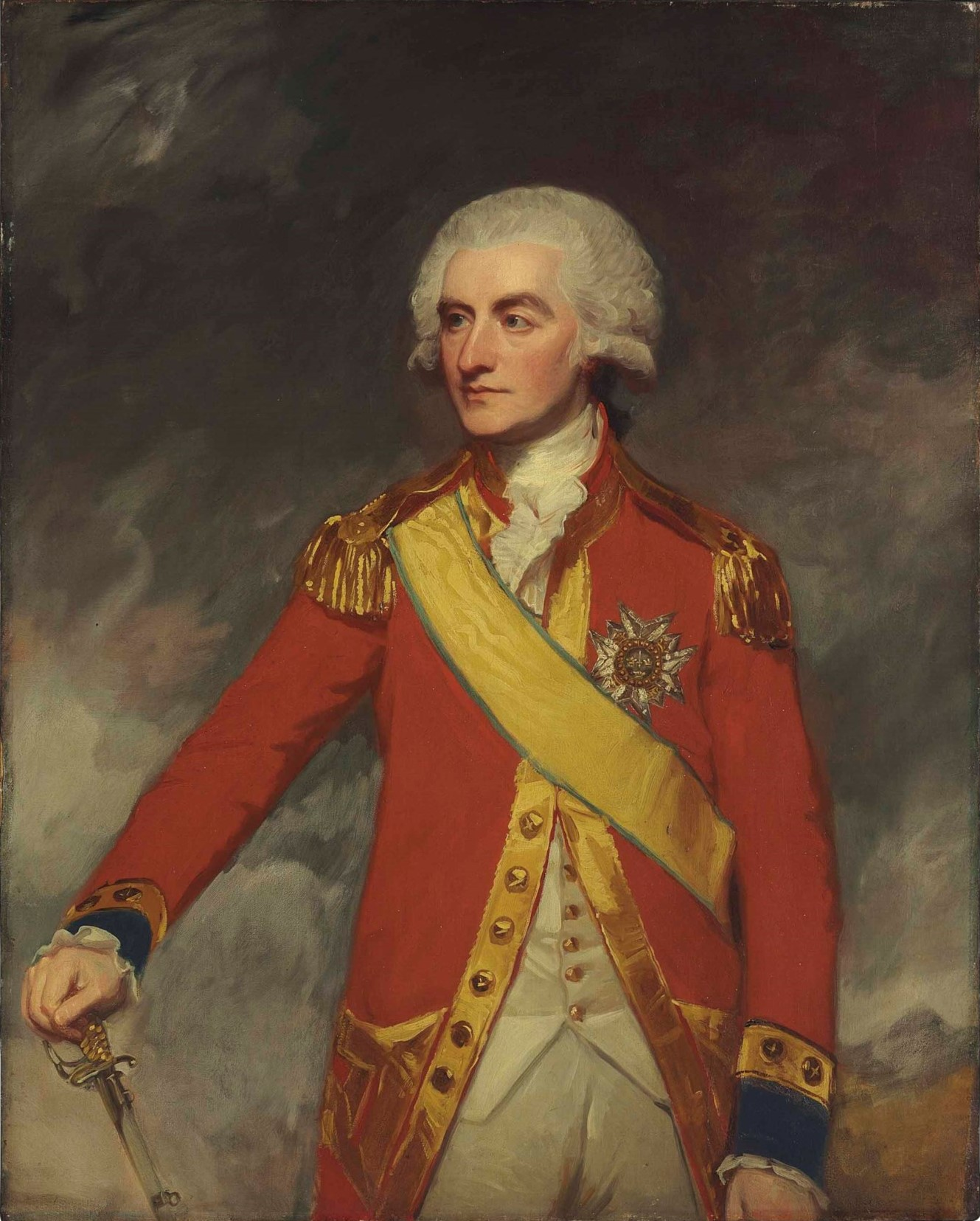
Lord Macleod

- Count Carl Gustav Rehnskiöld (1651–1722) a Swedish Field Marshal; born in Stralsund
- Christof Beetz (1670–1746 in Stralsund) Platz-Major and Stabs-Major of the military garrison in Stralsund
- Kurt Christoph, Graf von Schwerin (1684–1757) a Prussian Generalfeldmarschall; born in Löwitz
- Georg Detlev von Flemming (1699–1771) a General in Polish-Saxon service; was born in Iven
- Gustaf David Hamilton (1699–1788) a Swedish count and soldier; commander of Swedish Pommeranian forces during the Seven Years' War
- Hans Karl von Winterfeldt (1707–1757) a Prussian general; born at Vanselow Castle, now in Siedenbrünzow
- John Mackenzie, Lord MacLeod (1727–1789) a Scottish Jacobite, soldier of fortune and mercenary
- Curt Bogislaus Ludvig Kristoffer von Stedingk (1746–1837) a Swedish army officer and diplomat
- Bernhard Ditlef von Staffeldt (1753–1818) officer, born in Kenz
- Count Baltzar Bogislaus von Platen (1766–1829) a Swedish naval officer and statesman; born on the island of Rügen
- Friedrich August von Klinkowström (1778–1835) a German artist, author and teacher from an old Pomeranian noble family; born in Ludwigsburg
- Wilhelm Malte I, Prince of Putbus (1783–1854) a German prince, acted as a Swedish governor in Swedish Pomerania; born in Putbus, Rügen

== See also ==
- History of Sweden
- Swedish Empire
- Dominions of Sweden
- Pomerania during the Early Modern Age
