= Treaties of Stockholm (Great Northern War) =

1719 and 1720 peace treaties between Sweden and allied Hanover and Prussia

The Treaties of Stockholm were two treaties signed in 1719 and 1720 that ended the war between Sweden and an alliance of Hanover and Prussia.

Aspects of the conflict that remained unresolved would be dealt with by two further treaties, the Treaty of Frederiksborg between Sweden and Denmark-Norway in 1720 and the Treaty of Nystad between Sweden and Russia in 1721.

Frederick I began negotiating the Treaties of Stockholm following the death of Charles XII of Sweden in 1718. The death of the Swedish monarch heralded the impending conclusion of the Great Northern War.

== Treaty with Hanover ==
In the treaty with Hanover on 9 November 1719, Sweden ceded the dominion of Bremen-Verden.

== Treaty with Prussia ==
On 21 January 1720, Sweden ceded Swedish Pomerania south of the river Peene and east of the river Peenestrom to Prussia, including the islands of Usedom and Wollin, and the towns of Stettin, Damm and Gollnow. The treaty was formalized in 1720, and became effective when Frederick William I of Prussia issued a patent declaring the ceded area to be part of Prussia on 29 May 1720. The parts of Swedish Pomerania that were to remain with Sweden were then under Danish occupation, and were restored to Sweden in the Treaty of Frederiksborg on 3 July 1720.
