= Sibylla Schwarz =

German poet of the Baroque era

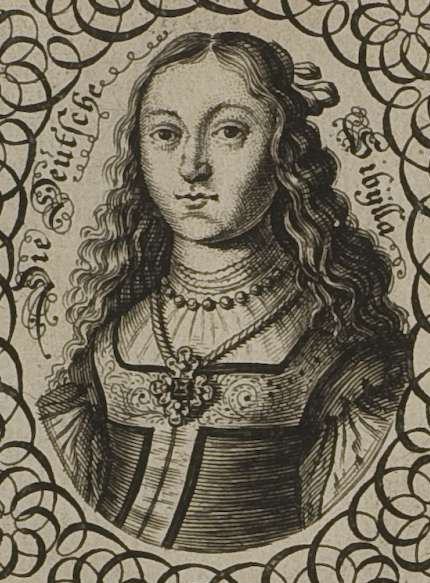
Sibylla Schwarz portrait from 1650.

Sibylla Schwarz, also known as Sibylle Schwartz (14/24 February 1621 in Greifswald – 31 July/10 August 1638 in Greifswald) was a German poet of the Baroque era.

== Life ==
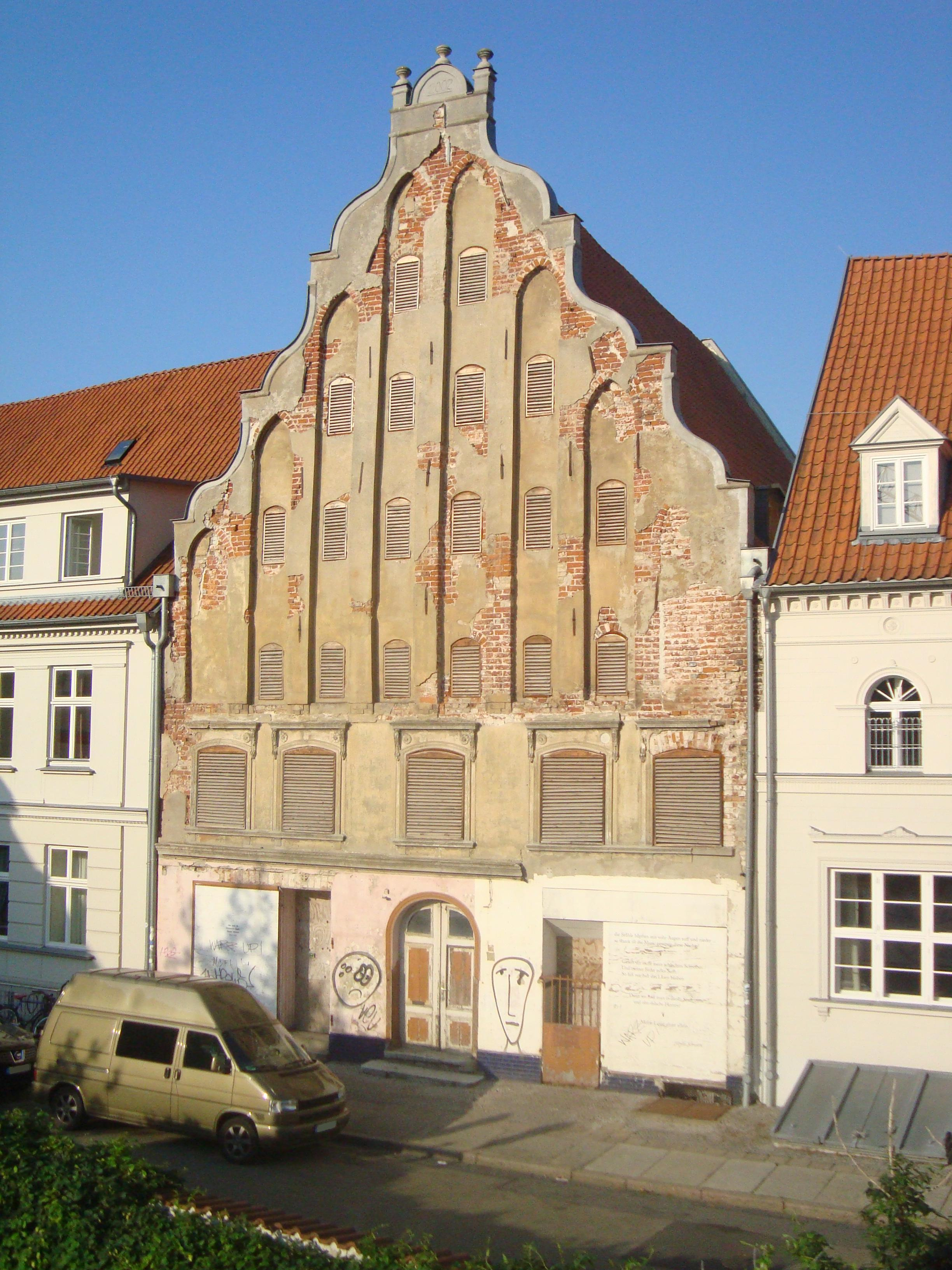
Sibylla's baroque house in Greifswald.

Sibylla Schwarz was the daughter of Christian Schwarz (1581–1648), mayor of Greifswald, and Regina Schwarz.

Her life was relatively untroubled until the Thirty Years' War reached Greifswald in 1627 and her mother suddenly died in 1630. She began to write poetry at the age of seven. Her verse reflects the difficult times in the middle of the Thirty Years' War, of which she saw neither the beginning nor the end. Greifswald was first occupied by Wallenstein and then by the Swedish army under Gustavus Adolphus. Important themes in her work include friendship, love, war and death. In 1638 she suddenly fell ill and died at the age of 17.

Her verse was published posthumously in 1650 by her teacher Samuel Gerlach under the title Deutsche Poëtische Gedichte in two parts containing over 100 poems. She was famous as the "Pomeranian Sappho", but her work fell into oblivion in the 18th century. Literary historians began to pay renewed attention to her in the 19th century as one of the few notable female writers of Baroque literature in German.

== Selected bibliography ==
=== Edition ===
- Sibyllen Schwarzin/ Vohn Greiffswald aus Pommern/ Deutsche Poëtische Gedichte/ Nuhn Zum ersten mahl/ auß ihren eignen Handschrifften/ herauß gegeben und verleget. Danzig 1650. (Digitalisat im Internet Archive)
- Sibylle Schwarz: Deutsche Poëtische Gedichte. Facsimile of the edition of 1650. Edited with an afterword by Helmut W. Ziefle. Bern, Frankfurt am Main, Las Vegas: Peter Lang, 1980.

=== Secondary literature ===
- Guido K. Brand: Die Frühvollendeten. Ein Beitrag zur Literaturgeschichte. Berlin: W. de Gruyter & Co. 1929 [1928]. S. 26–30.
- Kurt Gassen: Sibylle Schwarz, eine pommersche Dichterin, in: Pommersche Jahrbücher, Vol. 21 (1921), 1–108
- Ludwig Giesebrecht: Über einige Gedichte der Sibylle Schwarz. Stettin 1865
- Helmut W. Ziefle: Sibylle Schwarz, Leben und Werke. Bonn 1975
- Gerhard Dünnhaupt: Sibylle Schwarz, in: Personalbibliographien zu den Drucken des Barock, Vol. 5. Stuttgart: Hiersemann 1991, pp. 3895–96 (Werk- und Literaturverzeichnis). ISBN 3-7772-9133-1
- Ganzenmueller, Petra: Wider die Ges(ch)ichtslosigkeit der Frau. Weibliche Selbstbewußtwerdung zu Anfang des 17. Jahrhunderts am Beispiel der Sibylle Schwarz. Diss., Vancouver 1998.
- Gugrel-Steindl, Susanne: Ausgewählte dramatische Literatur von Andreas Gryphius, Johann Christian Hallmann und Sibylle Schwarz. Diss., Wien 1991.
- Weiß, Konrad: SCHWARZ, Sibylla. In: Biographisch-Bibliographisches Kirchenlexikon, Vol. XXIII (2004), Sp. 1331–1337, ISBN 3-88309-155-3.
- Ziefle, Helmut W.: Sibylle Schwarz: Leben und Werk. Bonn: Bouvier, 1975 (Studien zur Germanistik, Anglistik und Komparatistik; Bd. 35).
