= Sten Svantesson Bielke =

Swedish politician

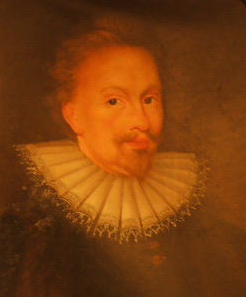
Sten(o) Bielke

Sten Svantesson Bielke, also Steno Bielke, (1598 – 2 April 1638) was a statesman of the Swedish Empire.

Bielke studied in Uppsala and Tübingen before he became chamberlain of Gustavus Adolphus of Sweden in 1619. Together with Bengt Bengtson Oxenstierna, he traveled to Jerusalem and other sites in the Holy Land in 1613, 1619 and 1623. From 1627 to 1629, he attended the University of Leiden.

In 1630, he was Swedish commander in Stralsund. In 1631, he was appointed Swedish legate in occupied Pomerania, succeeding Carl Banér. He occupied this position until his death. In 1633, Bielke became a member of the riksråd. In 1636, he was appointed general legate in Germany. He died on 2 April 1638 in Stettin (now Szczecin).

== See also ==
- Treaty of Stettin (1630)

== Bibliography ==
- Backhaus, Helmut (1969). Reichsterritorium und schwedische Provinz: Vorpommern unter Karls XI. Vormündern 1660-1672 (in German). Vandenhoeck u. Ruprecht.
- Giese, Simone (2003). "Peregrination academica oder Kavalierstour - Bildungsreisen des schwedischen Adels zur Beginn der frühen Neuzeit". In Asmus, Ivo; Droste, Heiko; Olesen, Jens E. (eds.). Gemeinsame Bekannte: Schweden und Deutschland in der Frühen Neuzeit (in German). Berlin-Hamburg-Münster: LIT Verlag. ISBN 3-8258-7150-9.
- Öhman, Jenny (2005). Der Kampf um den Frieden: Schweden und der Kaiser im Dreissigjährigen Krieg (in German). öbv&hpt. ISBN 3-209-05052-X.
- Olesen, Jens E (2003). "Christian IV og dansk Pommernpolitik". In Asmus, Ivo; Droste, Jens E.; Olesen (eds.). Gemeinsame Bekannte: Schweden und Deutschland in der Frühen Neuzeit (in Danish). Berlin-Hamburg-Münster: LIT Verlag. ISBN 3-8258-7150-9.
- Wild, Adolf (2000). Les papiers de Richelieu: Empire Allemand, 1636-1642 (in German) (3 ed.). Pedone. ISBN 2-233-00365-9.
