= Capitulation of Franzburg =

1627 capitulation treaty of Pomerania to the Holy Roman Empire

The capitulation of Franzburg (German: Franzburger Kapitulation) was a treaty providing for the capitulation of the Duchy of Pomerania to the forces of the Holy Roman Empire during the Thirty Years' War. It was signed on 10 November (O.S.) or 20 November (N.S.) 1627 (Note: In the 17th century, the Julian calendar was used in the region, which then was ten days late compared to the Gregorian calendar; 10 November – Julian, 20 November – Gregorian.) by Bogislaw XIV, Duke of Pomerania, and Hans Georg von Arnim, commander in chief of an occupation force belonging to the army of Ferdinand II, Holy Roman Emperor, led by Albrecht von Wallenstein. While the terms of the capitulation were unfavourable for the Duchy of Pomerania already, occupation became even more burdensome when the occupation force did not adhere to the restrictions outlined in Franzburg. Stralsund resisted with Danish, Swedish and Scottish support, another Danish intervention failed. Imperial occupation lasted until Swedish forces invaded in 1630, and subsequently cleared all of the Duchy of Pomerania of imperial forces until 1631.

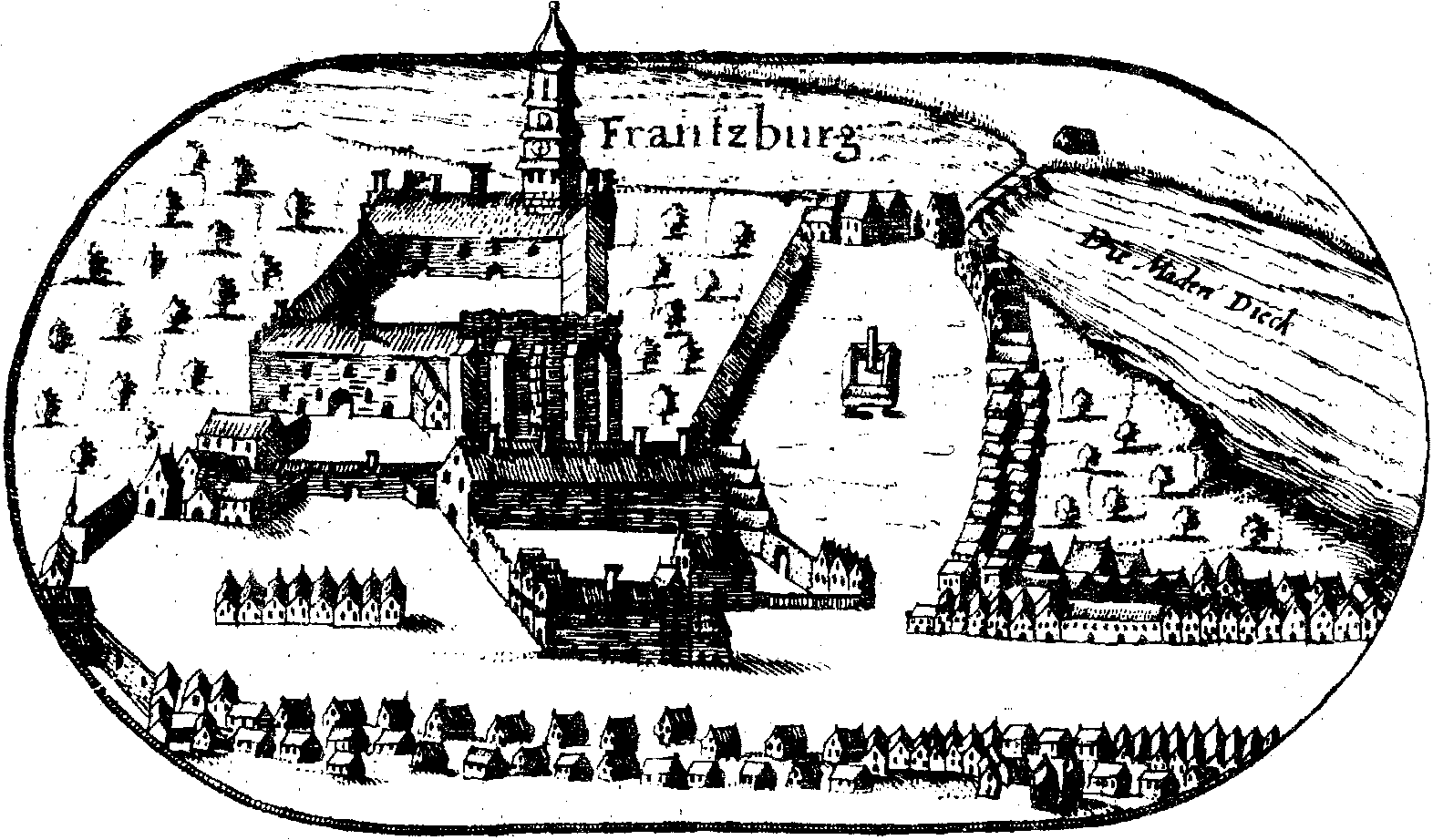
Franzburg, Western Pomerania, in 1618

== Background ==
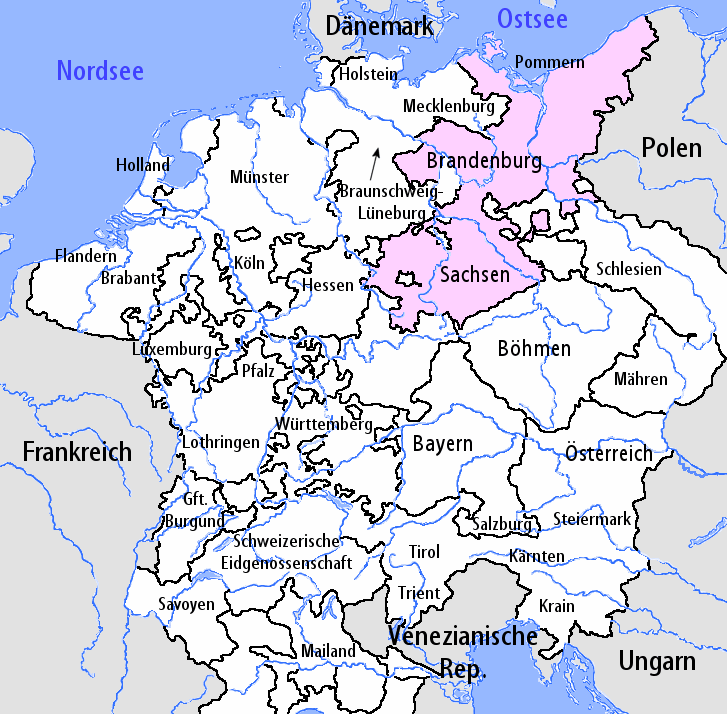
Location of the Duchy of Pomerania ("Pommern") within the Upper Saxon Circle (rose) of the Holy Roman Empire (white)

The Duchy of Pomerania adopted Protestantism in 1534. With the Second Defenestration of Prague in 1618, the Thirty Years' War started as a primarily Catholic-Protestant conflict between Ferdinand II, Holy Roman Emperor, and the Catholic League on the one side and Protestant nobility and states on the other. Pomerania was a member of the internally divided Protestant Upper Saxon Circle, that most prominently included the electorates of Saxony and Brandenburg, and had declared neutrality in 1620. Facing a victorious Catholic League, the Saxon electorate switched to the emperor's side in 1624, while Brandenburg and Pomerania kept resisting imperial demands. Aware of the League's military superiority however, they refused an alliance offered by Protestant Denmark.

In 1625, imperial forces led by Albrecht von Wallenstein occupied the Lower Saxon prince-bishoprics of Magdeburg and Halberstadt, thereby also occupying and looting the Upper Saxon counties of Honstein and Wernigerode. Wallenstein's army had been raised to support the League's forces commanded by Johann Tserclaes, Count of Tilly.

As a countermeasure, Danish forces led by Ernst von Mansfeld occupied the Brandenburgian regions Altmark and Prignitz southwest of Pomerania also in 1625, but were defeated by the Imperial troops in the Battle of Dessau Bridge in 1626. Except for The Electorate of Saxony, which was treated by Wallenstein as a de facto member of the Catholic League, the Upper Saxon states, bare of sufficient military means for self-defence, were subsequently occupied and devastated by the imperial forces after Denmark had been neutralized. Formally, the circle maintained neutrality.

In November 1626, the Swedish Empire recruited troops in Pomerania even though the duke had disapproved. In February 1627, Swedish troops crossed the duchy for Poland, an imperial ally Sweden was at war with. In July, imperial troops crossed into the duchy near Pyritz (now Pyrzyce). To prevent the pending occupation, duke Bogislaw XIV offered 60,000 Talers in October, later raised to 200,000 Talers. Unimpressed Albrecht von Wallenstein instead ordered Hans-Georg von Arnim to occupy all Pomeranian ports and to confiscate all vessels.

The occupation of Pomerania was a strategical measure rather than punishment for prior disobedience. It was implemented to secure the southern coastline of the Baltic Sea for the empire against Christian IV of Denmark, whose land forces were operating on imperial soil until the Treaty of Lübeck in 1629, and whose naval dominance in the Baltic Sea the empire was unable to challenge.

== Provisions ==
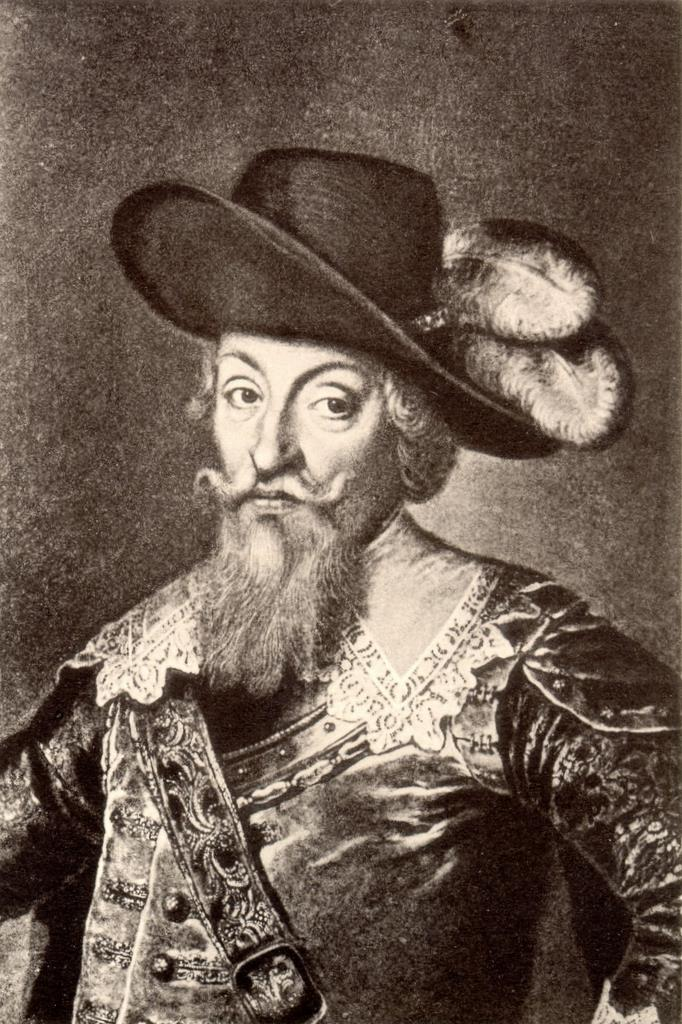
Hans Georg von Arnim, signed for the empire

The treaty ruled on the conditions of the billeting ("hospitatio") of the Imperial troops. Sources vary on whether Bogislaw XIV obliged himself to the intake of eight or ten regiments (approximately 24,000 soldiers). According to Herbert Langer, twenty multi-ethnic regiments with a total of 31,000 infantry and 7,540 cavalry were actually counted. To this number added military staff and civilian baggage of unknown number.

In general, all towns and villages were required to quarter the troops, exempted were specified domains of the House of Pomerania, estates of knights, houses of clergy, councillors and academics, as well as the ducal residences Damm (now Szczecin-Dąbie), Köslin (now Koszalin), Stettin (now Szczecin) and Wolgast.

The capitulation also included restrictions on the army, in particular it forbade among others the interference with trade, traffic and crafts; holdups and robberies which would harm towns, burghers, peasants or travellers; looting and extortion; rape of decent women; (Note: The German original reads "Verbot von Notzucht und Schändung 'redlicher Weibsbilder'". Langer (2003), p. 404) quartering of soldiers' families and servants; and frivolous use of arms.

Contributions, which were to pay to the imperial forces by the duchy, were fixed at a weekly 407 Reichstalers per company and an additional 2,580 Reichstalers per respective staff.

== Implementation and consequences ==
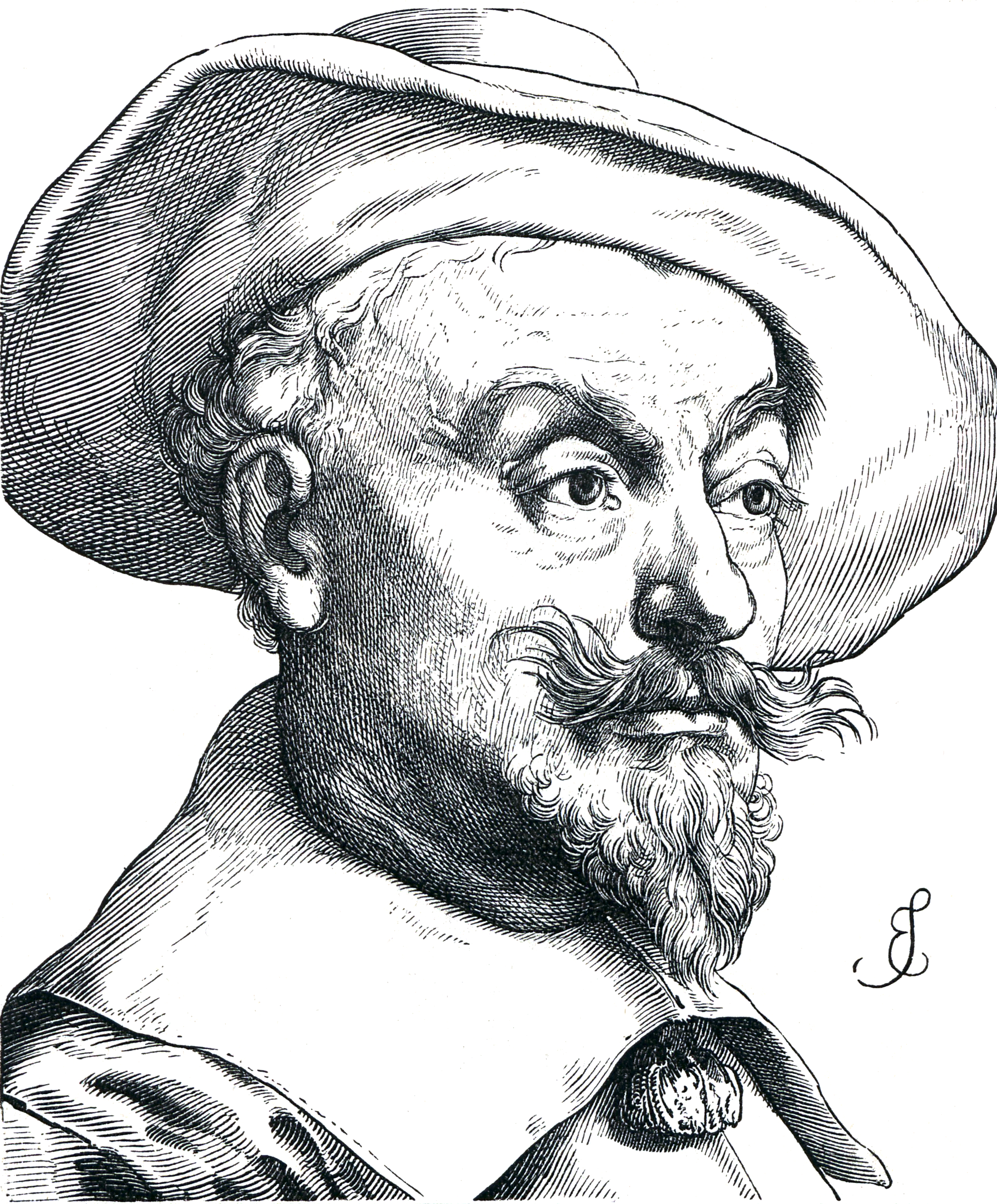
Albrecht von Wallenstein

The towns of Anklam, Demmin, Greifswald and Kolberg (now Kolobrzeg) were made seats of a garrison each, while in other towns, smaller units took quarter. Cavalry was stationed primarily in villages due to both the easier handling of the horses and the lower proportion of desertion compared to infantry.

Although not ruled out verbatim in the capitulation's text, the conditions of quartering in Pomerania followed established practice: House and estate owners were to provide the soldier with bed, vinegar and salt, and also share kitchen and heatable living room at no cost. In theory, food had to be paid for; the soldiers were to either compensate their hosts or buy their victuals in special depots set up by the military.

Wallenstein had promised Ferdinand II, Holy Roman Emperor, to fund his army himself. In practice, this meant that the army was fed and paid by contributions of the occupied territories and war loot. Since the higher ranks often kept the already small fraction of war loot and contributions thought to pay the lower ranks for themselves, the soldiers satisfied their needs at the expense of the local population instead (bellum se ipsum alet).

In addition to noncompliance with the capitulation's provisions by the military, hardship resulted from more frequent epidemics caused by the quartering, and by shrinking natural resources. By 7 May 1628, Pomerania had already paid 466,981 Reichstaler as contributions – twice as much as the whole Upper Saxon Circle’s annual output. Suffering in Pomerania was "undescribable and became proverbial". John George I, Elector of Saxony, who still perceived the Upper Saxon Circle his sphere of influence and anticipated imperial occupation of his thitherto spared electorate, sharply criticized Wallenstein’s practices, yet without result.

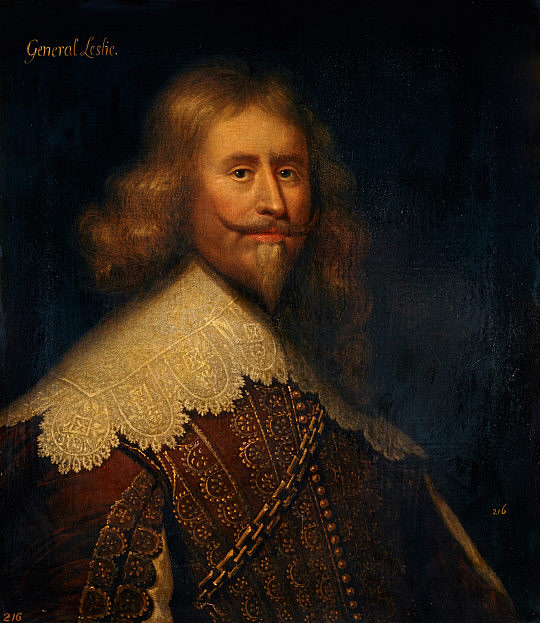
Alexander Leslie

Stralsund was the only town in the Duchy of Pomerania to resist imperial occupation, resulting in the Battle of Stralsund. Unwilling to surrender the considerable independence it had long enjoyed as a Hanseatic town, Stralsund ignored the duke's order to adhere to the capitulation, instead turned to Denmark and Sweden for support and was aided in her defense by both. Christian IV of Denmark deployed a Scottish force raised by Donald Mackay, and the Scots Alexander Seaton and Alexander Leslie were in charge of the defense when the former colonel, Holke, retired to seek reinforcements. (Note: Scotsman Seaton, in command of the Scottish-Danish forces, was relieved by Leslie, future Earl of Leven, a Scot in Swedish service. Salmon (2003), p. 32) Wallenstein laid siege to the town, and in July 1628 commanded several unsuccessful assaults in person. When Stralsund turned out to become his first serious misfortune in the war, he lifted the siege to win a last battle against Christian IV near Wolgast. Christian IV, who had already destroyed Wallenstein's naval facilities in Greifswald, had intended to secure another Pomeranian port besides Stralsund there, but was utterly defeated and retreated to Denmark. Stralsund however signed an alliance with Gustavus Adolphus of Sweden, providing him with a bridgehead on imperial territory manned with a Swedish expeditionary force and thus ultimately marking the Swedish entrance into the Thirty Years' War.

In February 1629, Bogislaw XIV pledged to ease the occupation, and though Ferdinand II re-assured the duke, he took no action. Instead the imperial Edict of Restitution of March advertised the re-Catholization of the empire’s Protestant states. The Treaty of Lübeck, which ended the hostilities between the Danish king and the emperor in May, likewise did not result in a relief or a lift of the occupation, even though the capitulation of Franzburg had been justified with the emperor's right to recruit military support from his subjects to their own and the empire's protection.

After France had mediated a truce between the Swedish Empire and the Polish–Lithuanian Commonwealth in September 1629, Sweden was ready for an invasion of the Holy Roman Empire. The invasion was started when Gustavus Adolphus' troops landed on Usedom island in the spring of 1630, while simultaneous assaults on Rügen and the adjacent mainland by the Stralsund garrison cleared his flank. As a consequence, the capitulation of Franzburg was replaced by a Pomeranian-Swedish alliance confirmed in the Treaty of Stettin.

== Legacy ==
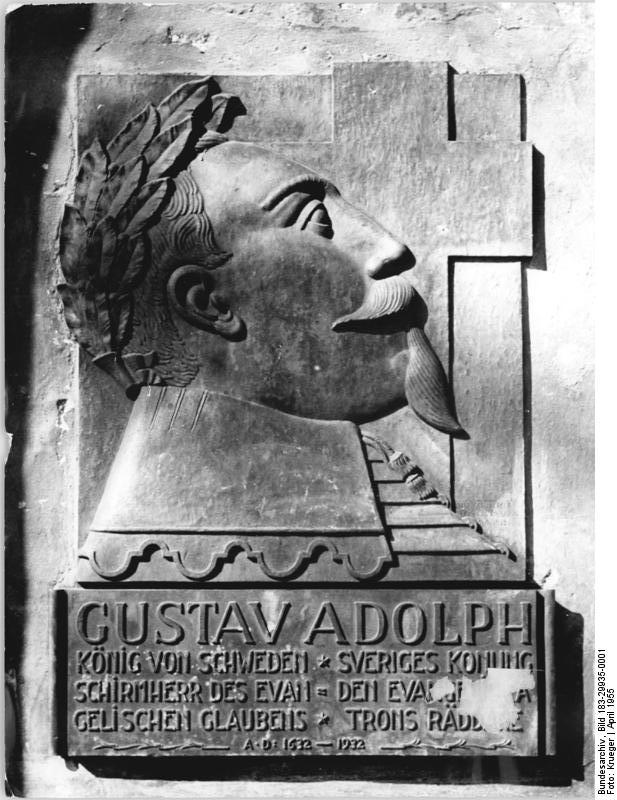
Gustavus Adolphus, memorial plaque at the Greifswald cathedral (Swedish Pomerania until 1815)

The capitulation of Franzburg marked the beginning of the Thirty Years' War in the Duchy of Pomerania. The severe plight the capitulation inflicted on the people only foreshadowed the utter devastation of the duchy by the end of the war, when two thirds of the population were left dead.

The successful resistance of Stralsund to the terms of the capitulation granted the Swedish Empire a foothold in the Holy Roman Empire – especially after Denmark withdrew her forces following the Treaty of Lübeck. The Swedish garrison in Stralsund was the first on German soil in history. A Riksdag commission had approved of Gustavus Adolphus' plans to intervene on the empire's soil already in the winter of 1627/28, and in January 1629, the Riksråd approved of an offensive war, put into effect in the following year. Swedish forces invaded Pomerania in 1630 and by 16 June 1631 had cleared the last imperial stronghold, Greifswald. With short war-caused interruptions, Sweden kept her continental foothold in what became known as Swedish Pomerania until the Congress of Vienna of 1815.

Bogislaw XIV, Duke of Pomerania, who had just part by part inherited the previously internally partitioned duchy to become her sole ruler in 1625, issued a paper called Dreijährige Drangsal ("three years of distress") after the Swedish take-over, which read that the capitulation in Franzburg had been forced upon him by the military. At the same time, he wrote a letter to the Holy Roman Emperor apologizing for the Swedish alliance, saying he had no choice but to obey Swedish demands, and included a passage in the Treaty of Stettin stating the alliance be for the empire's best. Bogislaw did not survive the war: He died without issue in 1637, terminating some 500 years of rulership of the House of Pomerania.

The town of Franzburg, where the capitulation was signed, fell victim to the war, too: It was devastated completely. In 1670, a mere 70 people lived in the town. Only in 1728 was Franzburg resettled.

== See also ==
- Pomerania during the Early Modern Age
- Thirty Years' War
- Battle of Stralsund (1628)
- Battle of Wolgast
- Duchy of Pomerania
- Swedish Pomerania

== Sources ==
=== Bibliography ===
- Beier, Brigitte (2007). Die Chronik der Deutschen (in German). wissenmedia. ISBN 978-3-577-14374-5.
- Buchholz, Werner, ed. (1999). Pommern (in German). Siedler. ISBN 3-88680-780-0.
- Dubilski, Petra (2003). Usedom (in German). DuMont. ISBN 3-7701-5978-0.
- Guthrie, William P. (2002). Battles of the Thirty Years War: from White Mountain to Nordlingen, 1618-1635. Greenwood Publishing Group. ISBN 0-313-32028-4.
- Heckel, Martin (1983). Deutschland im konfessionellen Zeitalter (in German). Vandenhoeck & Ruprecht. ISBN 3-525-33483-4.
- Heitz, Gerhard; Rischer, Henning (1995). Geschichte in Daten. Mecklenburg-Vorpommern (in German). Münster-Berlin: Koehler&Amelang. ISBN 3-7338-0195-4.
- Hildisch, Johannes (1980). Die Münzen der pommerschen Herzöge von 1569 bis zum Erlöschen des Greifengeschlechtes (in German). Böhlau. ISBN 3-412-04679-5.
- Hinz, Johannes (1994). Pommernlexikon (in German). Kraft. ISBN 3-8083-1164-9.
- Krause, Gerhard; Balz, Horst Robert (1993). Müller, Gerhard (ed.). Theologische Realenzyklopädie I (in German). De Gruyter. ISBN 3-11-013898-0.
- Krause, Gerhard; Balz, Horst Robert (1993). Müller, Gerhard (ed.). Theologische Realenzyklopädie II (in German). Walter de Gruyter. ISBN 3-11-016295-4.
- Krüger, Joachim (2006). Zwischen dem Reich und Schweden: die landesherrliche Münzprägung im Herzogtum Pommern und in Schwedisch-Pommern in der frühen Neuzeit (ca. 1580–1715) (in German). Berlin-Hamburg-Münster: LIT Verlag. ISBN 3-8258-9768-0.
- Lockhart, Paul Douglas (2007). Denmark, 1513-1660: the rise and decline of a Renaissance monarchy. Oxford University Press. ISBN 978-0-19-927121-4.
- Kohler, Alfred; Lutz, Heinrich (2002). Reformation und Gegenreformation (in German) (5 ed.). Oldenbourg Wissenschaftsverlag. ISBN 3-486-49585-2.
- Langer, Herbert (1998). "Heeresfinanzierung, Produktion und Märkte für die Kriegsführung". In Bußmann, Klaus; Schilling, Heinz (eds.). 1648: Krieg und Frieden in Europa. Münster/Osnabrück 24.10.1998-17.01.1999 [Katalog zur 26. Europaratsausstellung]. Katalogband und zwei Textbände [Ausstellungskatalog; Textband 1: Politik, Religion, Recht und Gesellschaft; Textband 2: Kunst und Kultur]. Band I (in German). Münster: LWL-Institut für Regionalgeschichte, Stiftung Westfalen-Initiative. Portal Westphälische Geschichte. pp. 293–299. ISBN 3-88789-127-9.
- Langer, Herbert (2003). "Die Anfänge des Garnisionswesens in Pommern". In Asmus, Ivo; Droste, Heiko; Olesen, Jens E. (eds.). Gemeinsame Bekannte: Schweden und Deutschland in der Frühen Neuzeit (in German). Berlin-Hamburg-Münster: LIT Verlag. ISBN 3-8258-7150-9.
- Mackillop, Andrew; Murdoch, Steve (2003). Military governors and imperial frontiers c. 1600-1800: A study of Scotland and empires. BRILL. ISBN 90-04-12970-7.
- Nicklas, Thomas (2002). Macht oder Recht: frühneuzeitliche Politik im Obersächsischen Reichskreis (in German). Franz Steiner Verlag. ISBN 3-515-07939-4.
- Porada, Haik Thomas (1997). Beiträge zur Geschichte Vorpommerns: die Demminer Kolloquien 1985-1994 (in German). Helms. ISBN 3-931185-11-7.
- Press, Volker (1991). Kriege und Krisen: Deutschland 1600-1715 (in German). C.H.Beck. ISBN 3-406-30817-1.
- Salmon, Patrick; Barrow, Tony (2003). Britain and the Baltic: Studies in commercial, political and cultural relations 1500-2000. University of Sunderland Press. ISBN 1-873757-49-2.
- Sturdy, David J. (2002). Fractured Europe, 1600-1721. Wiley-Blackwell. ISBN 0-631-20513-6.
