= Battle of Wolgast =

1628 battle of Thirty Years' War

Coordinates: 54°03′0″N 13°46′0″E

- Part of the Thirty Years' War
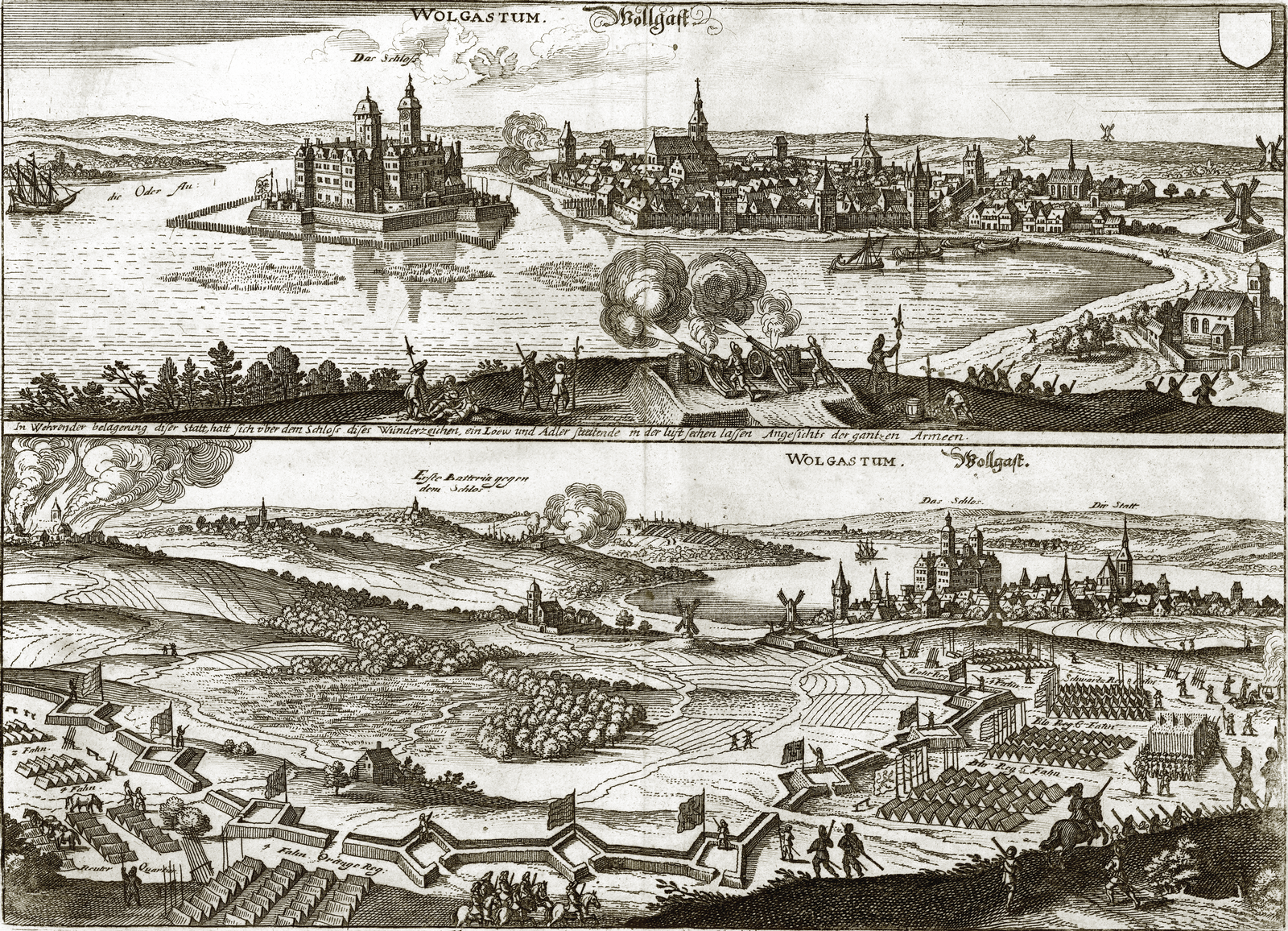
- Danish Siege of Wolgast
Date	2 September (N.S.) 1628
Location	Wolgast, Mecklenburg-Vorpommern, Germany
Result	Imperial victory

Belligerents
Denmark–Norway	Holy Roman Empire

Commanders and leaders
Christian IV; Donald Mackay	Wallenstein; Tiefenbach; Sparr; Baltasar Marradas; Heinrich Holk

Strength
5,000–6,000	7,000–8,000

Casualties and losses
1,000 killed, 1,100 captured	Unknown

The Battle of Wolgast took place on 2 September 1628 during the Thirty Years' War, outside Wolgast in Pomerania. An Imperial army under Albrecht von Wallenstein defeated a Danish expedition commanded by Christian IV of Denmark, and forced them to evacuate the town.

== Background ==
Danish intervention in the Thirty Years' War began when Christian IV invaded the Holy Roman Empire in 1625. Despite initial success, by late 1627 the Danish army had been forced back to the Baltic Sea by Imperial troops under Albrecht von Wallenstein. The Duchy of Pomerania, which included Wolgast, capitulated to the Empire at Franzburg in November 1627. The Baltic Sea, however, remained under Danish control, due to the lack of an imperial navy.

Emperor Ferdinand II gave Wallenstein the Duchy of Mecklenburg in January, and promoted him "General of the Oceanic and Baltic Seas" in April 1628. Together with Spain, Wallenstein made plans for a Baltic imperial navy. Denmark and Sweden reacted by concluding an alliance, also in April.

Key locations in text

Stralsund, some 70 kilometers west of Wolgast, refused to accept the Capitulation of Franzburg and with Danish and Swedish support successfully resisted Wallenstein's siege. In addition to the support for Stralsund, Christian IV had resorted to a strategy of amphibious ambushes, using his naval superiority to make landfalls on Fehmarn and in Eckernförde, and destroying the naval facilities in Ålborg, Greifswald, and Wismar - all in imperial hands.

== Battle ==
On 11 August, Christian IV of Denmark-Norway with 7,000 troops landed on Usedom, separated from the town of Wolgast by the Peenestrom sound, and occupied the island. At the mouth of the sound, the Imperial occupation forces since February had constructed a sconce at Peenemünde, which was taken by Christian IV's troops. (Note: The sconce would be taken by the Swedish landing forces in 1630, and thus is called Schwedenschanze- Swedish sconce. Sinnwell (2003), p.59)

On 14 August (O.S.)/24 August (N.S.), (Note: In the 17th century, the Julian calendar was used in the region, which then was ten days late compared to the Gregorian calendar: Danish take-over: 14 August - Julian, 24 August - Gregorian; Imperial take-over: 22 August - Julian, 2 September - Gregorian.) they took over Wolgast meeting no resistance. After the Imperial garrison was expelled, Christian IV was met by an overwhelming support of the local population to turn Wolgast into a fortress like Stralsund. Reinforcements were on their way from Sweden.

Christian IV then awaited Wallenstein, who withdrew from the siege of Stralsund and was heading east to face the Danish force. The battlefield Christian had chosen was half a mile west of the town, secured by the coast and marshes.

Christian IV had 5,000-6,000 troops on the battlefield, including 1,500 cavalry and some 400 Scots from the Donald Mackay regiment, and the infantry organized in six regiments. Wallenstein advanced with a force of 7,000-8,000 troops, consisting of 33 infantry companies, 20 cuirassier companies, and 11 guns.

Wallenstein attacked on 22 August (O.S.) / 2 September (N.S.). He wiped out the Danish flank, killing 1,000 of Christian IV's troops and capturing another 600. Thereafter, he was able to retake the town, where 500 Danish troops were now isolated from the main army and had no choice but to surrender. Thereby, Wolgast with its residence of the Pomeranian dukes was badly burned and looted. Only nightfall allowed for Christian IV and some of his troops to retreat and board their vessels.

== Aftermath ==
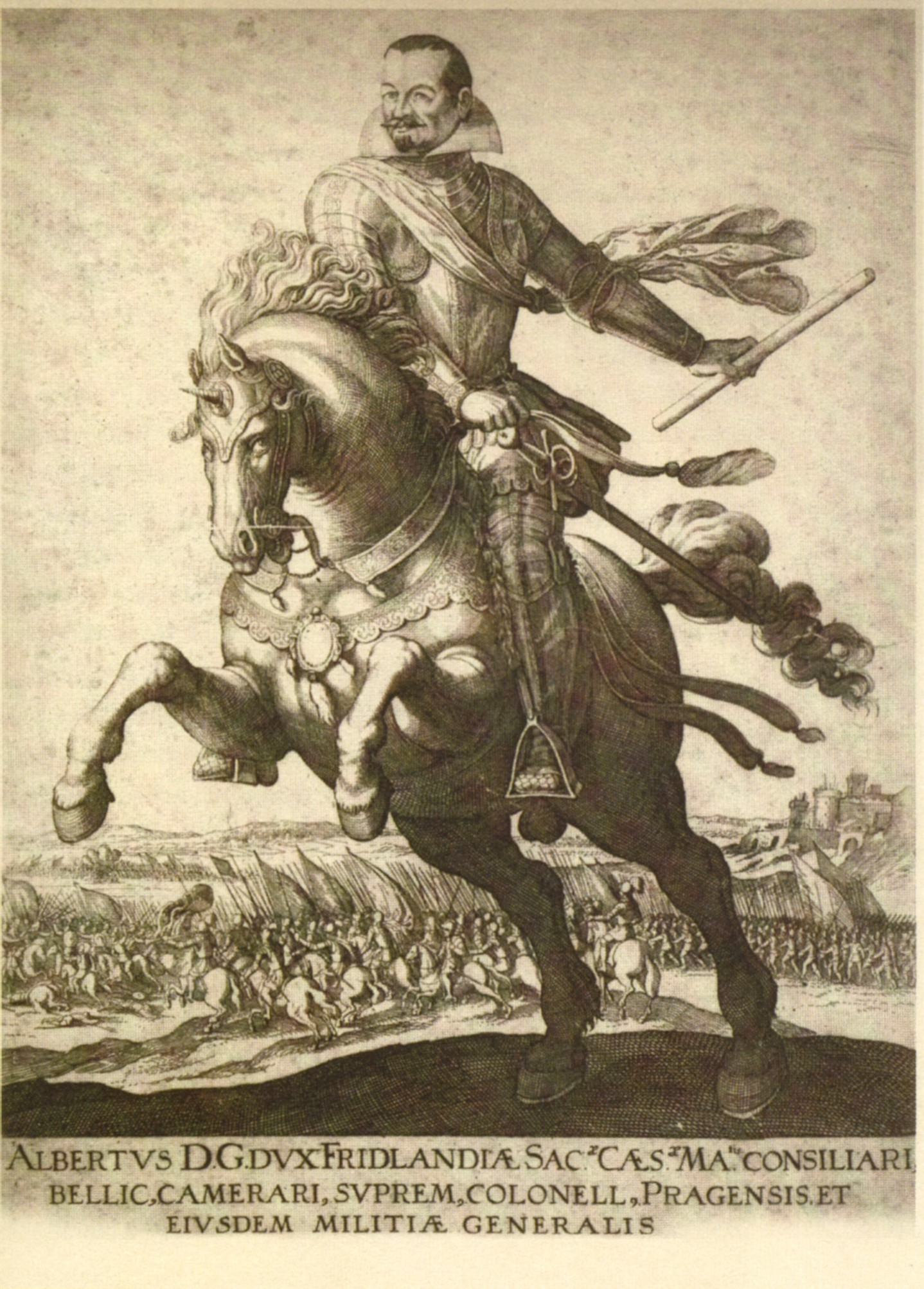
Albrecht von Wallenstein on horseback

=== Analysis ===
The battle was the last one between Christian IV and the Holy Roman Empire. The defeat at Wolgast, ending the most ambitious operation of the Danish 1628 amphibious assault series, was the decisive factor that led Christian IV to negotiate the Peace of Lübeck with Ferdinand II, Holy Roman Emperor. On the other hand, Wallenstein also needed a peace: The campaigns of Christian IV succeeded to keep Imperial forces busy that were needed elsewhere, and with respect to Denmark, this was a major intent behind the assaults. Furthermore, the Dano-Swedish alliance that took shape was a threat to Wallenstein's North German gains.

After Albrecht von Wallenstein had lost much of his reputation in the Siege of Stralsund, the victory at Wolgast postponed his dismissal. Though Ferdinand II had Ramboldo, Count of Collalto, reduce Wallenstein's army, the passage about his dismissal was stricken out.

=== Peace of Lübeck ===
The Peace of Lübeck essentially returned to Christian IV his pre-war possessions, while he had to pledge not to intervene in the empire again.

=== Sweden invades Pomerania ===
In 1630, Gustavus Adolphus of Sweden started the Swedish invasion of the Holy Roman Empire, landing on Usedom near Wolgast - in the same spot as Christian IV did before. The Imperial defenders of Wolgast, in charge since the battle of 1628, were defeated on 7 August 1630 in the town, and on 25 August in the castle of Wolgast. While his success was longer lasting, he would return to Wolgast on 15 July 1633 in a casket, when his body was embarked for the final transfer to Sweden.

== Sources ==
- Albrecht, Dieter (1998). Maximilian I. von Bayern 1573-1651 (in German). Oldenbourg Wissenschaftsverlag. ISBN 3-486-56334-3.
- Bedürftig, Friedemann (1998). Taschenlexikon Dreissigjähriger Krieg (in German). Piper. ISBN 3-492-22668-X.
- Beller, E. A. (October 1928). "The Military Expedition of Sir Charles Morgan to Germany, 1627-9". The English Historical Review. 43 (172): 528–539. doi:10.1093/ehr/xliii.clxxii.528.
- Döblin, Alfred (2001). Kobel, Erwin (ed.). Wallenstein (in German). Walter. ISBN 3-530-16714-2.
- Ehrle, Peter Michael; Greflinger, Georg (1983). Der Deutschen Dreyssig-Jähriger Krieg 1657. Kommentiert und mit einem Nachwort von Peter Michael Ehrle (in German). Wilhelm Fink. ISBN 3-7705-2126-9.
- Findeisen, Jörg-Peter (1998). Der Dreissigjährige Krieg: eine Epoche in Lebensbildern (in German). Styria. ISBN 3-222-12643-7.
- Gebhardt, Bruno; Häfele, Rolf, eds. (2001). Handbuch der deutschen Geschichte (in German) (10 ed.). Klett-Cotta.
- Guthrie, William P. (2002). Battles of the Thirty Years War: from White Mountain to Nordlingen, 1618-1635. Greenwood Publishing Group. ISBN 0-313-32028-4.
- Heitz, Gerhard; Rischer, Henning (1995). Geschichte in Daten. Mecklenburg-Vorpommern (in German). Münster-Berlin: Koehler&Amelang. ISBN 3-7338-0195-4.
- Heckel, Martin (1983). Deutschland im konfessionellen Zeitalter (in German). Vandenhoeck & Ruprecht. ISBN 3-525-33483-4.
- Langer, Herbert (2003). "Die Anfänge des Garnisionswesens in Pommern". In Asmus, Ivo; Droste, Heiko; Olesen, Jens E. (eds.). Gemeinsame Bekannte: Schweden und Deutschland in der Frühen Neuzeit (in German). Berlin-Hamburg-Münster: LIT Verlag. ISBN 3-8258-7150-9.
- Lee, Stephen J (2002). The Thirty Years War. Routledge. ISBN 0-415-26862-1.
- Lockhart, Paul Douglas (2007). Denmark, 1513-1660: the rise and decline of a Renaissance monarchy. Oxford University Press. ISBN 978-0-19-927121-4.
- Mackillop, Andrew; Murdoch, Steve (2003). Military governors and imperial frontiers c. 1600-1800: A study of Scotland and empires. BRILL. ISBN 90-04-12970-7.
- Press, Volker (1991). Kriege und Krisen: Deutschland 1600-1715 (in German). C.H.Beck. ISBN 3-406-30817-1.
- Sinnwell, Armin; Riedel, Glenn, eds. (2003). Bertelsmann, der grosse Deutschland-Atlas (in German). Lexikoninstitut Bertelsmann (Gütersloh), Wissen Media Verlag (Ostfildern). ISBN 3-577-13531-X.
- Wartenberg, Heiko (2008). Archivführer zur Geschichte Pommerns bis 1945 (in German). Oldenbourg Wissenschaftsverlag. ISBN 978-3-486-58540-7.
