= Treaty of Lübeck =

1629 peace treaty during the Thirty Years' War

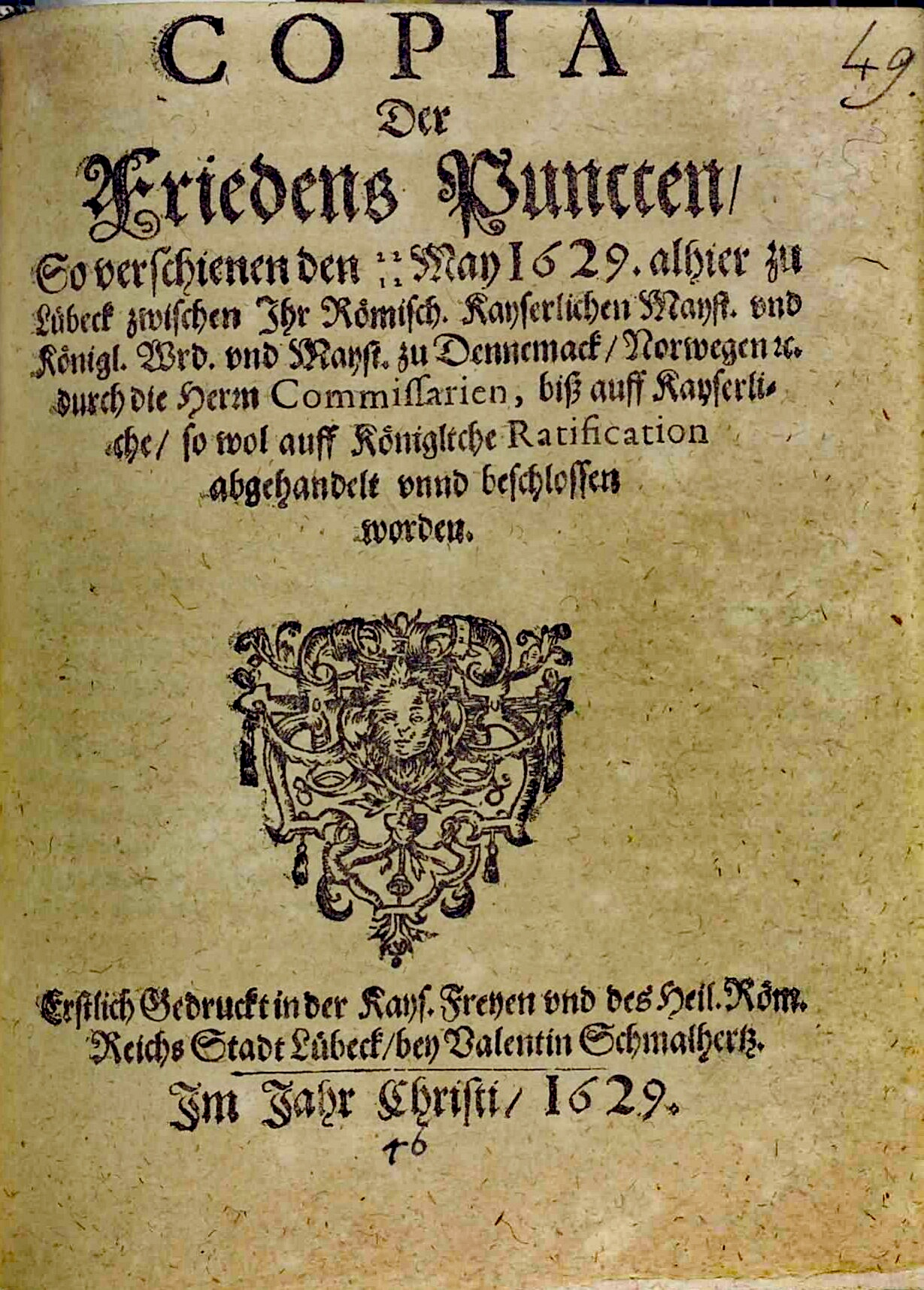
- Cover of a print-copy. The double date (12/22 May) is due to different calendars used then: 12 May is in the Julian calendar (used by the Protestant parties at the time), and 22 May is in the Gregorian calendar (used by the Catholic parties at the time).
- Type: Peace treaty
- Context: Thirty Years' War
- Signed: 22 May and 7 June 1629
- Location: Lübeck
- Signatories: Albrecht von Wallenstein; Christian IV of Denmark; Ferdinand II, Holy Roman Emperor
- Parties: Denmark–Norway; Holy Roman Empire
- Language: German

The Treaty or Peace of Lübeck (Danish: Freden i Lübeck, German: Lübecker Frieden) ended the Danish intervention in the Thirty Years' War (Low Saxon or Emperor's War, Kejserkrigen). It was signed in Lübeck on 22 May 1629 by Albrecht von Wallenstein and Christian IV of Denmark-Norway, and on 7 June by Ferdinand II, Holy Roman Emperor. The Catholic League was formally included as a party. It restored to Denmark–Norway its pre-war territory at the cost of final disengagement from imperial affairs.

== Background ==
The treaty of Lübeck ended a stage of the Thirty Years' War referred to as the Lower Saxon or Emperor's War (Danish: Kejserkrigen), which had begun in 1625. Initial success was with the Danish armies, commanded by Christian IV of Denmark and Ernst von Mansfeld. Then, in 1626, their opponents, a Catholic League army commanded by Johann Tserclaes, Count of Tilly, and an army of Ferdinand II, Holy Roman Emperor, commanded by Albrecht von Wallenstein, turned the tide in the battles of Dessau Bridge and Lutter am Barenberge. Mansfeld moved his army toward Silesia and Hungary, but that campaign failed in 1627, and Mansfeld deserted and later died of plague.

Wallenstein and Tilly subsequently gained central and northern Germany, joined their forces during the summer of 1627, invaded Danish Holstein in September, and advanced through the Jutland peninsula as far as Limfjord. While Christian IV's control of the western Baltic Sea and the Danish isles was unchallenged, Wallenstein was given the Duchy of Mecklenburg vis-a-vis Denmark in January 1628, and was preparing to construct a navy of his own at the occupied ports of Ålborg, Wismar, Rostock, and Greifswald starting in late 1627.

Christian responded with an amphibious campaign in 1628, using his fleet to make landfalls along the occupied coastlines, and destroying the naval facilities in Ålborg, Wismar, and Greifswald. Wallenstein, who had nevertheless managed to build thirteen vessels in Wismar under Philipp von Mansfeld, was unable to use them, because Swedish ships were blockading that port. Christian concluded an alliance with Gustavus Adolphus of Sweden in April, and both supported Stralsund in her successful resistance against Wallenstein. In August, an attempt to secure another bridgehead on the southern Baltic shore failed with Christian's defeat in the Battle of Wolgast. After this battle, the final one in the Kejserkrigen, Christian was ready to negotiate—and so was Wallenstein, whom the Scandinavian alliance seriously threatened.

== Negotiations ==
In September 1627, Tilly and Wallenstein had drafted a peace proposal for the Catholic League and the Holy Roman Emperor. The proposal had Christian:

- surrender all imperial offices,
- surrender his bishoprics in the Lower Saxon Circle,
- buy out his provinces of Holstein, Schleswig, and Jutland from the imperial occupation forces for two million Reichstaler each,
- cede either Glückstadt or Holstein to Ferdinand II, Holy Roman Emperor.

While the Danish rigsraadet accepted the proposal as a basis for negotiations, this was rejected by Christian. While the Catholic League pressed the emperor to continue the war, and Christian was urged likewise by England and the Netherlands, both sent their emissaries to Lübeck for negotiations in January 1629. The emperor had Wallenstein negotiate for him, and Christian had sent entrusted delegates whom he had selected bypassing his rigsraadet. Initially, both sides proposed diametrical peace terms:

Conditions for a peace proposed in January 1629
Wallenstein's terms	Danish delegates' terms
Christian is to: compensate the emperor for his expenses in the Kejserkrigen, cede Jutland and his duchies in the empire, not interfere with the empire ever again.	Ferdinand II is to: restore to Christian all occupied provinces, compensate the states of the Lower Saxon Circle for their losses during the occupation, issue guarantees to the Lower Saxon states concerning their religious and political freedom.

Christian IV's position was somewhat strengthened by his military successes in 1628, but more so by Wallenstein's fear of a Danish-Swedish alliance. Bagging that fear, Christian personally met with Gustavus Adolphus of Sweden in February 1629, at Ulvsbäck. Gustavus Adolphus proposed a joint invasion of the empire, either from Stralsund or from Glückstadt, yet under the premise that overall command was with him, and that the invasion force would consist of more Swedish than Danish forces. Christian refused.

Both Christian and Wallenstein were aware that neither of them would be able to get all their demands through, thus they resorted to secret negotiations in Güstrow, Mecklenburg.

== Treaty ==
The treaty was concluded by Wallenstein and Christian on 22 May 1629, and ratified by Ferdinand on 7 June. The Catholic League was formally added as a party. The treaty restored to Christian his pre-war possessions, and obliged him to cede his claims to Lower Saxon bishoprics, to discontinue his alliances with the North German states, and to not interfere with further imperial affairs in the future.

Tilly had not succeeded in implementing a compensation of the imperial war costs on Christian. Also not included in the treaty's text was that Christian stop supporting Frederick V, Elector Palatine, as demanded by Maximilian I, Elector of Bavaria.

== Consequences ==
The treaty marked a turning point in Denmark–Norway's status, which was subsequently reduced from that of a major European power to a politically insignificant state. The new Nordic power would be Sweden, who was to turn the tide of the Thirty Years' War after its forces landed in Pomerania in 1630, and, starting with the Torstenson War, subsequently deprived Denmark of her trans-Kattegat provinces, and Norway lost the provinces Jämtland and Härjedalen.

The treaty further divided Christian and the Rigsraadet, for Christian argued that if the latter had been in charge, it would have accepted the initial imperial territorial and financial demands.

Ferdinand had hoped for more favourable terms, and was surprised and disappointed of what Wallenstein had negotiated. While he had arranged for imposing his war costs on Christian, this was no longer an option.

Deprived of Danish-Norwegian protection, the North German states faced the Edict of Restitution, issued by Ferdinand already during the negotiations. It aimed at a re-Catholization of northern Germany, and the restitution of former ecclesial possessions that had been secularized during the Protestant Reformation.

== See also ==
- History of Denmark
- History of Norway
- List of treaties

== Sources ==
=== Bibliography ===
- Albrecht, Dieter (1998). Maximilian I. von Bayern 1573–1651 (in German). Oldenbourg Wissenschaftsverlag. ISBN 3-486-56334-3.
- Fuhrmann, Kai (2002). Die Ritterschaft als politische Korporation in den Herzogtümern Schleswig und Holstein von 1460 bis 1721 (in German). Kiel: Verlag Ludwig. ISBN 3-933598-39-7.
- Heckel, Martin (1983). Deutschland im konfessionellen Zeitalter (in German). Vandenhoeck & Ruprecht. ISBN 3-525-33483-4.
- Lockhart, Paul Douglas (2007). Denmark, 1513-1660: the rise and decline of a Renaissance monarchy. Oxford University Press. ISBN 978-0-19-927121-4.
- Oakley, Stewart P. (1992). War and peace in the Baltic, 1560-1790. Routledge. ISBN 0-415-02472-2.
- Kohler, Alfred (1990). Das Reich im Kampf um die Hegemonie in Europa 1521-1648 (in German). Oldenbourg Wissenschaftsverlag. ISBN 3-486-55461-1.
- Press, Volker (1991). Kriege und Krisen: Deutschland 1600-1715 (in German). C.H.Beck. ISBN 3-406-30817-1.
- Schormann, Gerhard (1985). Der Dreissigjährige Krieg (in German) (2 ed.). Vandenhoeck & Ruprecht. ISBN 3-525-33506-7.
