= Alexander Seaton =

Alexander Seaton or Seton (before 1626 – after 1649) was a Scottish soldier in Danish service during the Thirty Years' War. He briefly served as a governor in the Battle of Stralsund and as an admiral in the Torstenson War.

== Biography ==
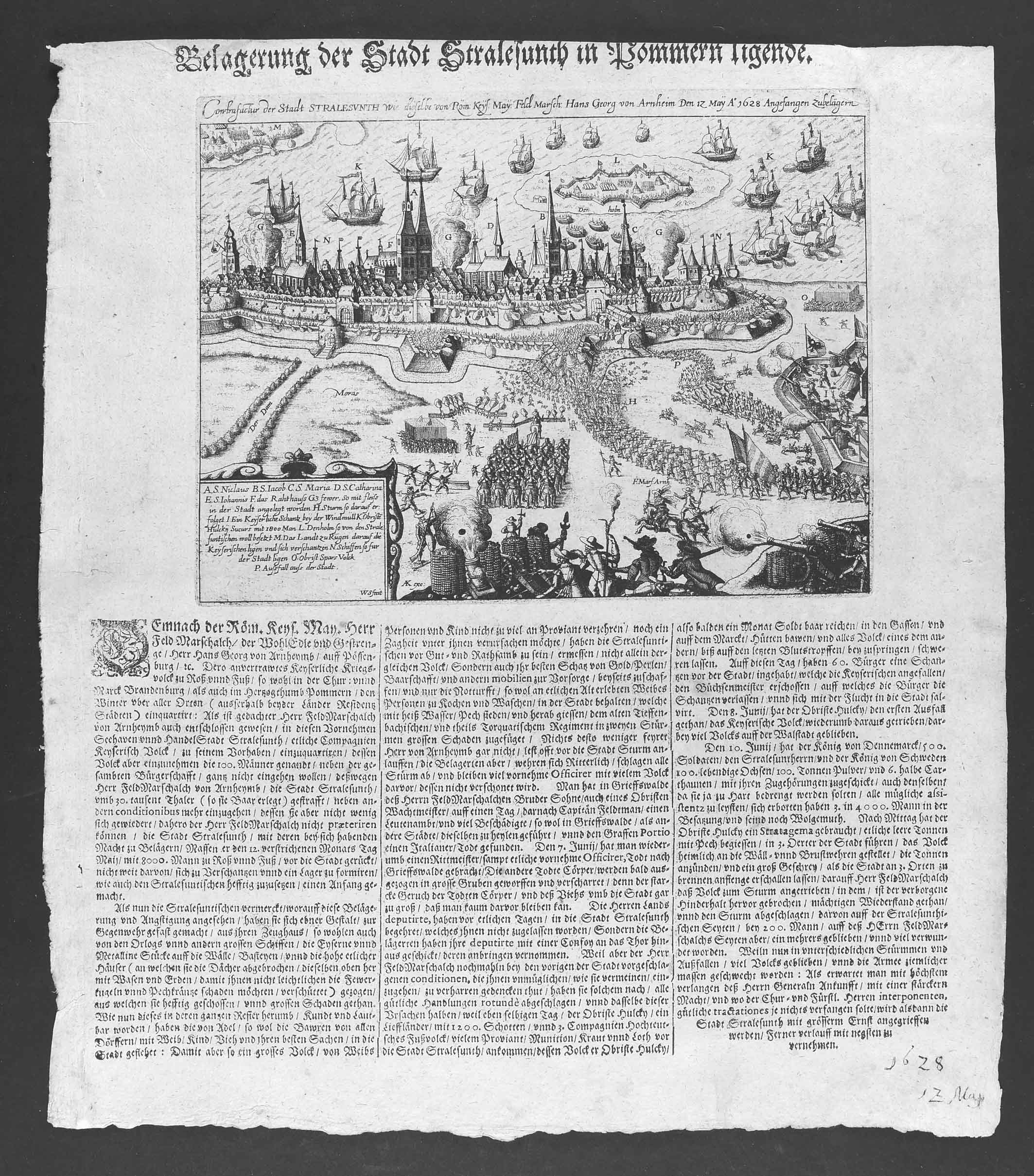
Contemporary broadsheet describing the Battle of Stralsund (1628). Seaton was the defending governor in June and in July. The leaflet was drawn during the battle, when Seaton's predecessor Heinrich Holk ("Obrist Holky") was still in command, but mentions the arrival of Seaton's regiment ("1,200 Schotten").

Neither the place nor the date of Alexander Seaton's birth are recorded. Though his parents remain unknown, it has been proposed that either Alexander Seton of Lathrisk or George Seton of Cariston be his father.

Alexander Seaton entered the service of Christian IV of Denmark, and advanced to the rank of a captain of infantry on 8 April 1626. Upon request by the Danish king, the Scottish Privy Council allowed Seaton to levy 500 Scottish soldiers on 30 June.

On 28 February 1627, he advanced to the rank of a lieutenant colonel. In September, he was wounded in battle near Oldenburg, while securing Bernhard of Saxe-Weimar's rear against Johann Tserclaes, Count of Tilly's forces during the Battle of Heiligenhafen. (Note: The battle took place between 23 and 27 September. A Danish force of 6,000 troops, commanded by Baden, Mitzlaff and Bernhard of Saxe-Weimar, landed at Heiligenhafen and was intercepted by imperial forces commanded by Schlick. Of the Danish troops, 1,000 were killed and 4,000 surrendered, only 1,000 succeeded in boarding vessels and escape with Saxe-Weimar. Among these were the surviving Scots. Guthrie (2002), p.143: "Action of Heiligenhofen [sic!]".)

He moved his company to Stralsund where they joined other Scots of Donald Mackay's regiment during the Battle of Stralsund (1628), where he served as lieutenant colonel. He succeeded the Danish-German mercenary Heinrich Holk as Stralsund's governor. During the time he was in command, the town withstood the siege of Albrecht von Wallenstein's imperial army. He was succeeded as the governor in July by Alexander Leslie, a Scot in Swedish service who arrived with a contingent of Scots, Swedes and Germans. Wallenstein lifted the siege on 4 August, forced to accept his first check in the Thirty Years' War.

Seaton did not stay with his regiment when it entered Swedish service, and instead joined the Norwegian infantry as a captain in 1628 - having left Mackay's troops as a lieutenant colonel. For the next 17 years, no records of Seaton's life are known.

By 1645, he had advanced to the rank of a colonel in the Norwegian army and navy again. In 1645, Seaton took over eight ships of the Danish navy to fight Sweden as an admiral - the last appointment of a British in Christian IV's service. With these ships, he took part in the "Norwegian response" by attacking Gothenburg (Göteborg) from the sea. Seaton's assault took place in August, just before the Treaty of Brömsebro ended the Danish-Swedish war in favour of Sweden on 13/23 August 1645. (Note: In the 17th century, the Julian calendar was used in the region, which then was ten days late compared to the Gregorian calendar; 13 August - Julian, 23 August - Gregorian.)

The last record of Seaton is of 19 April 1649, when he was a colonel in the Norwegian army. Date and place of Seaton's death are unknown, marriages are not recorded.

== See also ==
- Thirty Years' War
- Battle of Stralsund (1628)
- Alexander Leslie, 1st Earl of Leven
- Torstenson War
- Scotland and the Thirty Years' War

== Sources ==
=== Bibliography ===
- Engels, Wilhelm; Salm, Hubert, eds. (2001). Die kaiserlichen Korrespondenzen: 1646 (in German) (4 ed.). Aschendorff. ISBN 978-3-402-04988-4.
- Heckel, Martin (1983). Deutschland im konfessionellen Zeitalter (in German). Vandenhoeck & Ruprecht. ISBN 978-3-525-33483-6.
- Heitz, Gerhard; Rischer, Henning (1995). Geschichte in Daten. Mecklenburg-Vorpommern (in German). Münster-Berlin: Koehler&Amelang. ISBN 978-3-7338-0195-3.
- Krause, Gerhard; Balz, Horst Robert (1993). Müller, Gerhard (ed.). Theologische Realenzyklopädie I (in German). De Gruyter. ISBN 978-3-11-013898-6.
- Guthrie, William P. (2002). Battles of the Thirty Years War: from White Mountain to Nordlingen, 1618-1635. Greenwood Publishing Group. ISBN 978-0-313-32028-6.
- Mackillop, Andrew; Murdoch, Steve (2003). Military governors and imperial frontiers c. 1600-1800: A study of Scotland and empires. BRILL. ISBN 978-90-04-12970-2.
- Murdoch, Steve (2000). Britain, Denmark-Norway and the House of Stuart, 1603-1660: A diplomatic and military analysis. Tuckwell Press. ISBN 978-1-86232-182-3.
- Steve Murdoch and Alexia Grosjean, Alexander Leslie and the Scottish Generals of the Thirty Years' War, 1618-1648 (London, 2014)
