= Siege of Stralsund (1628) =

1628 siege during the Thirty Years' War

Coordinates: 54°18′0″N 13°5′0″E

- Part of Thirty Years' War
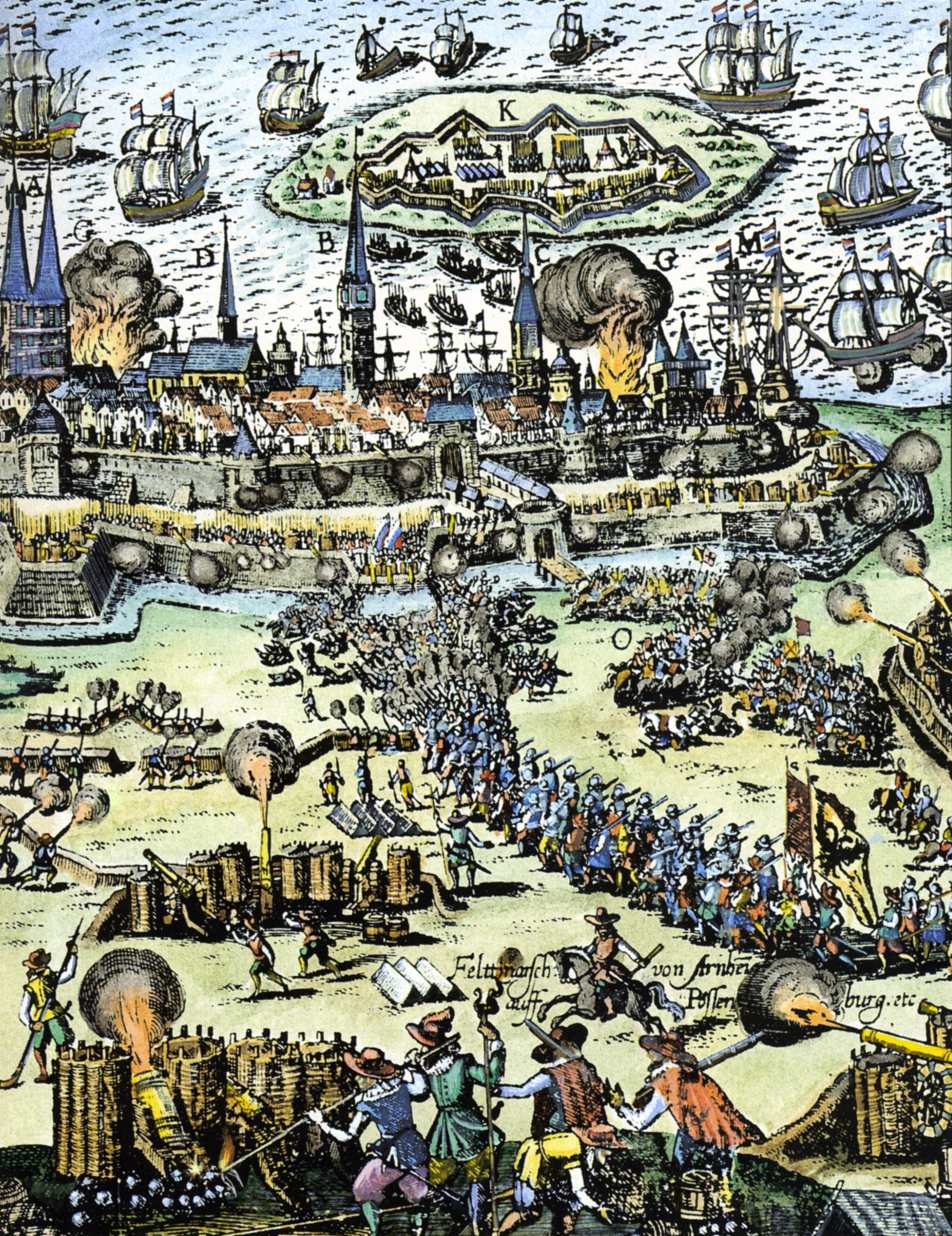
- Siege of Stralsund from contemporary engraving
Date	May to 4 August 1628
Location	Stralsund, Mecklenburg-Vorpommern, Germany
Result	Swedish victory

Belligerents
Denmark–Norway (Note: After the Siege the surviving Scots reenlisted in the Swedish Army); (yes) Swedish Empire; Hanseatic City of Stralsund	Holy Roman Empire

Commanders and leaders
(Denmark–Norway) Heinrich Holk; (Denmark–Norway) Alexander Seaton (Note: All the Scottish regiments in Danish service refused to fight under Danish flag and insisted on the Saltire. Monro mentions this in the opening pages of his memoir and the compromise as reached that a Saltire would be flown with a Dannerbrog in the top right corner.); (Denmark–Norway) Alexander Lindsay (commanding Mackay's); (Kingdom of Scotland) (Swedish Empire) Robert Munro (Kingdom of Scotland) (Swedish Empire) Alexander Leslie (Note: Leslie's Swedes were actually mostly Scottish volunteers who desired to help their countrymen.)	(Holy Roman Empire) Albrecht von Wallenstein (Holy Roman Empire) Hans Georg von Arnim

The Siege of Stralsund, 13 May to 4 August 1628, took place during the Thirty Years' War when an Imperial Army under Albrecht von Wallenstein attempted to capture the key Baltic Sea port of Stralsund. Then an independent city and part of the Hanseatic League, Stralsund was initially reinforced by small numbers of Scots mercenaries in Danish service, before Gustavus Adolphus of Sweden sent a larger force under Alexander Leslie.

The failure of the siege ended Wallenstein's series of victories, while Stralsund was held by the Swedes for most of the next two hundred years. It provided Gustavus a bridgehead within the Holy Roman Empire that in 1630 facilitated Swedish intervention in the Thirty Years' War.

== Background ==
Christian IV of Denmark invaded the Holy Roman Empire in 1625, hoping to expand his possessions, but instead suffered a series of defeats by Imperial forces under Albrecht von Wallenstein. The November 1627 Capitulation of Franzburg required all ports in the Duchy of Pomerania to submit to occupation by Imperial troops. Stralsund, a key Baltic Sea port and member of the Hanseatic League, refused to do so, asking for help first from Denmark and then Sweden.

== Siege ==
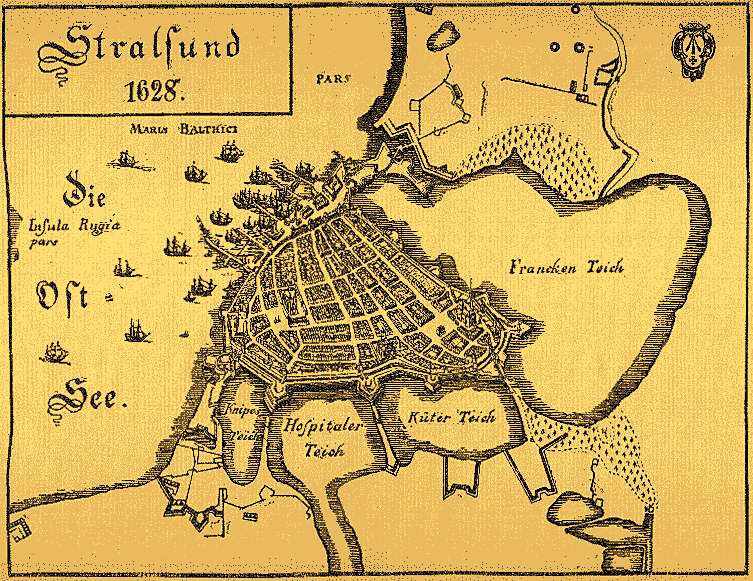
Map of Stralsund

Imperial forces commanded by Hans Georg von Arnim opened the siege in May 1628. The Danes sent reinforcements including 900 Scots led by Donald Mackay, with another 600 Swedes arriving on 20 June. On 23 June, Stralsund concluded an alliance with Gustavus Adolphus of Sweden, scheduled to last twenty years. Gustavus Adolphus then stationed a garrison in the town, the first such on German soil in history. This event marked the starting point of Swedish engagement in the Thirty Years' War.

On 27 June, Wallenstein took command of the besieging forces, and renewed the assaults starting the very same night. The Scottish troops, entrusted with the defence of a crucial section of Stralsund's fortifications, distinguished themselves by an extremely fierce way of fighting. The main assault was on the eastern district of Franken, commanded by major Robert Monro. Of 900 Scots, 500 were killed and 300 wounded, including Monro. Rosladin was able to relieve Monro's force and re-take lost ground. An overall 2,000 defenders were killed and captured in this assault. Monro later recalled that "we were not suffered to come off our posts for our ordinary recreation, nor yet to sleepe" - for a period of six weeks.

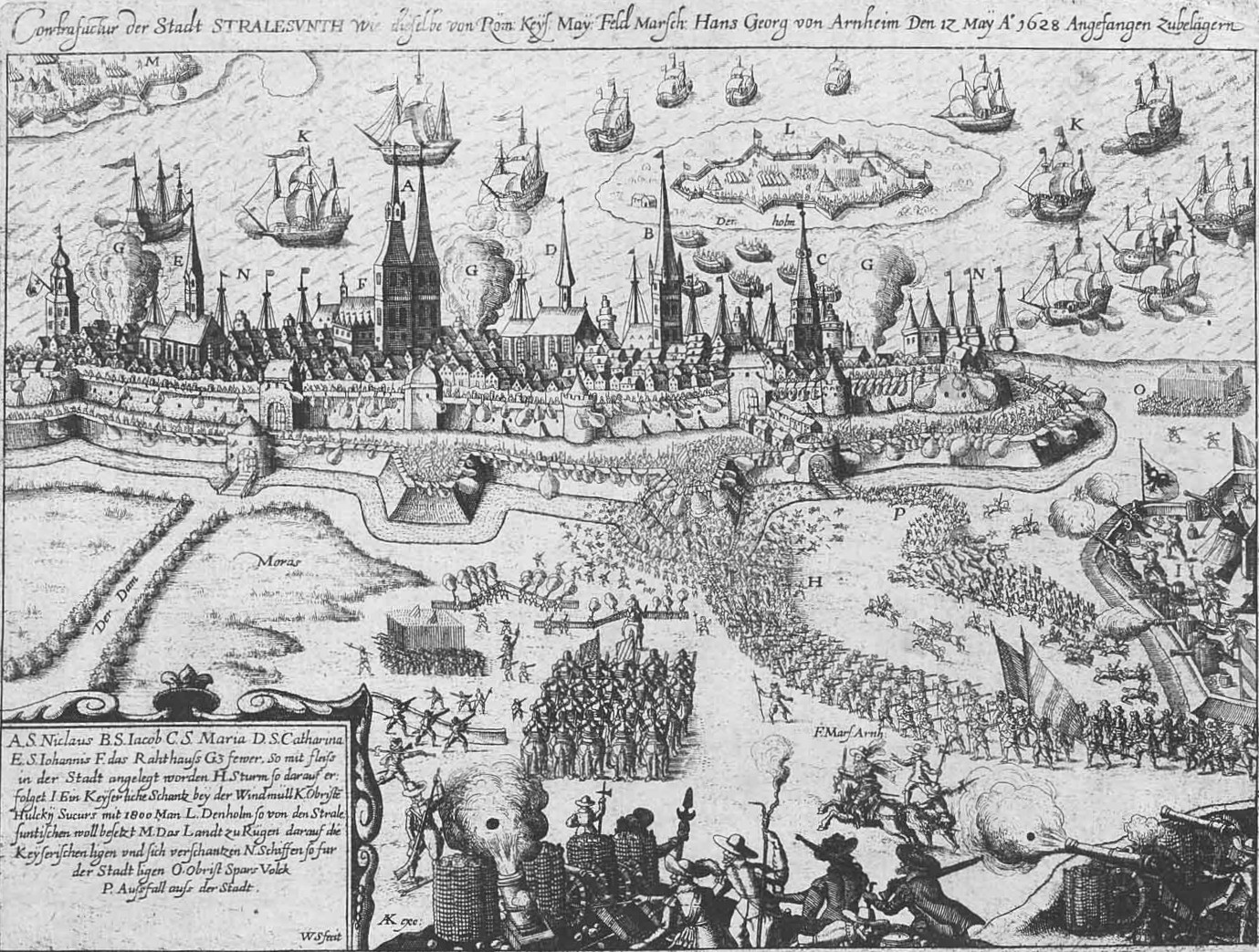
The siege, contemporary engraving.

The following night, on 28 and 29 June, Wallenstein succeeded in taking the outer works of the fortifications. Rosladin was wounded and governor Seaton took over his command.

On 29 June, Bogislaw XIV, Duke of Pomerania sent two of his high-ranking nobles, the count von Putbus and his chancellor von Horn, to persuade Stralsund to adhere to the Capitulation of Franzburg and surrender to Wallenstein. On 30 June, Rosladin persuaded the city not to enter into negotiations with Wallenstein, who had resorted to bombardment again. The same day, ten Swedish vessels reinforced Stralsund with 600 troops, while under heavy fire by Wallenstein's forces. Soon after, Christian ordered another Scottish regiment, that of Alexander Lindsay, 2nd Lord Spynie, to help with the defence of the town. These troops arrived around 4 July and suffered huge casualties (being reduced from a regiment to four companies) in the ensuing assaults, many led by Wallenstein in person. On 10 July, Wallenstein and Stralsund negotiated a treaty in the Hainholz woods northwest of the town, (Note: contemporary map snippets showing Hainholz forest) requiring Stralsund to take in Pomeranian troops. The treaty was signed by Wallenstein and Bogislaw XIV on 21 July, but not by Stralsund. Though Bogislaw vouched for the town, the treaty did not come into effect.

Already on 2 July, Stralsund had been reinforced by 400 Danish troops, and by 1,100 troops of the Danish-Scottish regiments of Donald Mackay and Alexander Lindsay, 2nd Lord Spynie in the following week. By the 17 July Scotsman Alexander Leslie, arrived with 1,100 troops, including more Scottish volunteers, and succeeded Seaton as Stralsund's governor. Leslie commanded a total of 4,000 to 5,000 troops. The Danish support amounted to 2,650 troops deployed during the siege. One of Leslie's first actions was an audacious all-out assault on the besieging troops which Robert Monro described as follows:

Sir Alexander Leslie being made governour, he resolved for the credit of his countrymen to make an out-fall upon the Enemy, and desirous to conferre the credit on his own Nation alone, being his first Essay in that Citie

Heavy rainfall between 21 and 24 July turned the battlefield into a marsh. On 4 August, Wallenstein lifted the siege, acknowledging his first misfortune in the Thirty Years' War.

== Aftermath ==
After the unsuccessful siege, Wallenstein headed to nearby Wolgast, to fight a final battle with Christian IV: Danish troops had landed in the area and occupied the island of Usedom, and had taken the town of Wolgast on 14 August without fighting. On 22 August, Wallenstein retook the town.

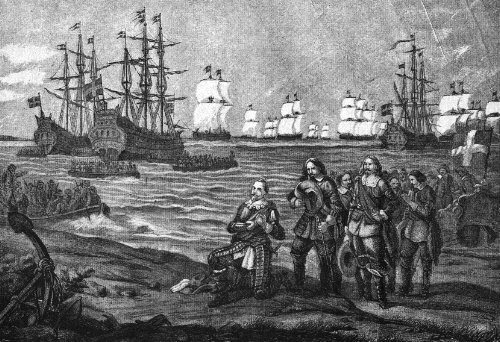
Gustavus Adolphus' landing in Pomerania, 1630

Also in August, Swedish chancellor Axel Oxenstierna came to Stralsund, and offered negotiations to Wallenstein. The latter however refused. The inability to take Stralsund was to become one of the obstacles which led to Wallenstein's temporary dismissal in 1630.

When Gustavus Adolphus' invaded Pomerania in June 1630, he used his bridgehead in Stralsund to clear the flanks of his landing forces. Bogislaw XIV concluded an alliance with the Swedish king in the Treaty of Stettin in July. Wallenstein's forces were subsequently driven out of the Duchy of Pomerania, and Swedish forces had taken complete control of the duchy when Wallenstein's forces in Greifswald surrendered in June 1631.

During the Swedish campaign, Alexander Leslie was succeeded as the governor of Stralsund by another Scot in Swedish service, James MacDougal, in 1630. From 1679 to 1697, the position was to pass to yet another Scot, Peter Maclean.

Part of Wallenstein's forces were infected with the Black Death. During the siege, the epidemics swept into the town, killing 2,000 in the months of August and September alone.

The battle of Stralsund entered Pomeranian folklore. The population of Stralsund commemorates the siege of 1628 with an annual festival, "Wallensteintage" ("Wallenstein Days").

== Gallery ==
Besieger

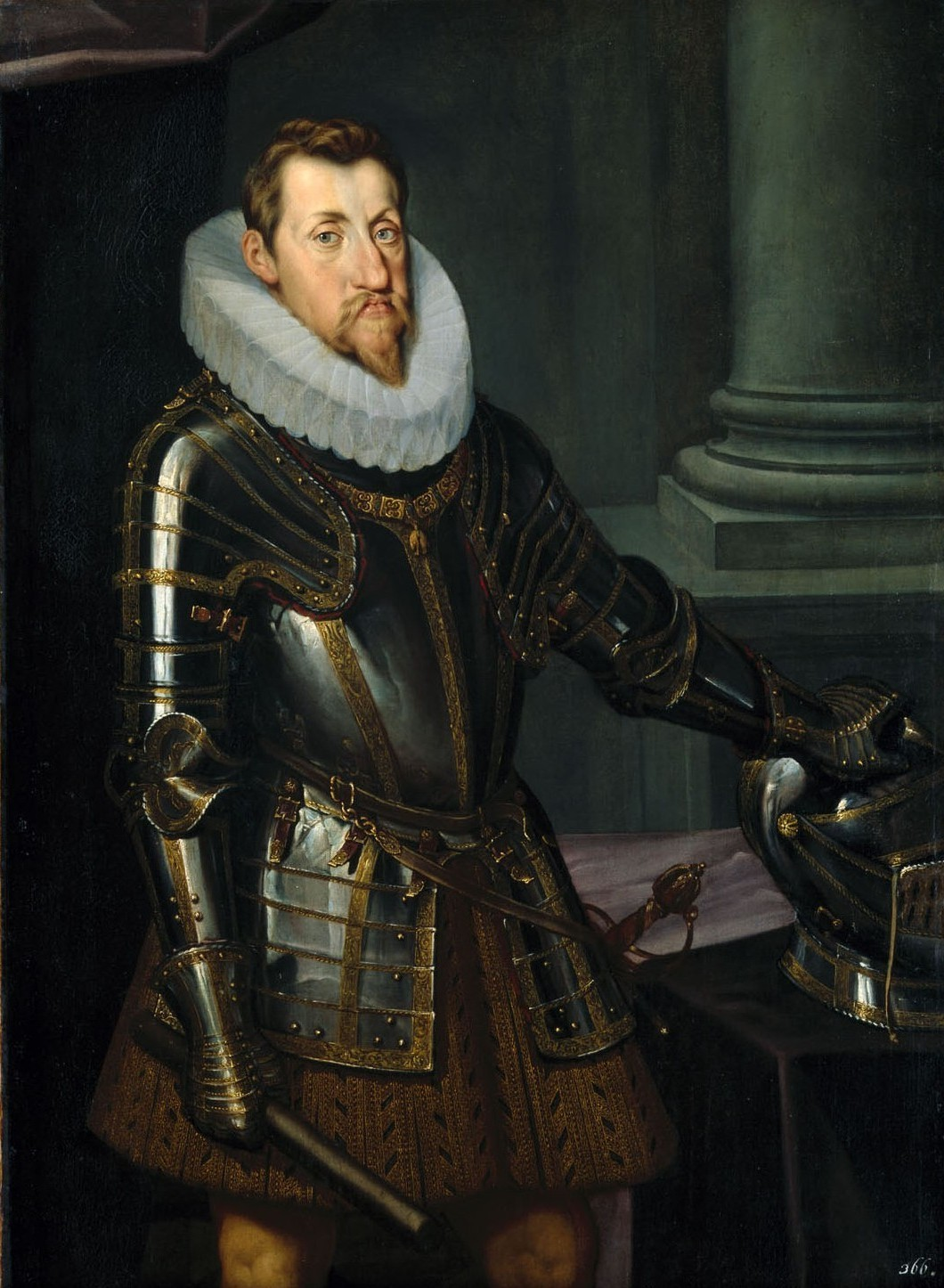
Ferdinand II, Holy Roman Emperor

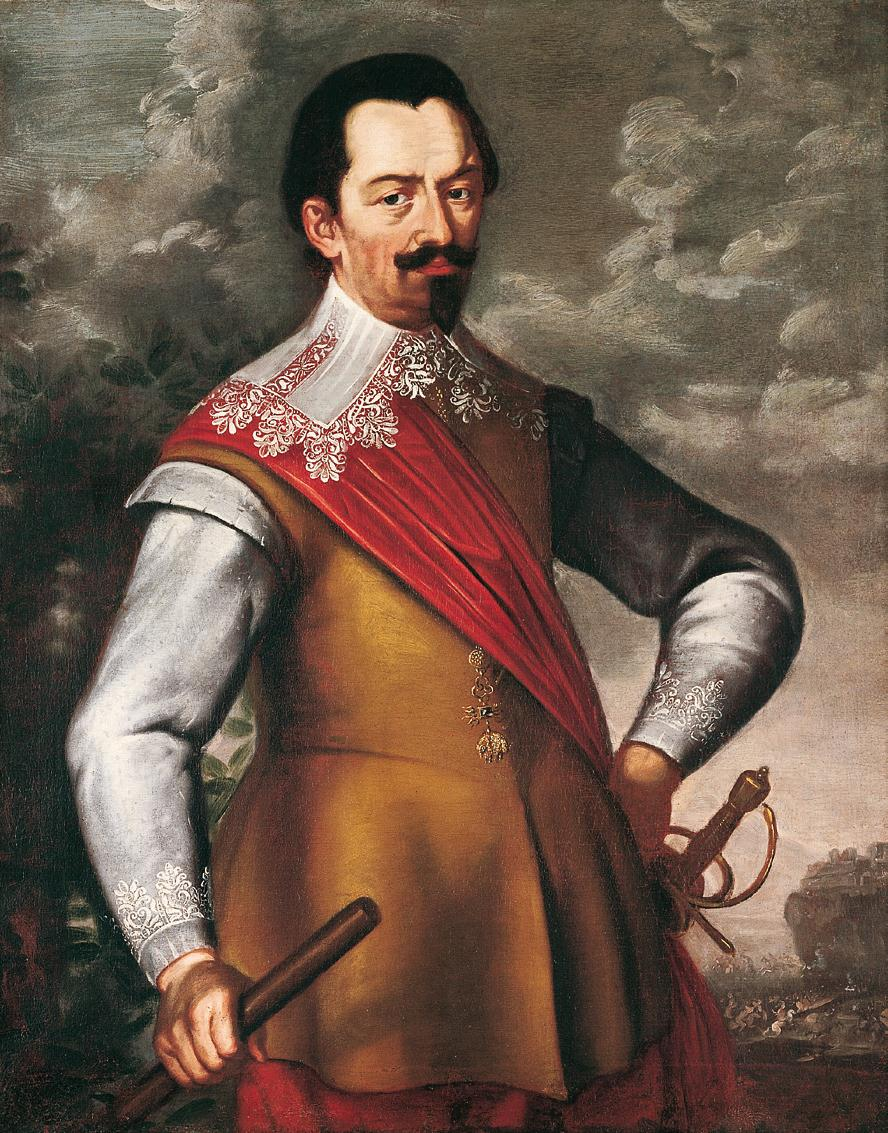
Albrecht von Wallenstein

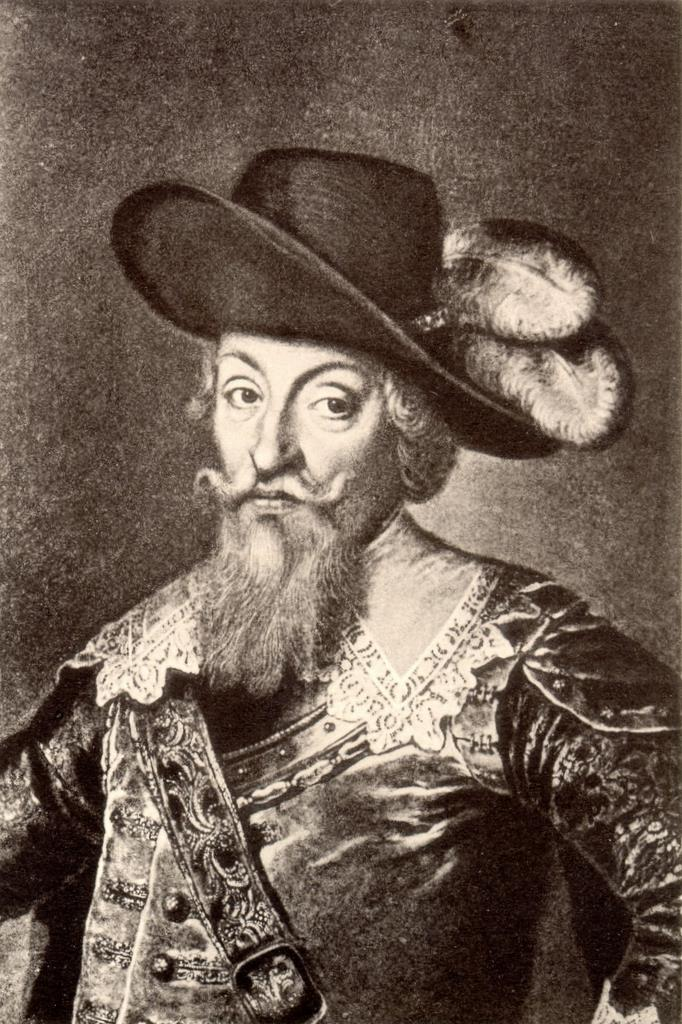
Hans Georg von Arnim
Defendants

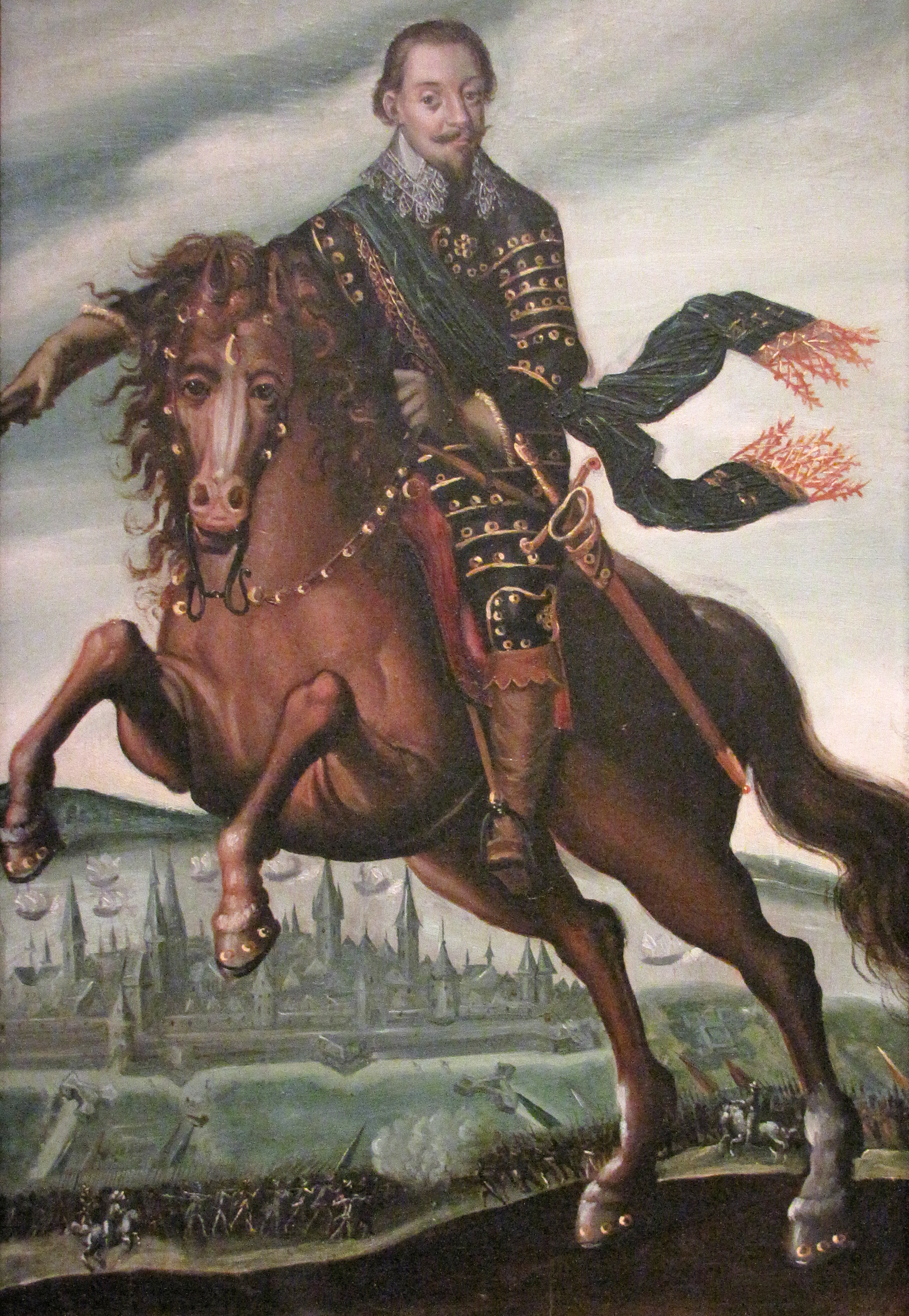
Gustavus Adolphus of Sweden

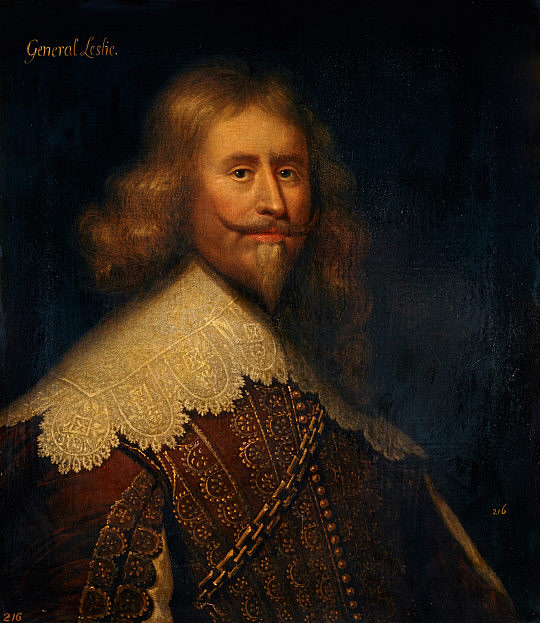
Alexander Leslie

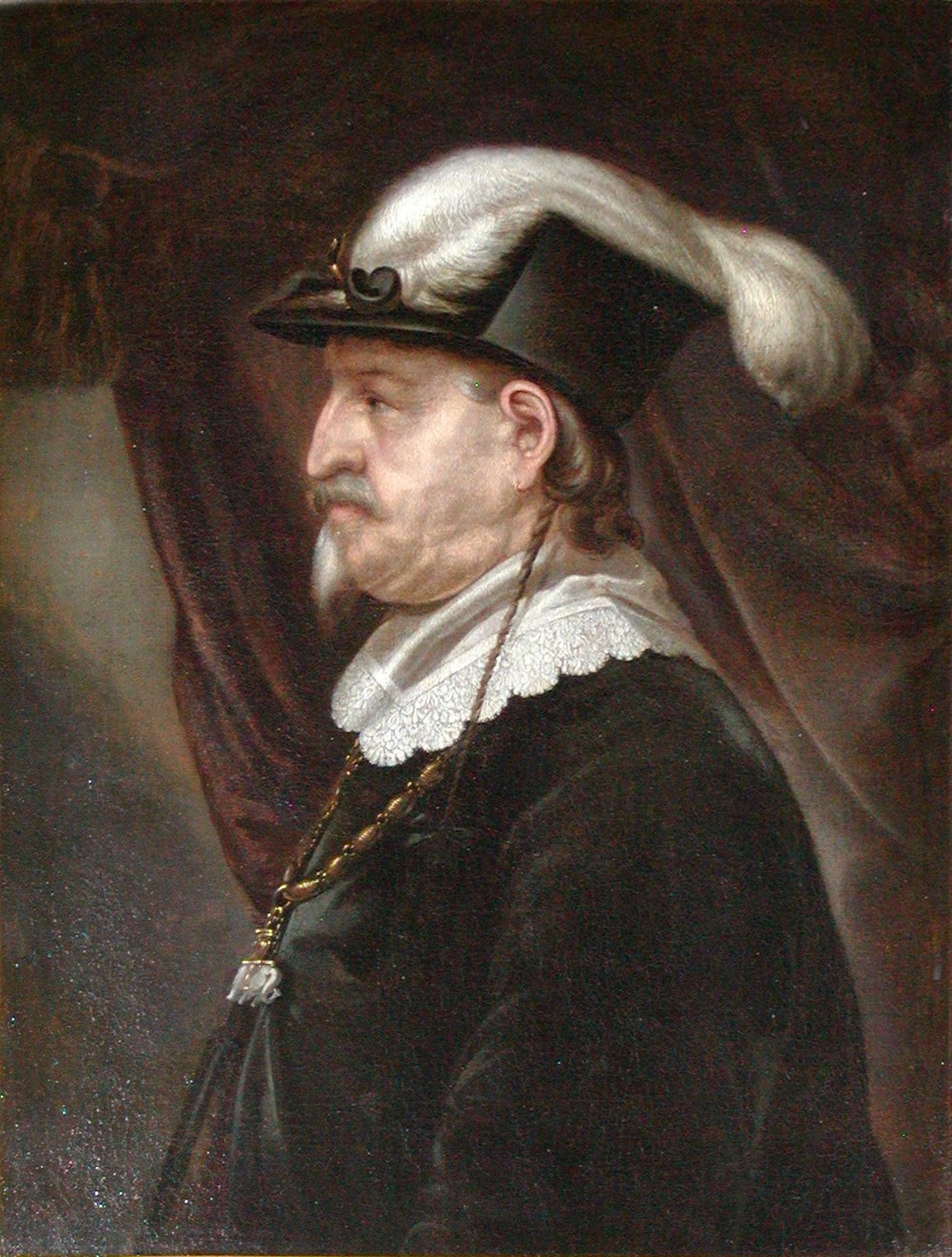
Christian IV of Denmark

== Sources ==
=== Bibliography ===
- Anderson, Ian G (1990). Scotsmen in the service of the Czars. Pentland Press. ISBN 0-946270-74-0.
- Berg, Jonas; Lagercrantz, Bo; Nordiska museet (Stockholm, Sweden); Royal Scottish Museum (1962). "Seventeenth Century - Part 1. Scottish Troops at Stralsund, 1628". Scots in Sweden. Nordiska museet. pp. 37–39.
- Grosjean, Alexia An Unofficial Alliance: Scotland and Sweden, 1569-1654 (Leiden, 2003)
- Heckel, Martin (1983). Deutschland im konfessionellen Zeitalter (in German). Vandenhoeck & Ruprecht. ISBN 3-525-33483-4.
- Heitz, Gerhard; Rischer, Henning (1995). Geschichte in Daten. Mecklenburg-Vorpommern (in German). Münster-Berlin: Koehler&Amelang. ISBN 3-7338-0195-4.
- Keegan, John; Wheatcroft, Andrew (1996). Who's who in military history: From 1453 to the present day (2 ed.). Routledge. ISBN 0-415-12722-X.
- Krause, Gerhard; Balz, Horst Robert (1993). Müller, Gerhard (ed.). Theologische Realenzyklopädie I (in German). De Gruyter. ISBN 3-11-013898-0.
- Krause, Gerhard; Balz, Horst Robert (1993). Müller, Gerhard (ed.). Theologische Realenzyklopädie II (in German). Walter de Gruyter. ISBN 3-11-016295-4.
- Langer, Herbert (2003). "Die Anfänge des Garnisionswesens in Pommern". In Asmus, Ivo; Droste, Heiko; Olesen, Jens E. (eds.). Gemeinsame Bekannte: Schweden und Deutschland in der Frühen Neuzeit (in German). Berlin-Hamburg-Münster: LIT Verlag. ISBN 3-8258-7150-9.
- Lee, Stephen J (2002). The Thirty Years War. Routledge. ISBN 0-415-26862-1.
- Mackillop, Andrew; Murdoch, Steve (2003). "Scotsmen on the Danish-Norwegian Frontier". Military governors and imperial frontiers c. 1600-1800: A study of Scotland and empires. BRILL. ISBN 90-04-12970-7.
- Meier, Martin (2008). "Voraussetzungen dänischer Herrschaft". Vorpommern nördlich der Peene unter dänischer Verwaltung 1715 bis 1721: Aufbau einer Verwaltung und Herrschaftssicherung in einem eroberten Gebiet (in German). Oldenbourg Wissenschaftsverlag. ISBN 978-3-486-58285-7.
- Monro, Robert (1637). His Expedition with the Worthy Scots Regiment called Mac-keyes. Vol. (1/2). London.
- Murdoch, Steve; Grosjean, Alexia (2014). Alexander Leslie and the Scottish Generals of the Thirty Years' War, 1618-1648. London. pp. 47–51.
- Nicklas, Thomas (2002). Macht oder Recht: frühneuzeitliche Politik im Obersächsischen Reichskreis (in German). Franz Steiner Verlag. ISBN 3-515-07939-4.
- Olesen, Jens E (2003). "Christian IV og dansk Pommernpolitik". In Asmus, Ivo; Droste, Heiko; Olesen, Jens E. (eds.). Gemeinsame Bekannte: Schweden und Deutschland in der Frühen Neuzeit (in Danish). Berlin-Hamburg-Münster: LIT Verlag. ISBN 3-8258-7150-9.
- Parker, Geoffrey; Adams, Simon (1997). The Thirty Years' War (2 ed.). Routledge. ISBN 0-415-12883-8.
- Press, Volker (1991). Kriege und Krisen: Deutschland 1600-1715 (in German). C.H.Beck. ISBN 3-406-30817-1.
- Ringmar, Erik (1996). Identity, interest and action: A cultural explanation of Sweden's intervention in the Thirty Years War. Cambridge University Press. ISBN 0-521-56314-3.
- Riis, Thomas, Should Auld Acquaintance Be Forgot (2 vols., Odense, 1988)
- Salmon, Patrick; Barrow, Tony (2003). Britain and the Baltic: Studies in commercial, political and cultural relations 1500-2000. University of Sunderland Press. ISBN 1-873757-49-2.
- Scott, Franklin Daniel (1988). Sweden, the nation's history. SIU Press. ISBN 0-8093-1489-4.
- Stearns, Peter N.; Langer, William Leonard (2001). The Encyclopedia of world history: ancient, medieval, and modern, chronologically arranged (6 ed.). Houghton Mifflin Harcourt. ISBN 0-395-65237-5.
- Sturdy, David J. (2002). Fractured Europe, 1600-1721. Wiley-Blackwell. ISBN 0-631-20513-6.
