= Erik Ringmar =

Swedish professor of political science

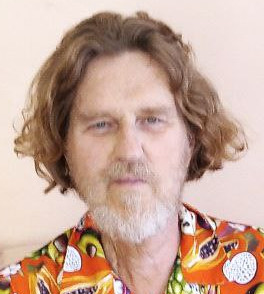
- Born: December 10, 1960; Luleå, Sweden
- Citizenship: Swedish
- Education: Yale University; Uppsala University
- Known for: Recognition theory, global IR theory, academic freedom
- Awards: Fulbright scholarship
- Scientific career
- Fields: International Relations; International History; Political Science
- Workplaces: Ibn Haldun University, Istanbul, Turkey
- Doctoral advisor: Alexander Wendt; Alessandro Pizzorno; James C. Scott

Erik Ringmar is a retired professor of political science.

== Background ==
Ringmar graduated with a PhD from the Department of Political Science, Yale University, in 1993. Between 1995 and 2007 he was senior lecturer in the Department of Government at the London School of Economics, United Kingdom, and between 2007 and 2013 he worked as a professor of political science in China, the last two years as Zhi Yuan Chair Professor of International Relations at Shanghai Jiaotong University, Shanghai, PRC. Between 2013 and 2019 he worked in the department of political science at Lund University, Sweden and then at Ibn Haldun University. Ringmar is a Fulbright Scholar.

== Research ==
Ringmar has published articles on metaphor, the problems of historiography, international law, social theory and phenomenology. His most recent book, published by Cambridge University Press, is a phenomenological study of movement and international politics. Ringmar's academic writings have been translated into Chinese, Korean, Slovak and German. In addition, Ringmar has published journalistic pieces in Huffington Post, Times Higher Education Supplement and Dagens Nyheter.

In the summer of 2019 he gave a TEDx talk entitled, "What Is a Non-Western IR Theory?"

== Personal ==
Ringmar is married to Diane Pranzo and together they have four daughters. In the summer of 2008 he underwent successful cancer surgery, an experience that he chronicled online.

== Bibliography ==
- Ringmar, Erik. 2023. Moving bodies : embodied minds and the world that we made. Cambridge University Press.
- Ringmar, Erik (2019). History of International Relations: A Non-European Perspective (Open Access). Cambridge: Open Book Publishers. doi:10.11647/OBP.0074. ISBN 978-1-78374-022-2.
- Ringmar, E. 2019. Befria universiteten!: om akademisk frihet och statlig styrning. Timbro förlag. ISBN 978-91-7703-170-3
- Ringmar, Erik (2013). Liberal Barbarism: The European Destruction of the Palace of the Emperor of China. New York: Palgrave Macmillan.
- Ringmar, Erik (2008) [1996]. Identity, Interest and Action: A Cultural Explanation of Sweden's Intervention in the Thirty Years War. Cambridge: Cambridge University Press.
- Ringmar, Erik (2009) [2005]. The Mechanics of Modernity in Europe and East Asia: Institutional Origins of Social Change and Stagnation. London: Routledge.
- Ringmar, Erik (2005). Surviving Capitalism: How We Learned to Live with the Market and Remained Almost Human. London: Anthem Press.

== Citations ==
- Google Scholar
