= Treaty of Pyritz =

1493 treaty between the Houses of Pomerania and Hohenzollern

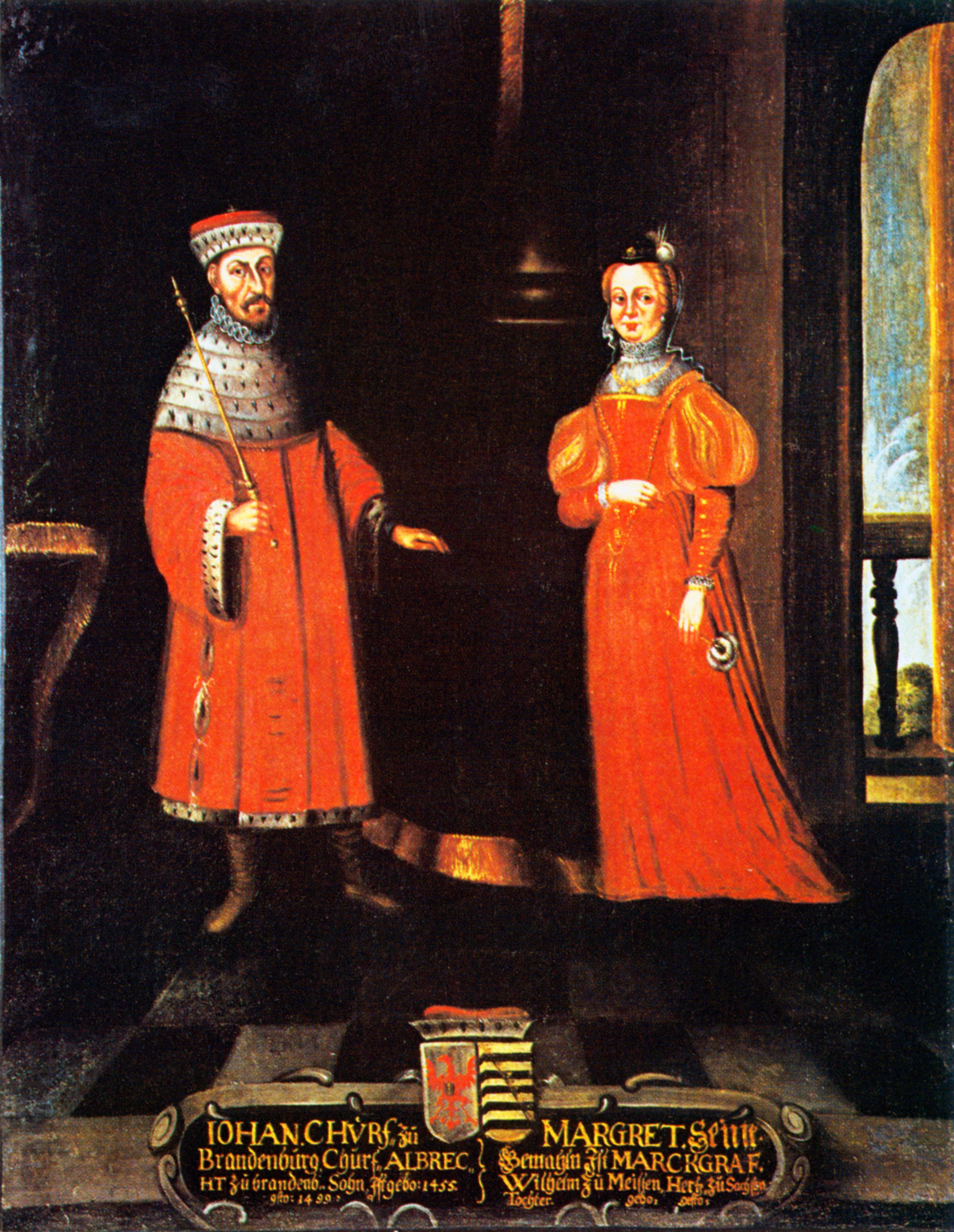
- John Cicero, Elector of Brandenburg (left)
- Type: Legal status and succession in the Duchy of Pomerania
- Signed: 26 and 28 March 1493
- Location: Pyritz, Königsberg
- Signatories: John Cicero, Elector of Brandenburg; Bogislaw X, Duke of Pomerania
- Parties: House of Hohenzollern; House of Pomerania
- Language: German

The Treaty of Pyritz settled claims of the House of Pomerania and the House of Hohenzollern regarding the legal status and succession in the Duchy of Pomerania on 26 and 28 March 1493. John Cicero, Elector of Brandenburg of the Hohenzollern renounced the Electorate of Brandenburg's claims to hold the Pomeranian duchy as a fief on 26 March in Pyritz (now Pyrzyce). In turn, Bogislaw X, Duke of Pomerania acknowledged Brandenburgian succession in his duchy in case of the extinction of his dynasty on 28 March in Königsberg (now Kaliningrad). The treaty was the most important achievement of Bogislaw X's foreign policy. It was confirmed and amended when a final settlement between the two houses was reached in the Treaty of Grimnitz in 1529.

== Background ==
In the 15th century, a longstanding conflict between the Electorate of Brandenburg and the Duchy of Pomerania had flared up again: Brandenburg, then ruled by the House of Hohenzollern, claimed the Pomeranian duchy as a fief, while the House of Pomerania ("Griffins") claimed Imperial immediacy. The frontier between the realms of the two houses was also disputed, and the conflict was often fought out in open war.

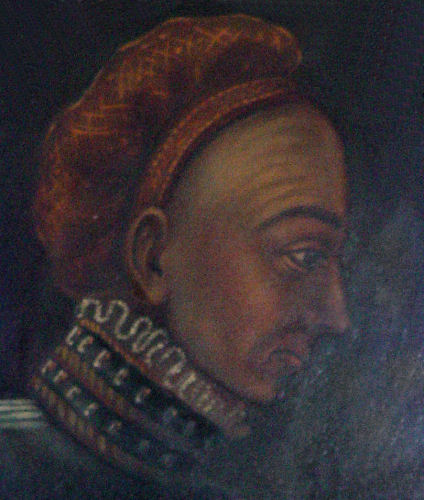
Bogislaw X, Duke of Pomerania

In 1464, the dispute escalated due to the death of Otto III, Duke of Pomerania: Otto III had died without issue, and left his partition of Pomerania, the Duchy of Pomerania-Stettin vacated. Both his relatives from the House of Pomerania and the Hohenzollern claimed succession. In the Treaty of Soldin (1466), the Pomeranian dukes and Brandenburgian electors settled for a scenario where the House of Pomerania would rule Pomerania-Stettin as a Brandenburgian fief.

Yet, this treaty did not come into effect, and the two houses again resorted to warfare. The war was temporarily ended with the Treaty of Prenzlau (1472), when the House of Pomerania had to accept Brandenburgian overlordship and succession as well as territorial losses, but flared up again in 1477. Brandenburg was able to decide the war in her favour, and Bogislaw X, meanwhile the sole Pomeranian duke after his co-rulers had died in 1464, 1474 and 1478, had to accept and renew the treaty of 1472 in the Treaty of Prenzlau (1479).

While in 1479 Bogislaw X had pledged allegiance to Albrecht III, Elector of Brandenburg, he refused to do so to his son, John Cicero, when the latter succeeded in the Brandenburgian electorate. Margarethe, a daughter of Frederick II, Elector of Brandenburg and married to Bogislaw X since 1477, sided with her husband in the feud despite maintaining good relations to her cousin, John Cicero. Yet, Bogislaw X's marriage with Margarethe was not blessed with children. Bogislaw X accused her that she had manipulated her body to prevent conception, so the Pomeranian duchy would fall to Brandenburg according to the treaties of Prenzlau. Margarethe died in 1489. In 1490 Bogislaw married Anna Jagiellon of Poland, but, though Anna was pregnant, no heir was born yet by the time the treaty of Pyritz was concluded.

== Provisions ==
John Cicero, Elector of Brandenburg accepted that the House of Pomerania is not obliged to take the Duchy of Pomerania as a fief from the House of Hohenzollern, and that the dukes of Pomerania would not have to pledge allegiance to the Brandenburgian electors. In turn, Bogislaw X, Duke of Pomerania assured the Hohenzollern their right of succession in the Duchy of Pomerania in case the House of Pomerania became extinct. John Cicero made his assurances on 26 March 1493 in the Pomeranian town of Pyritz, while Bogislaw X responded in the Prussian town of Königsberg on 28 March. The Brandenburgian right of Pomeranian succession was confirmed by oath by 150 Pomeranian prelates and landlords.

== Aftermath ==
With the birth of Georg I, Duke of Pomerania on 11 April 1493, subsequently followed by the birth of four more children to Bogislaw X and Anna Jagiellon, Brandenburg's hopes for prompt succession in Pomerania were thwarted. When in 1495 Bogislaw X was invited to the Imperial Diet in Worms, John Cicero ordered the interception of the invitation. Both John Cicero and Bogislaw X then were absent from the Diet, yet John Cicero had arranged that - in his place - his brother formally received the Duchy of Pomerania as a fief. In the following, Bogislaw X frequently contacted Maximilian I, Holy Roman Emperor to personally receive the Duchy of Pomerania as a fief. In 1521, emperor Maximilian I's successor Charles V on his first Diet in Worms gave the Duchy of Pomerania as a fief to John Cicero's successor Joachim I and his brother Kasimir as well as to Bogislaw X, exploring an opportunity to receive taxes for the duchy from both the Hohenzollern and the House of Pomerania. However, Bogislaw X was then integrated in the Upper Saxon Circle and awarded a seat and a vote in the Imperial Diet, which he seized despite Brandenburgian protests in Nuremberg in 1522.

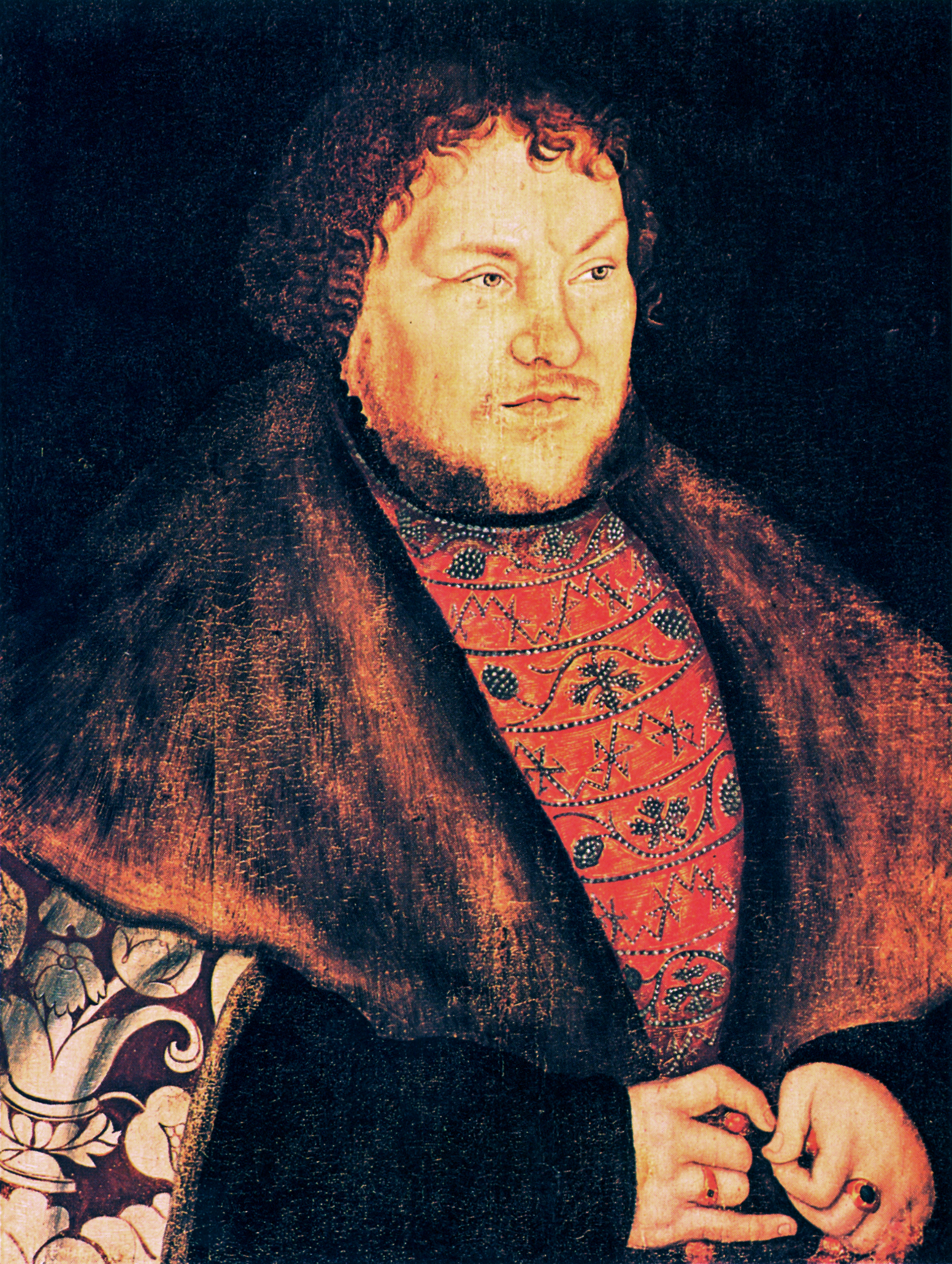
Joachim I Nestor, Elector of Brandenburg

After Bogislaw X's death in 1523, the Brandenburg-Pomeranian conflict continued between Joachim I and Bogislaw X's sons Georg I and Barnim XI who ruled Pomerania in common, but could be solved by diplomacy. In 1526, Joachim I had intervened when the Pomeranian dukes were invited to participate in an Imperial Diet in Speyer. The Pomeranian case was negotiated in Speyer, and high nobles of the Holy Roman Empire mediated the conflict thereafter. In 1529, the Treaty of Grimnitz finally settled the conflict, confirming and amending the treaty of Pyritz: In Grimnitz, Pomerania was confirmed as an immediate imperial fief, yet the Electors of Brandenburg had to be present at every formal investiture and were allowed to touch the Pomeranian flag during the process, furthermore they were allowed to entitle themselves as dukes of Pomerania with the exception of cases when both the Pomeranian dukes and the Brandenburgian electors were present.

The succession clause of the Treaty of Grimnitz would have come into effect in 1637 with the death of the last Griffin duke of Pomerania, yet, as this duke had concluded a conflicting treaty with Sweden seven years before, the Treaty of Stettin (1630), and Pomerania at that time was occupied by superior Swedish forces, the Brandenburg-Pomeranian conflict continued between the houses of Hohenzollern and Sweden.

== Sources ==
=== Bibliography ===
- Bayerische Akademie der Wissenschaften. Historische Kommission, ed. (2003). Neue deutsche Biographie (NDB), Volume I (in German). Duncker & Humblot. ISBN 3-428-00181-8.
- Buchholz, Werner, ed. (1999). Pommern (in German). Siedler. ISBN 3-88680-272-8.
- Croxton, Derek; Tischer, Anuschka (2002). The Peace of Westphalia: a historical dictionary. Greenwood Press. ISBN 0-313-31004-1.
- Heitz, Gerhard; Rischer, Henning (1995). Geschichte in Daten. Mecklenburg-Vorpommern (in German). Münster-Berlin: Koehler&Amelang. ISBN 3-7338-0195-4.
- Materna, Ingo; Ribbe, Wolfgang; Adamy, Kurt (1995). Brandenburgische Geschichte (in German). Akademie Verlag. ISBN 3-05-002508-5.
- Rogge, Jörg (2004). Fürstin und Fürst: Familienbeziehungen und Handlungsmöglichkeiten von hochadeligen Frauen im Mittelalter (in German). Thorbecke. ISBN 3-7995-4266-3.
- Schleinert, Dirk (2007). "Der Codex dipolomaticus Bogislai X". In Scholz, Michael (ed.). Jahrbuch für die Geschichte Mittel- und Ostdeutschlands. Band 53 (in German). Walter de Gruyter. ISBN 3-598-23202-0.
- Stafford, Pauline; Mulder-Bakker, Anneke B. (2001). Gendering the Middle Ages, Volume 12 (3 ed.). Wiley-Blackwell. ISBN 0-631-22651-6.
- Stollberg-Rilinger, Barbara (2008). Des Kaisers alte Kleider: Verfassungsgeschichte und Symbolsprache des Alten Reiches (in German). C.H.Beck. ISBN 3-406-57074-7.
