= Brandenburg–Pomeranian conflict =

Starting in the 12th century, the Margraviate, later Electorate, of Brandenburg was in conflict with the neighboring Duchy of Pomerania over frontier territories claimed by them both, and over the status of the Pomeranian duchy, which Brandenburg claimed as a fief, whereas Pomerania claimed Imperial immediacy. The conflict frequently turned into open war, and despite occasional success, none of the parties prevailed permanently until the House of Pomerania died out in 1637. Brandenburg would by then have naturally have prevailed, but this was hindered by the contemporary Swedish occupation of Pomerania, and the conflict continued between Sweden and Brandenburg–Prussia until 1815, when Prussia incorporated Swedish Pomerania into her Province of Pomerania.

== Early medieval prelude ==
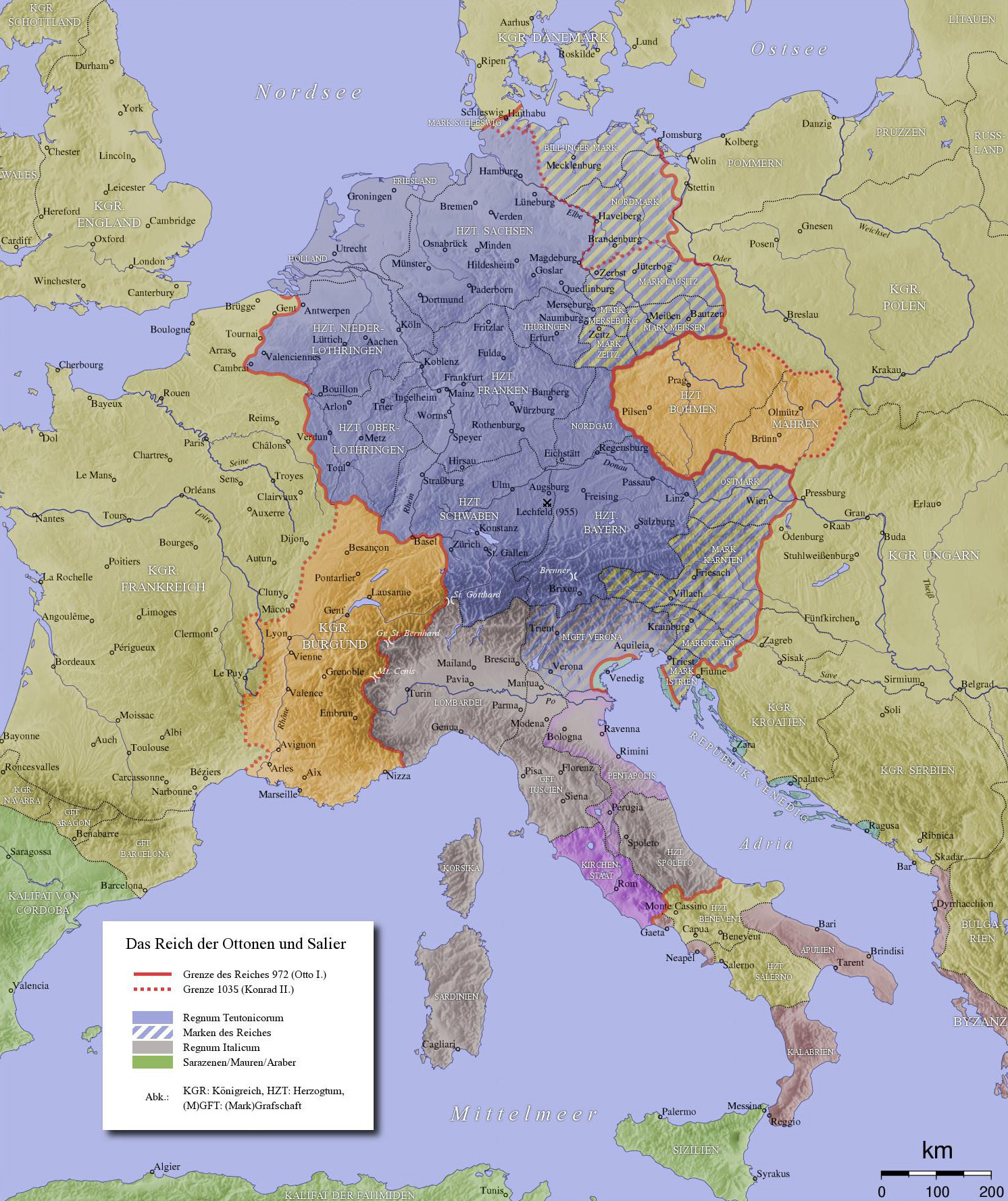
Holy Roman Empire with marches (hatched areas, Northern and Billung march in the Northeast), 10th century

In the 10th century, the area of the future Brandenburg and Pomerania was inhabited by West Slavic tribes, collectively known as Wends. Roughly, the tribes east of the Oder and north of the Warta (Warthe) rivers constituted the Pomeranians and the tribes west of the Oder the Luticians. The classification is uncertain for the tribes living close to the lower Oder, that is the Velunzani on the islands in the Oder estuary, the Prissani on the eastern bank of the lower Oder, and the Ukrani and Recani on the western bank of the lower Oder, which became known as the Uckermark.

The tribes west of the Oder were organized in marches of the Ottonian (Liudolfing) realm, which became the Holy Roman Empire with the coronation of Otto I, Holy Roman Emperor in 962. The marches set up in the area of the future Brandenburg and Pomerania were the Billung March in the north, and the Saxon Eastern March in the south; the boundary was the Peene river. The Saxon Eastern March was soon partitioned, with the area of future northern Brandenburg and southwestern Pomerania re-organized in the Northern March. A rebellion of the Liuticians overthrew the margraves' rule in most of the Northern and Billung marches between 983 and 995. In the 11th century, the Liutician confederation collapsed due to internal struggles, leaving its territory vulnerable to its neighbors' campaigns, including expeditions of the margraves of the Northern March.

== House of Ascania vs House of Pomerania ==
Wartislaw I, Duke of Pomerania and first verified member of the House of Pomerania, conquered the Peene and Tollense areas west of the lower Oder from the Luticians during the 1120s. Albert (Albrecht) the Bear, invested with the March of Lusatia in 1123, was ready to succeed deceased Henry, Count of Stade as margrave of the Northern March in 1128, and was invested with the march by Holy Roman Emperor Lothair of Supplinburg in 1134, after he had already secured his succession of Pribislaw of the Hevelli in 1129. In 1128, Albert participated in the organization of the mission of Otto of Bamberg in the Lutician areas held by Wartislaw I of Pomerania, and supplied him with an escort. When in 1136 Emperor Lothair gave lands in the Peene area to Otto's bishopric of Bamberg, Albert was asked to approve first.

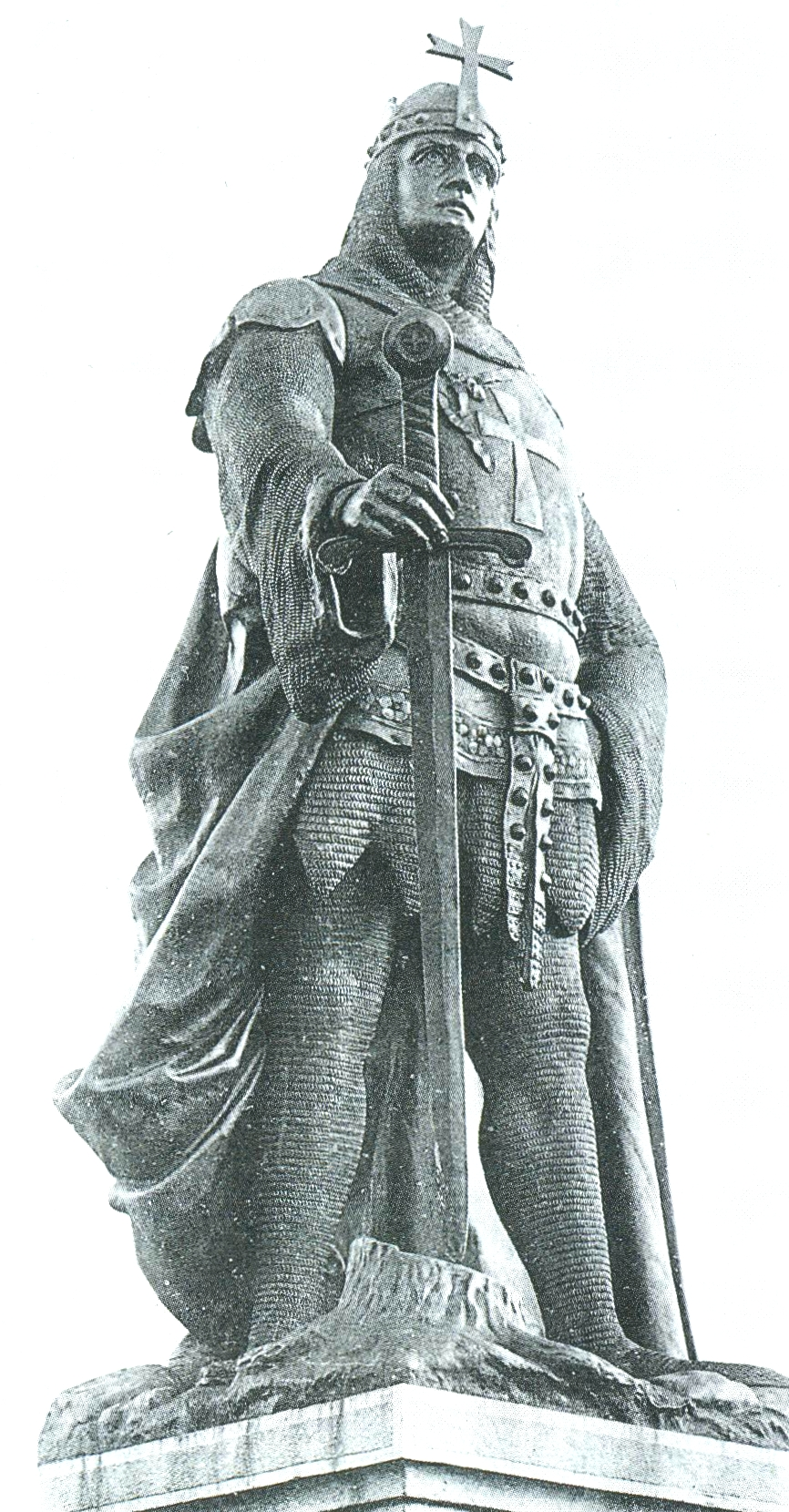
Albert the Bear, statue in Ballenstedt

Focused on the Northern March, Albert renounced his post as the margrave of Lusatia in 1136, which was then fused into the March of Meißen and became the basis of the state of the House of Wettin. In 1138, Conrad III of Germany also invested Albert the Bear with the Duchy of Saxony, but Albert resigned in 1142 due to the opposition of the Saxon nobility, who had favoured and eventually installed then minor Henry the Lion as their duke.

In 1147, Albert participated in the Wendish Crusade to the Pomeranian strongholds of Demmin and Stettin, which however did not result in the acquisition of territories — the size of the Northern March actually controlled by Albert differed significantly from what Emperor Lothair had originally promised. Instead, as a result of the crusade, several Saxon nobles had established petty realms in the march, and the Pomeranians still held vast areas south of the Peene river as well as the Uckermark. Albert however succeeded Pribislaw in the Hevellian territories in 1150, and when he defeated Jaxa of Köpenick and incorporated the latter's territory into his march in 1157, the term Margraviate of Brandenburg replaced the designation Northern March. Albert upheld his claims to Western Pomerania, and campaigned in the Pomeranian-held Uckermark since 1157.

Albert the Bear's successor in Saxony, Henry the Lion, had by then established himself as one of the most powerful nobles in Germany. In pursuit of his own interests in the Wendish territories and with Danish support, Henry defeated his rebellious Obodrite subjects and their Pomeranian allies in the Battle of Verchen near the Pomeranian stronghold of Demmin in 1164. As a consequence, the Pomeranian dukes became Henry's vassals, and supported Henry in subsequent campaigns against the margraves of Brandenburg. However, Henry finally lost the struggle he was engaged in with Holy Roman Emperor Barbarossa, and in 1180 was deprived of his ducal titles. The Pomeranian duke then pledged allegiance to Barbarossa in 1181, thwarting Ascanian ambitions.

Constant Danish military pressure resulted in Danish vassalage of Pomerania in 1184/85. The Ascanian margraves launched several expeditions into Danish Pomerania between 1198 and 1199, and between 1211 and 1214. Despite a temporary sack of Stettin in 1214 and more permanent territorial gains in the Finow area, they were unable to establish themselves in Pomerania, and Danish superiority even led Frederick II, Holy Roman Emperor to renounce all German claims to the area in favour of Denmark in 1214. By then, the margraves restricted themselves to guard the contemporary Brandenburg-Pomeranian frontier by erecting the Oderberg fortress "contra Sclavos" in 1214. Only after the utter defeat of the Danish forces in the Battle of Bornhöved in 1227, was the area reclaimed by the empire. The Brandenburgian margraves then re-enforced their claims on Pomerania, and were invested with the duchy by Frederick II in 1231 in Ravenna.

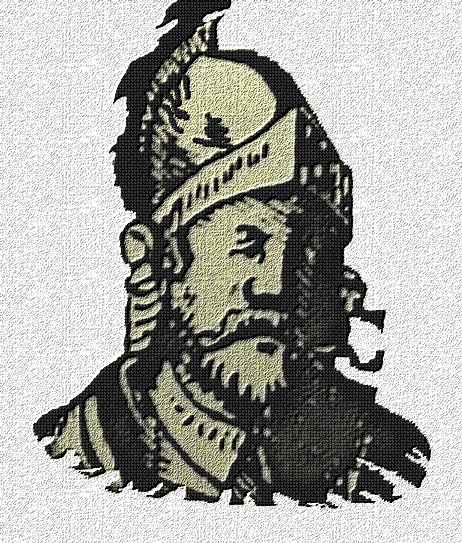
Barnim I, Duke of Pomerania

In the 1230s, the Margraviate of Brandenburg was ruled in common by two brothers of the House of Ascania, John I and Otto III, while the Duchy of Pomerania was partially divided and ruled by two cousins of the House of Pomerania, Wartislaw III of Pomerania-Demmin and Barnim I of Pomerania-Stettin. Johann I of Brandenburg married a daughter of Valdemar Sejr, king of Denmark, and therewith came into possession of half of the terra Wolgast in Pomerania. He then forced Wartislaw III into the Treaty of Kremmen in 1236: Wartislaw III had to recognize Brandenburgian overlordship and succession in Pomerania-Demmin, and cede his territories south of Demmin to Brandenburg.

Also in the 1230s, Barnim I had sold the southern Uckermark between Templin and Angermünde to the margraves, and renounced his claims on the Barnim and Teltow areas. In the subsequent Treaty of Landin (Hohenlandin) in 1250, Barnim I formally accepted Brandenburgian overlordship and ceded the northern Uckermark to Brandenburg, but in turn received Johann's part of Wolgast and managed to rescind the succession clause of Kremmen. Barnim I had to make further territorial concessions when Brandenburg established her Neumark ("New March") along the Warthe (Warta) river in the second half of the 13th century, and in 1267 married Mechthild, daughter of Otto III of Brandenburg.

Barnim I had inherited Pomerania-Demmin after Wartislaw III died without issue in 1264, but the duchy was again internally divided in 1295 – this time into a northern part, Pomerania-Wolgast, and a southern part, Pomerania-Stettin. In 1302, Otto I of Pomerania-Stettin, grandson of Brandenburgian margrave Otto III, made peace with Brandenburg. Tensions with Pomerania-Wolgast eased when Waldemar became the Brandenburgian margrave in 1309, and Brandenburg pawned Schlawe-Stolp to Pomerania in the Treaty of Templin, concluded in 1317. With Waldemar's death without issue, the House of Ascania died out.

Timeline of the Ascanian-Pomeranian conflict
| Date | Event |
|---|---|
| 1120s | Wartislaw I, Duke of Pomerania subdues Liutician areas west of the Oder, including the Peene area. |
| 1134 | Albrecht von Ballenstein ("The Bear") receives the Northern March (up to the Peene river) as a fief from Lothair III, Holy Roman Emperor |
| 1147 | Wendish Crusade |
| 1157 | Margraviate of Brandenburg established, successor of the Northern March |
| 1164 | Battle of Verchen, Western Pomerania becomes fief of Henry the Lion (Duchy of Saxony) |
| 1177 | After several Danish campaigns into Pomeranian territory and protection by Henry the Lion absent, Bogislaw I, Duke of Pomerania travels to Poland in the spring to ask the Polish duke for support. Waldemar of Denmark and Henry the Lion meet and agree on a combined Danish-German expedition; Otto I, Margrave of Brandenburg supports Henry with troops. Siege of Demmin, Henry's control re-established. |
| 1178-80 | Pomeranian forces participate in campaigns against the Bishopric of Magdeburg and in Brandenburgian territories as far south as Jüterbog and Lusatia. Casimir I, Duke of Pomerania is killed in battle when supporting Henry the Lion against Otto I, Margrave of Brandenburg. Pomerania temporarily expands south as far as the Spree river. |
| 1181 | Emperor Frederick Barbarossa confirms Bogislaw I as duke of Pomerania. |
| 1180s-1227 | Pomerania is subject of Denmark's Brandenburgian campaigns; short-lived capture of Stettin in 1214 |
| December 1231 | Frederick II, Holy Roman Emperor gives the Duchy of Pomerania as a fief to the Margraviate of Brandenburg. |
| June 1236 | Treaty of Kremmen: Wartislaw III, Duke of Pomerania hands over large parts of Pomerania-Demmin to Brandenburg and takes the remainder as a fief from the margraves. |
| 1250 | Treaty of Landin: Barnim I, Duke of Pomerania hands over the Uckermark to Brandenburg in return for Brandenburg's renunciation of its succession claims in Pomerania. Barnim I and Wartislaw I take the remainder of the Duchy of Pomerania as a fief from Brandenburg. |
| 1250s | Brandenburg expands eastward; Neumark established partially with gains from Pomerania |
| 1255 | War between Barnim I, Duke of Pomerania and John I, Margrave of Brandenburg |
| After 1261 | Brandenburg gains the Soldin and Zehden areas from Pomerania. |
| 1266 | Barnim I, Duke of Pomerania occupies Schlawe-Stolp. |
| March 1273 | Brandenburgian forces raid the Stettin and Pyritz areas in Central Pomerania. |
| 1269 | Brandenburg gains the Arnswalde area from Pomerania. |
| 1277 | The Brandenburgian margraves purchase the Schlawe area from Wizlaw II, Prince of Rügen; Pomeranians withdraw. |
| 1 June 1278 | Barnim I, Duke of Pomerania receives the Pomeranian-Brandenburgian frontier area between the Ihna river branches as a fief from Brandenburg in return for a promise to aid Brandenburg against the bishop of Magdeburg |
| 1280 | Brandenburg gains the Bernstein, Arnhausen and Schivelbein areas from Pomerania. |
| 1283–1284 | Warfare with Brandenburg, primarily for the towns of Stargard, Greifenhagen and Gartz (Oder) |
| 13 June 1283 | In Rostock the Pomeranian nobility allies against Brandenburg; the Pomeranian towns of Stralsund, Greifswald, Anklam and Demmin are free to conclude alliances as they wish |
| 4 July 1283 | The Pomeranian dukes ask Lübeck for support against Brandenburg. Lübeck aids the dukes, and so does the Principality of Rügen |
| 28 October 1283 | Brandenburg conquers the Stargard area; parts of the local nobility side with Brandenburg |
| 13 August 1284 | Treaty of Vierraden: Emperor Rudolf mediates a peace. Pomerania pays war reparations to Brandenburg; Brandenburg returns occupied castles to Pomerania; an arbitration panel is set up. |
| 1290 | Brandenburg renounces her claims to the secular territory of the Bishopric of Cammin |
| 5 November 1292 | Wizlaw and Jaromar, princes of Rügen, sign a treaty with Brandenburg concerning the border between Pomerelia and the Bishopric of Cammin; five knights are appointed arbitrators. |
| 1298 | Bogislaw IV, Duke of Pomerania with Polish support attacks the Brandenburgian New March, devastating the Arnswalde and Bernstein areas. |
| 14 February 1302 | Alliance between Brandenburg and Otto I of Pomerania-Stettin; border fortifications deconstructed |
| 1306 | Bogislaw IV, Duke of Pomerania supports Poland in her war against Brandenburg. |
| 17 July 1307 | Peter von Neuenburg of the Swenzones receives Schlawe-Stolp, Pollnow, Tuchel and Neuenburg as Brandenburgian fiefs |
| 1308 | Kammin destroyed by Brandenburgian forces |
| 9 December 1314 | Brandenburg renounces claims to the Loitz area in favour of the Principality of Rügen in return for a payment. |
| 1314 | Brandenburg, Stralsund and the Pomeranian dukes ally and fight against a Danish-led coalition. |
| 24/25 November 1317 | Treaty of Templin: Pomerania gains Schlawe-Stolp from Brandenburg. |
| 14 August 1319 | With the death of Waldemar, Margrave of Brandenburg, the Brandenburg branch of the House of Ascania dies out. Otto I of Pomerania-Stettin, who had fled to Waldemar from internal conflicts in Pomerania, is reconciled with Wartislaw IV of Pomerania-Wolgast |

== House of Pomerania vs House of Wittelsbach ==
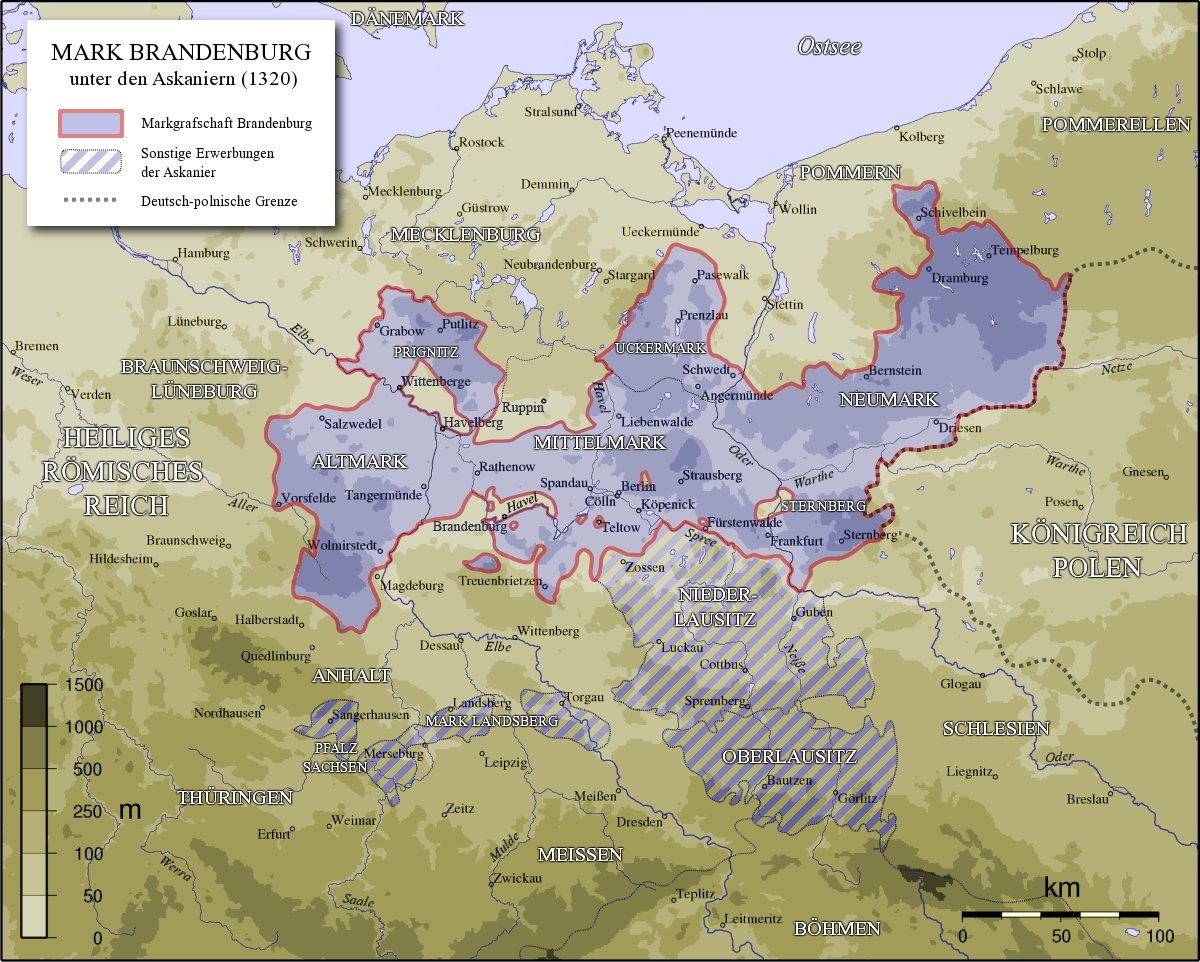
Margraviate of Brandenburg in 1320.

The House of Wittelsbach (also House of Bavaria) did not immediately succeed the House of Ascania as margraves of Brandenburg: Since the electors of the Holy Roman Emperor disagreed in 1314, a war ensued between the two candidates Louis of Wittelsbach and Frederick of Habsburg that lasted until 1322, when Louis prevailed in the Battle of Mühldorf. Thus, the death of Ascanian margrave Waldemar was not followed by a proper investiture of another noble with the Margraviate of Brandenburg due to the lack of an established emperor.

The closest relative of deceased Waldemar was his ten-year-old cousin Henry, who is unlikely to have had valid claims on the margraviate. Henry was the son of Waldermar's uncle Henry of Landsberg, a distant relative of both Wartislaw IV, Duke of Pomerania-Wolgast and Rudolf I, Duke of Saxe-Wittenberg from another line of the House of Ascania, who was married to a daughter of former Ascanian margrave Otto V. Wartislaw IV quickly advanced into eastern Brandenburg, took the boy into custody, had the local nobility formally declare him Henry's custodian, and acted as the de facto ruler of the margraviate.

Rudolf I on the other hand declared himself custodian of Waldemar's widow and temporarily took over her possessions in western and central Brandenburg (Havelland, Teltow and Barnim). Rudolf I's plans were thwarted when Waldemar's widow married Otto of Brunswick in late 1319. Yet, he continued his occupation of Brandenburgian territories and by 1320 controlled Havelland, Teltow, Barnim, Zauche and Lower Lusatia. Like Wartislaw IV, Rudolf I tried to take young Henry into custody, and probably managed to do so in early 1320. Henry died in the summer of 1320. In anticipation of a possible take-over of Brandenburg by a rival who then could claim Pomerania as a Brandenburgian fief, the Pomeranian dukes took their duchy as a fief from the bishops of Cammin the same year.

Meanwhile, other neighbors of Brandenburg also annexed frontier areas of the seemingly vacated margraviate – Silesia took the Görlitz area, Bohemia the Bautzen area, and Mecklenburgian forces occupied the Prignitz and advanced into the Uckermark. Pomeranian forces had also advanced into the Uckermark, halted the Mecklenburgian campaign and occupied the Prenzlau and Pasewalk areas. In addition, the Pomeranian dukes as well as Rudolf I of Saxe-Wittenberg claimed the Lebus area.

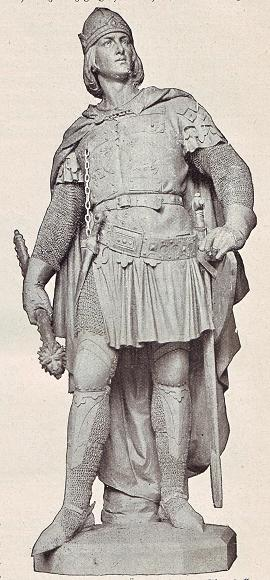
Louis V, Duke of Bavaria (Louis the Brandenburger)

After Louis of the House of Wittelsbach, later crowned Louis IV, Holy Roman Emperor, had decided the war against the House of Habsburg in his favour in September 1322, he gave the Margraviate of Brandenburg to his seven-year-old son, Louis V "the Brandenburger" in 1323. The formal investiture was issued in 1324, and included the Duchy of Pomerania as a Brandenburgian fief. Rudolf I in late 1324 withdrew from Brandenburgian areas in turn for a compensation, The House of Wittelsbach subsequently gained control over the margraviate until they were in full charge in 1343. During this process, the Pomeranians had to withdraw from the Uckermark after a series of battles throughout the late 1320s and early 1330s. In 1330, they took their duchy as a papal fief to circumvent Brandenburg's claims. In 1338, they concluded a peace with Brandenburg, who renounced her claims on overlordship but maintained the right of succession.

In 1348 the conman "Falscher Waldemar" pretended to be Waldemar, Margrave of Brandenburg, claiming he had been declared dead erroneously while on a pilgrimage to the Holy Land. Probably a strawman of Charles IV, Holy Roman Emperor of the House of Luxembourg, and/or the Anhaltine and Saxon branches of the House of Ascania, he was invested with the margraviate between 1348 and 1350, and took on his position as a margrave with military support of Charles IV and the Ascanians. The House of Wittelsbach was expelled from most of Brandenburg and only controlled the Neumark and some adjacent areas. Together with Denmark, the Pomeranian dukes sided with the Wittelsbachs, and the alliance had already gained ground in 1350 when Charles IV re-invested the House of Wittelsbach with Brandenburg. Louis VI the Roman, margrave between 1351 and 1365, had to re-establish his rule against the opposition of the Ascanians, which he accomplished by 1355. During this process, the Brandenburg-Pomeranian border in the Uckermark was settled in 1354.

When war broke out again in the beginning of the 1370s between the Pomeranian dukes and Louis VI' successor Otto V "the lazy", Pomerania was allied to Charles IV: Following a policy of territorial expansion and economical consolidation of his Kingdom of Bohemia, Charles IV of the House of Luxembourg had already before Louis IV the Roman's death in 1365 concluded a treaty with both Louis IV and his brother, Otto V, for succession of Charles IV's son Wenzel (Wenceslaus) IV in Brandenburg. Furthermore, Otto V had laid Brandenburg's administration in Charles IV's hands for six years in 1365. In 1373, Charles IV forced Otto V to sign the Treaty of Fürstenwalde: Otto V renounced his claims to Brandenburg (since the Golden Bull of 1356 an electorate) in favour of the House of Luxembourg in return for a compensation with 300,000 gulden, paid by pawning to him parts of New Bohemia (Charles IV's designation for his gains in the Upper Palatinate).

Timeline of the Pomerania-Wittelsbach conflict
| Date | Event |
|---|---|
| 1320 | Wartislaw IV acts as the custodian for minor Waldemar's cousin Henry (Heinrich) until Henry's death on 18 June. |
| 1320 | Pomeranian dukes take their duchy as a fief from the bishops of Cammin to avoid it becoming a fief of the next Brandenburgian margrave |
| 24 June 1324 | Louis IV ("the Bavarian") gives Pomerania as a fief to his son, Louis V, Duke of Bavaria ("the Brandenburger"). Louis IV was banned by the pope on 23 March. |
| 18 November 1324 | in Templin, Brandenburg allies with the Bishopric of Cammin |
| 10 August 1325 | Pope John XXII calls the Pomeranian dukes to oppose the Brandenburgian margrave with all means. |
| 5 September 1327 | Treaty of Ueckermünde: The Pomeranian dukes and the Brandenburgian margrave agree on a formal peace. The question of fiefdom is spared. Barnim III, Duke of Pomerania agrees to marry Mechthild (also Mathilda), daughter of Rudolf I, Duke of Bavaria, yet the marriage never takes place. |
| 1328 | Louis IV becomes emperor on 27 January, and orders the Pomeranian dukes to take their duchy as a fief from Brandenburg. Brandenburg and Pomerania, who were negotiating in Naulin near Pyritz, terminate these negotiations when the order arrives on 24 February |
| 29 January 1330 | truce between Brandenburg and Pomerania |
| 1330 | Pomeranian dukes take their duchy as a fief from the pope John XXII to avoid it became a fief of Brandenburg |
| 12 February and 18 August 1331 | the pope orders the Pomeranian dukes to oppose the Brandenburgian margraves |
| 13 March 1331 | the Pomeranian dukes receive the Duchy of Pomerania as a papal fief |
| 1 August 1332 | Battle of Kremmer Damm: Barnim III, Duke of Pomerania defeats the Brandenburgian army |
| 28 June 1333 | Treaty of Lippehne: three-year peace between Brandenburg and Pomerania, the question of fiefdom is spared. A formal alliance is concluded on 3 December 1334. |
| 1334 | Brandenburg renounces her claims on Pomerania-Wolgast |
| 1338 | Louis IV, Holy Roman Emperor renounces Brandenburgian claims on Pomerania-Stettin except for the right of succession. Pomerania and Brandenburg conclude a formal peace. |
| 12 June 1348 | Charles IV, Holy Roman Emperor grants the Pomeranian dukes the Duchy of Pomerania and the Principality of Rügen as an imperial fief, Brandenburg's claims are neglected. |
| 4 April 1354 | Barnim III, Duke of Pomerania and Louis VI the Roman partition the Uckermark: Pomerania receives the eastern parts with Schwedt, Angermünde, Gramzow and Brüssow. Pasewalk refuses to become a part of Brandenburg and pledges allegiance to the dukes of Pomerania-Wolgast. In 1359, Louis pawns Pasewalk and additional areas to Pomerania-Wolgast. |
| 1370 | alliance between the emperor and the Pomeranian dukes against Brandenburg. Imperial confirmation of the Pomeranian possessions in the Uckermark. |
| 1371 | Valdemar IV of Denmark mediates a peace between Pomerania and Brandenburg confirming the previous partition of the Uckermark. |
| 1372 | war between Brandenburg and Pomerania for the Uckermark, Bishopric of Cammin sides with Brandenburg |
| 24 August 1372 | Battle of Königsberg (Neumark): Casimir III (IV), Duke of Pomerania killed in battle. |
| October/November 1372 | peace between Pomerania and Brandenburg, Uckermark confirmed as part of Pomerania |
| 18 August 1373 | Treaty of Fürstenwalde: Otto V of the House of Wittelsbach abdicates |

== House of Luxembourg vs House of Pomerania ==
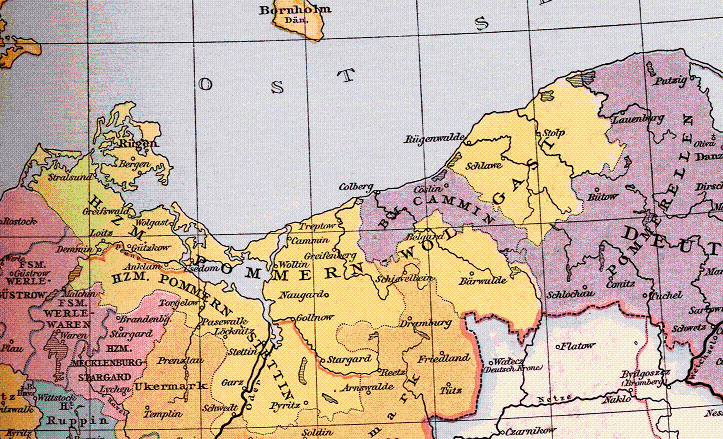
The Duchy of Pomerania (yellow) in 1400, P.-Stettin and P.-Wolgast are indicated; purple: Diocese of Cammin (BM. Cammin) and the Teutonic Order state; orange: Margraviate of Brandenburg; pink: duchies of Mecklenburg

The Pomeranian dukes were on good terms with Charles IV, who gained the Electorate of Brandenburg for his House of Luxembourg de facto from 1365 to 1371, and de jure in 1373. Charles IV had granted the House of Pomerania their Duchy of Pomerania as an imperial fief, and border disputes were settled or suspended.

Charles IV's heirs did not continue his policy of territorial integration and economical consolidation in Brandenburg: instead, the electorate faced internal partitions and economical decay. The Pomeranian dukes discontinued the formerly good relations with the Luxembourgians and successfully campaigned in the Uckermark on their own initiative or as allies of Brandenburg's opponents, shifting the border with Brandenburg southwards beyond Prenzlau. In 1411, the Luxembourgians resigned from the electorate, and transferred their title to Frederick IV, Burgrave of Nuremberg of the House of Hohenzollern (also House of Zollern), who started his reign in Brandenburg as Frederick I.

Timeline of the Luxembourg-Pomeranian conflict
| Date | Event |
|---|---|
| 1373/1374 | House of Luxembourg gains Brandenburg on 2 October 1373, stable peace with Pomerania in 1374. Pomeranian dukes hold positions in the Brandenburgian administration. |
| 1388 | ducal forces of Pomerania-Stettin invade the Uckermark |
| 1393 | ducal forces of Pomerania-Stettin invade the Uckermark |
| 25 November 1399 | Battle of Neuensund am Karrenberg: Pomerania and Mecklenburg defeat Brandenburg and acquire Brandenburg-held territory in the Uckermark, including Prenzlau |

== House of Hohenzollern vs House of Pomerania ==
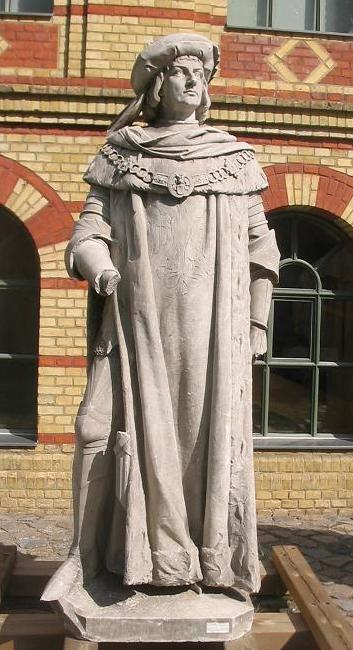
Frederick I

When Frederick I of the House of Hohenzollern took over the Electorate of Brandenburg in 1411, he and his successors restricted the influence of the local nobles, towns and clergy, and followed a policy of territorial expansion. Since the eastern frontier with Pomerania, the Neumark, was pawned to the Teutonic Order state from 1402 to 1455, the western frontier (Uckermark) was in the focus of the Brandenburg–Pomeranian conflict: The first major battle between the Pomeranian and Hohenzollern armies took place in 1412 at Kremmer Damm, only one year after Frederick I had taken over the electorate.

The Duchy of Pomerania was at that time internally divided into petty realms, each such Teilherzogtum was ruled by a distinct member of the House of Pomerania. The first series of wars was primarily fought between Frederick I and the dukes of Pomerania-Stettin, allied to the powerful Brandenburgian noble family von Quitzow, and resulted in some Brandenburgian gains, the expulsion of the von Quiltzows, the imperial ban of the dukes and towns of Pomerania-Stettin, and finally a temporary peace between Brandenburg and Pomerania concluded in Eberswalde in 1415. The Pomeranian dukes allied with the dukes of Mecklenburg in 1418 and renewed their attacks, but were decisively defeated by Brandenburgian forces in the streets of Angermünde in 1420 and had to hand over the Uckermark in the subsequent Treaty of Perleberg. In 1425, the anti-Brandenburgian alliance launched a more successful campaign, after which the Uckermark was divided between Brandenburg and Pomerania in a second treaty of Eberswalde in 1427.

In 1444, war about the border in the Uckermark broke out anew. After four years of fighting, Brandenburg and Pomerania in the Peace of Prenzlau (1448) settled for a division of the Uckermark that only slightly differed from the division of 1427. In 1459, Brandenburg gained a few strongholds in the Uckermark for aiding several Pomeranian dukes in an internal struggle with their relative Eric II.

With the death of Otto III of Pomerania-Stettin in 1464, a series of wars was fought for Otto III's succession, claimed by both the House of Pomerania and the House of Hohenzollern. The battlefields were the Pomerania-Stettin, Uckermark and Neumark areas, and the war was halted only for short periods by the Treaty of Soldin (1466) and Treaty of Prenzlau (1472). The Treaty of Prenzlau (1479) finally ended the war, largely confirming the terms of the previous treaties: Pomerania-Stettin remained under the rule of the House of Pomerania, who in turn became vassals of the electors of Brandenburg.

The Peace of Prenzlau was followed by a series of negotiations, which led to the conclusion of the preliminary Treaty of Pyritz in 1493, and the final Treaty of Grimnitz in 1529: The Duchy of Pomerania became an imperial immediate fief, but the members of the House of Pomerania had to receive it in the presence of Brandenburgian representatives, and Brandenburg was granted the right of succession in the Pomeranian duchy in case the House of Pomerania became extinct.

Timeline of the Hohenzollern-Pomeranian conflict
| Date | Event |
|---|---|
| 11 January 1411 | House of Hohenzollern gains Brandenburg |
| 24 October 1412 | Second Battle of Kremmer Damm: Forces of Frederick I, Elector of Brandenburg face forces of Otto II and Casimir VI of Pomerania-Stettin, outcome undecided |
| 19 November 1413 | alliance between Brandenburg and Pomerania-Wolgast, renewed and expanded with Mecklenburg in the summer of 1414. Brandenburg gains Strasburg and Prenzlau in the Uckermark. |
| late 1414 | Pomerania-Stettin invades Brandenburg |
| 10 May 1415 | Frederick I, Elector of Brandenburg successfully sues the dukes of Pomerania-Stettin at the imperial court, resulting in an Imperial ban |
| 5 November 1415 | Magdalena, daughter of Frederick I, Elector of Brandenburg, promised to Wartislaw IX, Duke of Pomerania. Marriage never takes place. |
| 16 December 1415 | Treaty of Eberswalde: peace between Pomerania-Stettin and Brandenburg, questions of Uckermark and fiefdom remain unsettled |
| 21 November 1418 | Treaty of Ueckermünde: the dukes of Pomerania, Mecklenburg-Schwerin, Mecklenburg-Werle and Mecklenburg-Stargard ally against the Hohenzollern of Brandenburg, Poland and Eric of Pomerania promise support. |
| spring of 1419 | allies go to war against Brandenburg, battles in the Strasburg area |
| March 1420 | Battle of Angermünde: allies defeated by Brandenburg |
| August 1420 | Treaty of Perleberg: peace treaty, Brandenburg gains the Uckermark |
| 1425 | allies go to war against Brandenburg: Brandenburgian defeat near Vierraden, Prenzlau sacked by Pomeranian forces |
| 22 May 1427 | Treaty of Eberswalde: peace treaty, Brandenburg receives Angermünde, Pomerania keeps Greifenberg, the emperor is to decide the dispute concerning the fiefdom status |
| 1440 | Brandenburg-Pomeranian alliance against Mecklenburg-Stargard in April, peace treaty on 8 May 1442. Pomerania-Wolgast does not sign the peace |
| 1444–1448 | Pomerania and Brandenburg go to war when Brandenburg demands the pursuit of an imperial order regarding territorial claims in the Uckermark. Battles primarily in the Pasewalk, Angermünde and Oderberg areas |
| 3 May 1448 | Treaty of Prenzlau: truce, Brandenburg renounces claims to Pasewalk, but retains the right of succession for the town |
| 6 September 1459 | Internal struggle in the House of Pomerania for the heritage of deceased Eric of Pomerania. Wartislaw X and Otto III of Pomerania ally with Brandenburg against Eric II, Duke of Pomerania. Brandenburg gains Pasewalk, Alttorgelow and Neutorgelow as a pawn. |
| 1464 | Otto III, Duke of Pomerania dies without issue on 10 September, leaving Pomerania-Stettin vacant. Pomerania-Wolgast and Brandenburg both claim succession in Pomerania-Stettin. Negotiations throughout 1465. |
| 21 January 1466 | Treaty of Soldin: Dukes of Pomerania-Wolgast become dukes in Pomerania-Stettin as Brandenburgian vassals. |
| 14 October 1466 | Treaty of Soldin declared void by the imperial court. |
| July 1468-May 1472 | war between Pomerania and Brandenburg |
| 30 May 1472 | Treaty of Prenzlau: Brandenburg keeps her territorial gains in the Uckermark and the Pomeranian ducal title, Pomerania-Wolgast becomes a Brandenburgian fief |
| 1477–1478 | war between Pomerania and Brandenburg. Pomeranian forces attack Brandenburgian forces in Gartz, Brandenburg withstands in 1477, but loses Gartz on 6 April 1478, and Löcknitz on 20 May 1478. Brandenburgian counter-attack launched on 3 July 1478, sack of Bahn on 24 July, devastation of the Pyritz area, storm and sack of Bernstein, Saatzig and Vierraden. |
| 28 September 1478 | Poland mediates a truce |
| 26 June 1479 | Treaty of Prenzlau: Bogislaw X, only remaining Pomeranian duke, takes the Duchy of Pomerania as a Brandenburgian fief. Brandenburg keeps her territorial gains (14 castles), Gartz stays with Pomerania. |
| 26 March 1493 | Treaty of Pyritz between Johann, Elector of Brandenburg and Bogislaw X. The members of the House of Pomerania do not need to take the duchy as a fief from Brandenburg, nor do they need to pledge allegiance to the elector, Brandenburg retains the right of succession in the duchy. |
| 15 July 1495 | Holy Roman Emperor approves of the treaty of Pyritz, but includes the Duchy of Pomerania with the Brandenburgian possessions. |
| 1500 | Bogislaw X re-negotiates the treaty of Pyritz with Johann's successor, Joachim I, Elector of Brandenburg, with the result that Pomerania is a Brandenburgian fief free to serve the emperor. |
| 1518–1519 | conflict between Brandenburg and Pomerania regarding the Oder trade. |
| 28 May 1521 | Holy Roman Emperor issues a document making Pomerania an immediate imperial fief. Delivery hindered by Brandenburg. |
| 1522 | negotiations about the status of the Duchy of Pomerania in Nuremberg (spring) and Prenzlau (September), no result. |
| 23 August 1526 and 12 April 1529 | negotiations about the status of Pomerania at the Imperial Diets in Speyer initiated by George I, Duke of Pomerania, no result. |
| August 1529 | Pomeranian and Brandenburgian nobles negotiate the status of Pomerania in Gartz mediated by Erich von Braunschweig and Heinrich von Braunschweig, no result. Mediator Vivigenz von Eickstedt initiates a meeting of George I, Duke of Pomerania and Joachim I, Elector of Brandenburg in Grimnitz Palace, preliminary treaty signed on 26 August. |
| 25 October 1529 | Treaty of Grimnitz: Treaty of Pyritz confirmed and amended: Duchy of Pomerania becomes an imperial fief, which the dukes of Pomerania have to receive in the presence of Brandenburgian representatives, Brandenburgian succession in Pomerania when the House of Pomerania dies out, Brandenburg retains the title of a Pomeranian duke and merges the Pomeranian coat of arms into the Brandenburgian one. |
| 23 December 1529 | Brandenburg-Pomeranian alliance concluded: mutual assistance against third parties and disobeying subjects, Brandenburg-Pomeranian arbitration court, mutual custodianship for minor members of the ruling houses, trade alliance |

== House of Hohenzollern vs House of Sweden ==
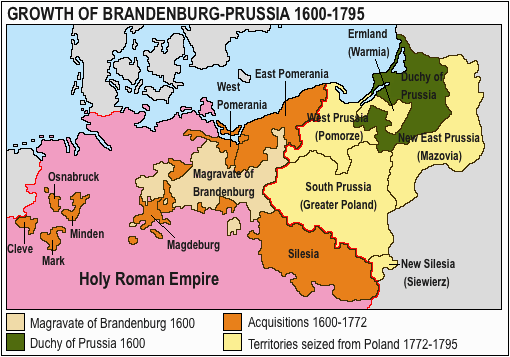
Growth of Brandenburg-Prussia, 1600–1795.

Seven years before the last duke of the House of Pomerania died, which would have led to Brandenburgian succession in the Duchy of Pomerania, Swedish forces had occupied Pomerania in the course of the Thirty Years' War. By the death of Bogislaw XIV, Duke of Pomerania in 1637, Sweden refused to hand over the duchy to Brandenburg. When the war ended, Sweden and Brandenburg agreed in the Peace of Westphalia (1648) and the subsequent Treaty of Stettin (1653) to partition Pomerania by a divide just east of the Oder: Western Pomerania became Swedish Pomerania, while Farther Pomerania became Brandenburgian Pomerania.

Brandenburg, later Brandenburg-Prussia, gained Swedish Pomerania step by step in the following centuries: most of the Swedish strip east of the Oder in the Peace of Saint-Germain-en-Laye that ended the Scanian War in 1679, Swedish Pomerania south of the Peene and east of the Peenestrom rivers with Stettin in the Treaty of Frederiksborg and Treaty of Stockholm that ended the Great Northern War in 1720, and the remainder with Rügen, Stralsund and Greifswald in the Congress of Vienna that ended the Napoleonic Wars in 1815. The former Swedish part was then merged with the former Brandenburgian part and to become the Prussian Province of Pomerania.

Timeline of the Hohenzollern-Sweden conflict
| Date | Event |
|---|---|
| 1627 | Capitulation of Franzburg: Thirty Years' War reaches the Duchy of Pomerania |
| 1630 | Treaty of Stettin: Sweden occupies Pomerania |
| 1637 | death of Bogislaw XIV, Duke of Pomerania, House of Pomerania extinct |
| 1648 | Thirty Years' War ends with the Peace of Westphalia: Brandenburg and Sweden agree to partition Pomerania |
| 1653 | Treaty of Stettin: Sweden and Brandenburg agree on a frontier between Swedish Pomerania and Brandenburgian Pomerania |
| 1659 | Brandenburg and Sweden battle each other in Swedish Pomerania during the Northern Wars |
| 1660 | Peace of Oliva |
| 1675–1678 | Scanian War: Swedish campaign into Brandenburg and defeat at Fehrbellin in 1675. Brandenburgian counteroffensive with Danish support, capture of all of Swedish Pomerania between 1675 and 8 November 1678. |
| 28 June 1679 | Peace of Saint-Germain-en-Laye: most of Swedish Pomerania restored to Sweden, Brandenburg gains a frontier strip east of the Oder |
| 1713–1715 | Brandenburg-Prussia and Denmark occupy Swedish Pomerania during the Great Northern War. Last Swedish defense collapses in 1715 during the Battle of Stralsund |
| 1720 | Treaty of Frederiksborg and Treaty of Stockholm: Swedish Pomerania north of the Peene and west of the Peenestrom rivers restored to Sweden, Brandenburg-Prussia gains the southern part with Stettin and pays 2,000,000 Talers |
| 1757 | Swedish invasion of Brandenburg-Prussian Pomerania, Brandenburg-Prussian invasion of Swedish Pomerania during the Seven Years' War |
| 1806–1815 | Napoleonic Wars: Prussia defeated at Auerstedt in 1806, subsequent seizure of Brandenburg and Pomerania by French forces |
| 1814 | Treaty of Kiel: Sweden cedes Swedish Pomerania to Denmark |
| 1815 | Congress of Vienna: Denmark cedes Swedish Pomerania to Prussia. Province of Pomerania constituted primarily from former Brandenburg-Prussian Pomerania and Swedish Pomerania |

== Sources ==
=== Bibliography ===
- Arnold, Benjamin (2004). Princes and Territories in Medieval Germany. Cambridge University Press. ISBN 0-521-52148-3.
- Barber, Malcolm (2004). The two cities: medieval Europe, 1050-1320 (2 ed.). Routledge. ISBN 0-415-17414-7.
- Buchholz, Werner, ed. (1999). Pommern (in German). Siedler. ISBN 3-88680-272-8.
- Büsch, Otto (1992). Handbuch der preussischen Geschichte Volume 2 (in German). Walter de Gruyter. ISBN 3-11-008322-1.
- Buske, Norbert (1997). Pommern (in German). Schwerin: Helms. ISBN 3-931185-07-9.
- Fuhrmann, Horst (1986). Germany in the High Middle Ages, c. 1050-1200. Cambridge University Press. ISBN 0-521-31980-3.
- Heitz, Gerhard; Rischer, Henning (1995). Geschichte in Daten. Mecklenburg-Vorpommern (in German). Münster-Berlin: Koehler&Amelang. ISBN 3-7338-0195-4.
- Inachin, Kyra (2008). Die Geschichte Pommerns (in German). Rostock: Hinstorff. ISBN 978-3-356-01044-2.
- Kirsch, Kerstin (2004). Slawen und Deutsche in der Uckermark: vergleichende Untersuchungen zur Siedlungsentwicklung vom 11. bis zum 14. Jahrhundert (in German). Franz Steiner Verlag. ISBN 3-515-08604-8.
- Kraus, Andreas (2004). Geschichte Bayerns: Von den Anfängen bis zur Gegenwart (in German) (3 ed.). C.H.Beck. ISBN 3-406-51540-1.
- Krause, Gerhard; Balz, Horst Robert (1993). Müller, Gerhard (ed.). Theologische Realenzyklopädie III (in German). De Gruyter. ISBN 3-11-013898-0.
- Materna, Ingo; Ribbe, Wolfgang; Adamy, Kurt (1995). Brandenburgische Geschichte (in German). Akademie Verlag. ISBN 3-05-002508-5.
- Piskorski, Jan Maria (1999). "Der Staat der ersten Greifenherzöge (bis 1220), pp. 35–58". In Piskorski, Jan Maria (ed.). Pommern im Wandel der Zeiten (in German). Zamek Ksiazat Pomorskich. ISBN 83-906184-8-6.
- Riis, Thomas (1995). Studien zur Geschichte des Ostseeraumes, Band 4 (in German). Verlag Ludwig. ISBN 87-7838-615-2.
- Robinson, I. S. (2003). Henry IV of Germany 1056-1106. Cambridge University Press. ISBN 0-521-54590-0.
- Spindler, Max; Kraus, Andreas (1995). Kraus, Andreas (ed.). Handbuch der bayerischen Geschichte, Volume 3: Geschichte der Oberpfalz und de bayerischen Reichskreises bis zum Ausgang des 18. Jahrhundert (in German) (3 ed.). C.H.Beck. ISBN 3-406-39453-1.
- Zientara, Benedykt; Smolka, Stanisław; Loew, Peter Oliver (2002). Heinrich der bärtige und seine Zeit: Politik und Gesellschaft im mittelalterlichen Schlesien (in German). Oldenbourg Wissenschaftsverlag. ISBN 3-486-56615-6.
