= Treaty of Stettin =

Treaty of Stettin (Szczecin) may refer to:

- Treaty of Stettin (1570), ending the Northern Seven Years' War
- Treaty of Stettin (1630), settling the conditions of Swedish occupation of the Duchy of Pomerania during the Thirty Years' War
- Treaty of Stettin (1653), settling territorial disputes of Brandenburg and Sweden in Pomerania after the Thirty Years' War
- Treaty of Stettin (1715), a Hanoveranian-Prussian alliance during the Great Northern War
