= Treaty of Grimnitz =

1529 treaty between the House of Pomerania and the House of Hohenzollern

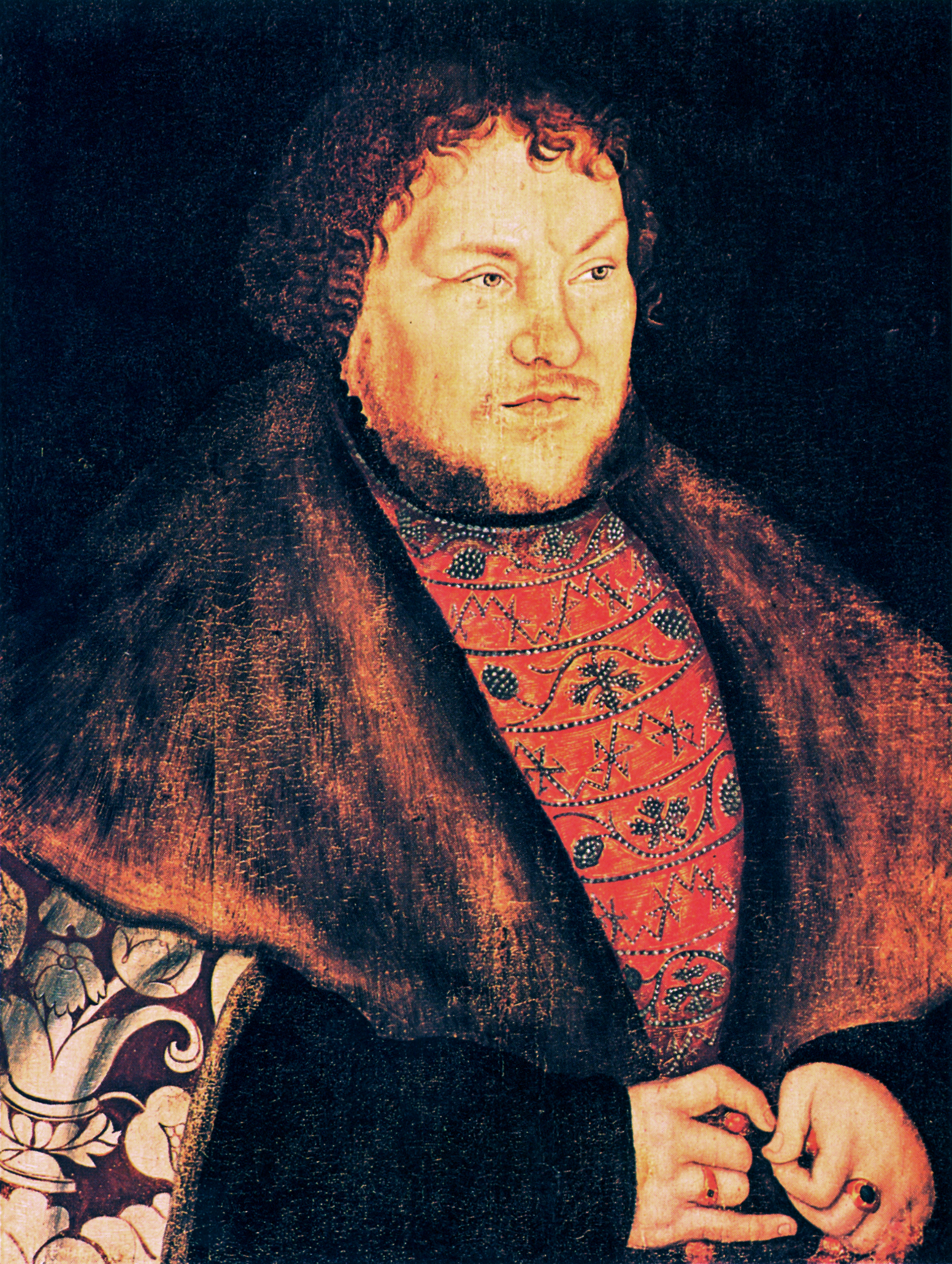
- Joachim I Nestor, Elector of Brandenburg
- Type: Legal status and succession in the Duchy of Pomerania
- Signed: 26 August 1529
- Location: Grimnitz castle
- Effective: 1530
- Condition: Investiture at the Imperial Diet in Augsburg
- Signatories: Joachim I Nestor, Elector of Brandenburg; Barnim IX, Duke of Pomerania; Georg I, Duke of Pomerania
- Parties: House of Hohenzollern; House of Pomerania
- Language: German

The Treaty of Grimnitz (26 August 1529) was the final settlement of a long-standing dispute between the House of Pomerania and the House of Hohenzollern regarding the legal status and succession in the Duchy of Pomerania. It renewed and amended the Treaty of Pyritz of 1493.

With some formal caveats, the House of Pomerania received the Duchy of Pomerania as an immediate imperial fief. In turn the Electors of Brandenburg were granted the right of succession. The treaty was concluded between Joachim I Nestor, Elector of Brandenburg, and the Pomeranian dukes Barnim IX and Georg I in Grimnitz near Eberswalde and was confirmed by Charles V, Holy Roman Emperor, in 1530 at the Imperial Diet in Augsburg.

== Background ==
The Brandenburg-Pomeranian conflict about whether the House of Pomerania had to take the Duchy of Pomerania as a fief from the Electors of Brandenburg or as an immediate fief of the Holy Roman Emperors was temporarily settled in 1493, when John Cicero of the Brandenburgian Hohenzollern, and Bogislaw X of the House of Pomerania, had concluded the Treaty of Pyritz. This treaty discarded the obligation of the Pomeranian dukes to take their duchy as a fief from the Hohenzollern, as ruled in the prior Treaties of Prenzlau (1472/1479), but granted the Hohenzollern the right of succession in case the House of Pomerania became extinct.

In Pyritz, John Cicero had hoped for prompt succession to the then childless Bogislaw X, but when children were born to Bogislaw, he intrigued against him to prevent him from effectively gaining imperial immediacy. Instead of taking sides in the Hohenzollern-Pomeranian dispute, Emperor Charles V invested both houses with the duchy and collected the respective tax from both. When Bogislaw X died 1523, he was succeeded by his sons Barnim IX and George I, who ruled together and continued the dispute with John Cicero's successor, Joachim I Nestor.

After causing some sensation at the Imperial Diet's assemblies, various nobles of the Holy Roman Empire offered to mediate the conflict, and a successful mediation by the Dukes of Brunswick, Eric I and Henry IV, resulted in a treaty signed at Jagdschloß Grimnitz, a hunting seat of the Brandenburgian electors in the Uckermark, north of Eberswalde.

== Provisions ==
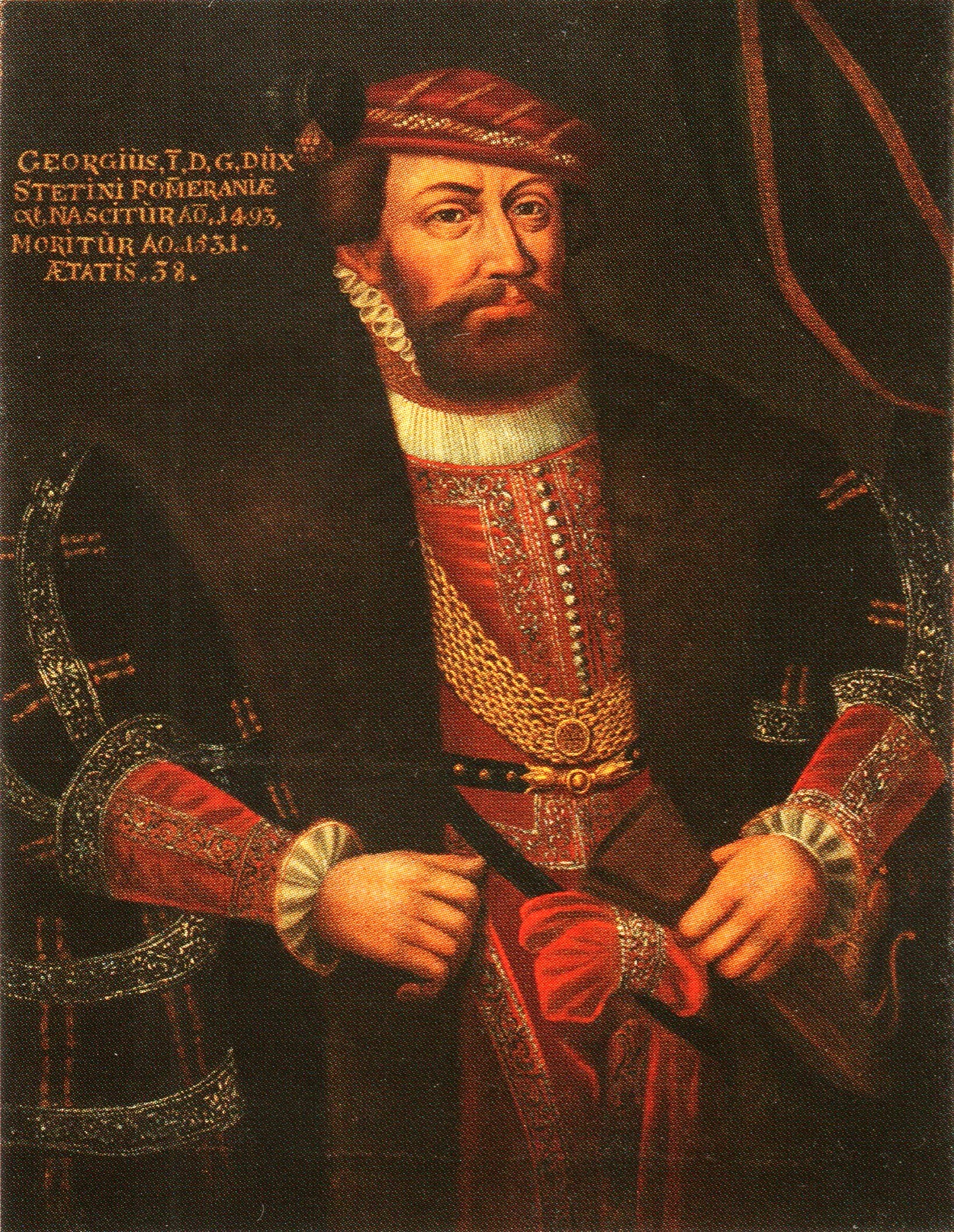
George I of Pomerania

Joachim I Nestor accepted the imperial immediacy of the Duchy of Pomerania. The Pomeranian dukes Barnim IX and George I accepted the Electorate of Brandenburg's right of succession in the Duchy of Pomerania if the House of Pomerania died out.

The Brandenburgers were to be informed prior to any investiture of the Pomeranian dukes, and were granted the rights to touch the flags the Pomeranians received from the Holy Roman Emperor during the ceremonial investiture. The Brandenburgian electors were further granted the right to have an envoy present at ceremonial receptions of allegiance oaths given to the Pomeranian dukes by the Pomeranian nobility. The Brandenburgian electors as vested remainders were also granted the right to be invested with the hereditary option of succession in Pomerania by the emperor. With every subsequent investiture of new dukes, the treaty was to be formally announced and renewed.

In addition, the Brandenburgian electors were granted rights on the title and the coat of arms of the Pomeranian dukes, which they were allowed to show when and wherever the Pomeranian dukes themselves were not present.

== Implementation ==
=== Investiture ===
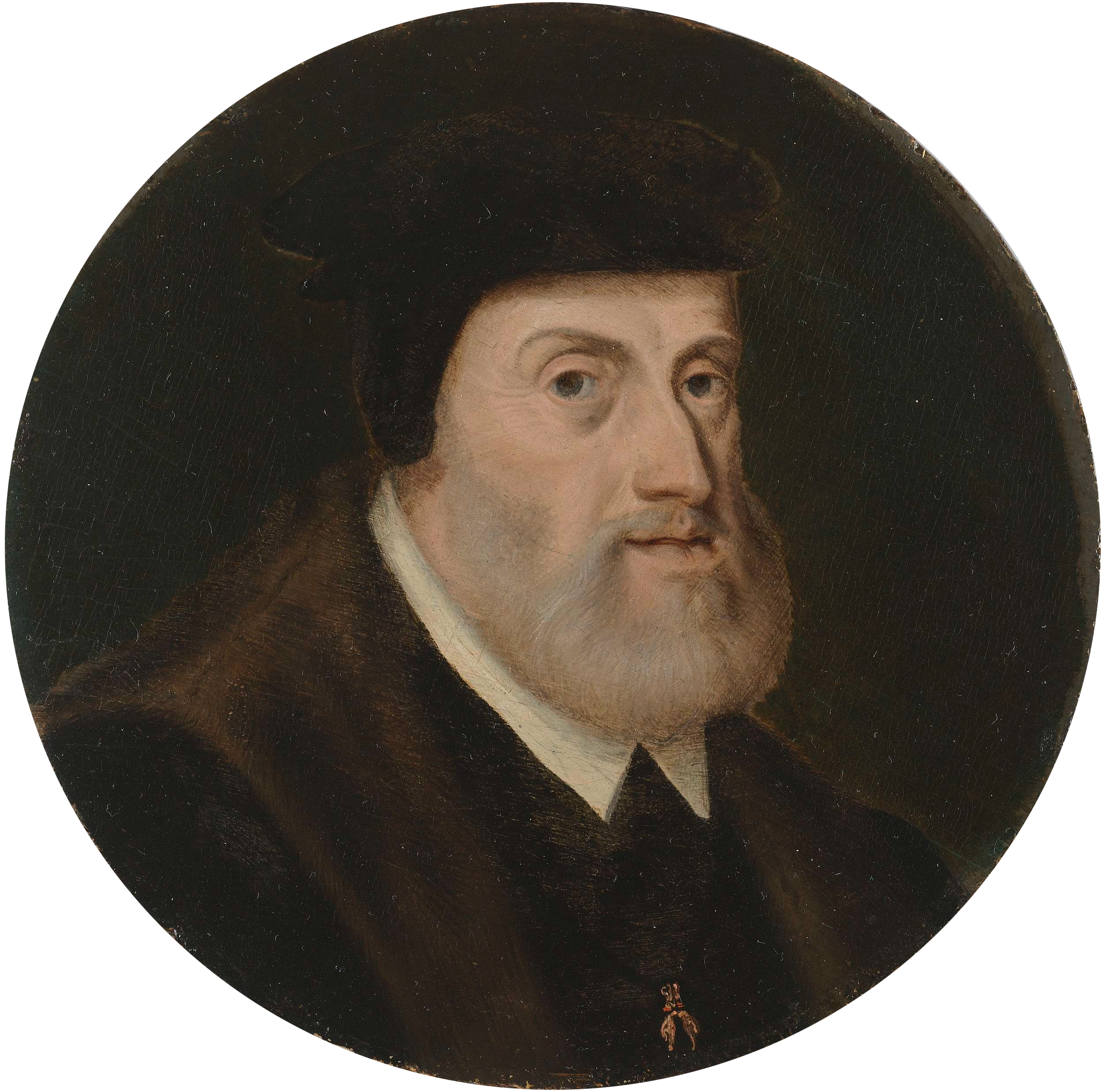
Emperor Charles V

The provisions of the treaty regarding the investiture were put into effect at the Diet of Augsburg in 1530, when the Pomeranian dukes Barnim IX and George I for the first time formally received their duchy as a fief. Emperor Charles V and the prince-electors were the first to enter the Diet, and after they had taken their seats, Joachim I Nestor formally announced that he protested against the investiture of the House of Pomerania, but would be satisfied if he was allowed to participate in the ceremony and touch the Pomeranian flags. The emperor replied that the protest is noted. George, Margrave of Brandenburg-Ansbach, seconded the elector's protest.

Then, the Pomeranian dukes entered the assembly with their entourage carrying the flags of Pomerania, Stettin, Kashubia, Wenden, Barth, Rügen, Wolgast, Usedom and Buckow, presented the flags to the emperor, and on their knees gave him the oath of allegiance. Elector Joachim I Nestor renewed his protest, and when the Pomeranian dukes received their flags from the emperor, he stepped forward and put his hands on each of them. This formalized procedure was thence repeated at every new investiture.

=== Succession ===
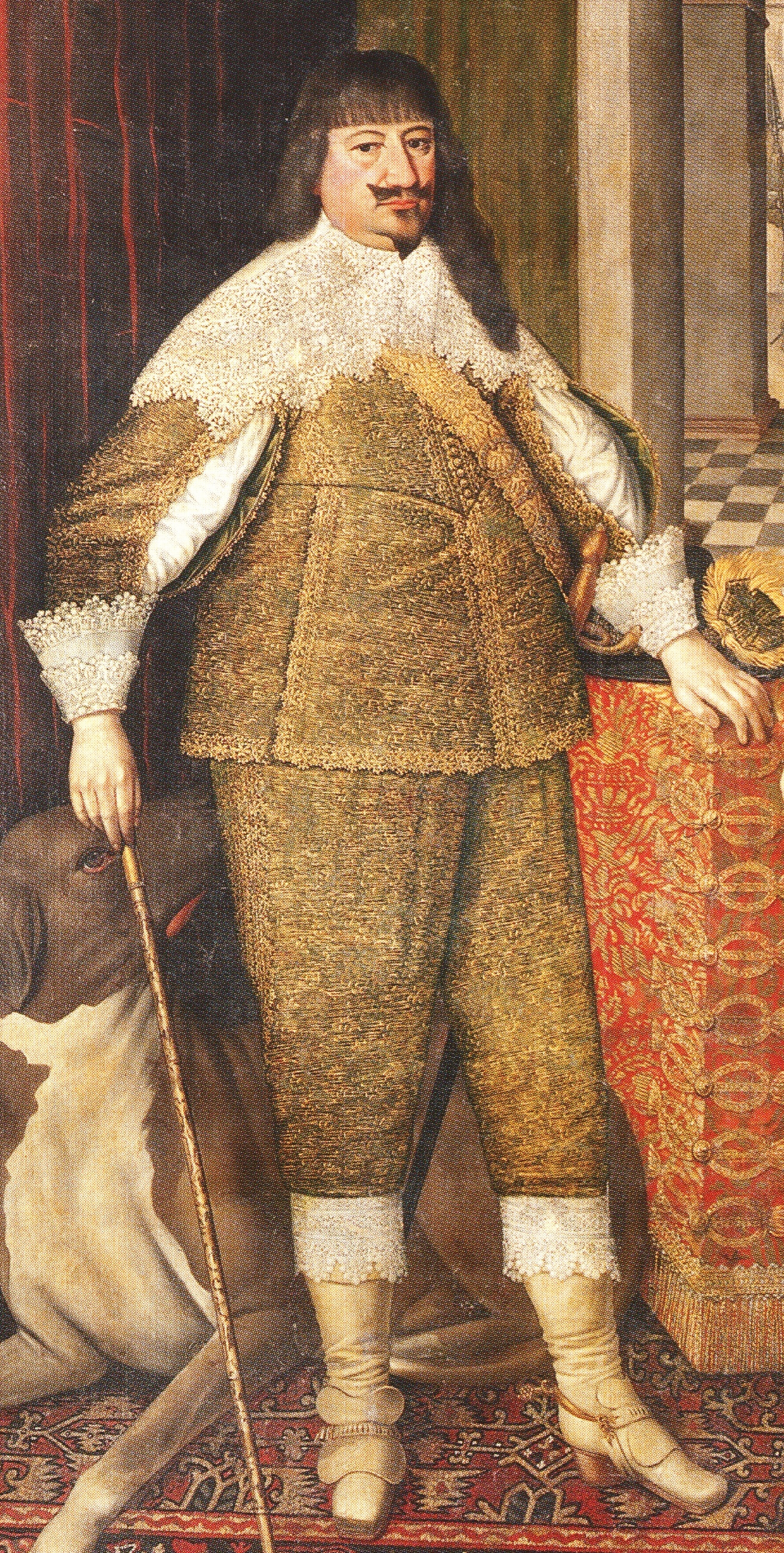
George William, Elector of Brandenburg

The last duke of the House of Pomerania, Bogislaw XIV, died in 1637, during the Thirty Years' War. George William, Elector of Brandenburg, claimed succession based on the inheritance clause in the Treaty of Grimnitz.

However, Bogislaw XIV had concluded an alliance with Sweden in the Treaty of Stettin (1630), and had determined that Sweden should govern the Duchy of Pomerania after his death. Sweden refused to hand over the duchy. An agreement was reached to partition the duchy into a Swedish and a Brandenburgian part in the Peace of Westphalia (1648), which was put into effect in the Treaty of Stettin (1653).

== Sources ==
=== Bibliography ===
- Branig, Hans; Buchholz, Werner (1997). Geschichte Pommerns I: Vom Werden des neuzeitlichen Staates bis zum Verlust der staatlichen Selbständigkeit, 1300-1648 (in German). Böhlau. ISBN 3-412-07189-7.
- Croxton, Derek; Tischer, Anuschka (2002). The Peace of Westphalia: a historical dictionary. Greenwood Press. ISBN 0-313-31004-1.
- Heitz, Gerhard; Rischer, Henning (1995). Geschichte in Daten. Mecklenburg-Vorpommern (in German). Münster-Berlin: Koehler&Amelang. ISBN 3-7338-0195-4.
- Krause, Gerhard; Müller, Gerhard, eds. (1997). Theologische Realenzyklopädie, Band 27 (in German). New York-Berlin: De Gruyter. ISBN 3-11-015435-8.
- Lucht, Dietmar (1996). Pommern: Geschichte, Kultur und Wirtschaft bis zum Beginn des Zweiten Weltkrieges (2 ed.). Verlag Wissenschaft und Politik.
- Materna, Ingo; Ribbe, Wolfgang; Adamy, Kurt (1995). Brandenburgische Geschichte (in German). Akademie Verlag. ISBN 3-05-002508-5.
- Schleinert, Dirk (2007). "Der Codex dipolomaticus Bogislai X". In Scholz, Michael (ed.). Jahrbuch für die Geschichte Mittel- und Ostdeutschlands. Band 53 (in German). Walter de Gruyter. ISBN 3-598-23202-0.
- Schmidt, Roderich (2007). Das historische Pommern: Personen, Orte, Ereignisse. Reihe 5. Band 41 (in German). Böhlau. ISBN 3-412-27805-X.
- Stollberg-Rilinger, Barbara (2008). Des Kaisers alte Kleider: Verfassungsgeschichte und Symbolsprache des Alten Reiches (in German). C.H.Beck. ISBN 3-406-57074-7.
