= Treaty of Saint-Germain-en-Laye =

The Treaty of Saint-Germain may refer to one of a number of treaties signed at Saint-Germain-en-Laye, as follows:

- Treaty of Saint-Germain-en-Laye (1514) - negotiated a French annual pension to England and Henry VIII's continuous control over Tournai.
- Peace of Saint-Germain-en-Laye (1570) - terminated the third phase of the French Wars of Religion
- Treaty of Saint-Germain-en-Laye (1632) - signed March 29, England returned Quebec to France after seizing control in 1629.
- Treaty of Saint-Germain-en-Laye (1679) - established peace between Brandenburg-Prussia and the Franco-Swedish alliance at the end of the Scanian War
- Treaty of Saint-Germain-en-Laye (1919) - treaty between the Allies of World War I and the new republic of Austria
