= Treaty of Soldin =

Treaty of Soldin may refer to

- Treaty of Soldin (1309) between Brandenburg and the Teutonic Order
- Treaty of Soldin (1466) between Brandenburg and Pomerania
