= Partitions of the Duchy of Pomerania =

Duchy in Pomerania

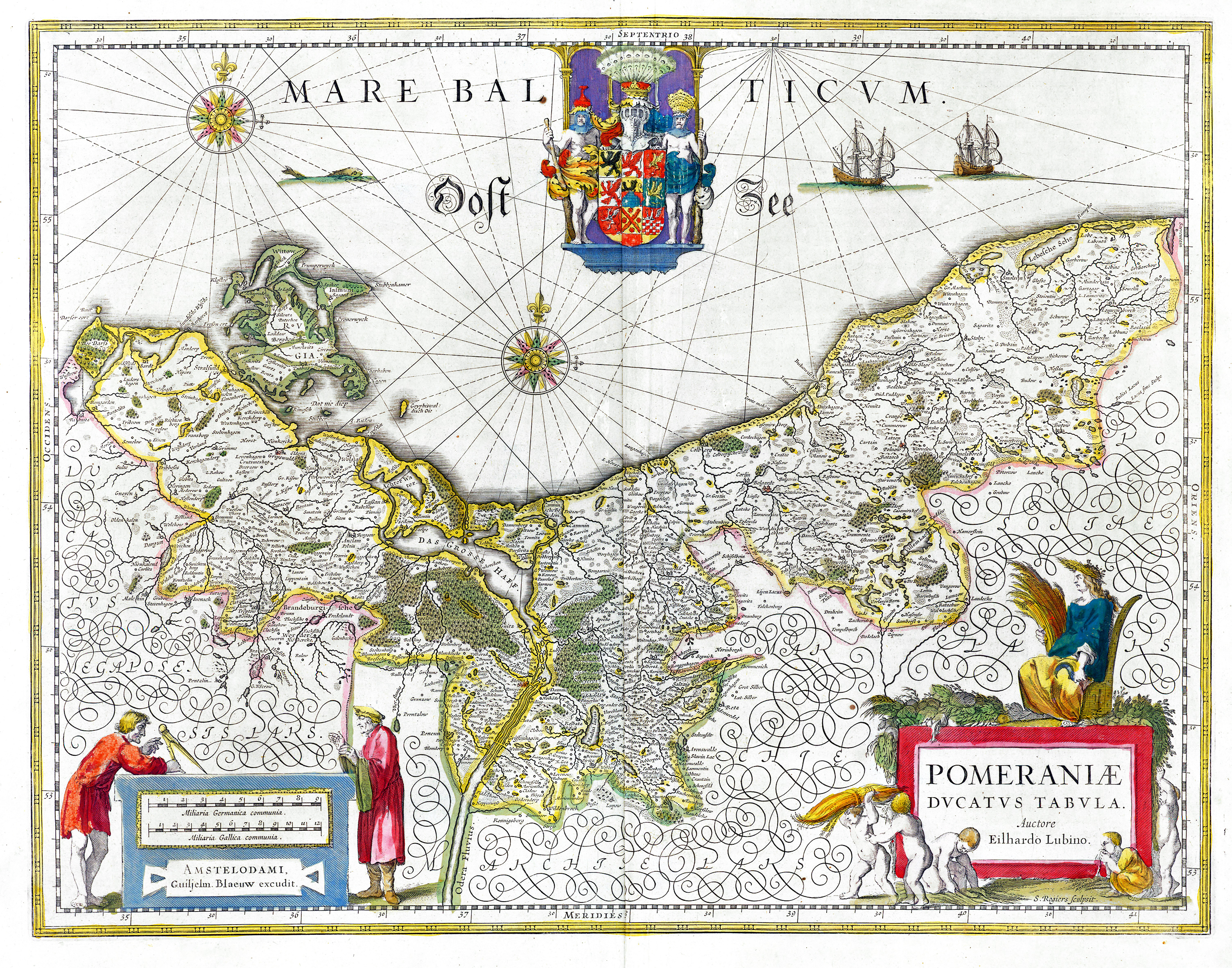
Pomerania in the 17th century

The Duchy of Pomerania was partitioned several times to satisfy the claims of the male members of the ruling House of Pomerania. The partitions were named after the ducal residences: Pomerania-Barth, -Demmin, -Rügenwalde, -Stettin, -Stolp, and -Wolgast. None of the partitions had a hereditary character, the members of the House of Pomerania inherited the duchy in common. The duchy thus continued to exist as a whole despite its division. The only exception was made during a war with the Margraviate of Brandenburg, when in 1338 Barnim III of Pomerania-Stettin was granted his partition as a fief directly from the Holy Roman Emperor, while Pomerania-Wolgast remained under formal Brandenburgian overlordship. However, already in 1348, German king and later emperor Charles IV again granted the Duchy of Pomerania as a whole and the Principality of Rügen as a fief to the dukes of both Pomerania-Stettin and Pomerania-Wolgast, nullifying Brandenburg's claims by granting Imperial immediacy.

== Partitions ==
In 1155, the duchy was partitioned in Pomerania-Demmin and Pomerania-Stettin. With short interruptions, this division lasted until 1264.

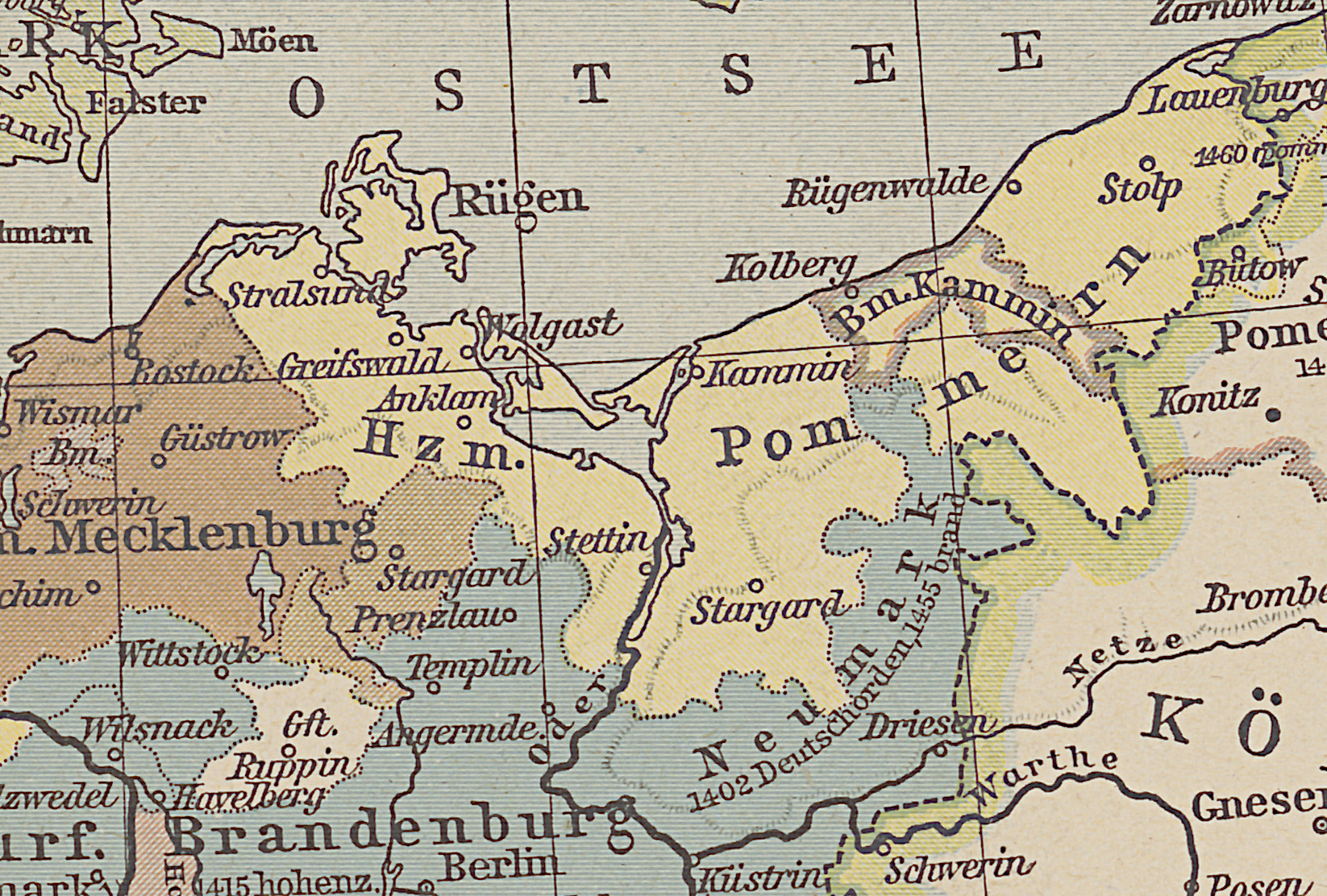
Duchy of Pomerania in 1477

In 1295, the duchy was partitioned in Pomerania-Wolgast and Pomerania-Stettin. In 1368/72, Pomerania-Stolp was split from Pomerania-Wolgast. In 1376, Pomerania-Barth was split from truncated Pomerania-Wolgast. In 1402, Pomerania-Rügenwalde was briefly split from Pomerania-Stolp for three years. In 1451, Pomerania-Barth was for six years merged back into Pomerania-Wolgast. In 1459, Pomerania-Stolp was merged back into Pomerania-Wolgast. In 1464, Pomerania-Stettin was claimed by both Pomerania-Wolgast and Brandenburg, and merged with Pomerania-Wolgast following the Peace of Prenzlau (1472/79). In 1478, Pomerania-Barth was merged back in, temporarily ending the internal division.

In 1532, the duchy was partitioned in a Pomerania-Stettin and a Pomerania-Wolgast of significantly different shape as the earlier divisions of the same names. In 1569, Pomerania-Barth was split from Pomerania-Wolgast and Pomerania-Rügenwalde was split from Pomerania-Stettin, these partitions also differed in shape from earlier partitions with the same name. In 1625, the duchy came under the sole rule of the last duke of the Griffin dynasty, who died during the Thirty Years' War in 1637, when the duchy was under Swedish occupation.

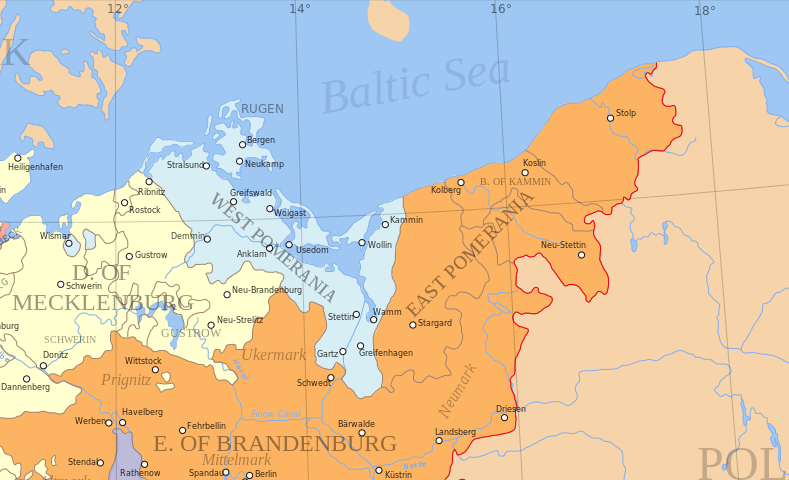
Pomerania after the Treaty of Stettin (1653)

After the war, the Swedish Empire and Brandenburg-Prussia succeeded the Griffin dukes in the Peace of Westphalia (1648) and divided it in the Treaty of Stettin (1653) into a Swedish Pomerania and a Brandenburg-Prussian Pomerania. Both the Swedish and Brandenburgian rulers, in contrast to the Griffin dukes, became hereditary dukes in their respective share. In 1679 and 1720, the Brandenburg-Prussian part was enlarged at the expense of the Swedish share. In 1815, all the former duchy was reorganized in the Prussian province of Pomerania.

== See also ==
- Duchy of Pomerania
- List of Pomeranian duchies and dukes
- Pomerania during the High Middle Ages
- Pomerania during the Late Middle Ages
- Pomerania during the Early Modern Age
