= Tuchel =

Tuchel is a German surname that may refer to the following notable people:

- Günther Tuchel, West German slalom canoeist
- Johannes Tuchel (born 1957), German political scientist
- Thomas Tuchel, (born 1973), German football manager

== See also ==
- Tuchel, the German name for Tuchola, a town in Kuyavian-Pomeranian Voivodeship in northern Poland
