= Treaty of Saint-Germain-en-Laye (1679) =

1679 peace treaty between France and Brandenburg

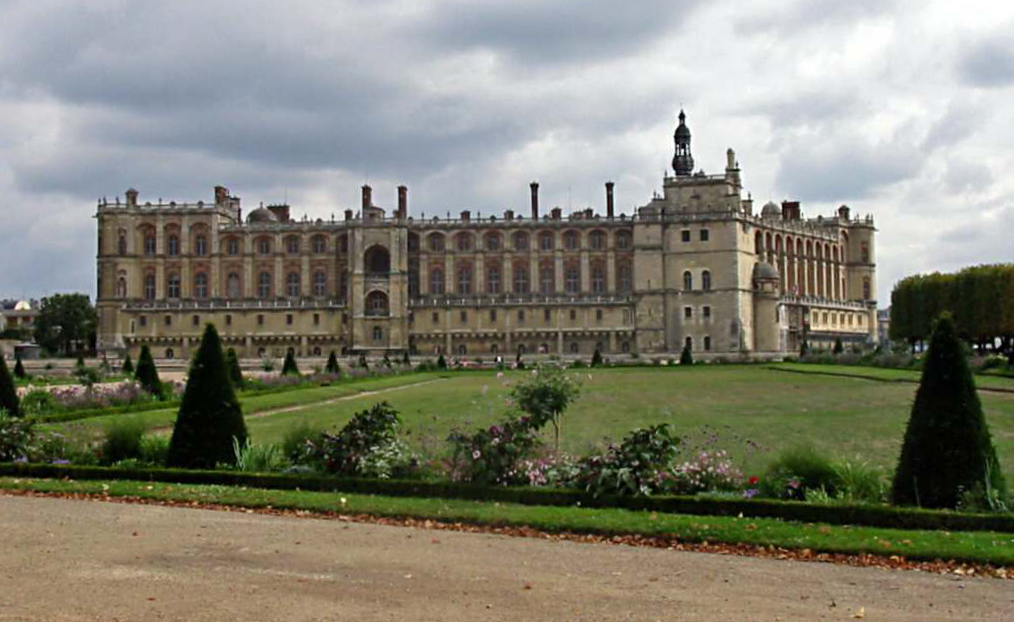
- Château de Saint-Germain-en-Laye
- Type: Peace treaty
- Signed: 29 June 1679
- Location: Saint-Germain-en-Laye, France
- Parties: Charles XI of Sweden; Frederick William I of Brandenburg; Louis XIV of France
- Language: Latin

The Treaty or Peace of Saint-Germain-en-Laye of 19 June (OS) or 29 June (NS) 1679 was a peace treaty between France and the Electorate of Brandenburg. It restored to France's ally Sweden her dominions Bremen-Verden and Swedish Pomerania, lost to Brandenburg in the Scanian War. Sweden ratified the treaty on 28 July 1679.

The treaty is by some considered "the worst political defeat" of Elector Frederick William I. He was forced by France to give away the Swedish portion of what he considered his rightful Pomeranian inheritance, despite having conquered it in a four-year campaign.

== Background ==
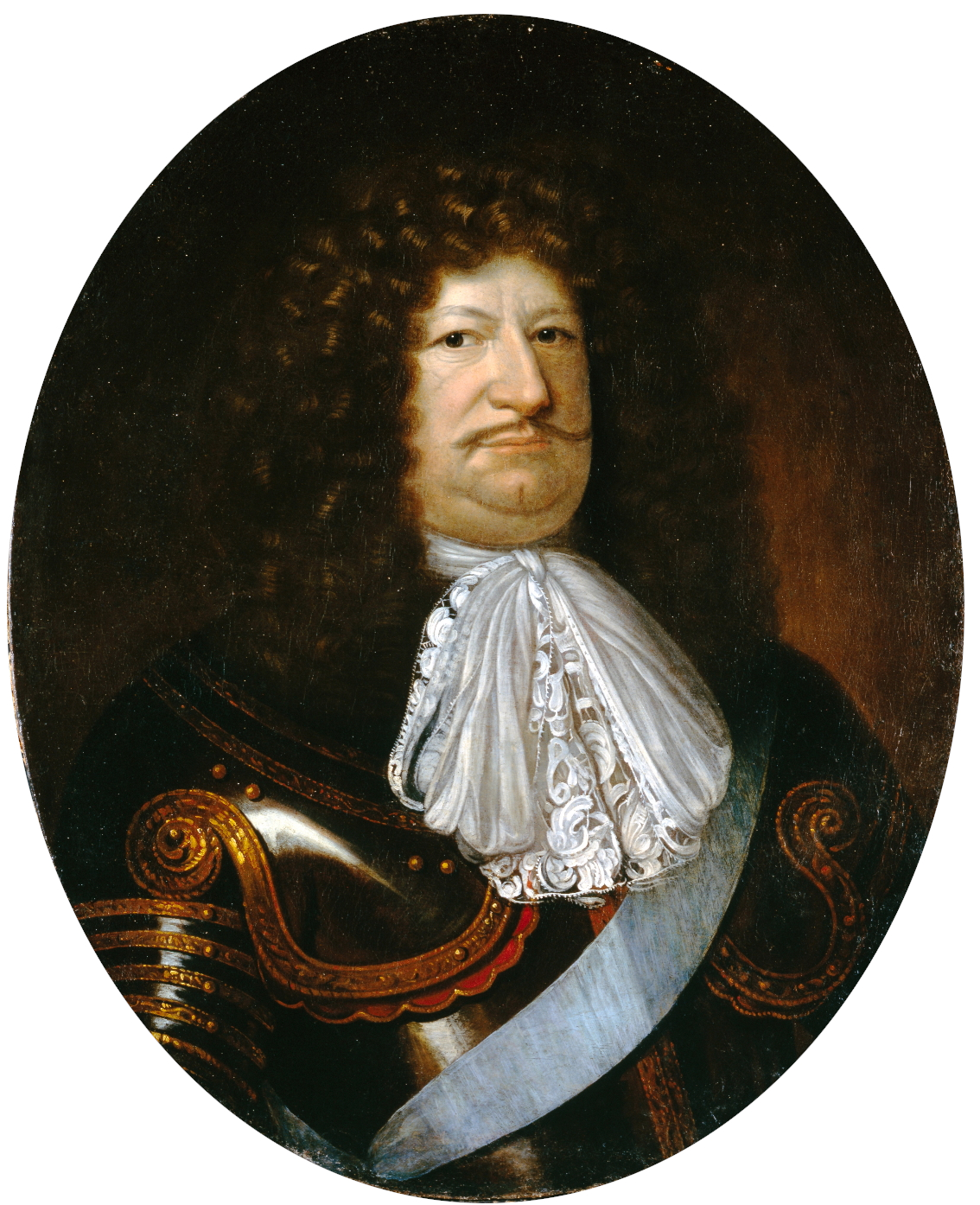
Frederick William I, Elector of Brandenburg

Sweden had entered an alliance with France in April 1672. At this time, Great Britain, the Electorate of Brandenburg, the Netherlands and Denmark were hostile towards Sweden. Leopold I, Holy Roman Emperor entered an alliance with the Netherlands and Spain against France on 30 August 1673, and declared war in early 1674. Subsequently, Frederick William I, Elector of Brandenburg joined the anti-French alliance.

In support of Louis XIV of France, Charles XI of Sweden invaded Brandenburg in 1674, but was decisively defeated in the Battle of Fehrbellin in 1675. Denmark then invaded the province of Scania (Skåne) that had been lost to Sweden in 1658.

During the Scanian War, Brandenburg occupied the Swedish dominions in Northern Germany, Swedish Pomerania (except for Rügen) and Bremen-Verden, also Courland; Denmark occupied Rügen but was defeated in Scania in the battles of Lund (1676) and Landskrona (1677).

After the Treaties of Nijmegen (1678/1679) had ended the Franco-Dutch War, France was able to support Sweden again, and invaded the Brandenburgian Duchy of Cleves on the lower Rhine. Brandenburg, short of troops in the area and deprived of allies by the Nijmegen treaties, had no choice than to settle for peace with France at the expense of her gains from Sweden. Likewise, Denmark-Norway had to conclude the Treaty of Fontainebleau with Sweden in September 1679.

== Negotiations ==
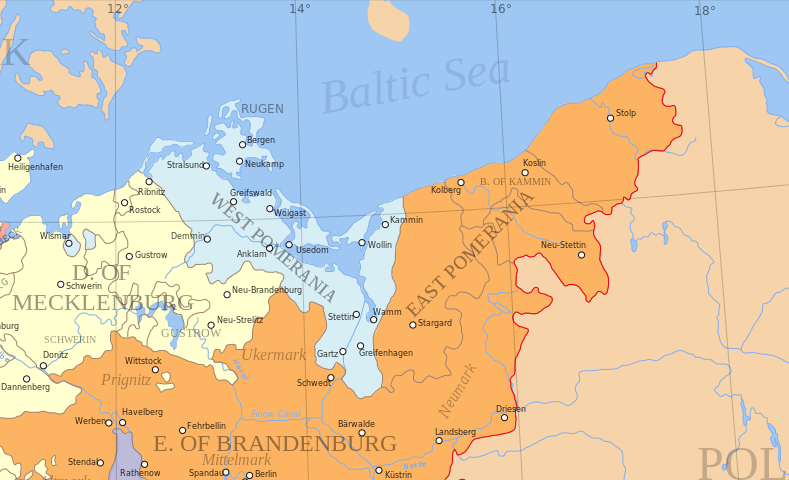
Swedish Pomerania (blue) and the Electorate of Brandenburg with Brandenburgian Pomerania (orange) between the treaties of Stettin (1653) and Saint-Germain (1679)

Brandenburg's ally Leopold I, Holy Roman Emperor had concluded a separate peace with Louis XIV of France in February 1679, confirming the Treaty of Westphalia of 1648 which included the cession of Bremen-Verden and Swedish Pomerania to Sweden. Neither did Leopold I want Frederick William to become a "new king of the Vandals in the Baltics", nor did he want the Brandenburg-Pomeranian conflict to disturb his negotiations with France.

Frederick William I had his diplomats offer France unconditional support, including military support and support against the Holy Roman Emperor, in return for Louis XIV letting him keep Swedish Pomerania. Furthermore, Frederick William I directly offered Sweden "some tons of gold" for Swedish Pomerania, and military support against Denmark-Norway.

Louis XIV however neither had an interest nor a military need to fulfill any Brandenburgian wish. To the contrary, he had a strong interest that Sweden would not lose any territory as a consequence of her alliance and support for France. Frederick William was told that Sweden would lose Stettin "no more than Stockholm", and that "first we [France] will take Lippstadt, Minden will cause us no trouble, then Halberstadt and Magdeburg will fall to us one after the other, and finally we will reach Berlin". With Brandenburgian Cleves occupied and Minden sieged, France also refused another offer of Frederick William to cede his Rhine provinces in return for Swedish Pomerania.

== Provisions ==
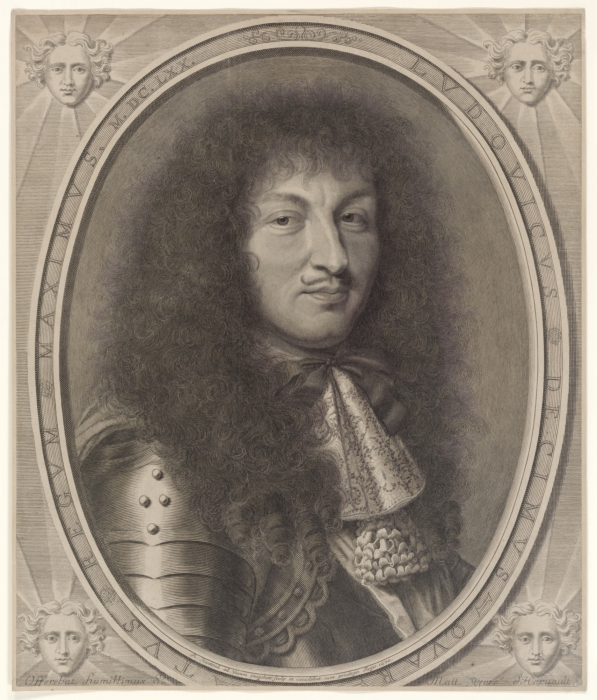
Louis XIV

On 29 June 1679, Frederick William I, Elector of Brandenburg signed the treaty, thereby restoring Bremen-Verden and most of Swedish Pomerania to Sweden in return for a consolation payment from Louis XIV of France and the reversion of East Frisia. The French payment to Brandenburg was fixed at 300,000 talers, to be paid within the following two years. France subsequently managed to make Brandenburg accept this sum also to settle 900,000 talers of French debts.

The Electorate of Brandenburg further gained the former Swedish eastern bank of the Oder river except for Gollnow and Damm. Gollnow was pawned to Brandenburg for 50,000 talers, bailed out by Sweden in 1693. Swedish Pomerania was to be cleared of Brandenburgian occupation forces within three months.

The treaty also contained a paragraph that forbade Dutch forces to garrison in the Duchy of Cleves.

== Implementation and aftermath ==
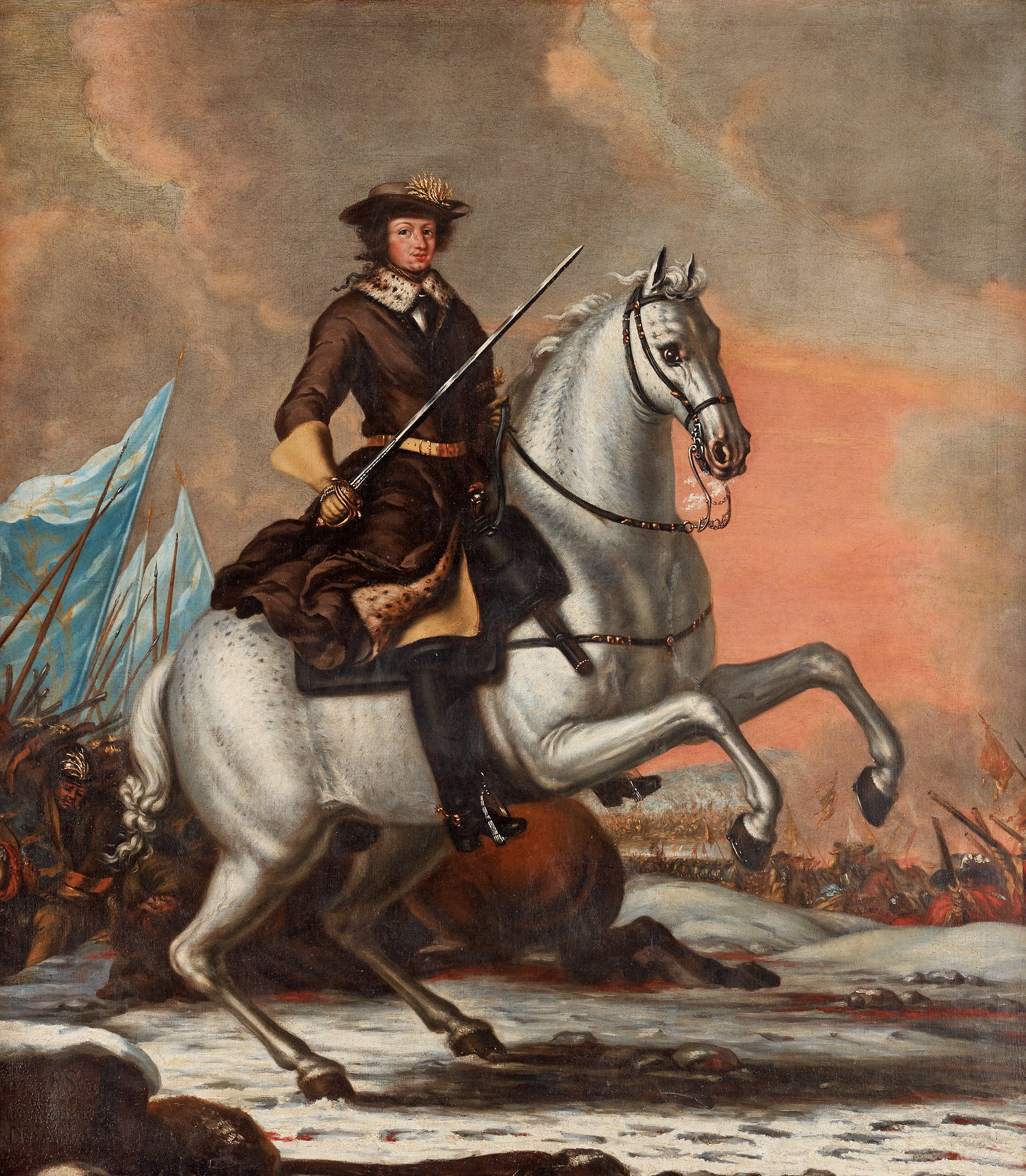
Charles XI of Sweden

Stettin was restored to Sweden as the last Brandenburgian stronghold in December 1679. Denmark, who during the Scanian War had occupied Rügen, concluded a separate treaty with Sweden: In the Treaty of Lund of 26 September 1679, Denmark assured to return Rügen to Sweden by 20 October.

Still in 1679, Brandenburg concluded a secret alliance with France: Brandenburg's sovereignty was to be respected by France for ten years and an annual 100,000 livres were paid in return for France's right for free passage through Brandenburgian territory. This alliance was in part due to disappointment of the Hohenzollern Elector of Brandenburg with the Habsburg Holy Roman Emperor, who had approved of the treaty and opposed a strong Brandenburg. Aware of France' expansionism and what he called the "French yoke", Frederick William I nevertheless concluded that:

"only the protection of God and the power of the [French] King can bring us security"

and that the Empire and the Emperor:

"were the first to leave us defenceless before our enemies".

However, Brandenburg secretly started to form new, anti-French alliances in 1685, after the Edict of Fontainebleau.

== See also ==
- Brandenburg-Pomeranian conflict
- Peace of Westphalia
- Treaty of Stettin (1653)
- Swedish Pomerania
- Bremen-Verden
- Scanian War

== Sources ==
- Arnold-Baker, Charles (2001). The companion to British history (2 ed.). Routledge. ISBN 0-415-18583-1.
- Asmus, Ivo (2003). "Das Testament des Grafen - Die pommerschen Besitzungen Carl Gustav Wrangels nach Tod, förmyndarräfst und Reduktion". In Asmus, Ivo; Droste, Heiko; Olesen, Jens E. (eds.). Gemeinsame Bekannte: Schweden und Deutschland in der Frühen Neuzeit (in German). Berlin-Hamburg-Münster: LIT Verlag. ISBN 3-8258-7150-9.
- Clark, Christopher M. (2006). Iron kingdom: the rise and downfall of Prussia, 1600-1947. Harvard University Press. ISBN 0-674-02385-4.
- Fiedler, Beate-Christine (2003). "Esaias v. Pufendorf (1628-1689). Diplomat in Europa und Kanzler in den schwedischen Herzogtümern Bremen und Verden - Eine biographische Skizze". In Asmus, Ivo; Droste, Heiko; Olesen, Jens E. (eds.). Gemeinsame Bekannte: Schweden und Deutschland in der Frühen Neuzeit (in German). Berlin-Hamburg-Münster: LIT Verlag. ISBN 3-8258-7150-9.
- Heitz, Gerhard; Rischer, Henning (1995). Geschichte in Daten. Mecklenburg-Vorpommern (in German). Münster-Berlin: Koehler&Amelang. ISBN 3-7338-0195-4.
- Holborn, Hajo (1982). A History of Modern Germany: 1648-1840. Princeton University Press. ISBN 0-691-00796-9.
- MacKay, Derek (1997). "Small power diplomacy in the age of Louis XIV". In Oresko, Robert; Gibbs, G. C.; Scott, Hamish M. (eds.). Royal and republican sovereignty in early modern Europe. Cambridge University Press. ISBN 0-521-41910-7.
- Shennan, Margaret (1995). The rise of Brandenburg-Prussia. Routledge. ISBN 0-415-12938-9.
- Stearns, Peter N.; Langer, William Leonard, eds. (2001). The Encyclopedia of world history: ancient, medieval, and modern, chronologically arranged (6 ed.). Houghton Mifflin Harcourt. ISBN 0-395-65237-5.
