= Treaty of Stettin (1715) =

1715 alliance between Hanover and Prussia

Coordinates: 53°25′45.4″N 14°33′6.6″E

The Treaty of Stettin was concluded on 28 April 1715, during the Great Northern War, in the Prussian camp at Stettin (now Szczecin) between Hanover and Prussia. The treaty allied George I of Great Britain, as Elector of Hanover, with the Kingdom of Prussia against the Swedish Empire. In the years following the establishment of this treaty, Sweden was forced out of it holdings south of the Baltic Sea, ultimately leading to Sweden's defeat in 1721, at the conclusion of the Great Northern War.

== See also ==
- Treaty of Stettin (1570)
- Treaty of Stettin (1630)
- Treaty of Stettin (1653)
