= Treaty of Soldin (1466) =

1466 treaty between Brandenburg and Pomerania

The Treaty of Soldin (German: Vertrag von Soldin) was signed on 21 January 1466 at Soldin (now Myślibórz) by the Brandenburgian elector Frederick II and the Pomeranian dukes Eric II and Wartislaw X. It was mediated by the town of Stettin (now Szczecin). The treaty temporarily settled a conflict about the succession of Otto III, Duke of Pomerania, who had died without issue: Emperor Frederick III, elector Frederick II as well as Eric II and Wartislaw X of Pomerania claimed to be the rightful heir of Otto's share of the Duchy of Pomerania.

The Brandenburgian elector and the Pomeranian dukes bypassed the emperor's claims, and settled for a solution where the Pomeranian dukes took the Duchy of Pomerania, including Otto's as well as their own shares, as a fief of the Electorate of Brandenburg. The implementation of the treaty failed due to the refusal of parts of the Pomeranian nobility and the town of Stettin to obey to the treaty's terms. Neither did the Pomeranian dukes enforce the treaty, and successfully intrigued against it at the emperor's court. Brandenburg tried to enforce the treaty militarily, yet initially with limited success. Frederick III, Holy Roman Emperor declared the treaty null and void in 1469, but confirmed Brandenburg's claims in 1470. The treaty of Soldin was superseded by the Second Peace of Prenzlau in May 1472, that ended the war and confirmed Pomerania as a Brandenburgian fief.

== Background ==
Brandenburg and the Duchy of Pomerania were part of a long-standing dispute regarding the status of the latter. While Brandenburg regarded Pomerania to be her legal fief, the Pomeranian dukes rejected such claims. Both sides were at times successful in convincing the Holy Roman Emperor of their respective view, and frequently, the conflict resulted in warfare. The most recent of these armed conflicts was fought between 1444 and 1448 about territory in the Uckermark, claimed by both Pomerania and Brandenburg. The First Peace of Prenzlau (1448) had ended this war by dividing the area in a Brandenburgian and a Pomeranian part. The Duchy of Pomerania was itself internally divided between various members of the House of Pomerania, each of whom ruled a part ("Teilherzogtum") of it named after its respective primary residence. In 1455, Frederick II, Elector of Brandenburg had bought back the Neumark from the Teutonic Order State, and was searching for an access to the Baltic Sea for his land-locked electorate.

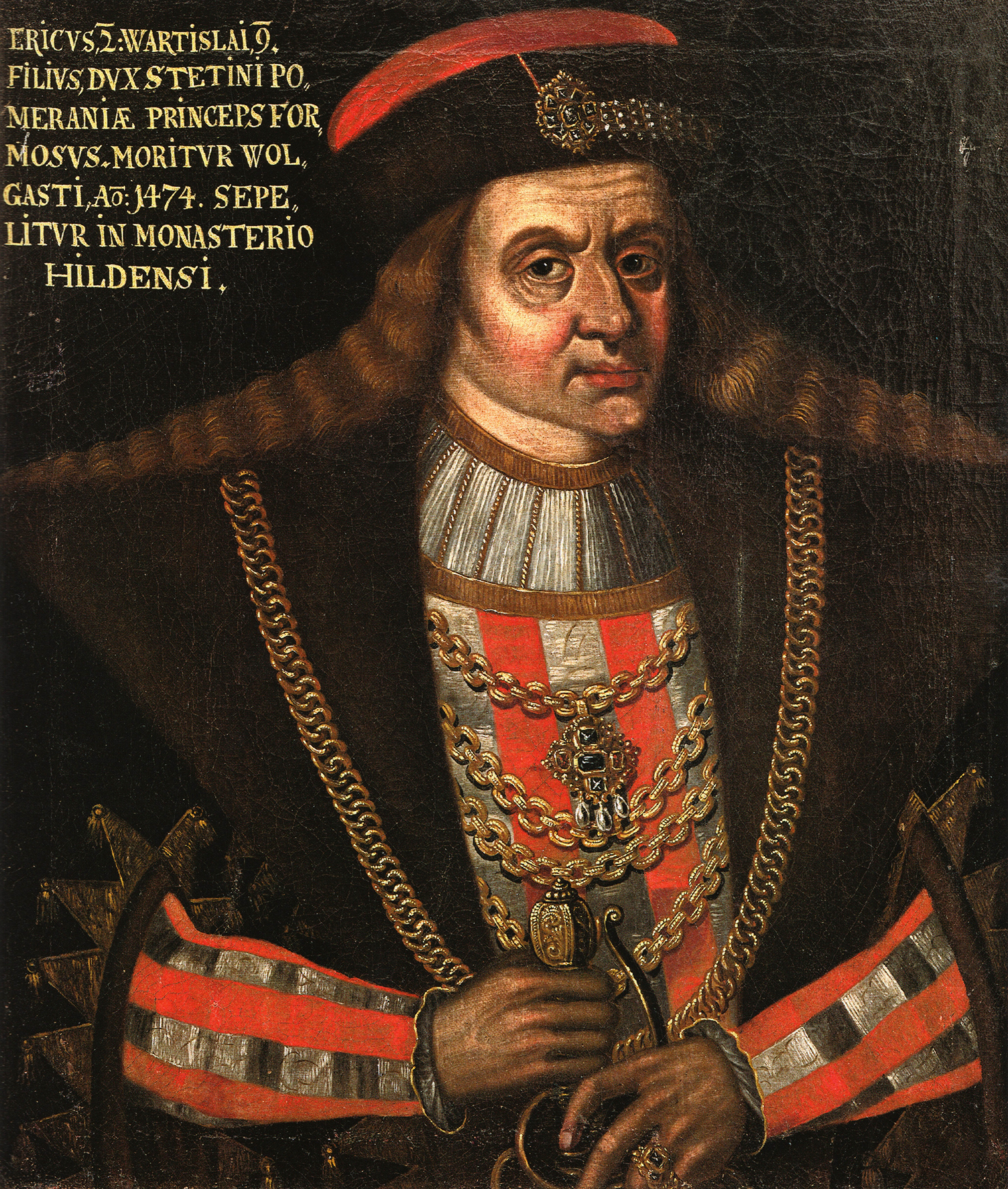
Eric II of Pomerania

During the 1450s, the Pomeranian dukes faced fierce opposition of the Hanseatic towns within their duchy. Stralsund refused to accept the dukes as overlords at all in 1451, and reconciled with the dukes only in a peace of 12 July 1454. In 1457, burghers of Stralsund and Greifswald assaulted duke Eric II and his entourage – Eric barely escaped. Also in 1457, the Hanseatic towns of Stralsund, Greifswald, Demmin and Anklam conclude an alliance directed against the Pomeranian dukes.

In 1459, Frederick III, Holy Roman Emperor, renounced all freedoms previously granted by the emperors to the Pomeranian dukes. The same year, Eric of Pomerania's death caused a conflict between the remaining dukes Eric II, Wartislaw X and Otto III about Eric's heritage – Eric II claimed all for himself. This led Otto III and Wartislaw X to ally with the elector of Brandenburg on 6 September 1459, and with Denmark on 27 July 1462, both alliances were directed against Eric II. The dukes however reconciled in 1463.

An epidemic wave of the Black Death had reached Pomerania in 1451. Many members of the House of Pomerania fell victim to this epidemic, including Otto III of Pomerania-Stettin, who died without issue on 10 September 1464. The remaining dukes Wartislaw X and Erich II on one side, and the Brandenburgian elector on the other side both claim Otto's Teilherzogtum. Negotiations in Prenzlau on 13 January 1465 ended without a result. Frederick III, Holy Roman Emperor initially rejected both the Pomeranian and the Brandenburgian claims, and considered Pomerania-Stettin as his personal property. On 21 March, the emperor drafted a document confirming Brandenburg's claim, yet this title was kept in Nuremberg and had to be bailed out with 37,000 gulden. This did not happen, as the elector could not afford to pay this sum. Brandenburgian-Pomeranian negotiations in April and May in Prenzlau failed.

== Provisions ==
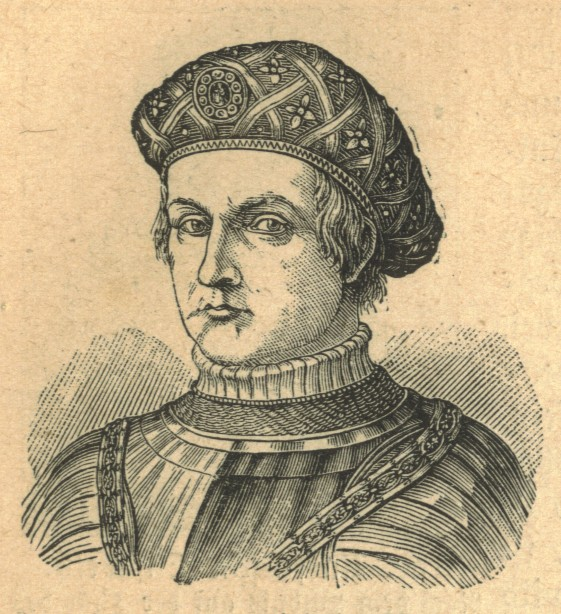
Frederick II "Eisenzahn" ("Iron tooth") of Brandenburg

The treaty included the following provisions:

- The Duchy of Pomerania becomes a fief of the Electorate of Brandenburg. Erich II and Wartislaw X pledge allegiance to the elector. This does not affect the oaths of the Pomeranian nobility, who had to pledge allegiance to both the Pomeranian dukes and the Brandenburgian elector. The elector of Brandenburg has to justify this action before the Holy Roman Emperor. Allegiance may only to be pledged after previous mutual consultations.
- The Pomeranian dukes continue to receive all income from their duchy.
- Fiefs inside the duchy are to be handed out only by the Pomeranian dukes and the Brandenburgian elector in common.
- The Brandenburgian elector is obliged to protect the Duchy of Pomerania. Furthermore, Brandenburg and Pomerania enter a defensive alliance.
- The Pomeranian dukes are obliged to not unduly burden the Pomeranian nobility, and guarantee them certain freedoms.
- Brandenburg and Pomerania allow free trade and traffic.

== Failed implementation ==
On 10 March 1466, Wartislaw X of Pomerania and Frederick II of Brandenburg met in Gartz (Oder) to put the Pomeranian nobility under oath. However, they had to cancel the ceremony due to insufficient attention. On 26 April, Stettin mailed the elector that it refused to pledge allegiance. The Pomeranian delegate at the emperor's court, Jaroslaw Barnekow, pursued the cassation of the elector's title since the summer, and was successful on 14 October when the emperor forbade the Pomeranian dukes to take the Duchy of Pomerania as a fief without his approval. The respective imperial note arrived in Pomerania in February 1467.

== Aftermath ==
=== War between Brandenburg and Pomerania ===
On 8 May 1467, Mecklenburg and the Electorate of Saxony admonished the Pomeranian dukes to obey by the treaty and threatened them with an economical boycott, while the Hanseatic League, especially Lübeck, endorsed Stettin's refusal to pledge allegiance to Brandenburg. On 2 May 1468, Brandenburg sent a note to Stettin insisting on the implementation of the treaty and threatened with war, which eventually broke out in mid-July. Forces of Brandenburgian ally Mecklenburg crossed the Tollense river into Vorpommern, while Brandenburgian forces attacked from the South. In the following battles, Brandenburg sacked Löcknitz and Gartz (Oder) in July, and Mecklenburg sacked Altentreptow in early August. After further Brandenburgian and Mecklenburgian gains, Stralsund and Greifswald mediated a truce in late August.

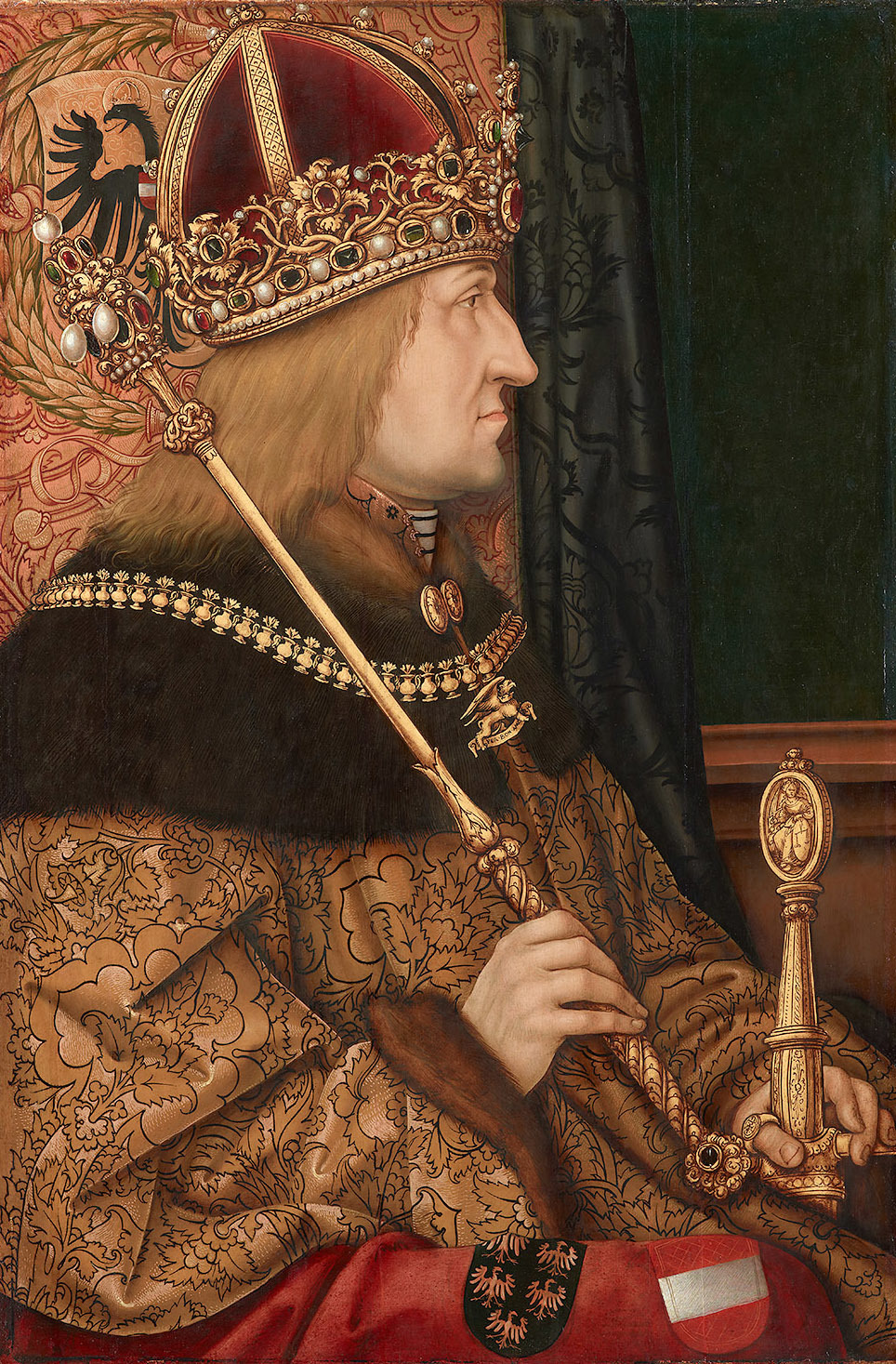
Frederick III, Holy Roman Emperor

The truce however was not obeyed. Pomeranian forces invaded Brandenburgian territory and re-took Altentreptow by 8 September 1467. On 21 September, peace negotiations failed, and Meckenburg renewed her alliance with Brandenburg. In October, Pomeranian forces sacked Bahn and stormed Gartz, yet were repelled from the latter. On 12 December, the Pomeranian delegates Jaroslaw Barnekow, Bernd Broke and Klaus Goldbeck offered a peace at Prenzlau, but Brandenburg refused due to ongoing attacks by the Pomeranian forces. Negotiations at Prenzlau continued, and on 8 January 1469, the Pomeranian dukes Eric II and Wartislaw X swore in public on Prenzlau's marketplace to obey the treaty of Soldin, and that the duchy would pledge allegiance within the next eight days. On 15 January, some Pomeranian nobles actually gave the oath to the elector, but Stettin openly refused again in May, and was again backed by the Hanseatic League. The Pomeranian dukes meanwhile intrigued with the emperor to declare the Soldin treaty void.

On 14 July 1469, the emperor issued a decree that nullified the treaty of Soldin, confirmed Pomerania's imperial immediacy and forbade Brandenburgian actions against the duchy. On the same day, Pomeranian forces invaded the Brandenburgian Neumark, but were defeated in the Battle of Schivelbein. On 25 July, the elector mounted a counter-offensive, reaching Ueckermünde on 30 July. The town, supported by Stralsund and Stettin, was besieged by combined Brandenburgian and Mecklenburgian forces until 10 August. On 21 October 1469, Pomerania and Mecklenburg concluded a peace treaty, and obliged themselves to maintain neutrality in case one of them was at war with Brandenburg. In May 1470, Eric II of Pomerania again invaded the Neumark.

=== Second Peace of Prenzlau ===
On 12 December 1470, the emperor confirmed the Brandenburgian claim to Pomerania-Stettin. Furthermore, he addressed the Polish king on 9 January 1470 to support Brandenburg against Pomerania. On 6 August, the emperor forbade the Pomeranian dukes to hinder Brandenburg's appropriation of Pomerania-Stettin, and ordered the nobles to pledge allegiance to the elector. On 16 September, Pomerania and Brandenburg agree on a truce in Mescherin, scheduled until 24 June 1472. The Second Peace of Prenzlau, concluded between Brandenburg and Pomerania on 30 May 1472, finally settled the dispute in Brandenburg's favour: Brandenburg received Pomerania-Stettin, and Pomerania-Wolgast became a Brandenburgian fief.

== Sources ==
=== Bibliography ===
- Buchholz, Werner, ed. (2002). Pommern (in German). Siedler. ISBN 3-88680-780-0.
- Heitz, Gerhard; Rischer, Henning (1995). Geschichte in Daten. Mecklenburg-Vorpommern (in German). Münster-Berlin: Koehler&Amelang. ISBN 3-7338-0195-4.
- Kroll, Frank-Lothar (2006). Preußens Herrscher: Von den ersten Hohenzollern bis Wilhelm II. C.H.Beck. ISBN 3-406-54129-1.
- Materna, Ingo; Ribbe, Wolfgang; Adamy, Kurt (1995). Brandenburgische Geschichte. Akademie Verlag. ISBN 3-05-002508-5.
