= Treaty of Stettin (1653) =

1653 treaty between Brandenburg and Sweden

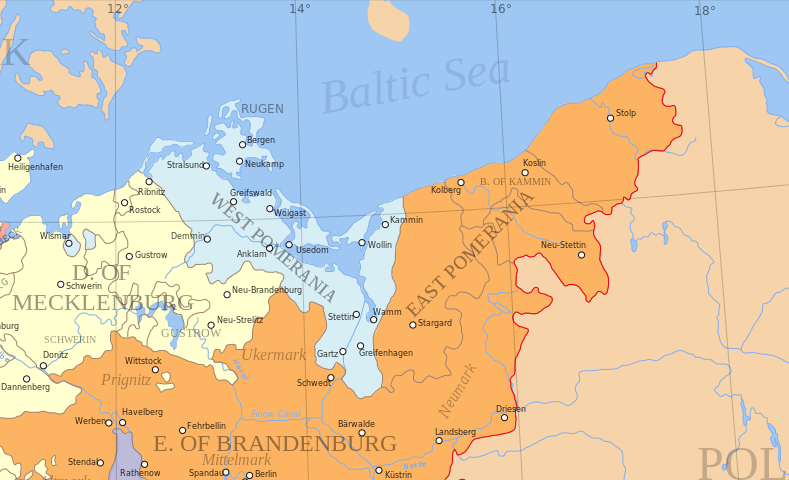
The former Duchy of Pomerania (center) partitioned between the Swedish Empire and Brandenburg after the Treaty of Stettin in 1653. Swedish Pomerania ("West Pomerania") is indicated in blue, Brandenburgian Pomerania ("East Pomerania") is shown in orange.

The Treaty of Stettin (German: Grenzrezeß von Stettin) of 4 May 1653 settled a dispute between Brandenburg and Sweden, who both claimed succession in the Duchy of Pomerania after the extinction of the local House of Pomerania during the Thirty Years' War. Brandenburg's claims were based on the Treaty of Grimnitz (1529), while Sweden's claims were based on the Treaty of Stettin (1630). The parties had agreed on a partition of the Swedish-held duchy in the Peace of Westphalia (1648), and with the Treaty of Stettin determined the actual border between the partitions. Western Pomerania became Swedish Pomerania, Farther Pomerania became Brandenburgian Pomerania.

== Background ==
Swedish Pomerania (Vorpommern) within the Swedish Empire (green). The dates indicate the year Sweden acquired and lost (in brackets) the respective territories.

During the war, Sweden had occupied the Duchy of Pomerania in 1630. The last Griffin duke Bogislaw XIV died in 1637, his duchy was supposed to be inherited by Brandenburg, who based her claims on in the Treaty of Grimnitz.

This however was hindered by the Swedish presence. The 1648 Peace of Westphalia ended the war, and Pomerania was to be partitioned between Brandenburg and Sweden. The 1650 Treaty of Nuremberg roughly defined the areas that should be under control of Sweden and Brandenburg, respectively.

== The treaty ==
The precise border was drawn in the 1653 Treaty of Stettin, partitioning the Duchy of Pomerania along a line running east of the Oder river. The areas west of this line (Vorpommern, including Stettin) stayed with Sweden and hence were referred to as Swedish Pomerania. The areas east of the line (Farther Pomerania) were to be transferred to Brandenburg. Half of the customs revenues of the Farther Pomeranian towns were the prerogative of Sweden even after her withdrawal.

The border was determined to run north from the Brandenburg-Pomeranian border, leaving Komturei Greifenhagen and Komturei Wildenbruch with Sweden, to run towards Woltiner See between Wierow and Schönfeld, from there run north between Damerow and Greifenhagen, Klebow and Brünken, Hökendorf and Buchholz, then meet the Plöne river, from there run through the Friedrichswalde forest, cross the Ihna, circumvent Gollnow and Hohenbrück (with Sweden), meet the Martinscher See, circumvent Kammin, Tribsow and Fritzow (with Sweden) and meet the Baltic Sea between Raddack and Lüchentin.

On 19 July 1653, the first Landtag in Brandenburgian Pomerania assembled in Stargard. In 1654, the Swedish withdrawal from Farther Pomerania was complete.

== Notability in European context ==
The treaty consolidated Sweden's control of the Oder estituary, adding to Sweden's gain of control at the lower Weser and Elbe rivers from the Peace of Westphalia. Thus, the treaty consolidated Sweden's control over the mouths of all major German rivers, except for the Rhine. Swedish Pomerania became the largest territorial foothold of Sweden in Germany.

== Border revisions of 1679 and 1720 ==
The border as agreed on in the treaty was slightly shifted westwards after the Scanian War in the Treaty of Saint-Germain-en-Laye (1679), and shifted far west to the Peene and Peenestrom rivers after the Great Northern War in the Treaty of Stockholm (1720).

== See also ==
- Treaty of Stettin (1570)
- Treaty of Stettin (1630)
- Treaty of Stettin (1715)

== Sources ==
=== Bibliography ===
- Croxton, Derek; Tischer, Anuschka (2002). The Peace of Westphalia: a historical dictionary. Greenwood Press. ISBN 0-313-31004-1.
- Heitz, Gerhard; Rischer, Henning (1995). Geschichte in Daten. Mecklenburg-Vorpommern (in German). Münster-Berlin: Koehler&Amelang. ISBN 3-7338-0195-4.
- Shennan, Margaret (1995). The Rise of Brandenburg-Prussia. ISBN 0-415-12938-9.
