= Treaty of Prenzlau =

15th century treaties between Brandenburg and Pomerania

Treaty of Prenzlau or Peace of Prenzlau (German: Vertrag von Prenzlau, Frieden von Prenzlau, Vergleich von Prenzlau) may refer to several treaties during a series of wars between the Margraviate of Brandenburg and the Duchy of Pomerania fought for control of Pomerania-Stettin, and possession of the Uckermark in the 15th century. The First Peace of Prenzlau ended a war fought between 1445 and 1448, while the Second Peace of Prenzlau ended a war fought between 1466 and 1468. In older documents, Prenzlau may be spelled Prenzlow, which was the common spelling during the time period the treaties were drawn and was only changed during the 19th century. Prenzlau is situated in the center of Uckermark.

== First Peace of Prenzlau (1448) ==
After a series of conflicts, the Brandenburgian margraves and the Pomeranian dukes partitioned the Uckermark with the Treaty of Prenzlau (1448). The southern parts should belong to Brandenburg, while the northern parts stayed with Pomerania. The northern parts were to be inherited by Brandenburg in case the House of Pomerania were to become extinct. The peace treaty was prepared in 1447 and signed on 3 May 1448.

== Second Peace of Prenzlau (1472, 1479) ==
War started again when Stettin (Szczecin) refused to hail the Brandenburgian margraves, which it was supposed to following the Treaty of Soldin (1466). Brandenburg responded by attacking the Pomeranian duchy and advanced deep into Pomerania-Stettin, which before the war included the Uckermark.

Most of the fighting in this war was ended by a truce, the treaty of Prenzlau (1468): Brandenburg thereby kept the southern Uckermark gained in the course of the war from Pomerania. The truce concluded in September 1468 was prolonged in 1469 in Petrikau.

The Second Treaty of Prenzlau (1472) was a peace treaty signed on 31 May 1472 between Albert III, Elector of Brandenburg, and the Dukes of Pomerania. Based on the terms of the accord, the dukes Eric II and Wartislaw X surrendered the Duchy of Pomerania-Stettin to Albert III, with the Uckermark becoming an integral part of Brandenburg and the remainder of Pomerania-Stettin becoming a Brandenburgian vassal. This accord was confirmed by Holy Roman Emperor Frederick III in 1473.

A third treaty of Prenzlau (1479) confirmed the 1472 one.

== See also ==
- List of treaties
