= Great Sleigh Drive =

Winter campaign of Frederick William of Brandenburg against Sweden in 1679

- Part of the Scanian War
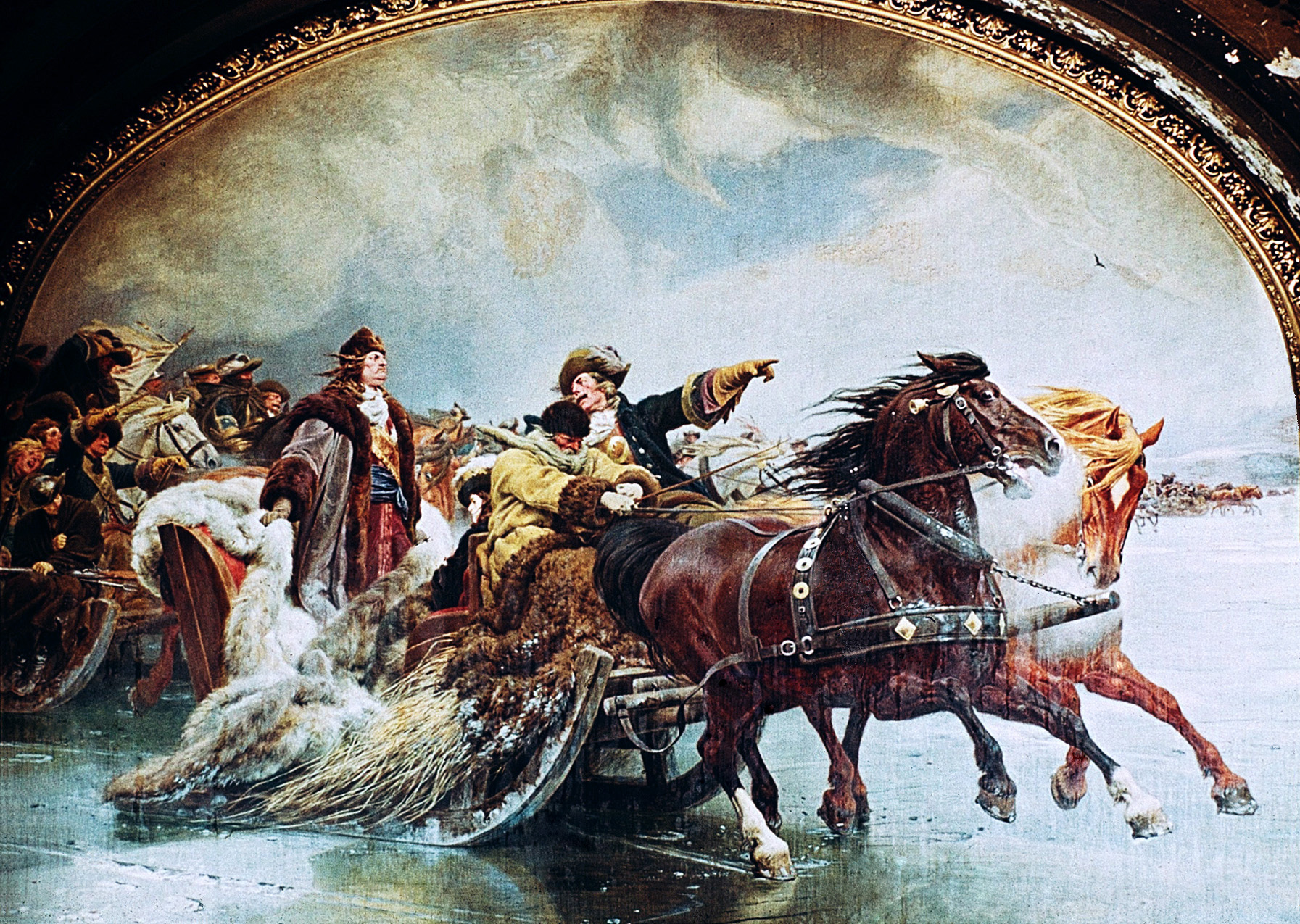
- Frederick William pursues Swedish troops across the frozen Curonian Lagoon; fresco by Wilhelm Simmler, c. 1891
Date	December 1678 – February 1679
Location	Duchy of Prussia and the Polish–Lithuanian Commonwealth
Result	Brandenburgian victory

Belligerents
Brandenburg-Prussia	(yes) Swedish Empire

Commanders and leaders
Frederick William	(Swedish Empire) Henrik Horn

Strength
14,000–15,000; 34 guns	6,000–7,000

Casualties and losses
	1,000–2,000 dead, captured or deserted

"The Great Sleigh Drive" (German: Die große Schlittenfahrt) from December 1678 to February 1679 was a daring and bold maneuver using sleighs by Frederick William, the Great Elector of Brandenburg-Prussia, to drive Swedish forces out of the Duchy of Prussia, a territory of his which had been invaded by the Swedes in November 1678.

== Background ==
Frederick William had previously defeated the Swedes and driven them from Brandenburg at the Battle of Fehrbellin and now faced another punitive Swedish incursion into his territories. The main body of his army was engaged at the siege of the Swedish-held port city of Stralsund on the coast of the Baltic Sea far to the west, so Frederick marched his army to the small town of Preußisch Holland and engaged a small Swedish force occupying the city. The Swedes, having been soundly defeated at the Battle of Fehrbellin, were hesitant to face Frederick William again and decided to retreat to the coast in order to return to Sweden, having already accomplished their goal of looting much of the province and avenging their earlier defeat.

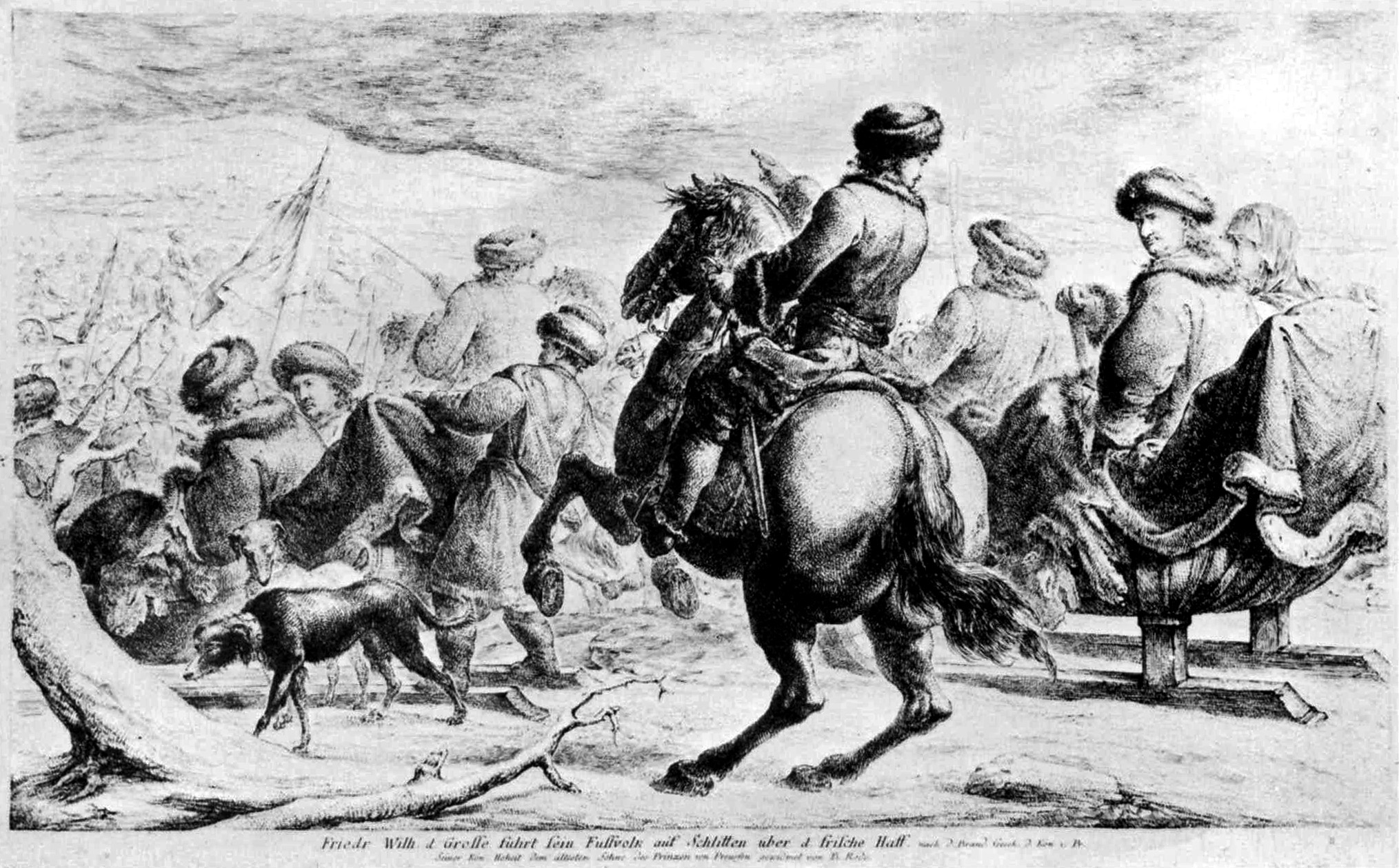
Engraving by Bernhard Rode, ca. 1783

== Sleigh Drive ==
Most commanders would have simply allowed the Swedes to depart, but Frederick William was particularly aggressive and came across the ingenious idea of commandeering thousands of sleighs from local peasantry to transport his army across the snowy terrain of the Duchy of Prussia to cut off the Swedes' escape route: creating, in effect, a precursor to motorised infantry. Driving over the heavy snow and several frozen lakes, Frederick managed to drive deep into the flanks and rear of the escaping Swedish force, denying them access to the coast and their navy, which would have allowed them to resupply or escape.

== Aftermath ==
Frederick's forces managed to ride all the way to Memel, completely cutting off the Swedes from the coast. Although the Brandenburg forces never actually managed to force the Swedes to commit to the field in an open battle as Frederick had wanted, many Swedish troops perished in the harsh winter from hypothermia and starvation, and the Swedish army was effectively destroyed. This victory cemented Frederick William's reputation as a great military strategist.

== Significance ==
Maneuver warfare, or as the Germans call it, Bewegungskrieg, was eventually part of a long-standing tradition of the German military. The Winter Campaign of 1678 and the subsequent Great Sleigh Drive appeared in the German military war journal Militär-Wochenblatt in 1929, in which a (then) relatively unknown Major by the name of Heinz Guderian wrote an article commenting about its use of operational mobility as a decisive factor in victory.

== Order of Battle of the Prussian defense of East Prussia ==
=== October 1678 ===
- Groben Infantry Battalion
- Talan Infantry Battalion
- Samland Militia Cuirassier Regiment
- Nataginsk Militia Cuirassier Regiment
- Dragoons (4 companies)

== Bibliography ==
- Citino, Robert M. (2005). The German Way of War: From the Thirty Years War to the Third Reich. Lawrence, Kansas: University Press of Kansas. ISBN 0-7006-1410-9.
- Clodfelter, Micheal (2008). Warfare and Armed Conflicts: A Statistical Encyclopedia of Casualty and Other Figures, 1492–2015 (2017 ed.). McFarland. p. 47. ISBN 978-0-7864-7470-7.
- Curt, Jany (1967). Geschichte der Preußischen Armee – Vom 15. Jahrhundert bis 1914. Vol. 1. Osnabrück: Biblio Verlag. pp. 229–271. ISBN 9783764814717.
- Wimarson, Nils (1912). Sveriges Krig i Tyskland 1675–1679. Vol. 3. Lund: Gleerupska Universitetsbokhandeln.
