= Brandenburg–Prussia =

Constituent state of the Holy Roman Empire from 1618 to 1701

Coordinates: 52°31′N 13°24′E

Brandenburg–Prussia Brandenburg-Preußen (German)
- 1618–1701
- Coat of arms of Brandenburg Coat of arms of Ducal Prussia

- Brandenburg–Prussia within and outside of the Holy Roman Empire (1618)
- Status: Personal union between the Margraviate of Brandenburg and Duchy of Prussia
- Capital: Berlin and Königsberg
- Religion: Population: Lutheran; Elector-Duke: Calvinist
- Government: Feudal monarchy
- Elector-Duke
  - 1618–1619: John Sigismund
  - 1619–1640: George William
  - 1640–1688: Frederick William
  - 1688–1701: Frederick III (Frederick I)
- Historical era: Early modern period
  - Personal union: 27 August 1618
  - Prussian independence: 19 September 1657
  - Elevation to kingdom: 18 January 1701
Preceded by
Duchy of Prussia
Margraviate of Brandenburg
Duchy of Cleves
Prince-Bishopric of Minden
Duchy of Pomerania
County of Mark
County of Ravensberg
Diocese of Halberstadt
Archbishopric of Magdeburg
Lauenburg and Bütow Land
Draheim
Succeeded by
Kingdom of Prussia
- Today part of: Germany; Poland; Lithuania; Russia; The Netherlands

Brandenburg–Prussia (German: Brandenburg-Preußen; Low German: Brannenborg-Preußen) is the historiographic denomination for the early modern realm of the Brandenburgian House of Hohenzollern between 1618 and 1701. Based in the Electorate of Brandenburg, the main branch of the Hohenzollern intermarried with the branch ruling the Duchy of Prussia, and secured succession upon the latter's extinction in the male line in 1618. Another consequence of intermarriage was the incorporation of the lower Rhenish principalities of Cleves, Mark and Ravensberg after the Treaty of Xanten in 1614.

The Thirty Years' War (1618–1648) was especially devastating. The Elector changed sides three times, and as a result Protestant and Catholic armies swept the land back and forth, killing, burning, seizing men and taking the food supplies. Upwards of half the population was killed or dislocated. Berlin and the other major cities were in ruins, and recovery took decades. By the Peace of Westphalia, which ended the Thirty Years' War in 1648, Brandenburg gained Minden and Halberstadt, also the succession in Farther Pomerania (incorporated in 1653) and the Duchy of Magdeburg (incorporated in 1680). With the Treaty of Bromberg (1657), concluded during the Second Northern War, the electors were freed of Polish vassalage for the Duchy of Prussia and gained Lauenburg–Bütow and Draheim. The Treaty of Saint-Germain-en-Laye (1679) expanded Brandenburgian Pomerania to the lower Oder.

The second half of the 17th century laid the basis for Prussia to become one of the great players in European politics. The emerging Brandenburg-Prussian military potential, based on the introduction of a standing army in 1653, was symbolized by the widely noted victories in Warsaw (1656) and Fehrbellin (1675) and by the Great Sleigh Drive (1678). Brandenburg-Prussia also established a navy and German colonies in the Brandenburger Gold Coast and Arguin. Frederick William, known as "The Great Elector", opened Brandenburg-Prussia to large-scale immigration ("Peuplierung") of mostly Protestant refugees from all across Europe ("Exulanten"), most notably Huguenot immigration following the Edict of Potsdam. Frederick William also started to centralize Brandenburg-Prussia's administration and reduce the influence of the estates.

In 1701, Frederick III, Elector of Brandenburg, succeeded in elevating his status to King in Prussia. This was made possible by the Duchy of Prussia's sovereign status outside the Holy Roman Empire, and approval by the imperial House of Habsburg and other European royals in the course of forming alliances for the War of the Spanish Succession and the Great Northern War. From 1701 onward, the Hohenzollern domains were referred to as the Kingdom of Prussia, or simply Prussia. Legally, the personal union between Brandenburg and Prussia continued until the dissolution of the Holy Roman Empire in 1806. However, by this time the emperor's overlordship over the empire had become a legal fiction. Hence, after 1701, Brandenburg was de facto treated as part of the Prussian kingdom. Frederick and his successors continued to centralize and expand the state, transforming the personal union of politically diverse principalities typical for the Brandenburg-Prussian era into a system of provinces subordinate to Berlin.

== Establishment under John Sigismund (1618) ==
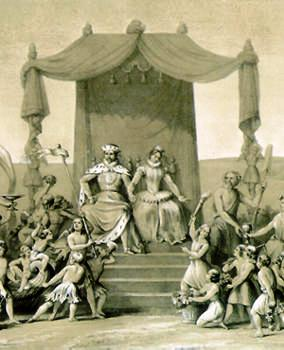
A 19th century allegory visualizing the emergence of Brandenburg–Prussia through the marriage of John Sigismund, Margrave of Brandenburg to Duchess Anna of Prussia

The Margraviate of Brandenburg had been the seat of the main branch of the Hohenzollerns, who were prince-electors in the Holy Roman Empire, since 1415. In 1525, by the Treaty of Krakow, the Duchy of Prussia was created through partial secularization of the State of the Teutonic Order. It was a vassal of the Kingdom of Poland and was governed by Duke Albert of Prussia, a member of a cadet branch of the House of Hohenzollern. On behalf of her mother Elisabeth of the Brandenburgian Hohenzollern, Anna Marie of Brunswick-Lüneburg became Albert's second wife in 1550, and bore him his successor Albert Frederick. In 1563, the Brandenburgian branch of the Hohenzollern was granted the right of succession by the Polish crown. Albert Frederick became duke of Prussia after Albert's death in 1568. His mother died in the same year, and thereafter he showed signs of mental disorder. Because of the duke's illness, Prussia was governed by Albert's nephew George Frederick of Hohenzollern-Ansbach-Jägersdorf (1577–1603). In 1573, Albert Frederick married Marie Eleonore of Jülich-Cleves-Berg, with whom he had several daughters.

In 1594, Albert Frederick's then 14-year-old daughter Anna married the son of Joachim Frederick of Hohenzollern-Brandenburg, John Sigismund. The marriage ensured the right of succession in the Prussian duchy as well as in Cleves. Upon George Frederick's death in 1603, the regency of the Prussian duchy passed to Joachim Frederick. Also in 1603, the Treaty of Gera was concluded by the members of the House of Hohenzollern, ruling that their territories were not to be internally divided in the future.

The Electors of Brandenburg inherited the Duchy of Prussia upon Albert Frederick's death in 1618, but the duchy continued to be held as a fief under the Polish Crown until 1656/7. Since John Sigismund had suffered a stroke in 1616 and as a consequence was severely handicapped physically as well as mentally, his wife Anna ruled the Duchy of Prussia in his name until John Sigismund died of a second stroke in 1619, aged 47.

== George William, 1619–1640 ==
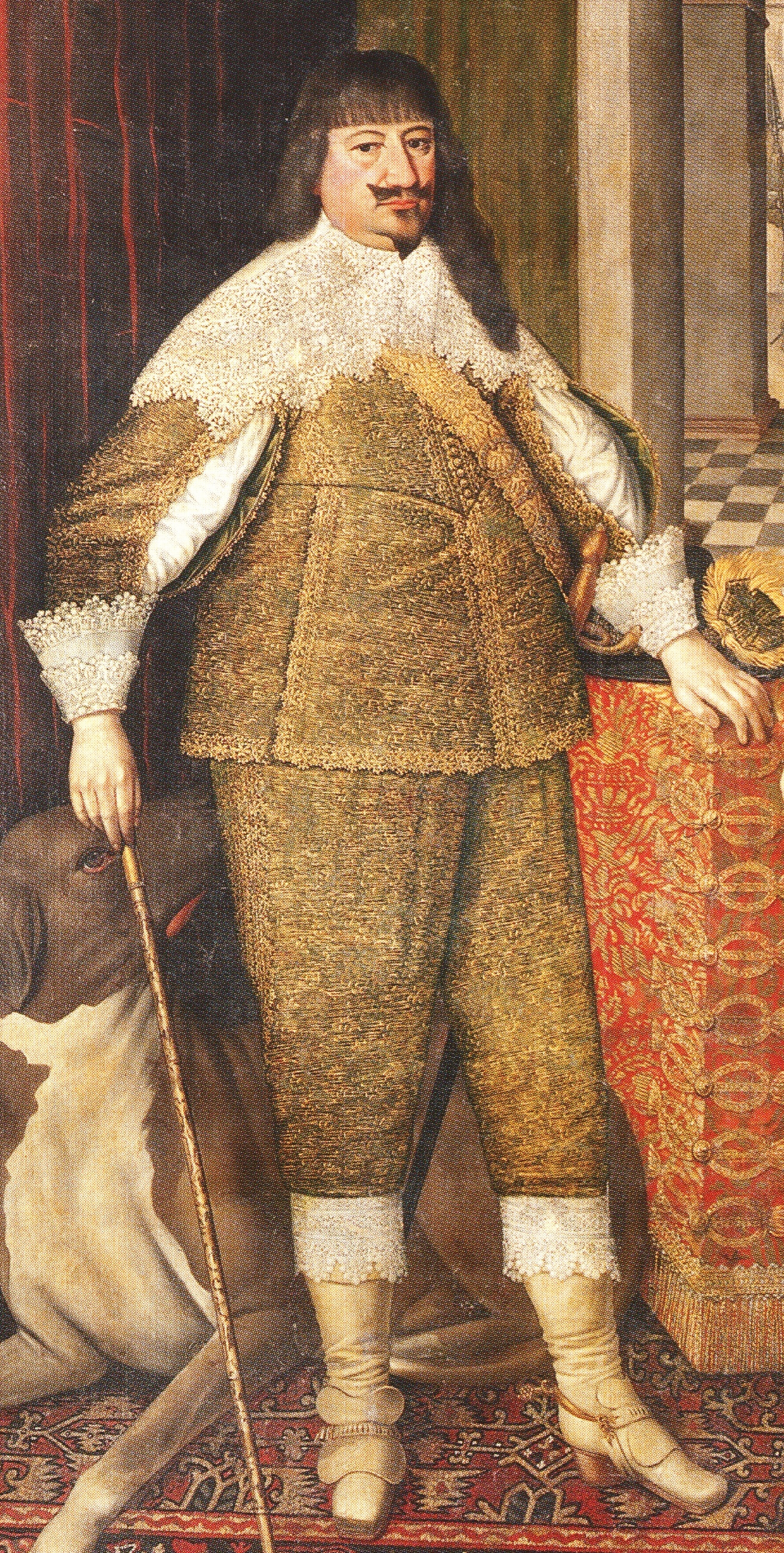
George William, Elector of Brandenburg

From 1619 to 1640, George William was elector of Brandenburg and duke of Prussia. He strove, but proved unable to break the dominance of the Electorate of Saxony in the Upper Saxon Circle. The Brandenburg–Saxon antagonism rendered the defense of the circle ineffective, and it was subsequently overrun by Albrecht von Wallenstein during the Thirty Years' War. While George William had claimed neutrality before, the presence of Wallenstein's army forced him to join the Catholic-Imperial camp in the Treaty of Königsberg in 1627 and accept garrisons. When the Swedish Empire entered the war and advanced into Brandenburg, George William again claimed neutrality, yet Gustavus Adolphus of Sweden compelled George William to join Sweden as an ally by occupying substantial territory in Brandenburg–Prussia and concentrating an army before the town walls of Berlin. George William did not conclude an alliance, but granted Sweden transit rights, two fortresses and subsidies. Consequently, Roman Catholic armies repeatedly ravaged Brandenburg and other Hohenzollern lands.

== "The Great Elector", Frederick William, 1640–1688 ==
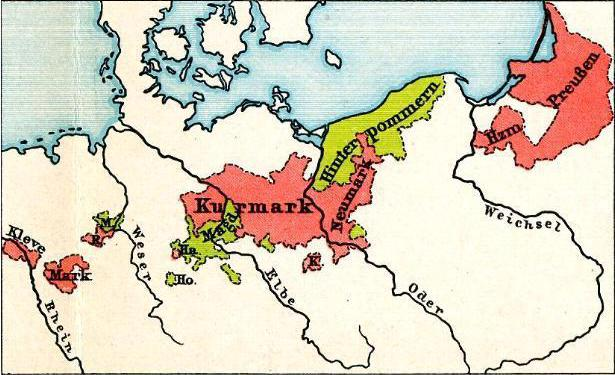
Brandenburg–Prussia (red 1640, red and green 1688)

During the Thirty Years' War, George William was succeeded by Frederick William, born 1620, who became known as "The Great Elector" (Der Große Kurfürst). The character of the young elector had been stamped by his Calvinist nurturer Calcum, a long stay in the Dutch Republic during his grand tour, and the events of the war, of which a meeting with his uncle Gustavus Adolphus of Sweden in Pomerania was among the most impressive.

=== Conclusion of the Thirty Years' War ===
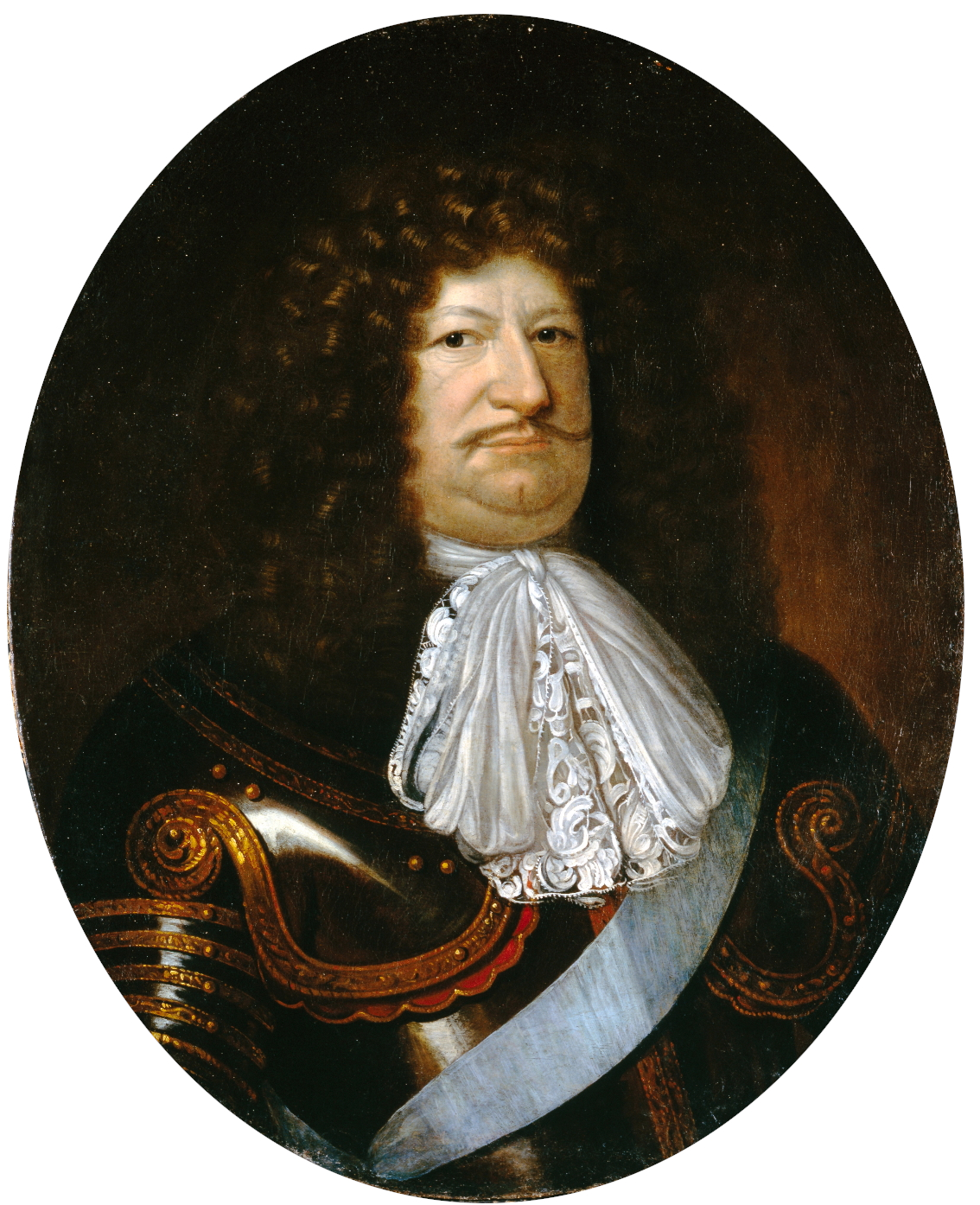
Frederick William, "Great Elector" of Brandenburg–Prussia

Frederick William took over Brandenburg–Prussia in times of a political, economic, and demographic crisis caused by the war. Upon his succession, the new elector retired the Brandenburgian army, but had an army raised again in 1643/1644. Whether or not Frederick William concluded a truce and neutrality agreement with Sweden is disputed: while a relevant 1641 document exists, it was never ratified and has repeatedly been described as a falsification. However, it is not disputed that he established the growth of Brandenburg–Prussia.

At the time, the forces of the Swedish Empire dominated Northern Germany, and along with her ally France, Sweden became guarantee power of the Peace of Westphalia in 1648. The Swedish aim of controlling the Baltic Sea by establishing dominions on the coastline ("dominium maris baltici") thwarted Frederick William's ambitions to gain control over the Oder estuary with Stettin (Szczecin) in Pomerania.

The Brandenburgian margraves had long sought to expand northwards, connecting land-locked Brandenburg to the Baltic Sea. The Treaty of Grimnitz (1529) guaranteed Brandenburgian succession in the Duchy of Pomerania upon the extinction of the local House of Pomerania, and would have come into effect by the death of Pomeranian duke Bogislaw XIV in 1637. By the Treaty of Stettin (1630) however, Bogislaw XIV had also effectively handed over control of the duchy to Sweden, who refused to give in to the Brandenburgian claim. The Peace of Westphalia settled for a partition of the duchy between Brandenburg and Sweden, who determined the exact border in the Treaty of Stettin (1653). Sweden retained the western part including the lower Oder (Swedish Pomerania), while Brandenburg gained the eastern part (Farther Pomerania). Frederick William was dissatisfied by this outcome, and the acquisition of the whole Duchy of Pomerania was to become one of the main goals of his foreign policy.

In the Peace of Westphalia, Frederick William was compensated for Western Pomerania with the secularized bishoprics of Halberstadt and Minden and the right of succession to the likewise secularized Archbishopric of Magdeburg. With Halberstadt, Brandenburg–Prussia also gained several smaller territories: the Lordship of Derenburg, the County of Regenstein, the Lordship of Klettenberg and the Lordship of Lohra. This was primarily due to French efforts to counterbalance the power of the Habsburg emperor by strengthening the Hohenzollern, and while Frederick William valued these territories lower than Western Pomerania, they became step-stones for the creation of a closed, dominant realm in Germany in the long run.

=== Devastation ===
Of all Brandenburg–Prussian territories, the Electorate of Brandenburg was among the most devastated at the end of the Thirty Years' War. Already before the war, the population density and wealth in the electorate had been low compared to other territories of the empire, and the war had destroyed 60 towns, 48 castles and about 5,000 villages. An average of 50% of the population was dead; in some regions, only 10% survived. The rural population, due to deaths and flight to the towns, had dropped from 300,000 before the war to 75,000 thereafter. In the important towns of Berlin-Cölln and Frankfurt an der Oder, the population drop was one third and two thirds, respectively. Some of the territories gained after the war were likewise devastated: in Pomerania, only one third of the population survived, and Magdeburg, once among the wealthiest cities of the empire, was burned down with most of the population slain. Least hit were the Duchy of Prussia, which was only peripherally involved in the war, and Minden. In 1670, the Great Elector invited Jews expelled from Vienna to settle in Brandenburg.

Despite efforts to resettle the devastated territories, it took some of them until the mid-18th century to reach the pre-war population density.

=== Cow War ===
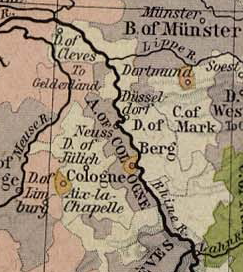
Map of the Lower Rhenish duchies

In June 1651, Frederick William broke the provisions of the Peace of Westphalia by invading Jülich-Berg, bordering his possessions in Cleves-Mark at the lower Rhine river. The Treaty of Xanten, which had ended the War of the Jülich succession between Brandenburg and the count palatines in 1614, had partitioned the once united Duchies of Jülich-Cleves-Berg among the belligerents, and Jülich-Berg was since ruled by the Catholic counts of Palatinate-Neuburg. After the Thirty Years' War, Wolfgang William, Count Palatine of Neuburg disregarded a 1647 agreement with Frederick William, which had favored the Protestants in the duchies, while Frederick William insisted that the agreement be upheld. Besides these religious motives, Frederick William's invasion also aimed at territorial expansion.

The conflict had the potential to spark another international war since Wolfgang William wanted to have the still not demobilized army of Lorraine, which continued to operate in the region despite the Peace of Westphalia, to intervene on his side, and Frederick William sought support of the Dutch Republic. The latter however followed a policy of neutrality and refused to aid Frederick William's campaign, which was furthermore opposed by the Imperial estates as well as the local ones. Politically isolated, Frederick William aborted the campaign after the Treaty of Kleve negotiated by Imperial mediators in October 1651. The underlying religious dispute was only solved in 1672. While military confrontations were avoided and the Brandenburg–Prussian army was primarily occupied with stealing cattle (hence the name), it considerably lowered Frederick William's reputation.

=== Standing Army ===
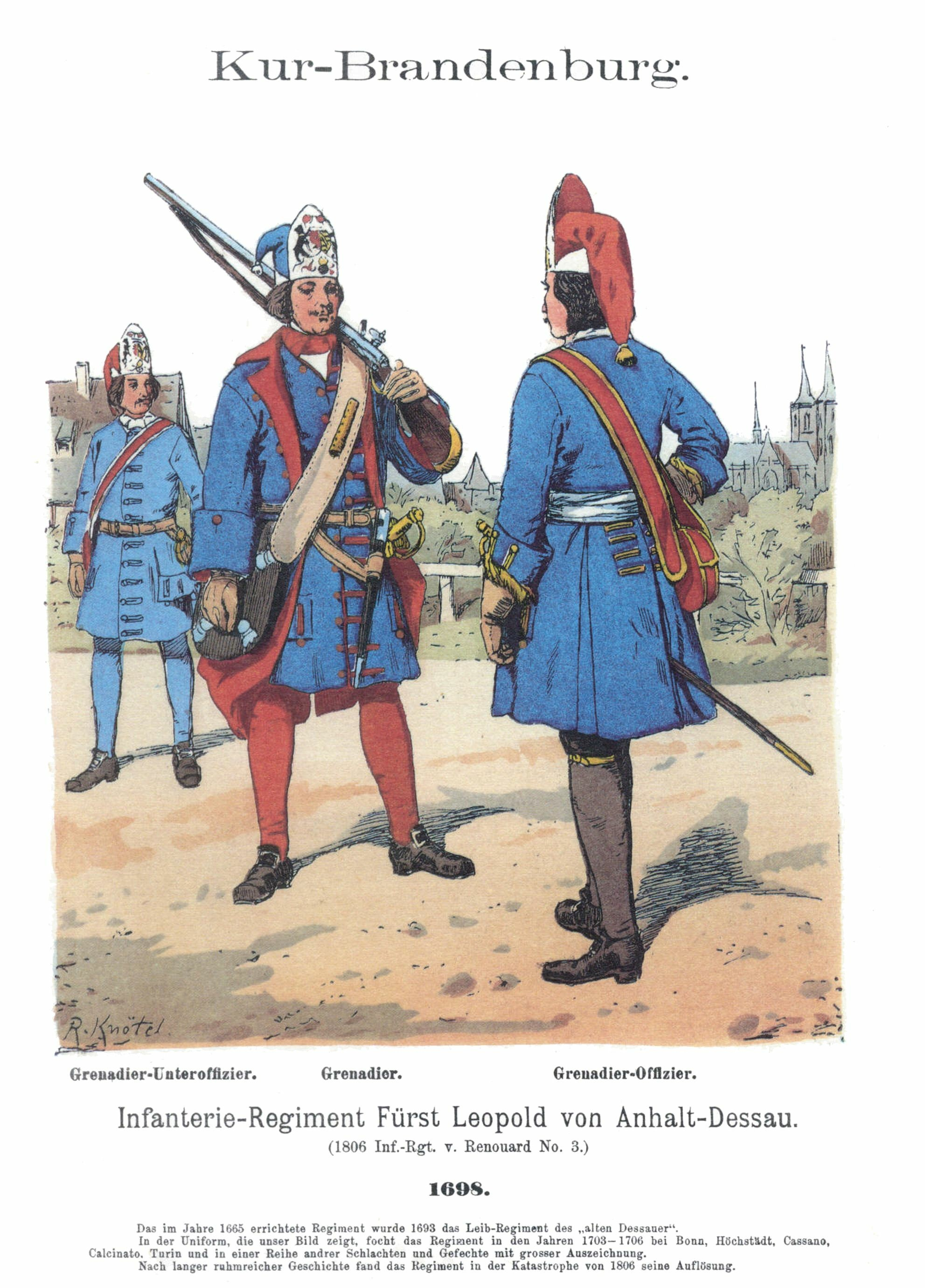
Uniforms of the Brandenburg–Prussian army in 1698

Due to his wartime experiences, Frederick William was convinced that Brandenburg–Prussia would only prevail with a standing army. Traditionally, raising and financing army reserves was a privilege of the estates, yet Frederick William envisioned a standing army financed independently of the estates. He succeeded in getting the consent and necessary financial contributions of the estates in a landtag decree of 26 July 1653. In turn, he confirmed several privileges of the knights, including tax exemption, assertion of jurisdiction and police powers on their estates (Patrimonialgerichtsbarkeit) and the upholding of serfdom (Leibeigenschaft, Bauernlegen).

Initially, the estates' contributions were limited to six years, yet Frederick William obliged the estates to continue the payments thereafter and created a dedicated office to collect the contributions. The contributions were confirmed by the estates in 1662, but transformed in 1666 by decree from a real estate tax to an excise tax. Since 1657, the towns had to contribute not soldiers, but monetary payments to the army, and since 1665, the estates were able to free themselves from contributing soldiers by additional payments. The initial army size of 8,000 men had risen to 25,000 to 30,000 men by 1688. By then, Frederick William had also accomplished his second goal, to finance the army independently of the estates. By 1688, these military costs amounted to a considerable 1,500,000 talers or half of the state budget. Ensuring a solid financial basis for the army, undisturbed by the estates, was the foremost objective of Frederick William's administrative reforms. He regarded military success as the only way to gain international reputation.

=== Second Northern War ===
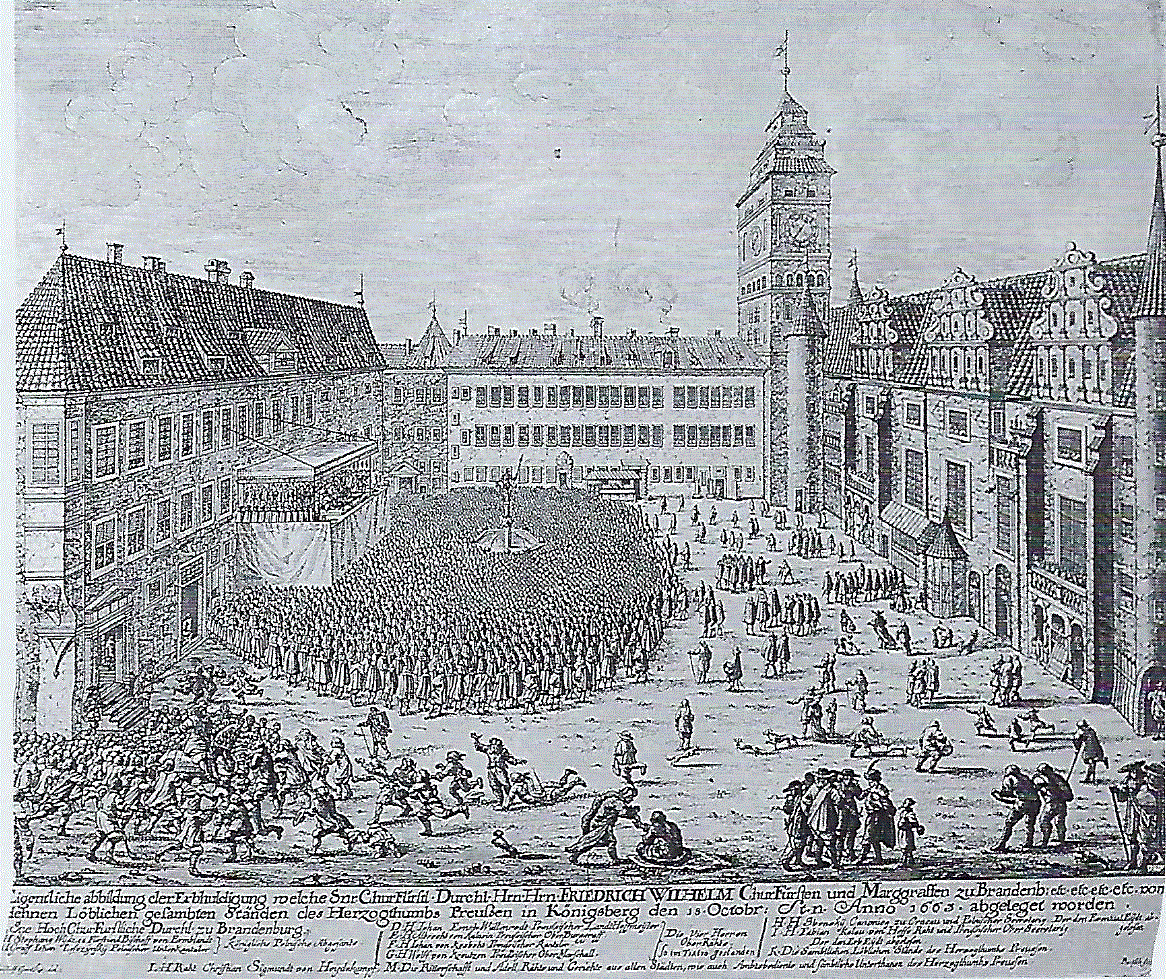
The Prussian estates paying homage to sovereign Frederick William I in Königsberg Castle, 1663

The Swedish invasion of the Polish–Lithuanian Commonwealth in the following year started the Second Northern War. Frederick William offered protection to the Royal Prussian towns in the Treaty of Rinsk, but had to yield Swedish military supremacy and withdraw to his Prussian duchy. Pursued by Swedish forces to the Prussian capital, Frederick William made peace and allied with Sweden, taking the Duchy of Prussia and Ermland (Ermeland, Warmia) as fiefs from Charles X Gustav of Sweden in the Treaty of Königsberg in January 1656. The alliance proved victorious in the Battle of Warsaw in June, enhancing the elector's international reputation. Continued pressure on Charles X Gustav resulted in him conceding full sovereignty in Ducal Prussia and Ermland to Frederick William by the Treaty of Labiau in November to ensure the maintenance of the alliance. The Treaty of Radnot, concluded in December by Sweden and her allies, further awarded Greater Poland to Brandenburg–Prussia in case of a victory.

When the anti-Swedish coalition, however, gained the upper hand, Frederick William changed sides when Polish king John II Casimir Vasa confirmed his sovereignty in Prussia, but not in Ermland, in the Treaty of Wehlau-Bromberg in 1657. The duchy would legally revert to Poland if the Hohenzollern dynastic line became extinct. Hohenzollern sovereignty in the Prussian duchy was confirmed in the Peace of Oliva, which ended the war in 1660. Brandenburg–Prussian campaigns in Swedish Pomerania did not result in permanent gains.

=== Dutch and Scanian Wars ===
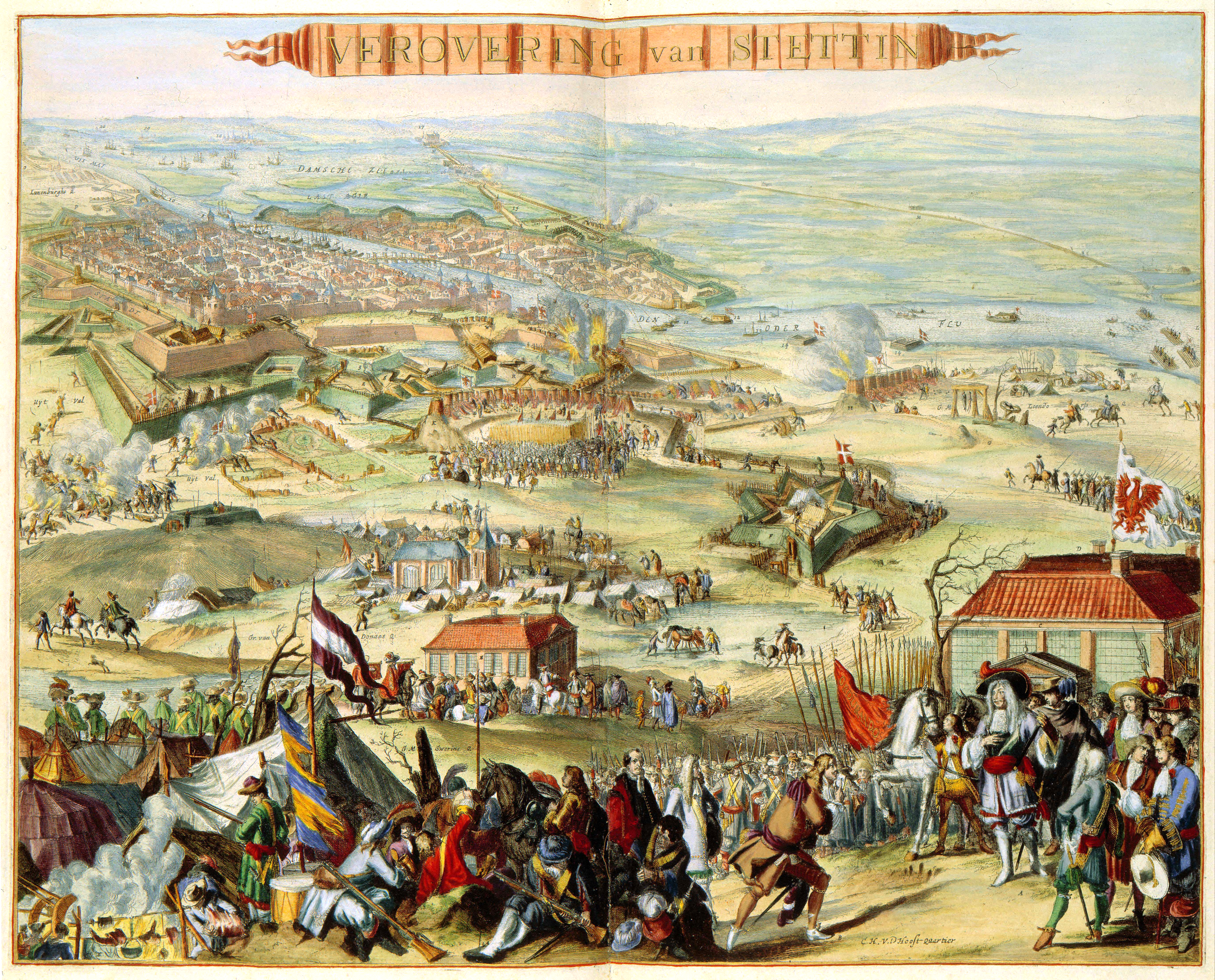
Siege of Stettin in 1677

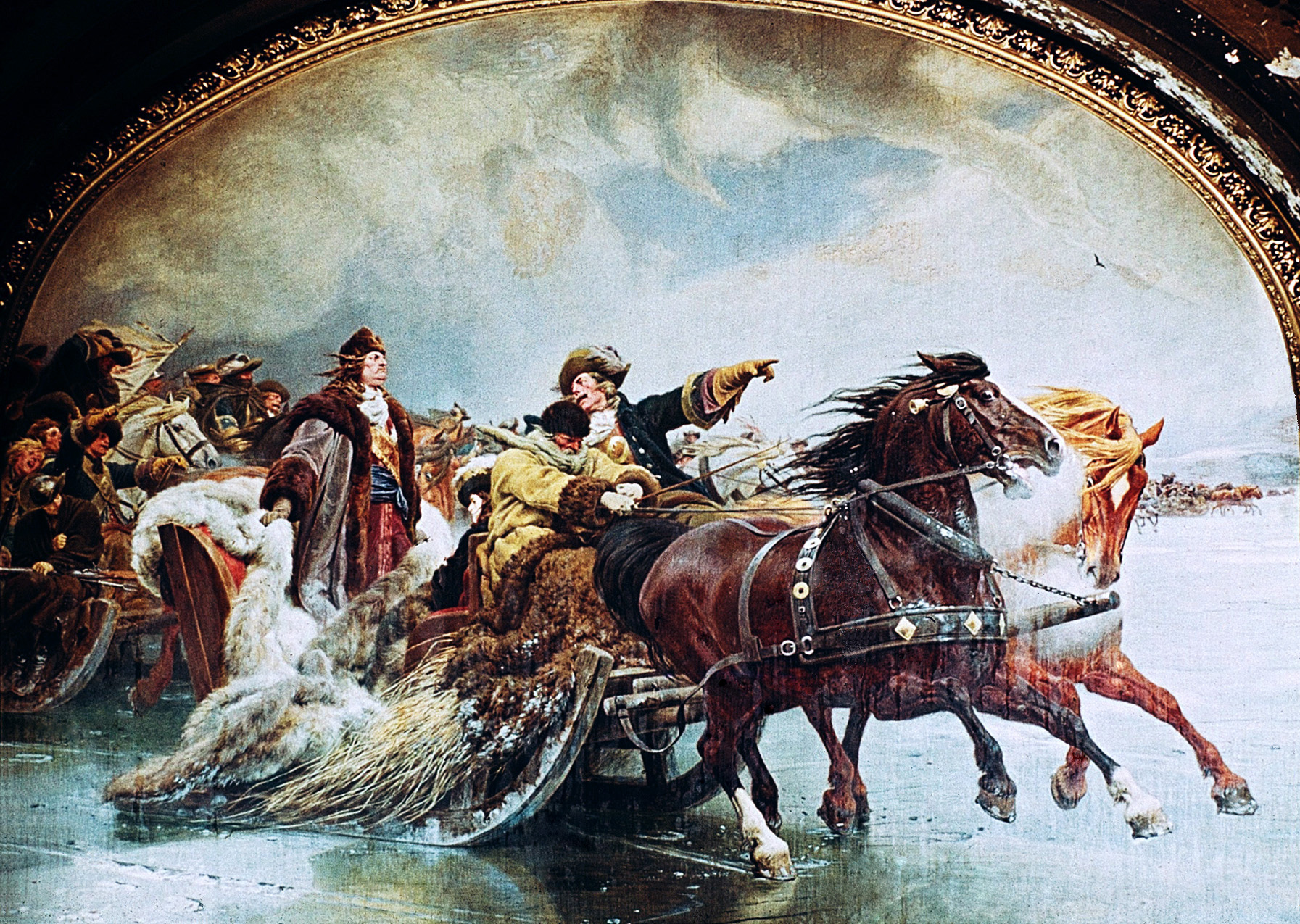
Great Sleigh Drive (1678): Frederick William pursues Swedish troops across the frozen Curonian Lagoon; fresco by Wilhelm Simmler, c. 1891

In 1672, the Franco-Dutch War broke out, with Brandenburg–Prussia involved as an ally of the Dutch Republic. This alliance was based on a treaty of 1669, and resulted in French occupation of Brandenburg–Prussian Cleves. In June 1673, Frederick William abandoned the Dutch alliance and concluded a subsidy treaty with France, who in return withdrew from Cleves. When the Holy Roman Empire declared war on France, a so-called Reichskrieg, Brandenburg–Prussia again changed sides and joined the imperial forces. France pressured her ally Sweden to relieve her by attacking Brandenburg–Prussia from the north. Charles XI of Sweden, dependent on French subsidies, reluctantly occupied the Brandenburgian Uckermark in 1674, starting the German theater of the Scanian War (Brandenburg–Swedish War). Frederick William reacted promptly by marching his armies from the Rhine to northern Brandenburg, and encountered the rear of the Swedish army, which was in the process of crossing a swamp, in the Battle of Fehrbellin (1675). Though a minor skirmish from a military perspective, Frederick William's victory turned out to be of huge symbolic significance. The "Great Elector" started a counter-offensive, pursuing the retreating Swedish forces through Swedish Pomerania.

Polish king John III Sobieski planned to restore Polish suzerainty over the Duchy of Prussia, and for this purpose concluded an alliance with France on 11 June 1675. France promised assistance and subsidies, while Sobieski in turn allowed French recruitment in Poland-Lithuania and promised to aid Hungarian rebel forces who were to distract the Habsburgs from their war against France. For this plan to work out, Poland-Lithuania had to first conclude her war against the Ottoman Empire, which French diplomacy despite great efforts failed to achieve. Furthermore, Sobieski was opposed by the Papacy, by Polish gentry who saw the Ottomans as the greater threat, and by Polish magnates bribed by Berlin and Vienna. Inner-Polish Catholic opposition to an intervention on the Protestant Hungarian rebels' side added to the resentments. Thus, while Treaty of Żurawno ended the Polish–Ottoman war in 1676, Sobieski sided with the emperor instead, and the plan for a Prussian campaign was dropped.

By 1678, Frederick William had cleared Swedish Pomerania and occupied most of it, with the exception of Rügen which was held by Denmark–Norway. This was followed by another success against Sweden, when Frederick William cleared Prussia of Swedish forces in what became known as the Great Sleigh Drive. However, when Louis XIV of France concluded the Dutch War by the Nijmegen treaties, he marched his armies east to relieve his Swedish ally, and forced Frederick William to basically return to the status quo ante bellum by the Treaty of Saint-Germain-en-Laye (1679). Though the Scanian War resulted only in minor territorial gains, attaching a small strip of the Swedish Pomeranian right bank of the lower Oder to Brandenburg–Prussian Pomerania, the war resulted in a huge gain of prestige for the elector.

== Frederick III (I), 1688–1713 ==
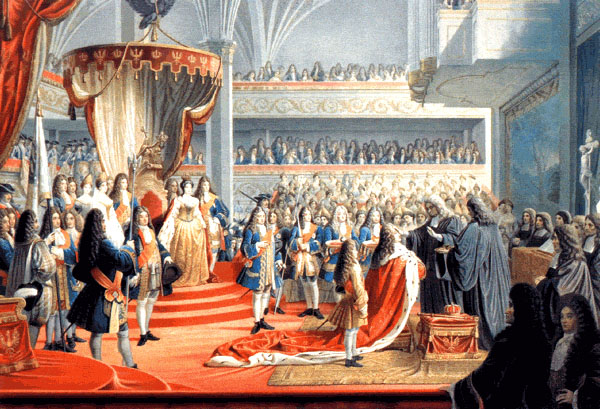
Anointment of Frederick III (I) after his coronation as King in Prussia in Königsberg, 1701

Frederick III of Brandenburg, since 1701 also Frederick I of Prussia, was born in Königsberg in 1657. Already in the last years of the reign of his father, the friendly relations with France established after Saint Germain (1679) had cooled, not least because of the Huguenot question. In 1686, Frederick William turned toward the Habsburg emperor, with whom he concluded an alliance on 22 December 1686. For this alliance, Frederick William relinquished rights on Silesia in favor of the Habsburgs, and in turn received the Silesian County of Schwiebus which bordered the Neumark. Frederick III, present at the negotiations as crown prince, assured the Habsburgs of the continuation of the alliance once he was in power, and secretly concluded an amendment to return Schwiebus to the Habsburgs, which he eventually did in 1694. Throughout his reign, Brandenburg–Prussia remained a Habsburg ally and repeatedly deployed troops to fight against France. In 1693, Frederick III began to sound out the possibility of an elevation of his status at the Habsburg court in Vienna, and while the first attempt was unsuccessful, elevation to a king remained the central goal on his agenda.

The envisioned status elevation did not merely serve a decorative purpose, but was regarded a necessity to prevail in political competition. Though Frederick III held the elevated status of a prince elector, this status was also gained by Maximilian I of Bavaria in 1623, during the Thirty Years' War, also by the Elector of the Palatinate in the Peace of Westphalia (1648), and by Ernest Augustus of the House of Hanover in 1692. Thus, the formerly exclusive club of the prince-electors now had nine members, six of whom were secular princes, and further changes seemed possible. Within the circle of prince-electors, August the Strong, Elector of Saxony, had secured the Polish crown in 1697, and the House of Hanover had secured succession of the British throne. From Frederick III's perspective, stagnation in status meant loss of power, and this perspective seemed to be confirmed when the European royals ignored Brandenburg–Prussia's claims in the Treaty of Rijswijk (1697).

Frederick decided to raise the Duchy of Prussia to a kingdom. Within the Holy Roman Empire, no one could call himself king except the emperor and the king of Bohemia. However, Prussia was outside the empire, and the Hohenzollerns were fully sovereign over it. The practicability of this plan was doubted by some of his advisors, and in any case the crown was only valuable if recognized by the European nobility, most important the Holy Roman Emperor. In 1699, negotiations were renewed with emperor Leopold I, who in turn was in need of allies since the War of the Spanish Succession was about to break out. On 16 November 1700, the emperor approved Frederick's coronation in the Crown Treaty. With respect to Poland–Lithuania, who held the provinces of Royal Prussia and Ermland, it was agreed that Frederick would call himself King in Prussia, instead of King of Prussia. Great Britain and the Dutch Republic, for similar reasons as the emperor, accepted Frederick's elevation prior to the coronation.

On 17 January 1701, Frederick dedicated the royal coat of arms, the Prussian black eagle, and motto, "suum cuique". On 18 January, he crowned himself and his wife Sophie Charlotte in a baroque ceremony in Königsberg Castle.

On 28 January, Augustus the Strong congratulated Frederick, yet not as Polish king, but as Saxon elector. In February, Denmark–Norway accepted Frederick's elevation in the hope of an ally in the Great Northern War, and the Tsardom of Russia likewise approved in 1701. Most princes of the Holy Roman Empire followed. Charles XII of Sweden accepted Frederick as Prussian king in 1703. In 1713, France and Spain also accepted Frederick's royal status.

The coronation was not accepted by the Teutonic Order, who despite the secularization of the Duchy of Prussia in 1525 upheld claims to the region. The Grand Master protested at the emperor's court, and the pope sent a circular to all Catholic regents to not accept Frederick's royal status. Until 1787, papal documents continued to speak of the Prussian kings as "Margraves of Brandenburg". Neither did the Polish–Lithuanian nobility accept Frederick's royal status, seeing the Polish province of Royal Prussia endangered, and only in 1764 was the Prussian kingship accepted.

Since Brandenburg was still legally part of the Holy Roman Empire, the personal union between Brandenburg and Prussia technically continued until the empire's dissolution in 1806. However, the emperor's power was only nominal by this time, and Brandenburg soon came to be treated as a de facto province of the Prussian kingdom. Although Frederick was still only an elector within the portions of his domain that were part of the empire, he acknowledged the emperor's overlordship over them in a formal way.

== Administration ==
In the mid-16th century, the margraves of Brandenburg had become highly dependent on the estates (counts, lords, knights and towns, no prelates due to the Protestant Reformation in 1538). The margraviate's liabilities and tax income, as well as the margrave's finances, were controlled by the Kreditwerk, an institution not controlled by the elector, and the Großer Ausschuß ("Great Committee") of the estates. This was due to concessions made by Joachim II in 1541 in turn for financial aid by the estates; however, the Kreditwerk went bankrupt between 1618 and 1625. The margraves further had to yield the veto of the estates in all issues concerning the "better or worse of the country", in all legal commitments, and in all issues concerning pawn or sale of the elector's real property.

Hohenzollern residence in Berlin

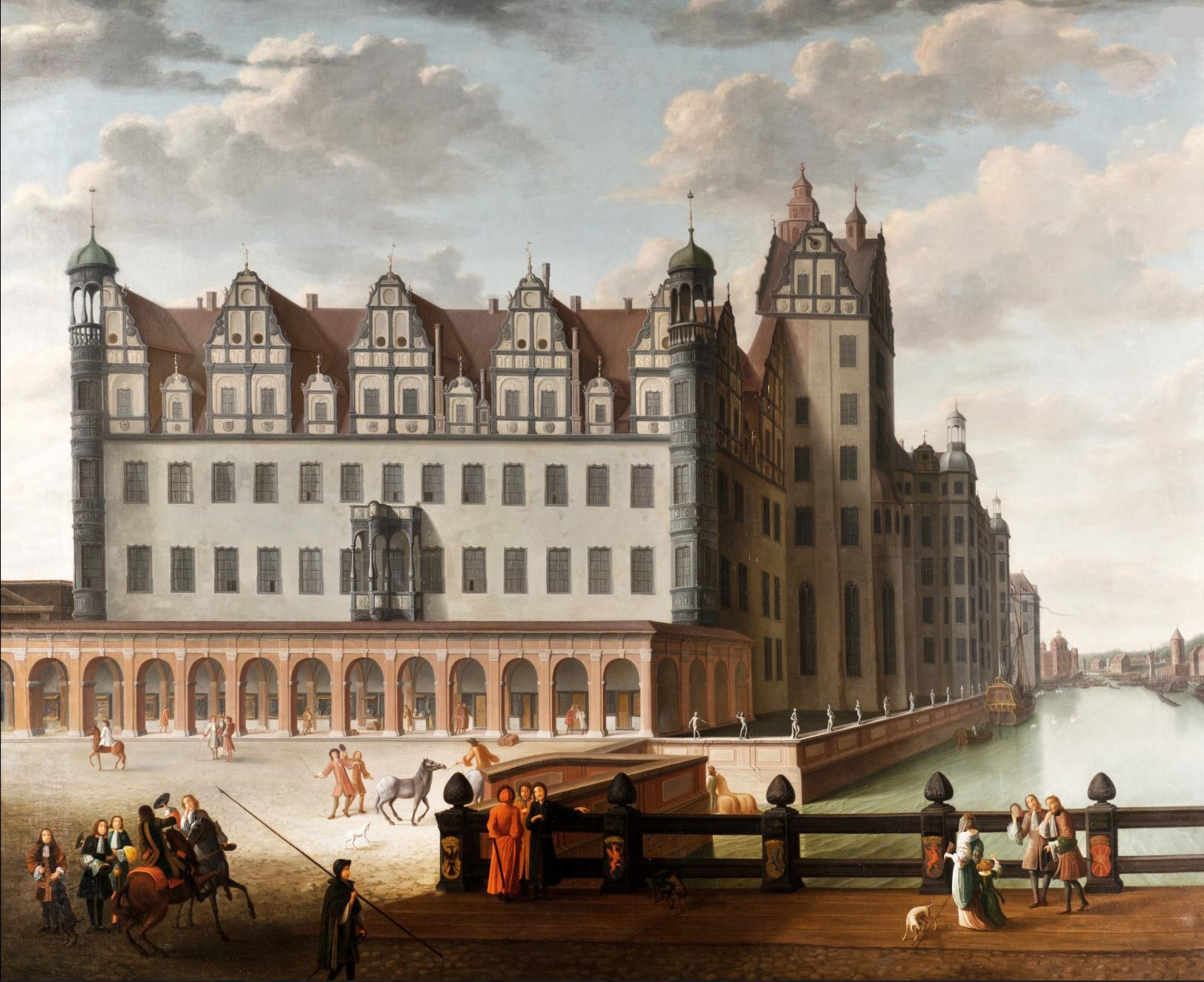
[...] during the Renaissance period

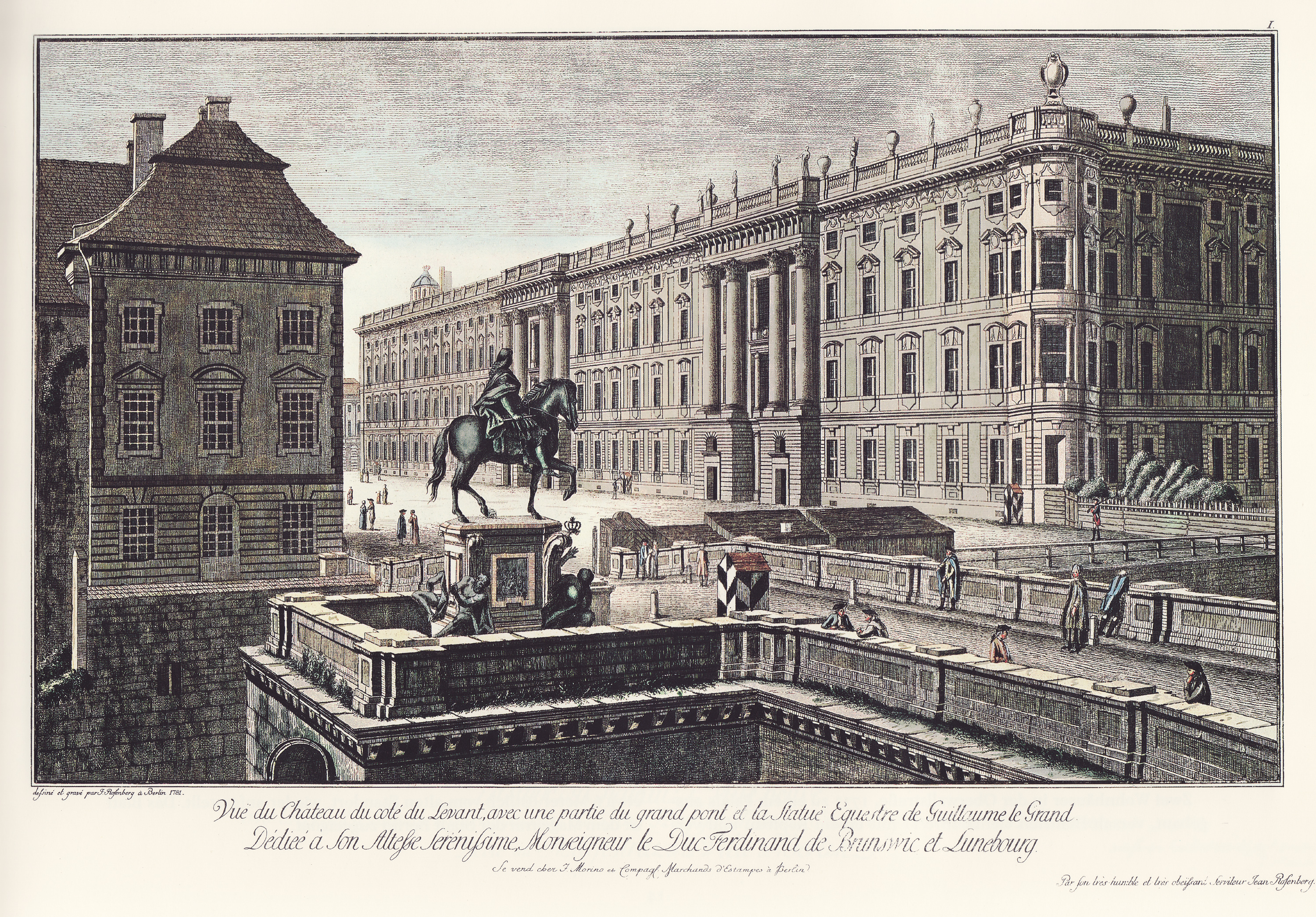
[...] according to the design of 1781

To reduce the influence of the estates, Joachim Frederick in 1604 created a council called Geheimer Rat für die Kurmark ("Privy Council for the Electorate"), which, instead of the estates, was to function as the supreme advisory council for the elector. While the council was permanently established in 1613, it failed to gain any influence until 1651 due to the Thirty Years' War.

Until after the Thirty Years' War, the territories of Brandenburg–Prussia were politically independent from each other, connected only by the common feudal superior. Frederick William, who envisioned the transformation of the personal union into a real union, started to centralize the Brandenburg–Prussian government with an attempt to establish the Geheimer Rat as a central authority for all territories in 1651, but this project proved to be unfeasible. Instead, the elector continued to appoint a governor (Kurfürstlicher Rat) for each territory, who in most cases was a member of the Geheimer Rat. The most powerful institution in the territories remained the governments of the estates (Landständische Regierung, named Oberratsstube in Prussia and Geheime Landesregierung in Mark and Cleves), which were the highest government agencies regarding jurisdiction, finances and administration. The elector attempted to balance the estates' governments by creating Amtskammer chambers to administer and coordinate the elector's domains, tax income and privileges. Such chambers were introduced in Brandenburg in 1652, in Cleves and Mark in 1653, in Pomerania in 1654, in Prussia in 1661 and in Magdeburg in 1680. Also in 1680, the Kreditwerk came under the aegis of the elector.

Frederick William's excise tax (Akzise), which, since 1667, replaced the property tax raised in Brandenburg for Brandenburg–Prussia's standing army with the estates' consent, was raised by the elector without consultation of the estates. The conclusion of the Second Northern War had strengthened the elector politically, enabling him to reform the constitution of Cleves and Mark in 1660 and 1661 to introduce officials loyal to him and independent of the local estates. In the Duchy of Prussia, he confirmed the traditional privileges of the estates in 1663, but the latter accepted the caveat that these privileges were not to be used to interfere with the exertion of the elector's sovereignty. As in Brandenburg, Frederick William ignored the privilege of the Prussian estates to confirm or veto taxes raised by the elector: while in 1656, an Akzise was raised with the estates' consent, the elector, by force, collected taxes not approved by the Prussian estates for the first time in 1674. Since 1704, the Prussian estates had de facto relinquished their right to approve the elector's taxes while formally still entitled to do so. In 1682, the elector introduced an Akzise to Pomerania and in 1688 to Magdeburg, while in Cleves and Mark an Akzise was introduced only between 1716 and 1720. Due to Frederick William's reforms, the state income increased threefold during his reign, and the tax burden per subject reached a level twice as high as in France.

Under the rule of Frederick III (I), the Brandenburg Prussian territories were de facto reduced to provinces of the monarchy. Frederick William's testament would have divided Brandenburg–Prussia among his sons, yet firstborn Frederick III with the emperor's backing succeeded in becoming the sole ruler based on the Treaty of Gera, which forbade a division of Hohenzollern territories. In 1689, a new central chamber for all Brandenburg–Prussian territories was created, called Geheime Hofkammer (since 1713: Generalfinanzdirektorium). This chamber functioned as a superior agency of the territories' Amtskammer chambers. The General War Commissariat (Generalkriegskommissariat) emerged as a second central agency, superior to the local Kriegskommissariat agencies initially concerned with the administration of the army, but until 1712 transformed into an agency also concerned with general tax and police tasks.

=== Map ===
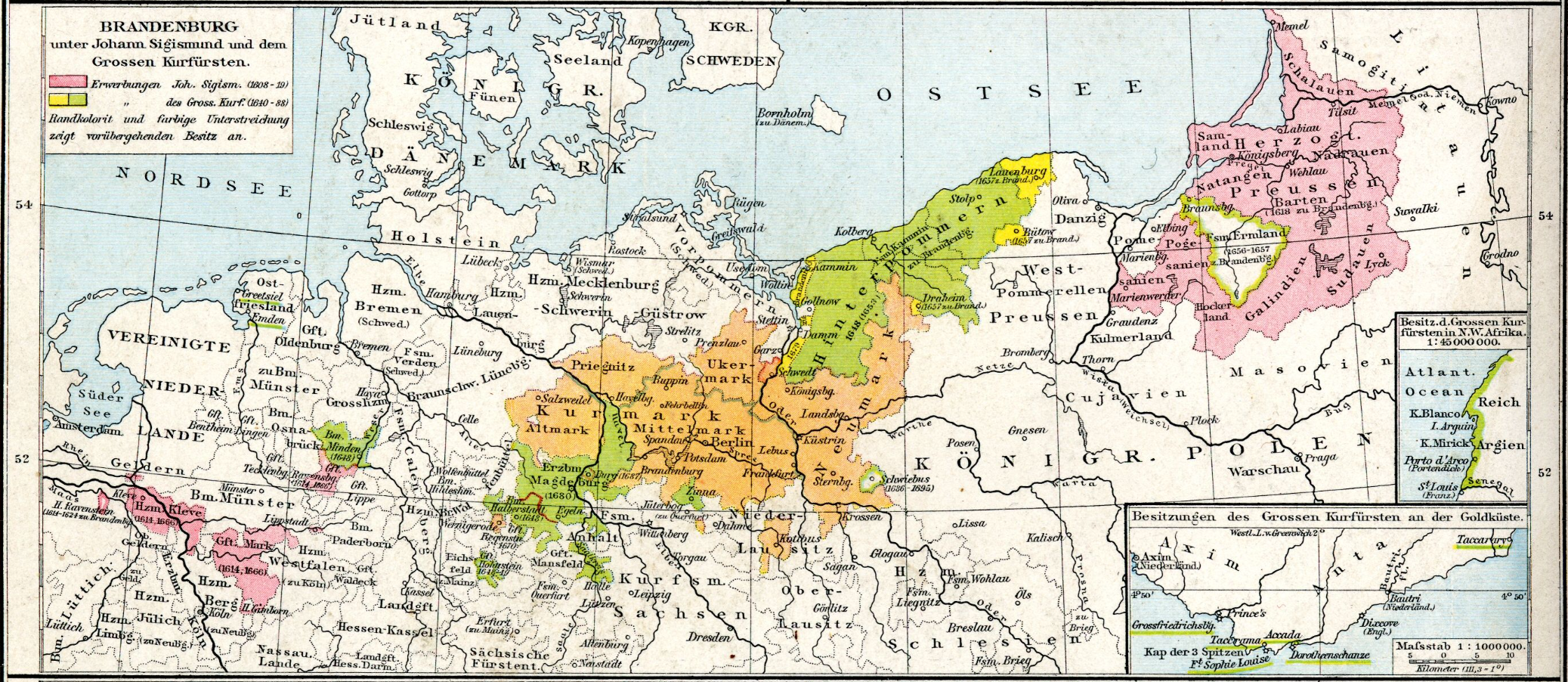
Brandenburg–Prussia. Orange: Electorate of Brandenburg; red: under John Sigismund; green/yellow: under Frederick William I

=== List of territories ===
List of territories
Name	Year of acquisition	How obtained
Margraviate of Brandenburg	1415	Core territory, Holy Roman electorate
Duchy of Cleves	1614	Treaty of Xanten
County of Mark	1614	Treaty of Xanten
County of Ravensberg	1614	Treaty of Xanten
Duchy of Prussia	1618	Succession as Polish vassal, Swedish vassal in 1656 (Treaty of Königsberg), sovereign since 1656 (Treaty of Labiau with Sweden) and 1657 (Treaty of Wehlau-Bromberg with Poland-Lithuania), confirmed in 1660 by the signatories of the Peace of Oliva
Bishopric of Minden	1648	Peace of Westphalia
Principality of Halberstadt	1648	Peace of Westphalia
Farther Pomerania with Cammin	1653	Treaty of Grimnitz (entitlement); Peace of Westphalia (entitlement); Treaty of Stettin (incorporation); slightly enlarged by the Treaty of Saint-Germain-en-Laye (1679)
Ermland (Ermeland, Warmia)	1656	Treaty of Königsberg (Swedish fief), sovereign since 1656 (Treaty of Labiau), lost in 1657 (Treaty of Wehlau-Bromberg)
Lauenburg and Bütow Land	1657	Treaty of Bromberg
Draheim	1657	Treaty of Bromberg
Duchy of Magdeburg	1680	Succession based on an entitlement under the Peace of Westphalia

== Religion and immigration ==
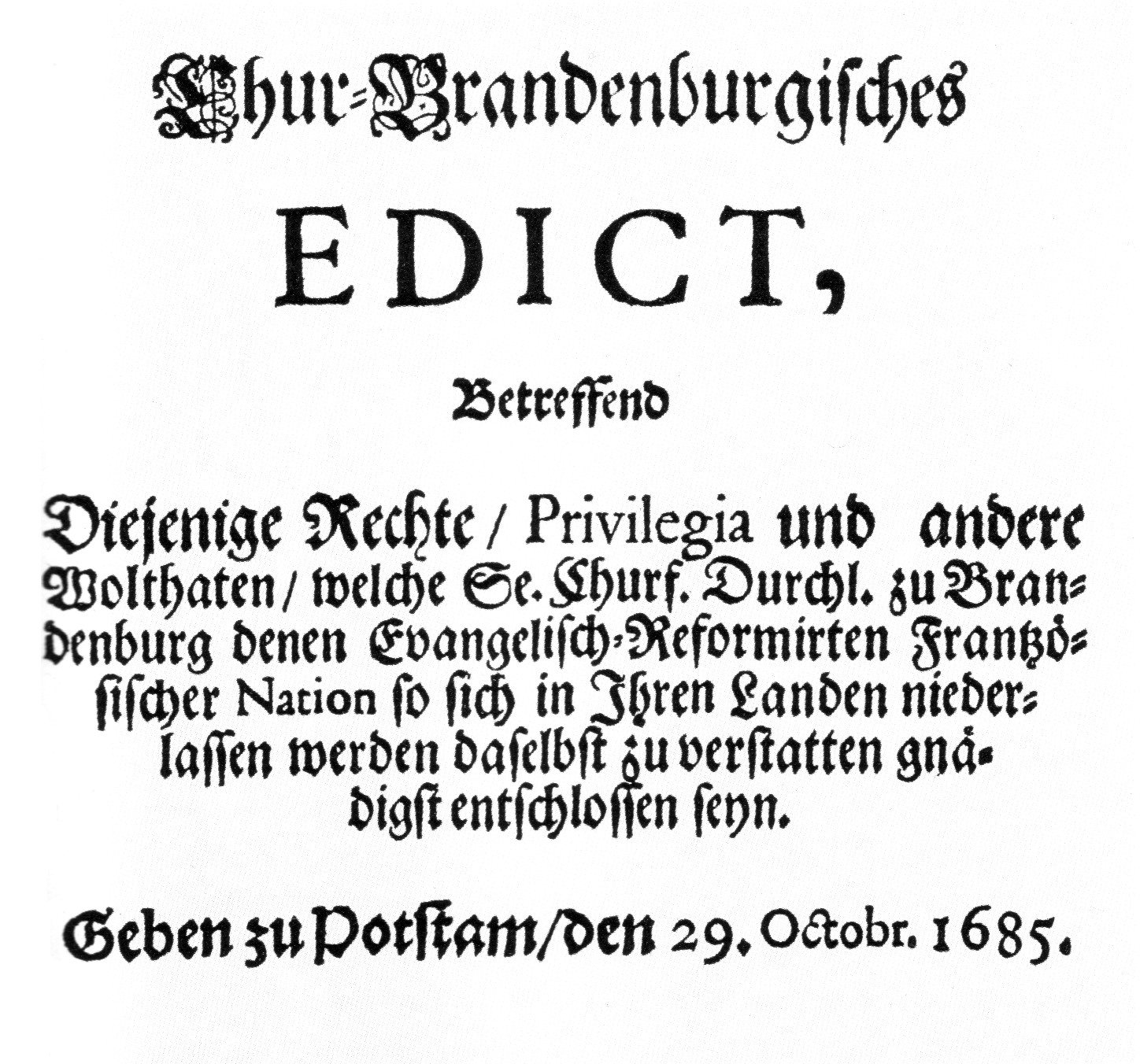
Edict of Potsdam

In 1613, John Sigismund converted from Lutheranism to Calvinism, but failed to achieve the conversion of the estates by the rule of cuius regio, eius religio. Thus, on 5 February 1615, he granted the Lutherans religious freedom, while the Elector's court remained largely Calvinist. When Frederick William I rebuilt Brandenburg–Prussia's war-torn economy, he attracted settlers from all Europe, especially by offering religious asylum, most prominently by the Edict of Potsdam which attracted more than 15,000 Huguenots.

== Navy and colonies ==
Brandenburg–Prussia established a navy and colonies during the reign of Frederick William. The "Great Elector" had spent part of his childhood at the Pomeranian court and port cities of Wolgast (1631–1633) and Stettin (1633–1635), and afterwards studied at the Dutch universities of Leyden and The Hague (1635–1638). When Frederick William became elector in 1640, he invited Dutch engineers to Brandenburg, sent Brandenburgian engineers to study in the Netherlands, and in 1646 married educated Louise Henriette of the Dutch House of Orange-Nassau. After the Thirty Years' War, Frederick William tried to acquire finances to rebuild the country by participating in oversea trade, and attempted to found a Brandenburg–Prussian East Indies Company. He engaged former Dutch admiral Aernoult Gijsels van Lier as advisor and tried to persuade the Holy Roman Emperor and princes of the empire to participate. The emperor, however, declined the request as he considered it dangerous to disturb the interests of the other European powers. In 1651, Frederick William bought Danish Fort Dansborg and Tranquebar for 120,000 reichstalers. As Frederick William was unable to raise this sum, he asked several people and Hanseatic towns to invest in the project, but since none of these were able or willing to give sufficient money, the treaty with Denmark was nullified in 1653.

=== Navy ===
Brandenburg–Prussian navy
Vessel type	Count					
Vessel type	1675	1680	1684	1689	1696	1700
frigate	6	15	16	12	6	4
fluyt	1	0	3	4	2	0
snow	0	1	5	4	1	0
galiote	0	5	4	2	1	0
yacht	1	4	4	5	5	5
other	1	1	2	1	4	3
Source: van der Heyden (2001), p. 17. Total number of European ships in 1669: 25,000; Total number of Dutch ships in 1669: 16,000; Source: van der Heyden (2001), p. 21.

In 1675, after the victory at Fehrbellin and the Brandenburg–Prussian advance in Swedish Pomerania during the Scanian War, Frederick William decided to establish a navy. He engaged Dutch merchant and shipowner Benjamin Raule as his advisor, who, after a first personal meeting with Frederick William in 1675, settled in Brandenburg in 1676 and became the major figure of Brandenburg–Prussia's emerging naval and colonial enterprise. The Brandenburg–Prussian navy was established from ten ships which Frederick William leased from Raule, and achieved first successes in the war against Sweden supporting the siege of Stralsund and Stettin and the invasion of Rügen. In Pillau (now Baltiysk) on the East Prussian coast, Raule established shipyards and enlarged the port facilities.

After the Treaty of Saint-Germain-en-Laye (1679), the navy was used to hijack Swedish ships in the Baltic Sea, and in 1680, six Brandenburg–Prussian vessels captured the Spanish vessel Carolus Secundus near Ostend to pressure Spain to pay promised subsidies. The Spanish ship was renamed Markgraf von Brandenburg ("Margrave of Brandenburg") and became the flagship of an Atlantic fleet that was ordered to capture Spanish vessels carrying silver; it was not successful in this mission. In the following years, the navy was expanded, and the policy of leasing ships was replaced by the policy of building or purchasing them. On 1 October 1684, Frederick William bought all ships that had been leased for 110,000 talers. Also in 1684, the East Frisian port of Emden replaced Pillau as the main Brandenburg–Prussian naval base. From Pillau, part of the shipyard, the admiral's house and the wooden church of the employees were transferred to Emden. While Emden was not part of Brandenburg–Prussia, the elector owned a nearby castle, Greetsiel, and negotiated an agreement with the town to maintain a garrison and a port.

=== West African Gold Coast (Großfriedrichsburg) ===
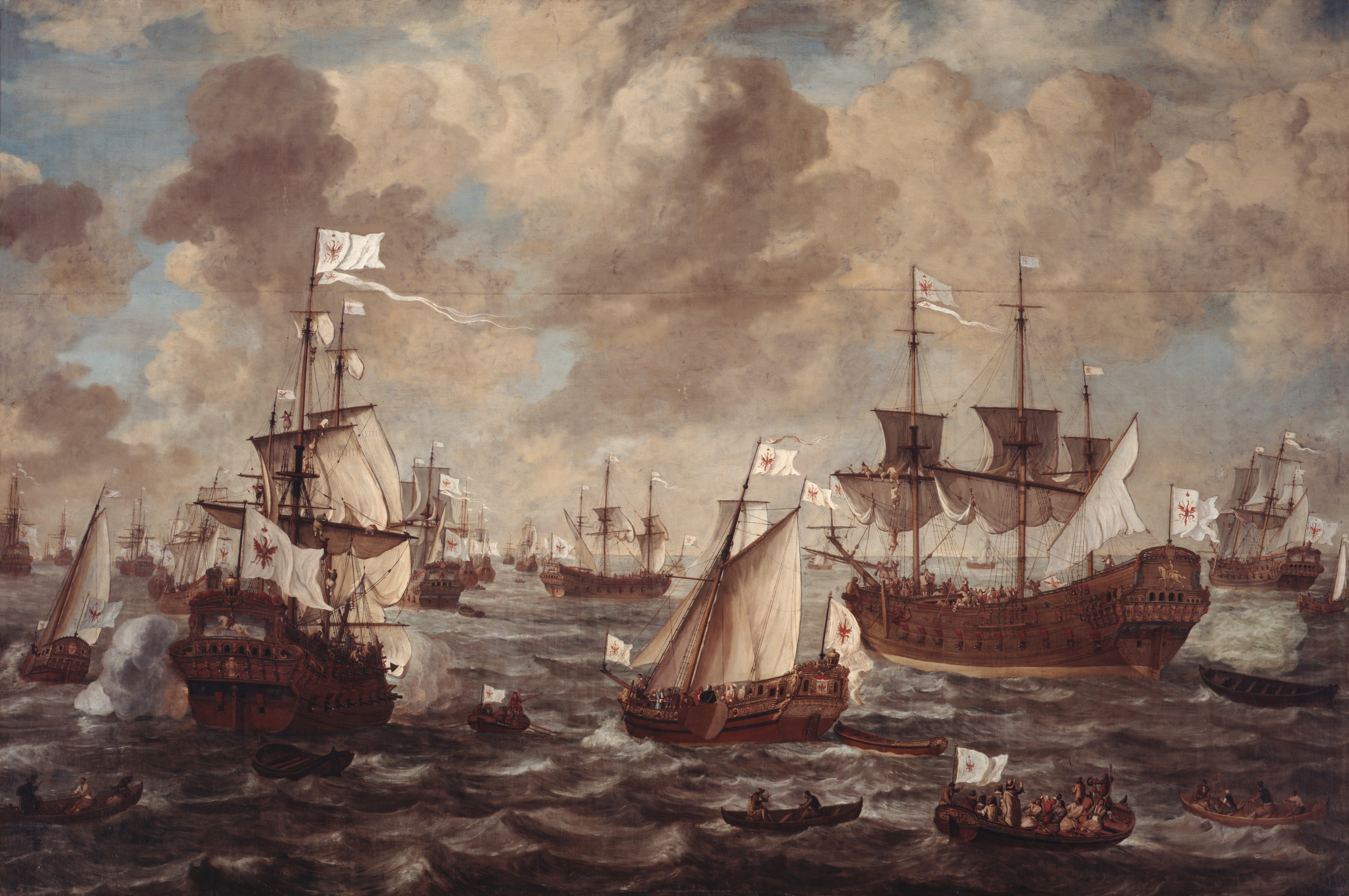
1684 painting of the Brandenburg Navy

In 1679, Raule presented Frederick William a plan to establish colonies in African Guinea, and the elector approved. In July 1680, Frederick William issued respective orders, and two ships were selected to establish trade contacts with African tribes and explore places where colonies could be established. On 17 September, frigate Wappen von Brandenburg ("Seal of Brandenburg") and Morian (poetic for "Mohr", "Negro") left for Guinea. The ships reached Guinea in January 1681. Since the crew of the Wappen von Brandenburg sold a barrel of brandy to Africans in a territory claimed by the Dutch West Indies Company, the latter confiscated the ship in March. The crew of the remaining ship Morian managed to have three Guinean chieftains sign a contract on 16 May, before the Dutch expelled the vessel from the coastal waters. This treaty, officially declared as trade agreement, included a clause of subjection of the chiefs to Frederick William's overlordship and an agreement allowing Brandenburg–Prussia to establish a fort, and is thus regarded the beginning of the Brandenburg–Prussian colonial era.

To facilitate the colonial expeditions, the Brandenburg African Company was founded on 7 March 1682, initially with its headquarters in Berlin and its shipyards in Pillau, since 1683 in Emden. Throughout its existence, the company was underfunded, and expeditions were financed also by private capital, including payments by Raule and Frederick William. In July 1682, an expedition under East Prussian Otto Friedrich von der Groeben was sent to Guinea to erect the fortress Großfriedrichsburg. On 24 February 1684, another treaty with indigenous chiefs was signed that allowed the erection of a second fort in nearby Accada (now Akwidaa), named Dorotheenschanze after Frederick William's second wife. On 4 February 1685, a treaty was signed with the chiefs of Taccararay (now Sekondi-Takoradi), some 30 kilometers east of Großfriedrichsburg. A fourth fort was built at a spring near the village of Taccrama, between Großfriedrichsburg and Dorotheenschanze, named Loge or Sophie-Louise-Schanze. Overall, the colony comprised roughly 50 kilometers of coastline, and did not extend into the hinterland.

=== Arguin ===
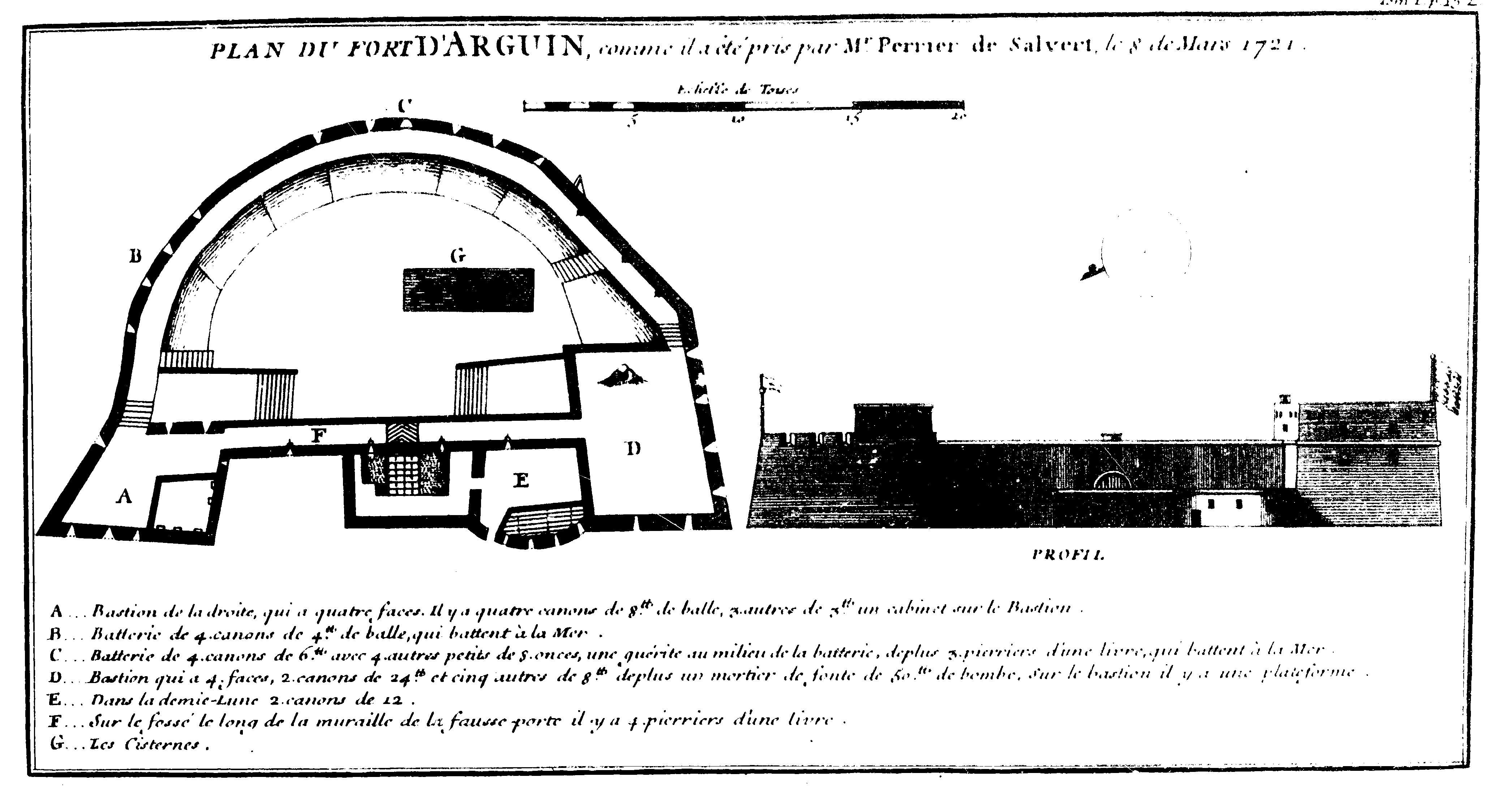
Fort Arguin (1721)

A second colony was established at the Arguin archipelago off the West African coast (now part of Mauritania). In contrast to the Guinean colony, Arguin had been a colony before: in 1520, Portugal had built a fort on the main island, which with all of Portugal came under Spanish control in 1580. In 1638, it was conquered by the Dutch Republic, and in 1678 by France, who due to high maintenance costs abandoned it and demolished the fort soon after. On 27 July 1685, an expedition was mounted by Frederick William and Raule, who took possession of the vacated colony on 1 October. Subsequently, the fort was rebuilt and contact with the indigenous population was established. France was alarmed and sent a vessel to re-conquer the fort in late 1687, but the attack of a French frigate and a smaller vessel was beaten back by the Brandenburg–Prussian garrison. The victory improved the relations to the indigenous people, many of whom were carried off as slaves by the French before. While Arguin did not reach the economic importance of Großfriedrichsburg, it temporarily advanced to the world's primary staple port for slaves.

=== Caribbean ===
The African colonies enabled Brandenburg–Prussia to participate in the Triangular trade, yet it lacked its own trading post in the Caribbean Sea. In 1684, Brandenburg–Prussia was denied the purchase of the French islands Sainte Croix and Saint Vincent. In November 1685, after a failed attempt to purchase Saint Thomas from Denmark–Norway, a Brandenburg–Danish agreement was reached that allowed the Brandenburg African Company to rent part of Saint Thomas as a base for 30 years, while the sovereignty remained with Denmark and administration with the Danish West Indies and Guinean Company. The first Brandenburgian vessel arrived in 1686 with 450 slaves from Großfriedrichsburg. Brandenburg–Prussia was allotted an area near the capital city Charlotte Amalie, called Brandenburgery, and other territories named Krum Bay and Bordeaux Estates further west. In 1688, 300 Europeans and several hundred slaves lived on the Brandenburgian estates. In November 1695, French forces looted the Brandenburgian (not the Danish) colony. In 1731, the Brandenburg–Prussian company on Saint Thomas (BAAC) became insolvent, and abandoned the island in 1735. Their last remains were sold by auction in 1738.

Brandenburg–Prussia tried to claim Crab Island in 1687, but the island was also claimed by other European powers beforehand, and when a second expedition in 1692 found the island under Danish control, the plan was abandoned. In 1689, Brandenburg–Prussia claimed Peter Island, but the small rock proved unsuitable for trade or settlement. In 1691, Brandenburg–Prussia and the Duchy of Courland agreed on a partition of Tobago, but since Courland later abandoned the territory and thus was no longer present on the island, the agreement was nullified, and negotiations with the English government which had interests in Tobago did not result in an agreement. In 1695, Brandenburg–Prussia attempted to acquire Tortola from England via diplomacy, but the negotiations went nowhere, and were eventually called off. Likewise, England declined an offer to purchase Sint Eustatius in 1697.

== See also ==
- List of rulers of Brandenburg
- List of monarchs of Prussia
- German colonial projects before 1871

== Sources ==
=== Bibliography ===
==== In English ====
- Citino, Robert Michael (2005). The German way of war. From the Thirty Years' War to the Third Reich. Modern war studies. University Press of Kansas. ISBN 0-7006-1410-9.
- Clark, Christopher. Iron Kingdom: The Rise and Downfall of Prussia, 1600–1947 (2008)
- Frost, Robert I (2004). After the Deluge. Poland-Lithuania and the Second Northern War, 1655–1660. Cambridge Studies in Early Modern History. Cambridge University Press. ISBN 0-521-54402-5.
- Gieysztor, Aleksander, Stefan Kieniewicz, Emanuel Rostworowski, Janusz Tazbir, and Henryk Wereszycki. History of Poland. PWN. Warsaw, 1979. ISBN 83-01-00392-8
- Leathes, Stanley Mordaunt; Ward, Adolphus William; Prothero, George Walter, eds. (1964). The Cambridge Modern History. Vol. 1. CUP Archive.
- Gagliardo, John G. (1991). Germany under the Old Regime, 1600–1790. Archived from the original on 27 November 2007 – via Questia.
- Holborn, Hajo. A History of Modern Germany. Vol 2: 1648–1840 (1962)
- Hughes, Michael. Early Modern Germany, 1477–1806 (1992)
- Ogilvie, Sheilagh. Germany: A New Social and Economic History, Vol. 1: 1450–1630 (1995) 416 pp; Germany: A New Social and Economic History, Vol. 2: 1630–1800 (1996), 448 pp.
- Shennan, Margaret (1995). The Rise of Brandenburg-Prussia. Routledge. ISBN 0-415-12938-9.
- Sturdy, David J. (2002). Fractured Europe, 1600–1721. Wiley-Blackwell. p. 59. ISBN 0-631-20513-6.

==== In German ====
- Beier, Brigitte (2007). Die Chronik der Deutschen (in German). wissenmedia. ISBN 978-3-577-14374-5.
- Buchholz, Werner, ed. (1999). Pommern (in German). Siedler. ISBN 3-88680-780-0.
- Carreras, Sandra; Maihold, Günther (2004). Preußen und Lateinamerika. Im Spannungsfeld von Kommerz, Macht und Kultur. Europa-Übersee (in German). Vol. 12. LIT. ISBN 3-8258-6306-9.
- Duchhardt, Heinz (2006). "Friedrich Wilhelm, der Große Kurfürst (1640–1688)". In Kroll, Frank-Lothar (ed.). Preußens Herrscher. Von den ersten Hohenzollern bis Wilhelm II (in German). Beck. pp. 95–112. ISBN 3-406-54129-1.
- Gabel, Helmut (1998). "Altes Reich und europäische Friedensordnung. Aspekte der Friedenssicherung zwischen 1648 und dem Beginn des Holländischen Krieges". In Lademacher, Horst; Groenveld, Simon (eds.). Krieg und Kultur. Die Rezeption von Krieg und Frieden in der Niederländischen Republik und im Deutschen Reich 1568–1648 (in German). Waxmann. pp. 463–480. ISBN 3-89325-575-3.
- Gotthard, Axel (2006). "Zwischen Luthertum und Calvinismus (1598–1640)". In Kroll, Frank-Lothar (ed.). Preußens Herrscher. Von den ersten Hohenzollern bis Wilhelm II (in German). Beck. pp. 74–94. ISBN 3-406-54129-1.
- Hammer, Ulrike (2001). Kurfürstin Luise Henriette. Eine Oranierin als Mittlerin zwischen den Niederlanden und Brandenburg-Preußen. Studien zur Geschichte und Kultur Nordwesteuropas (in German). Vol. 4. Waxmann. ISBN 3-8309-1105-X.
- van der Heyden, Ulrich (2001). Rote Adler an Afrikas Küste. Die brandenburgisch-preussische Kolonie Großfriedrichsburg in Westafrika (in German) (2 ed.). Selignow. ISBN 3-933889-04-9.
- Jähnig, Bernhart (2006). "Die politischen und rechtlichen Außenbeziehungen des Herzogtums Preußen (1525–1660)". In Willoweit, Dietmar; Lemberg, Hans (eds.). Reiche und Territorien in Ostmitteleuropa. Historische Beziehungen und politische Herrschaftslegitimation. Völker, Staaten und Kulturen in Ostmitteleuropa (in German). Vol. 2. Munich: Oldenbourg Wissenschaftsverlag. pp. 51–72. ISBN 3-486-57839-1.
- Klueting, Harm (2003). Reformatio vitae Johann Jakob Fabricius (1618/20-1673). Ein Beitrag zu Konfessionalisierung und Sozialdisziplinierung im Luthertum des 17. Jahrhunderts. Historia profana et ecclesiastica (in German). Vol. 9. LIT. ISBN 3-8258-7051-0.
- Kotulla, Michael (2008). Einführung in die deutsche Verfassungsgeschichte. Vom alten Reich bis Weimar (1495 bis 1933) (in German). Springer. p. 261ff. ISBN 978-3-540-48705-0.
- Materna, Ingo; Adamy, Kurt (1995). Brandenburgische Geschichte (in German). Akademie Verlag. p. 317ff. ISBN 3-05-002508-5.
- Neugebauer, Wolfgang (2006). "Friedrich III./I. (1688–1713)". In Kroll, Frank-Lothar (ed.). Preußens Herrscher. Von den ersten Hohenzollern bis Wilhelm II (in German). Beck. pp. 113–133. ISBN 3-406-54129-1.
- von Neugebauer, Wolfgang, ed. (2009). Das 17. und 18. Jahrhundert und Große Themen der Geschichte Preußens. Handbuch der Preußischen Geschichte (in German). Vol. 1. de Gruyter. ISBN 978-3-11-014091-0.
- Neuhaus, Helmut (2003). Das Reich in der frühen Neuzeit. Enzyklopädie deutscher Geschichte (in German). Vol. 42 (2 ed.). Oldenbourg. ISBN 3-486-56729-2.
- Nicklas, Thomas (2002). Macht oder Recht: frühneuzeitliche Politik im Obersächsischen Reichskreis (in German). Franz Steiner Verlag. p. 214ff. ISBN 3-515-07939-4.
- Olesen, Jens E. (2003). "Christian IV og dansk Pommernpolitik". In Asmus, Ivo; Droste, Jens E.; Olesen (eds.). Gemeinsame Bekannte: Schweden und Deutschland in der Frühen Neuzeit (in Danish). LIT Verlag. pp. 383–396. ISBN 3-8258-7150-9.
- Schmidt, Georg (2006). Der Dreißigjährige Krieg (in German) (7 ed.). C. H. Beck. ISBN 3-406-49034-4.
- Weber, Matthias (2003). Preussen in Ostmitteleuropa. Geschehensgeschichte und Verstehensgeschichte. Schriften des Bundesinstituts für Kultur und Geschichte der Deutschen im östlichen Europa (in German). Vol. 21. Oldenbourg. ISBN 3-486-56718-7.
