= Walter Sadler =

Walter Sadler may refer to:

- Walter C. Sadler, mayor of Ann Arbor, Michigan
- Walter Dendy Sadler, English painter
