= Simmler =

Simmler is a surname. Notable people with the surname include:

- Josias Simmler (Josiah Simler, Simlerus; 1530–1576), Swiss theologian and classicist
- Józef Simmler (1823–1868), Polish painter
- Wilhelm Simmler (1840–1923), German painter and illustrator
