= Themistokles von Eckenbrecher =

German painter

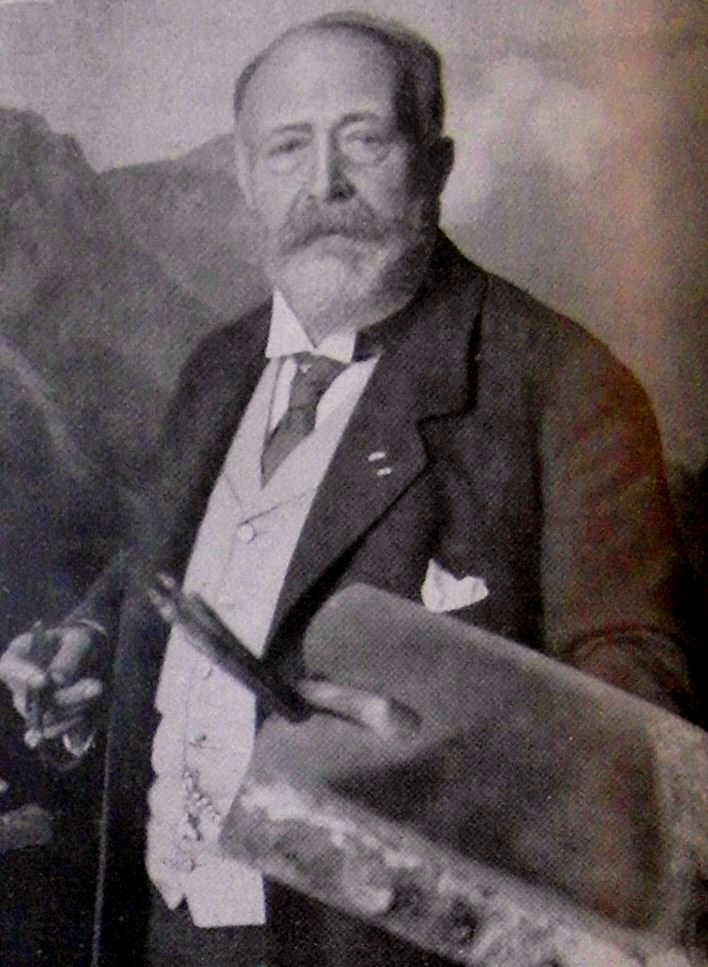
Themistokles von Eckenbrecher (c.1912)

Karl Paul Themistokles von Eckenbrecher (17 November 1842 – 4 December 1921) was a German landscape and marine painter, in the late Romantic style.

== Biography ==
His father was a Prussian military officer, who had originally studied philosophy and medicine. His ethnically Italian mother came from a merchant family in Trieste, Austrian Empire. He was born in Athens while his parents were in Greece, visiting his father's friend, Heinrich Schliemann. In 1843, his family returned to Berlin, where he studied at the English-American school. As he got older, he travelled with his father and was taught by private tutors. It was during this time that he developed an interest in ships.

From 1850 to 1857, they lived in Istanbul, then moved to Potsdam, where they lived until 1861. When he expressed his wish to become a marine painter, his parents supported him and, from 1859 to 1860, he was a student of the court painter, Carl Gustav Wegener. From 1861 to 1867, they lived in Düsseldorf, where he was a private student of Oswald Achenbach. While there, he also became a member of the progressive artists' group known as Malkasten (paintbox).

Despite having married Johanna Stever, the daughter of a landowner from Mecklenburg, in 1875, he was travelling almost continuously; throughout Europe and the Middle East. After a trip to Egypt in 1881, he and his colleague, Wilhelm Simmler, created an Orientalist panorama called "Entry of the Mecca Caravan into Cairo" (118x15 meters, roughly 387x49 feet) for the city of Hamburg.

In addition to his paintings, he designed postcards for the Deutsches Kolonialhaus and various passenger ship companies. In 1892, he went farther afield, visiting the Philippines and German colonies in Africa. He eventually learned how to speak eleven languages.

In 1919, he moved his home base from Berlin to Goslar and died there two years later. A major retrospective and sale of his works was held in 1942. His son, Gustav Heinrich (1876-1935), spent much of his life as a farmer near Okombahe, in what was then South West Africa.

== Selected paintings ==
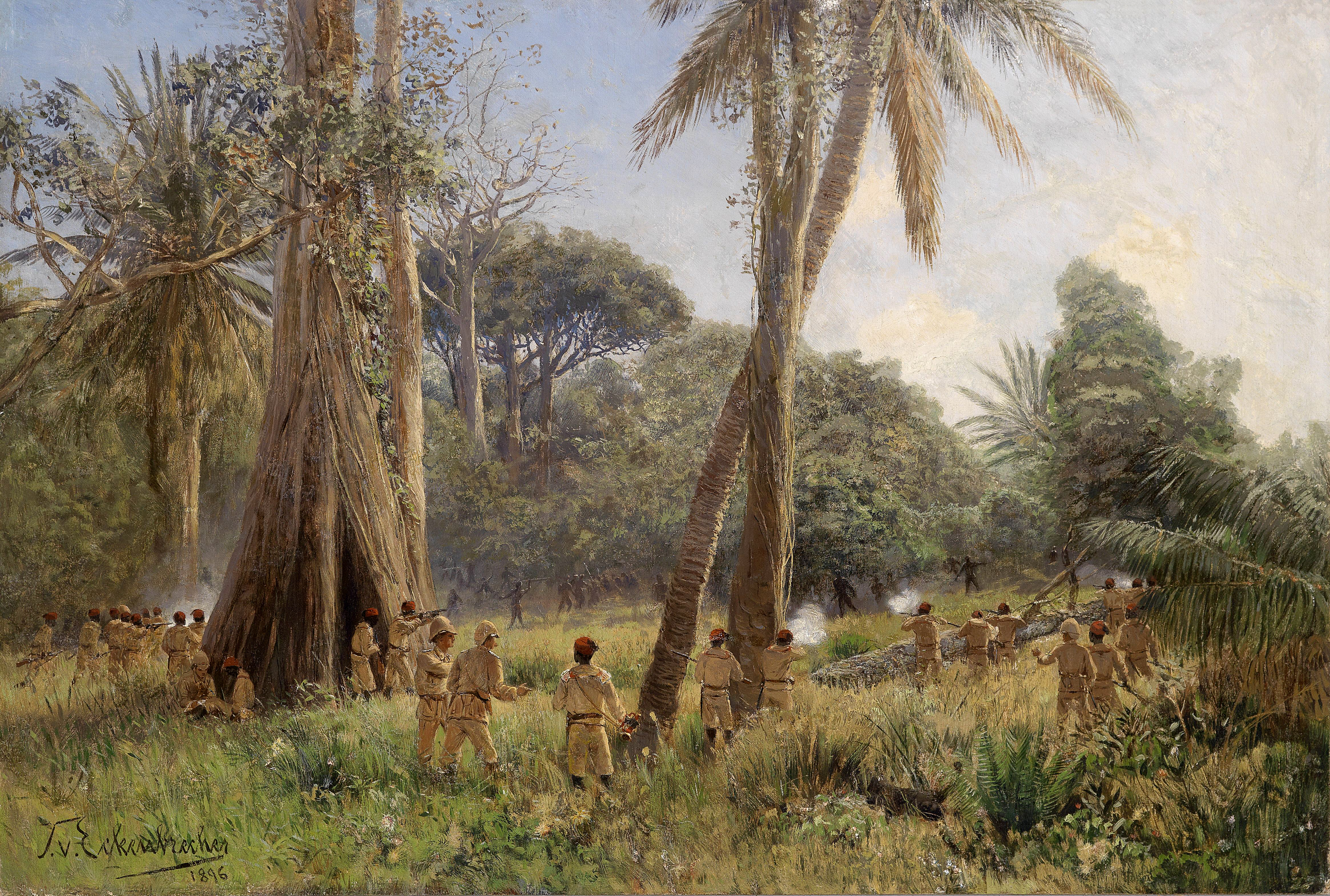
Gun Battle Between the Askari
and Local Inhabitants

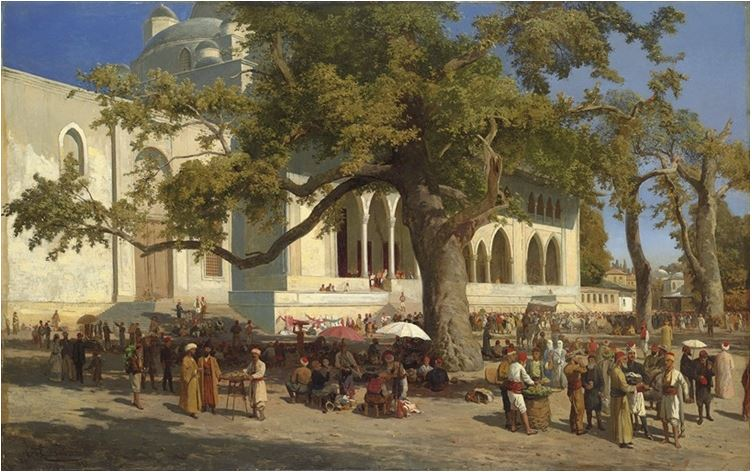
A busy market in the Courtyard of the
New Mosque, Istanbul

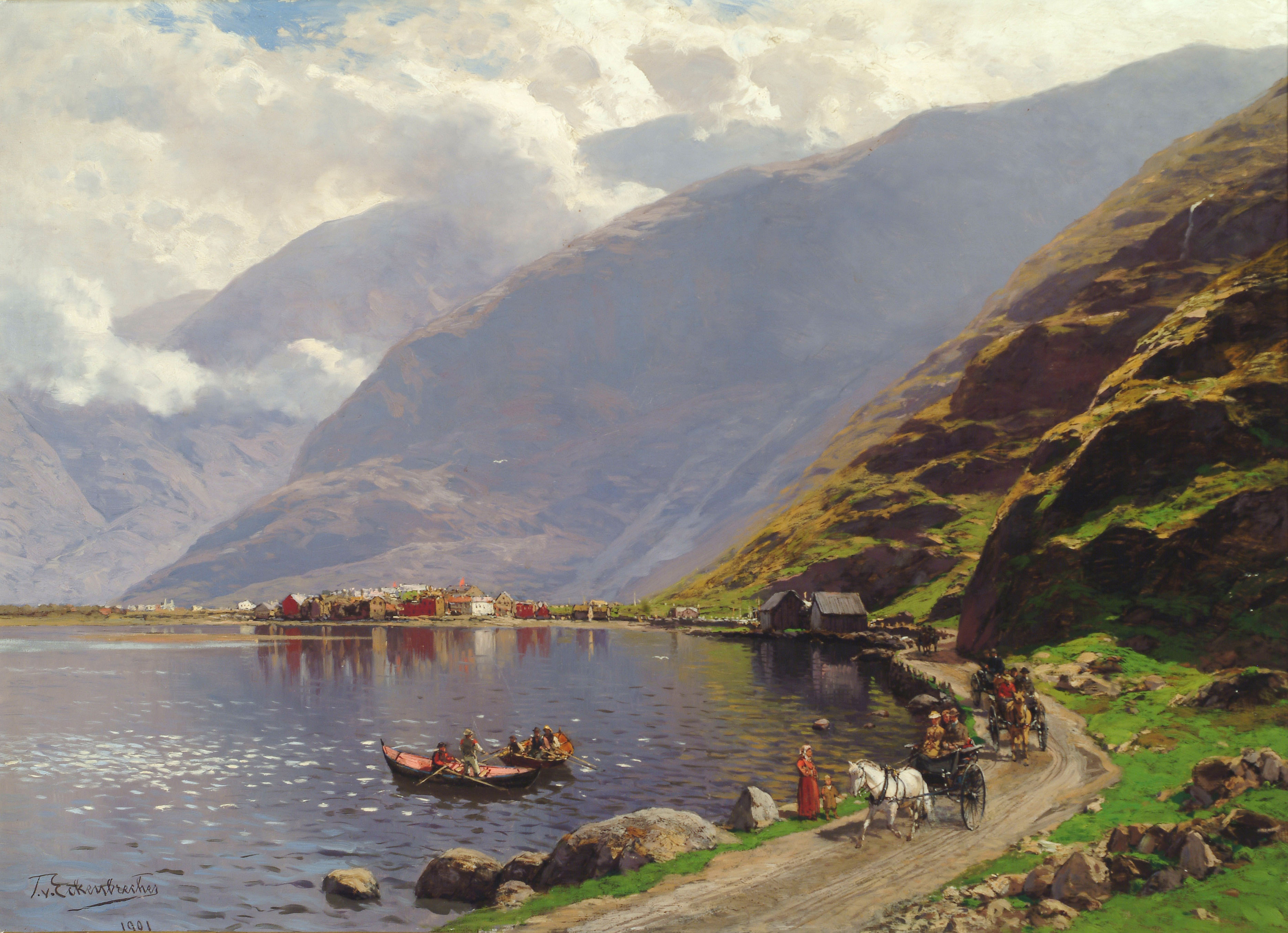
Scenic view of the Sognefjord
