= Siege of Stralsund (1678) =

Siege

- Part of Scanian War
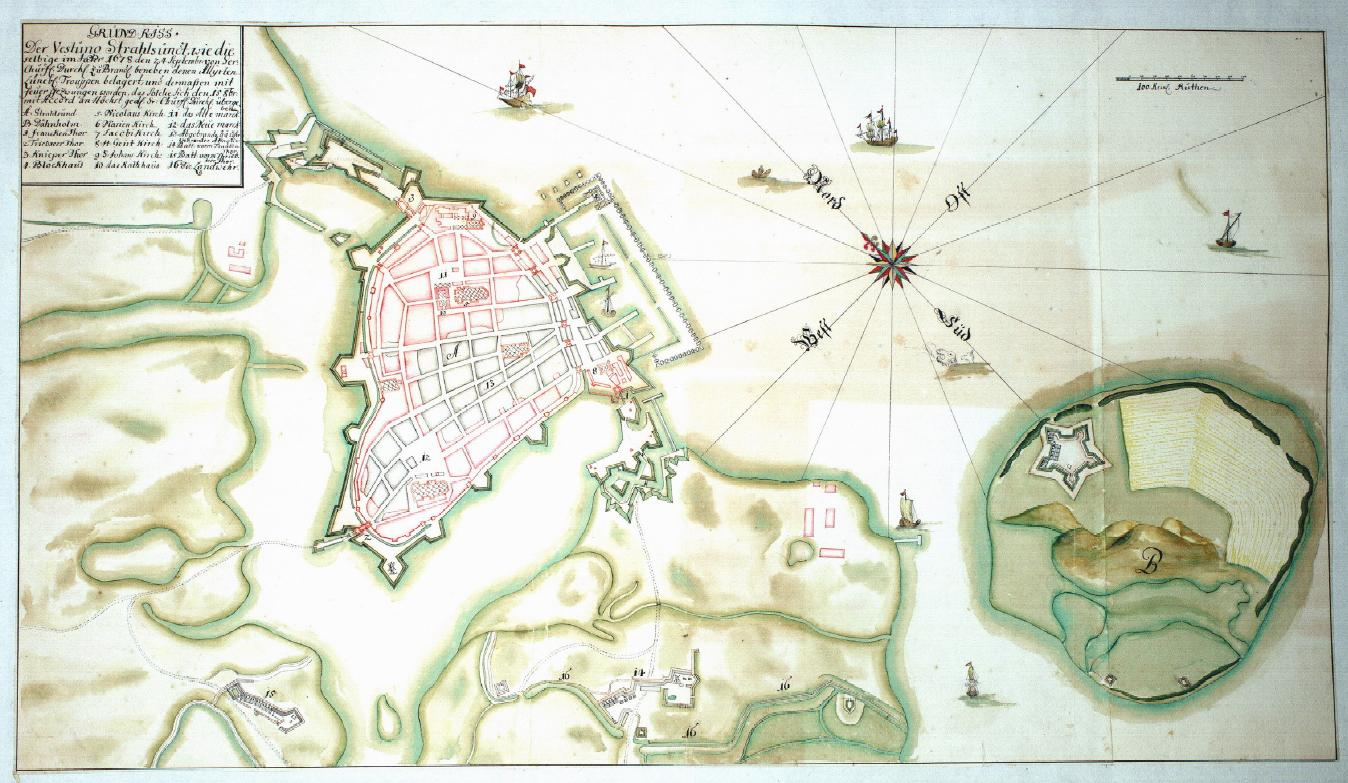
- Plan of Stralsund in 1678
| Date | 20 September – 15 October 1678 |
| Location | Stralsund, Swedish Pomerania (now in Germany) |
| Result | Brandenburg–Prussian victory |
| Territorial changes | Brandenburg–Prussia captures Stralsund |

Belligerents
| Brandenburg-Prussia | (yes) Swedish Empire |

Commanders and leaders
| Frederick William | (Swedish Empire) Otto Wilhelm von Königsmarck |

Strength
| 21,500; 80 guns | 6,000; 154 guns |

The siege of Stralsund was an armed engagement between the Electorate of Brandenburg and the Swedish Empire from 20 September to 15 October 1678, during the Scanian War. After two days of bombardment on 10 and 11 October, the severely devastated Swedish fortress of Stralsund surrendered to the Brandenburgers. The remainder of Swedish Pomerania was taken by the end of the year, yet most of the province including Stralsund was returned to Sweden by the terms of the Treaty of Saint-Germain-en-Laye and the Peace of Lund, both concluded in 1679.

== Prelude ==
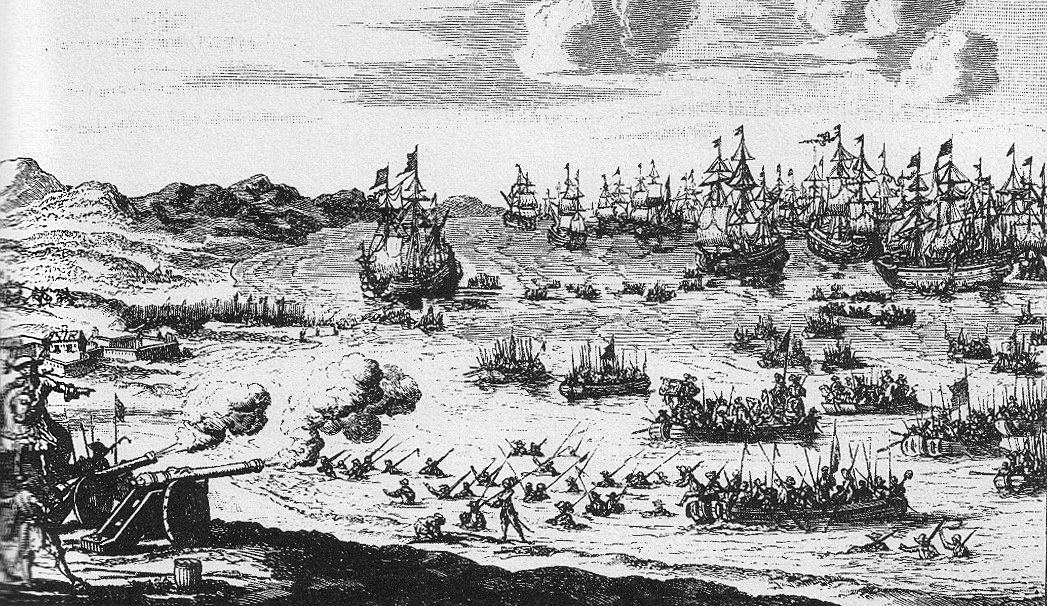
Invasion of Swedish Rügen by Brandenburg, 1678

The Scanian War reached Swedish Pomerania when after the Battle of Fehrbellin (1675) the retreating Swedish forces were pursued by a Brandenburgian army under "Great Elector" Frederick William I's command. Stralsund was one of only two major fortresses Sweden maintained in Pomerania, the other one being Stettin. After the Brandenburgian army had captured Stettin and Wolgast, Stralsund was seriously threatened. In addition, Danish forces had landed on Rügen in 1677, aided by a disloyal Rugian noble.

Thus, all buildings outside the fortifications were levelled in 1677 to strip an imminent Brandenburgian attack of cover. Stralsund then held a population of 8,500, including armed burghers, and close to 5,000 Swedish, German and Finnish foot and horse.

== Siege ==
Frederick William I positioned his artillery south of the town and started bombardment on 10 October 1678. His aim was to force Swedish commander Otto Wilhelm von Königsmarck into surrender by abundantly firing incendiary bombs on the burghers' mansions. The small, newly created Brandenburgian navy also took part in the siege.

Most of the southern half of the town was destroyed when the defendants surrendered the town on 11 October, namely 285 houses, 476 huts, and 194 servant dwellings.

== Aftermath ==
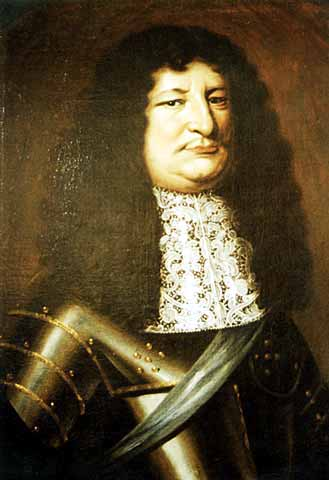
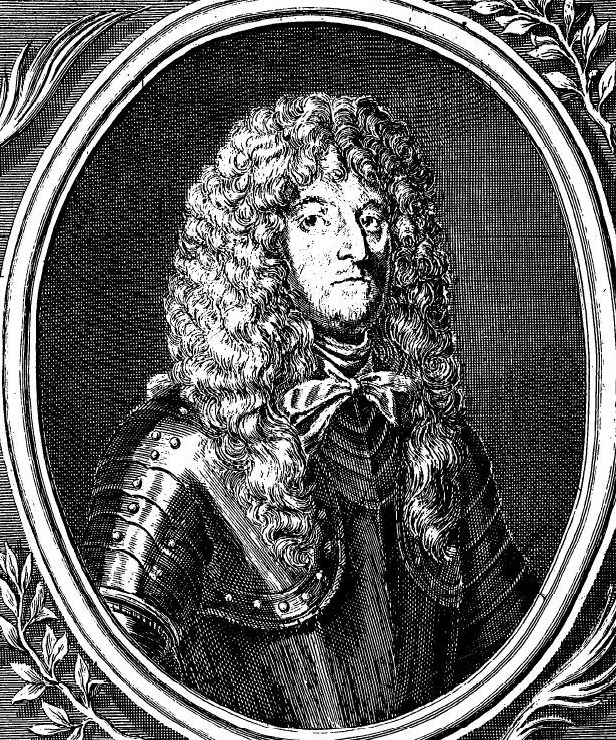
Frederick William I (left) and Königsmarck (right)

Despite great efforts of Frederick William I to win the loyalty of the Swedish Pomeranian population, including generous aid programs to rebuild Stralsund and Stettin, most remained loyal to Sweden. After the fall of Stralsund, there were only few Swedish-held areas left in Swedish Pomerania, all of which Frederick William I had cleared by the end of 1678.

Stralsund was returned to Sweden in the Treaty of Saint-Germain-en-Laye (1679). Due to the devastating bombardment of 1678, as well as another fire on 12 June 1680, the population was reduced to about 6,000, with an additional 2,000 garrisoned Swedes. After the 1680 fire destroyed an additional 48 houses, 89 huts, and 82 servant dwellings, only 205 houses, 408 huts, and 158 servant dwellings were still standing.

== See also ==
- Pomerania during the Early Modern Age
- Brandenburg-Pomeranian conflict

== Sources ==
=== Bibliography ===
- Bohmbach, Jürgen (2003). "Zuviel Geld für Pommern". In Asmus, Ivo; Droste, Heiko; Olesen, Jens E. (eds.). Gemeinsame Bekannte: Schweden und Deutschland in der Frühen Neuzeit (in German). Berlin-Hamburg-Münster: LIT Verlag. ISBN 3-8258-7150-9.
- Grabinsky, Anne (2006). "Die Stralsunder Doppelkatastrophe von 1678/80: Wiederaufbau nach zwei vernichtenden Stadtbränden". Kleine Stadtgeschichte (in German). Vol. II. Berlin-Hamburg-Münster: LIT Verlag. ISBN 3-8258-8994-7.
- Langer, Herbert (2003). "Die Anfänge des Garnisionswesens in Pommern". In Asmus, Ivo; Droste, Heiko; Olesen, Jens E. (eds.). Gemeinsame Bekannte: Schweden und Deutschland in der Frühen Neuzeit (in German). Berlin-Hamburg-Münster: LIT Verlag. ISBN 3-8258-7150-9.
- Lorenz, Maren (2003). "Schwedisches Militär und seine Justiz". In Asmus, Ivo; Droste, Heiko; Olesen, Jens E. (eds.). Gemeinsame Bekannte: Schweden und Deutschland in der Frühen Neuzeit (in German). Berlin-Hamburg-Münster: LIT Verlag. ISBN 3-8258-7150-9.
- van der Heyden, Ulrich (2001). Rote Adler an Afrikas Küste: die brandenburgisch-preussische Kolonie Grossfriedrichsburg in Westafrika (in German) (2 ed.). Selignow. ISBN 3-933889-04-9.
- Kroll, Stefan; Gyula Pápay (2003). "Wohnen und Wirtschaften in Stralsund um 1700". Stadtgeschichte und Historische Informationssysteme: der Ostseeraum im 17. und 18. Jahrhundert (in German) (2 ed.). Berlin-Hamburg-Münster: LIT Verlag. ISBN 3-8258-7103-7.
- Markfort, Ursula (2006). Stefan Kroll, Kersten Krüger (ed.). Städtesystem und Urbanisierung im Ostseeraum in der Frühen Neuzeit: urbane Lebensräume und historische Informationssysteme (in German). Berlin-Hamburg-Münster: LIT Verlag. ISBN 3-8258-8778-2.
- Meier, Martin (2008). Vorpommern nördlich der Peene unter dänischer Verwaltung 1715 bis 1721: Aufbau einer Verwaltung und Herrschaftssicherung in einem eroberten Gebiet (in German). Oldenbourg Wissenschaftsverlag. ISBN 978-3-486-58285-7.
- Rystad, Göran (2001). Karl XI: en biografi (in Swedish). Historiska Media. ISBN 91-89442-27-X.
