= Walter Dendy Sadler =

English painter

Walter Dendy Sadler (12 May 1854 – 13 November 1923) was an English painter.

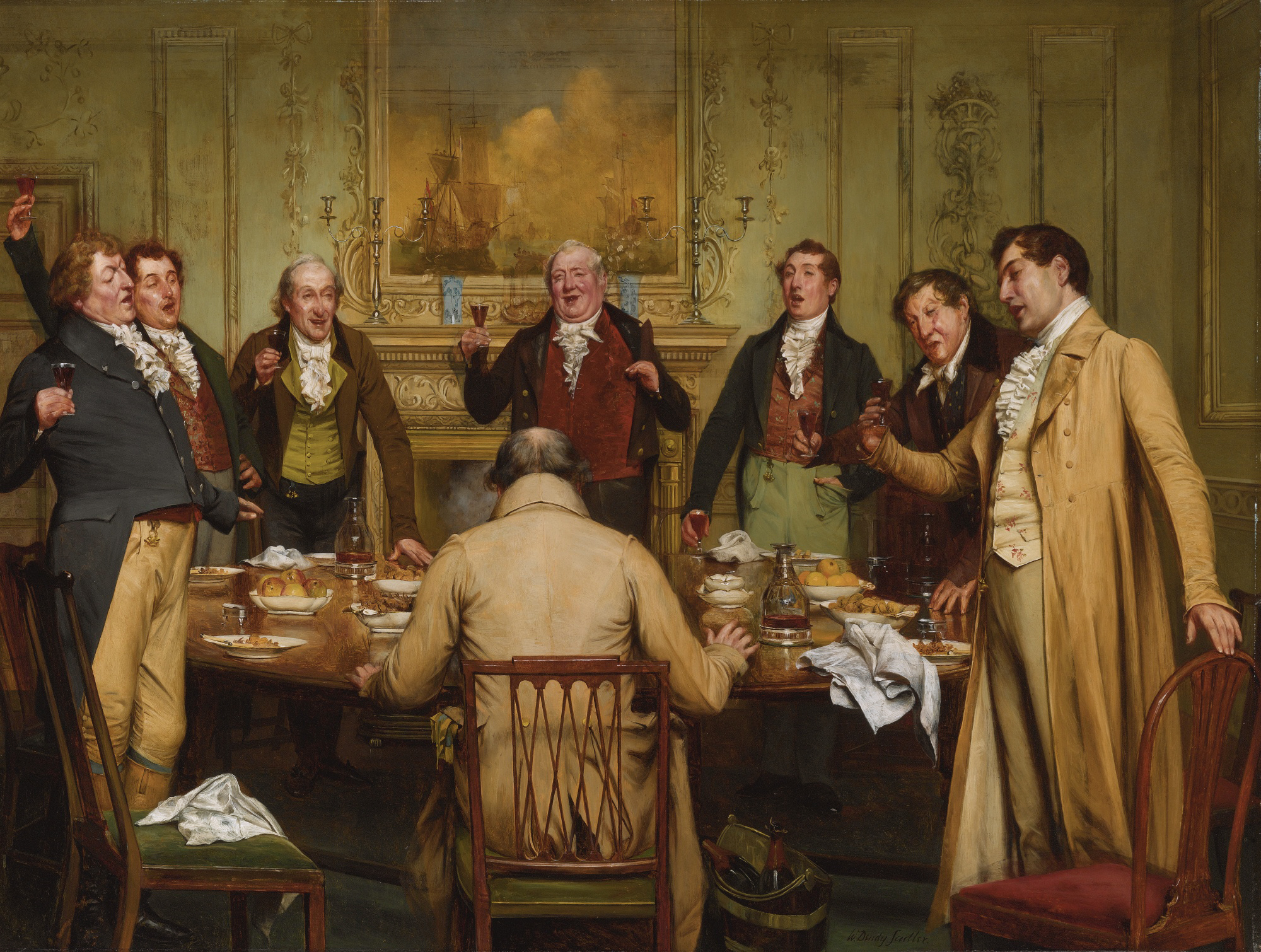
For he's a jolly good fellow and so say all of us.

Walter Dendy Sadler was born in Dorking, a market town in Surrey in southern England, and brought up in Horsham, West Sussex, England. At age 16 he decided to become a painter and enrolled for two years at Heatherly's School of Art in London, subsequently studying in Germany under Burfield and Wilhelm Simmler. In 1897 Sadler moved to Hemingford Grey, Huntingdonshire, where he died 13 November 1923, aged 69.

He exhibited at the Dudley Gallery from 1872 and at the Royal Academy from the following year through to the 1890s. He was a member of the RBA, he also exhibited at the RA (Royal Academy). He painted contemporary people in domestic and daily life pursuits, showing them with comical expressions illustrating their greed, stupidity etc. His subjects were usually set in the late eighteenth or early nineteenth centuries with sentimental, romantic and humorous themes. Before painting a scene he would create elaborate settings in which local villagers would often pose as models. Indeed, as he often used the same props and models, these can sometimes be seen repeated in successive paintings in different guises. The home, the inn, the lawyers office, the garden and the golf course all provide subjects for his wit and clever social observation.

A number of his paintings are in museum collections.

On 21 October 2000 Sadler's painting, 'London to York - Time's Up Gentlemen' was sold by Sotheby's New York for $198,250.
