= Wilhelm Simmler =

German painter

Wilhelm Carl Melchior Simmler (6 September 1840 – 8 December 1923) was a German painter and illustrator of the Düsseldorf school of painting.

== Family ==
Born in Geisenheim, Simmler was one of nine children of the painter Friedrich Simmler (1801–1872). His siblings Joseph Simmler (1842-1899), Franz Joseph Simmler (1846-1926) and Antonia Simmler (1852-1923) were also artistically active.

== Life ==
Simmler was born in the Rheingau. From 1856 to 1861 he studied at the Kunstakademie Düsseldorf. There, he was a student of Emil Hünten, Karl Ferdinand Sohn, Friedrich Wilhelm von Schadow, Christian Köhler and Eduard Bendemann, among others. After intermediate stays in Munich from 1861 to 1863, he mainly stayed in Düsseldorf from 1869 onwards. His private pupil from 1871 to 1875 was the British genre painter Walter Dendy Sadler. Simmler was a member of the Malkasten. After several commissions, including in Hamburg and Berlin, he finally moved to Berlin in 1891, where he remained a member of the Verein Berliner Künstler until his death.

== Work ==
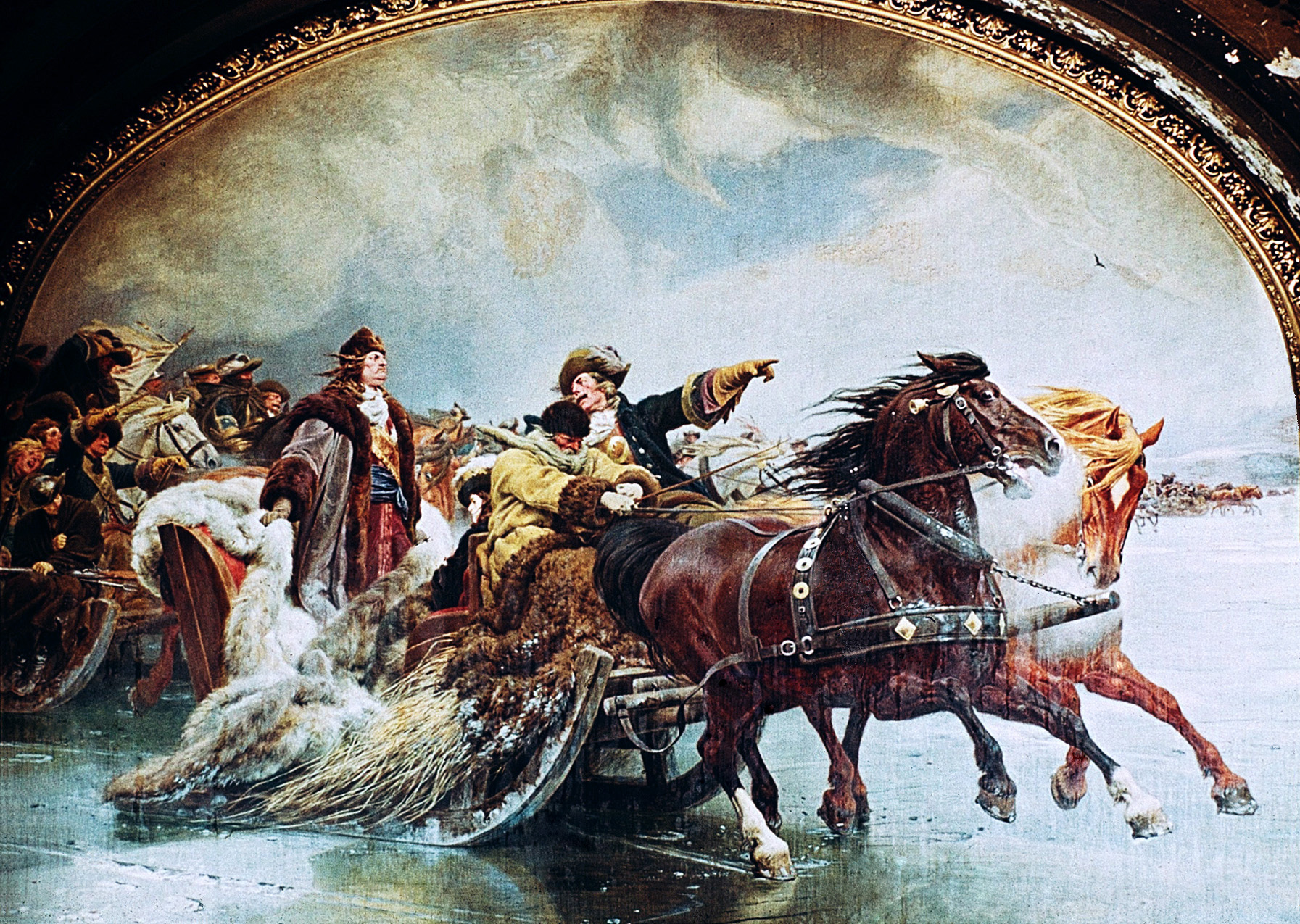
Mural Übergang über das Kurische Haff, 1891

He stood out especially for his history painting, genre painting and hunting motifs, which marked him out as a successful artist even during his lifetime. From 1862, he was represented at exhibitions in Berlin, Düsseldorf and Berlin. In later years, he painted panoramas and mural paintings. In collaboration with Emil Hünten, Simmler produced the Panorama of the Storm on St. Privat for the Berlin panorama rotunda "Nationalpanorama" in Herwarthstraße, which opened in February 1881. In 1883, the panorama was removed and later still shown in Cologne and Hamburg. This was followed in 1882 by the Orient Panorama "Entry of the Mecca Caravan into Cairo" by Simmler and Themistokles von Eckenbrecher (118 × 15 metres) for the city of Hamburg. For the Ruhmeshalle Berlin he completed around 1891, he produced the mural Übergang über das Kurische Haff vom 19. Januar 1679, which was destroyed by a bomb hit during the Second World War in 1944.

Simmler also produced illustrations for children's and youth books such as the originals of the colour prints for an edition of The Adventures of Baron von Münchhausen by Gottfried August Bürger.
