= Bogusław I of Pomerania =

12th-century Duke of Pomerania

Bogusław I
- Duke of Pomerania
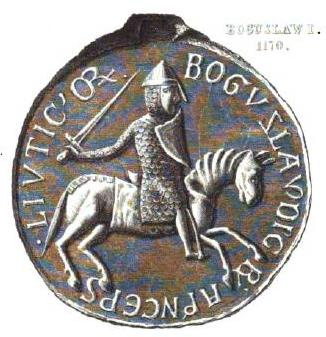
- Bogusław's seal, c. 1170
- Born: c. 1130
- Died: 18 March 1187; Sosnitza, Pomerania
- Buried: Usedom Abbey
- Noble family: House of Griffin
- Spouses: Walburgis of Denmark; Anastasia of Greater Poland
- Issue Detail: Wartislaw II, Duke of Pomerania; Bogislaw II, Duke of Pomerania; Casimir II, Duke of Pomerania
- Father: Wartislaw I, Duke of Pomerania

Bogusław I (also Bogislaw and Boguslaus; c. 1130 – 18 March 1187), a member of the House of Griffin, was Duke of Pomerania from 1156 until his death. In 1181 he received the "Duchy of Slavinia" as a fief from Emperor Frederick Barbarossa.

== Life ==
Bogusław and his younger brother Casimir were sons of Duke Wartislaw I of Pomerania, the progenitor of the Griffin dynasty, probably from his second marriage with the Danish princess Ida. Minors upon their father's violent death, both first had to cede the rule to their uncle Ratibor. After Duke Ratibor died in 1156, his nephews Bogusław and Casimir ruled the Duchy of Pomerania jointly.

In 1164, the brothers allied with the Obotrite prince Pribislav of Mecklenburg and supported his revolt against the Saxon duke Henry the Lion. They were defeated in the Battle of Verchen, but allowed to keep their duchy as a fief from Henry. As his loyal vassals, Bogusław and his brother participated in the defeat of the Rani principality on the island of Rügen in 1168, led by the allied King Valdemar I of Denmark, and suffered another defeat at the battle at Julin Bridge in 1170. As neither Henry nor the Pomeranian dukes received any rewards from Valdemar, a lengthy conflict followed whereby Danish forces repeatedly plundered the Griffin estates. Peace was made in 1177, won by the payment of large tributes to the Danish king.

When Casimir was killed in 1180, presumably fighting against the invading troops of the Ascanian margrave Otto I of Brandenburg at Demmin, Bogusław went on to rule the Pomeranian duchy alone. One year later, Emperor Barbarossa, who had overthrown his revolting Welf rival Henry the Lion, granted Bogusław the Duchy of Slavinia (Slawia) as a fief. The duchy's territory as well as Bogusław's status as a Prince of the Holy Roman Empire remains uncertain.

The conflicts with Denmark continued, when in 1184 Bogusław campaigned against the Danish Principality of Rügen on the Emperor's behalf. Yet, this failed, when the Pomeranian navy was sunk in the Bay of Greifswald. After several counterattacks, Bogusław had to submit and take his duchy as a fief from King Canute VI of Denmark in 1185.

Duke Bogusław died in 1187 and was buried in Usedom Abbey. He was succeeded by his surviving sons Bogusław II (c. 1177 – 1220) and Casimir II. In 1238, Pope Gregory IX wrote about Bogusław duce Cassubie (Gerard Labuda, 2006).

== Marriage and children ==
He was first married to Walburgis of Denmark (d. 1177), daughter of King Valdemar I of Denmark and Sophia of Minsk, and secondly to Anastasia of Greater Poland, daughter of Mieszko III, Duke of Greater Poland and Eudoxia of Kiev. He had altogether 5 children.

With Walburgis of Denmark:

- Ratibor of Pomerania (1160–1183)
- Wartislaw II, Duke of Pomerania (1160–1184)

With Anastasia of Greater Poland:

- Bogislaw II, Duke of Pomerania (c. 1177 – 1220) married Miroslawa of Pomerelia (d. 1233), the daughter of Mestwin I of Pomerelia and Swinislawa.
- Casimir II, Duke of Pomerania (c. 1180 – 1219), married Ingardis of Denmark.
- Dobroslawa of Pomerania (before 1187 – c. 1226)

== See also ==
- List of Pomeranian duchies and dukes
- History of Pomerania
- Duchy of Pomerania
- House of Griffins

Bogusław I of Pomerania House of Griffins Born: c. 1130 Died: March 18, 1187
Preceded by Ratibor I	Duke of Pomerania-Stettin; 1156–1187	Succeeded by Bogusław II
