= Ingrid of Denmark =

Ingrid of Denmark may refer to:

- Ingerid of Denmark (d. after 1093), daughter of Sweyn II of Denmark and queen consort of Olaf III of Norway
- Ingrid Ragnvaldsdotter (1100 or 1110 – after 1161), wife of Danish prince Henrik Skadelår
- Queen Ingrid of Denmark (1910–2000), queen consort of Frederik IX of Denmark

== See also ==
- Ingard of Denmark (d. 1236), duchess consort of Casimir II of Pomerania
