= Casimir I =

Casimir I may refer to:

- Casimir I of Poland (1016–1058), duke of Poland
- Casimir I, Duke of Pomerania (after 1130 – 1180), duke of Pomerania-Demmin
- Casimir I, Duke of Cieszyn (1280/90 – 1358)
