= Wartislaw II =

Wartislaw
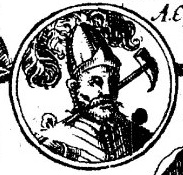
- Warcislaus II, Duke of Pomerania

Duke of Pomerania-Demmin
- Tenure: 1180–1184
- Predecessor: Casimir I
- Successor: Casimir II
- Born: c. 1160
- Died: c. 1184
- Spouse: Sofia of Poland
- House: Griffin
- Father: Bogislaw I, Duke of Pomerania
- Mother: Walburga of Denmark

Wartislaw II (c. 1160 – c. 1184) was a duke of Pomerania-Demmin. He either was a son of Bogislaw I and Walburga of Denmark, or Wartislaw of the Swantiboride sideline of the Griffins, castellan of Szczecin.

Wartislaw II was a son of Bogislaw I, duke of Pomerania-Stettin and his first wife Walburga of Denmark. He was married to Sophia of Poland, yet they had no children. Wartislaw received Pomerania-Demmin after Casimir I of Pomerania-Demmin died in 1180.

This version is challenged by Adolf Hofmeister (1883–1956), who states that he has been confused with the Swantiboride castellan of Szczecin, Wartislaw (Wartislaw Swantiboricz or Swantiboriz), who is known to have been one of the legal guardians of Casimir II, who would be the next duke to rule Pomerania-Demmin.

Wartislaw II House of Pomerania Born: ~ 1160 Died: ~ 1184
Preceded by Casimir I	Duke of Pomerania-Demmin; 1180–1184	Succeeded by Casimir II

== See also ==
- List of Pomeranian duchies and dukes
- History of Pomerania
- Duchy of Pomerania
- House of Pomerania

== Sources ==
1. Wegener, W: Die Herzöge von Pommern aus dem Greifen-Hause ca. 1100 bis 1637 (Genealogische Tafeln zur mittelalterlichen Geschichte, 3), 2. Auflage Göttingen 1962.
