= Wartislaw Swantibor =

Wartislaw II of Szczecin
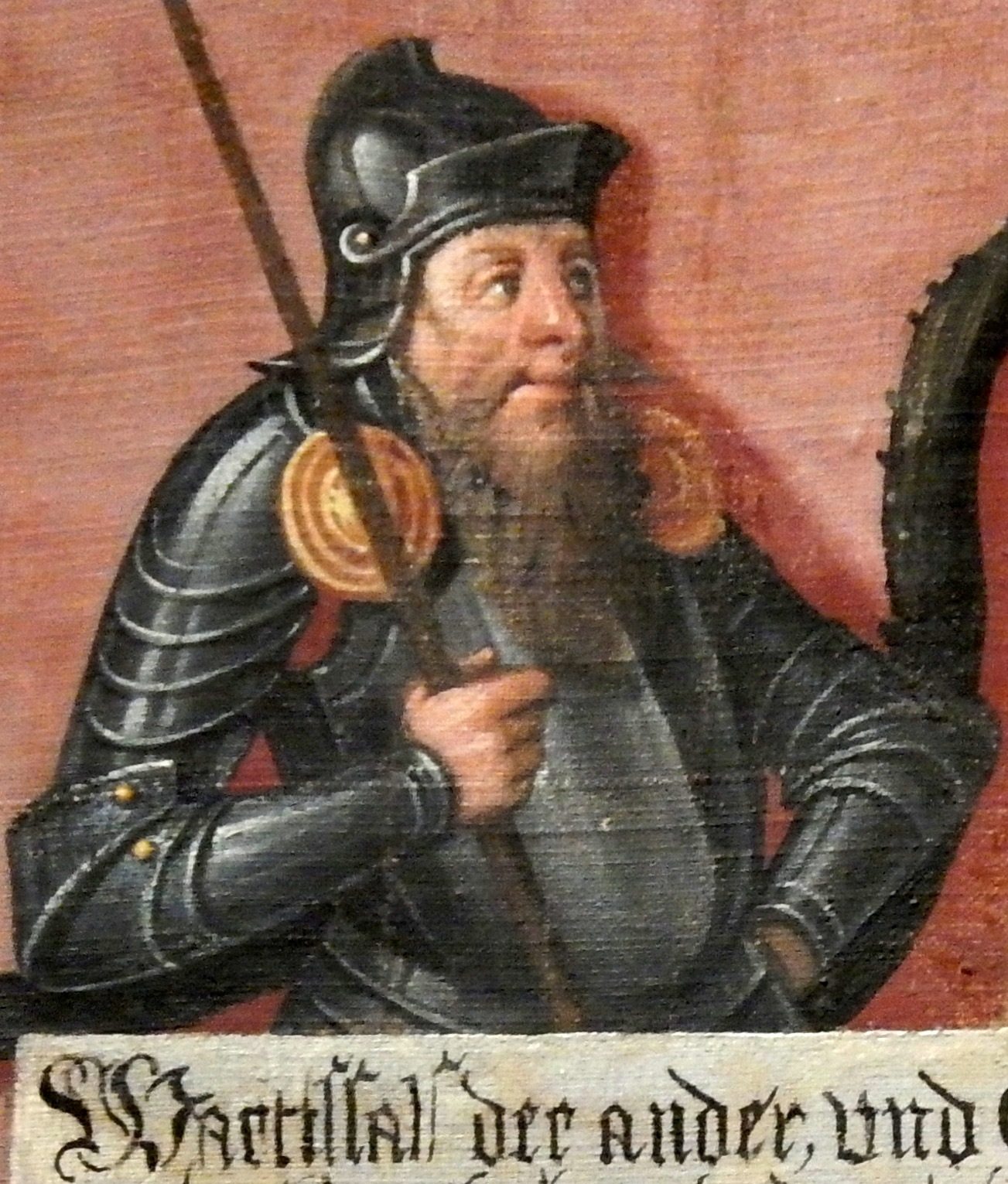
- Died: 1196
- Noble family: House of Griffins
- Father: Swantibor I

Wartislaw II Swantibor, also known as Wartislaw the Younger or Wartislaw Swantiboritz (d. 1196) was a member of a cadet line of the House of Griffins, who ruled the Duchy of Pomerania. Wartislaw II was Castellan of Szczecin. He is the only known son of Swantibor I, a Pomeranian prince about whom very little is known.

In the early 1170s, a Danish army under King Valdemar I besieged Szczecin Castle. Reportedly, Wartislaw II surrendered and handed the castle to the Danes. In 1173, he founded Kołbacz Abbey.

After the death of Duke Bogislaw I in 1187, Wartislaw II and Boglislaw's widow Anastasia jointly acted as guardians and regents for the underage Dukes Bogislaw II and Casimir II. The fact that he was their guardian is considered a strong indication that he was closely related to them; the exact family relationship is unknown. Wartislaw II was charged with convincing King Canute VI of Denmark to enfeoffed the young Dukes with Pomerania. However, a revolt against Denmark broke out during his rule, and in 1189, Canute VI deposed him and appointed Prince Jaromar I of Rügen as regent. Wartislaw II then retired from public life.

Nothing is known about his later life, except the archives of Kołbacz mention that he died in 1196.

== Issue ==
His known sons:

- Bartholomew of Szczecin (d. c. 1220), probably Castellan of Szczecin
- Casimir (d. 1220), Castellan of Kołobrzeg
- Wartislaw (↑ 1230/32), Castellan of Stettin

It is disputed whether Bishop Conrad II of Cammin (d. 1233) was a son of Wartislaw.
