= Duchy of Pomerania =

Vassal state in west-central Europe from 1121 to 1637

Duchy of Pomerania Herzogtum Pommern (German) Księstwo pomorskie (Polish) Pòmòrsczé Ksãstwò (Kashubian)
- 1121–1160; 1264–1295; 1478–1531; 1625–1637
- Coat of arms

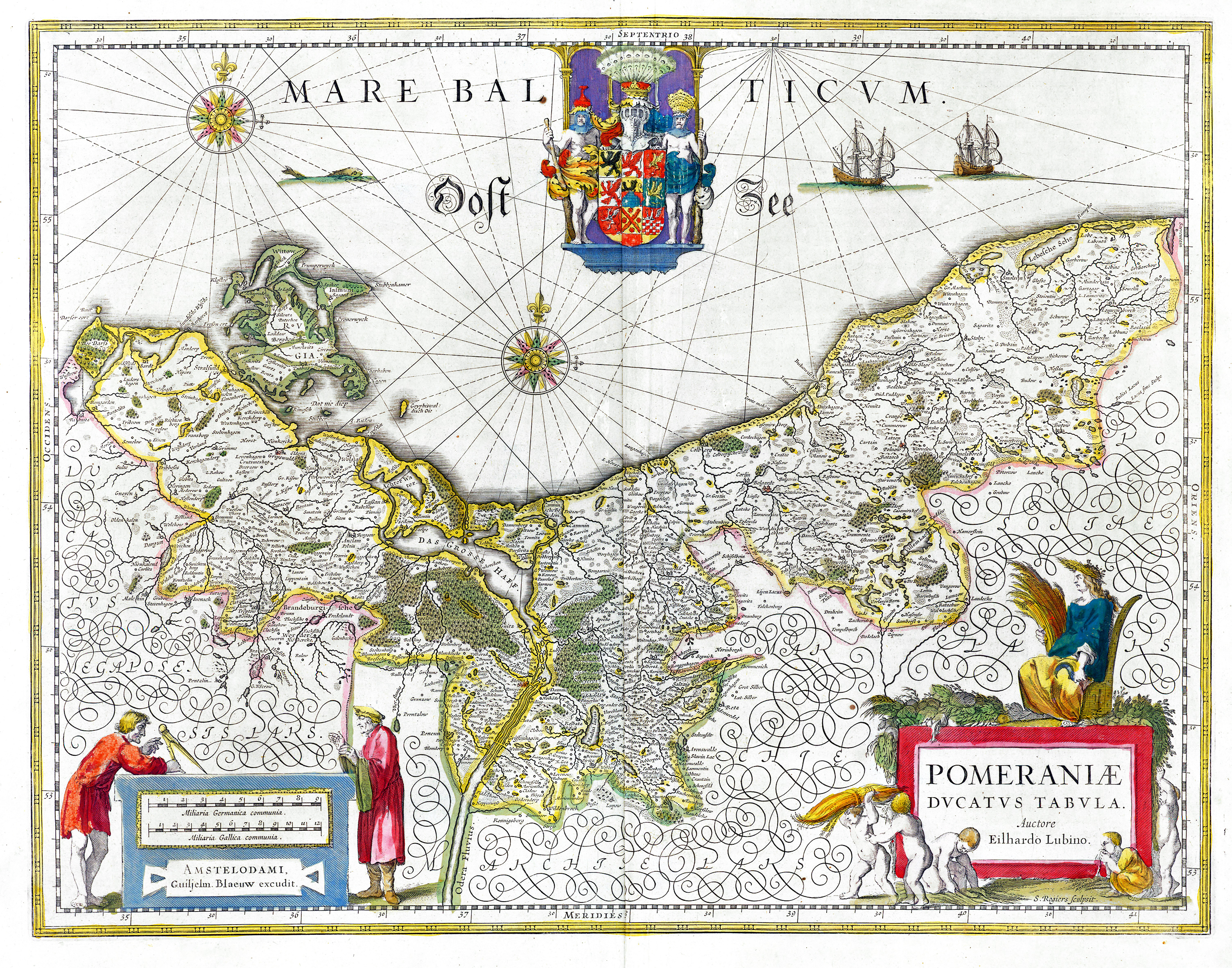
- Map of the Duchy of Pomerania from the 17th century
- Status: Vassal of Poland (1121–1138); Independent (1138–1160); Vassal of Saxony (1164–1181); Vassal of the Holy Roman Empire (1181–1185); Vassal of Denmark (1185–1227); Vassal of the Holy Roman Empire (1227–1637)
- Capital: Stettin (Szczecin)
- Religion: Roman Catholic; Lutheran
- Government: Feudal duchy
- Historical era: High Middle Ages
  - Wartislaw I, Duke of Pomerania: 1121
  - Partition into Wolgast and Stettin: 1295
  - Reunited under Bogislaw X: 1478
  - Joined Upper Saxon Circle: 1512
  - Divided again into P.-Wolgast and P.-Stettin: 1532
  - Occupied by Gustavus Adolphus of Sweden: 1630
  - Death of Duke Bogislaw XIV: 10 March 1637
Preceded by
Duchy of Poland
Pomerania-Demmin
Pomerania-Stettin
Pomerania-Wolgast
Pomerania-Stolp
Pomerania-Stargard
Pomerania-Barth
Pomerania-Wolgast-Stolp
Pomerania-Rügenwalde
Succeeded by
Pomerania-Demmin
Pomerania-Stettin
Pomerania-Wolgast
Pomerania-Wolgast-Stolp
Margraviate of Brandenburg
Swedish Pomerania
- Today part of: Poland; Germany

The Duchy of Pomerania (German: Herzogtum Pommern; Polish: Księstwo pomorskie, Kashubian: Pòmòrsczé Ksãstwò; Latin: Ducatus Pomeraniae) was a duchy in Pomerania on the southern coast of the Baltic Sea, ruled by dukes of the House of Pomerania (Griffins). The country existed as a united duchy between years 1121–1160, 1264–1295, 1478–1531, and 1625–1637.

The duchy originated from the realm of Wartislaw I, a Slavic Pomeranian duke, and was extended by the Lands of Schlawe and Stolp in 1317, the Principality of Rügen in 1325, and the Lauenburg and Bütow Land in 1455. During the High Middle Ages, it also comprised the northern Neumark and Uckermark areas as well as Circipania and Mecklenburg-Strelitz.

The Duchy of Pomerania was established as a vassal state of Poland in 1121, which it remained until the fragmentation of Poland after the death of Polish ruler Bolesław III Wrymouth in 1138. Afterwards the Dukes of Pomerania were independent, and later were vassals of the Duchy of Saxony from 1164 to 1181, of the Holy Roman Empire from 1181 to 1185, of Denmark from 1185 to 1227 and finally, from 1227 on, staying with the Holy Roman Empire (including periods of vassalage to the Margraves of Brandenburg).

Most of the time, the duchy was ruled by several Griffin dukes in common, resulting in various internal partitions. After the last Griffin duke had died during the Thirty Years' War in 1637, the duchy was partitioned between Brandenburg-Prussia and Sweden. The Kings of Sweden and the Margraves of Brandenburg, later Kings of Prussia, became members as Dukes of Pomerania in the Imperial Diet.

The name Pomerania (po more) is of Slavic origin and means “land by the sea”.

== History ==
In the 12th century, Poland, the Holy Roman Empire's Duchy of Saxony and Denmark variously conquered Pomerania, ending the tribal era.

=== House of Pomerania (Griffins) ===
The Pomeranian Griffin

The Słupsk and Sławno areas were ruled by Ratibor I and his descendants (Ratiboriden branch of the Griffin House of Pomerania) until the Danish occupation and extinction of the Ratiboride branch in 1227.

The areas stretching from Kołobrzeg to Szczecin were ruled by Ratibor's brother Wartislaw I and his descendants (House of Pomerania, also called Griffins, of which he was the first ascertained ancestor) until the 1630s. The terms of surrender after the Polish conquest were that Wartislaw had to accept Polish sovereignty, convert his people to Christianity, and pay an annual tribute to the Polish duke.

=== Poland ===
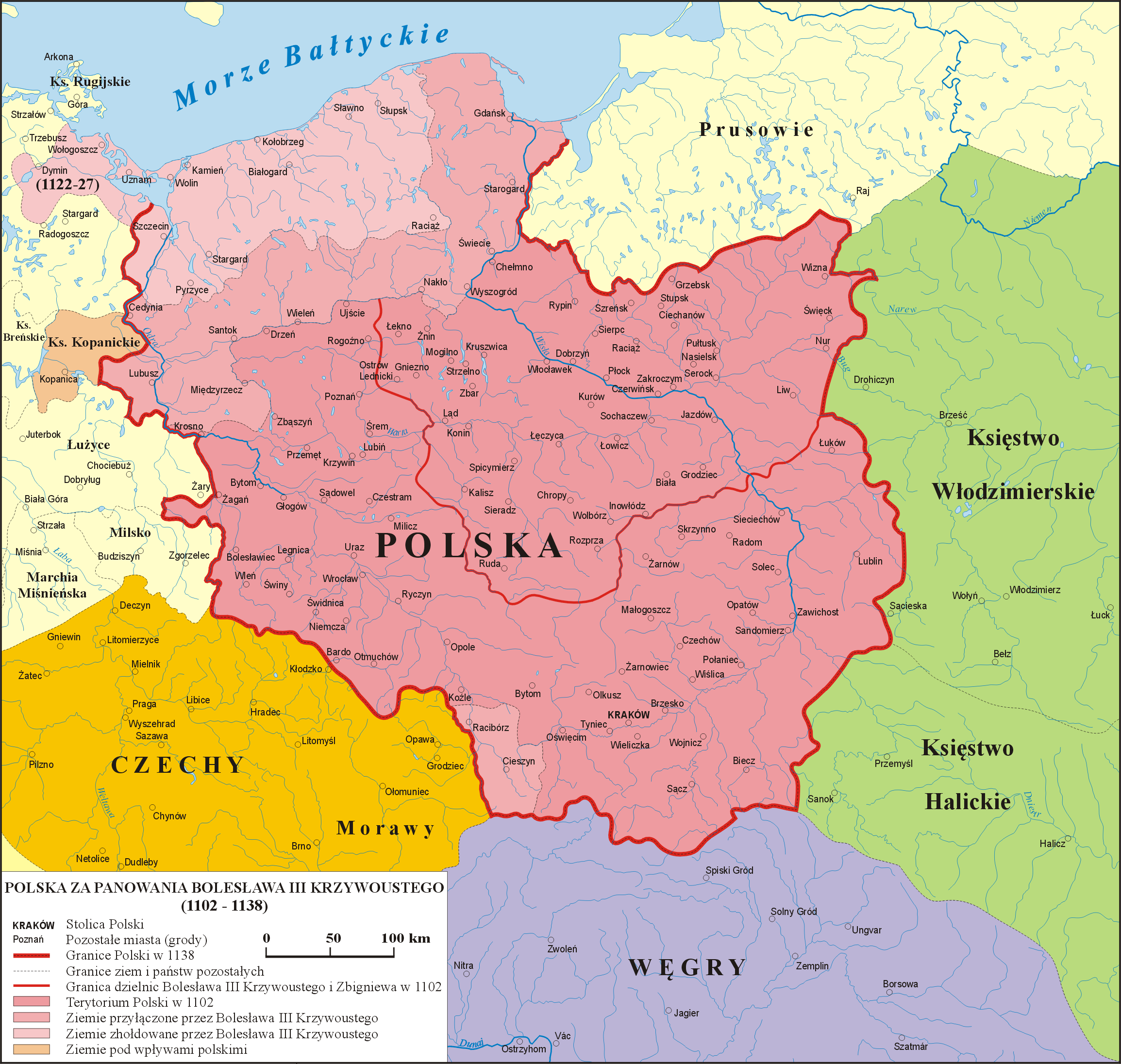
Poland with Pomerania during the rule of Bolesław III Wrymouth

In several expeditions mounted between 1102 and 1121, most of Pomerania had been conquered by the Polish duke Bolesław III Wrymouth.

From 1102 to 1109, Boleslaw campaigned in the Noteć and Parsęta area. The Pomeranian residence in Białogard was taken already in 1102. From 1112 to 1116, Boleslaw subdued all of Pomerelia. From 1119 to 1122, the area towards the Oder were subdued. Szczecin was taken in the winter of 1121–1122.

The conquest resulted in a high death toll and devastation of vast areas of Pomerania, and the Pomeranian dukes were forced to become vassals of Boleslaw III, King of Poland.

Poland's influence vanished in the next decade. In 1135, Bolesław had accepted overlordship of Holy Roman Emperor Lothair III and in turn received his Pomeranian gains as well as the still undefeated Principality of Rügen as a fief. Wartislaw I also accepted the Emperor as his overlord. With Bolesław's death in 1138 and the fragmentation of Poland, Polish overlordship ended, triggering competition of the Holy Roman Empire and Denmark for the area.

=== Westward expansion of Wartislaw I ===
In the meantime, Wartislaw managed to conquer vast territories west of the Oder river, an area inhabited by Lutici tribes weakened by past warfare, and included these territories into his Duchy of Pomerania. Already in 1120, he had expanded west into the areas near the Oder Lagoon and Peene river. Most notably Demmin, the Principality of Gützkow and Wolgast were conquered in the following years.

The major stage of the westward expansion into Lutici territory occurred between Otto of Bamberg's two missions, 1124 and 1128. In 1128, Demmin, the County of Gützkow and Wolgast were already incorporated into Wartislaw I's realm, yet warfare was still going on. Captured Lutici and other war loot, including livestock, money, and clothes were apportioned among the victorious. After Wartislaw's Lutician conquests, his duchy lay between the Bay of Greifswald to the north, Circipania, including Güstrow (Ostrów), to the west, Kolobrzeg in the east, and possibly as far as the Havel and Spree rivers in the south.

These gains were not subject to Polish over lordship, but were placed under over lordship of Nordmark margrave Albrecht the Bear, who, according to Polish sources, was a dedicated enemy of Slavs, by Lothair III, Holy Roman Emperor. Thus, the western territories contributed to making Wartislaw significantly independent from the Polish dukes. Wartislaw was not the only one campaigning in these areas. The Polish Duke Boleslaw III, during his Pomeranian campaign launched an expedition into the Müritz area in 1120–21, before he turned back to subdue Wartislaw. The later Holy Roman Emperor Lothair III (then Saxon duke Lothair I of Supplinburg) in 1114 initiated massive campaigns against the local Lutici tribes resulting in their final defeat in 1228. Also, the territories were invaded by Danish forces multiple times, who, coming from the Baltic Sea, used the rivers Peene and Uecker to advance to a line Demmin–Pasewalk. At different times, Pomeranians, Saxons and Danes were either allies or opponents. The Pomeranian dukes consolidated their power in the course of the 12th century, yet the preceding warfare had left these territories completely devastated.

=== Conversion and the Pomeranian diocese ===
Coat of arms of the Kammin diocese

A first attempt to convert the Pomeranians was made following the subjugation of Pomerania by Boleslaw III of Poland. In 1122, Spanish monk Bernard (also Bernhard) travelled to Jumne (Wolin), accompanied only by his chaplain and an interpreter. The Pomeranians however were not impressed by his missionary efforts and finally threw him out of town.

Bernard was later made the first bishop of Lubusz in Poland.

After Bernard's misfortune, Boleslaw III asked Otto of Bamberg to convert Pomerania to Christianity, which he accomplished in his first visit in 1124–25. Otto's strategy severely differed from the one Bernard used: While Bernard travelled alone and as a poor and unknown priest, Otto, a wealthy and famous man, was accompanied by 20 clergy of his own diocese, numerous servants, 60 warriors supplied to him by Boleslaw, and carried with him numerous supplies and gifts. After arriving in Pyrzyce, the Pomeranians were assured that Otto's aim was not the gain of wealth at the expense of the Pomeranian people, as he was wealthy already, but only to convert them to Christianity, which would protect the Pomeranians from further punishment by God, as which the devastating Polish conquest was depicted. This approach turned out to be successful, and was backed by parts of the Pomeranian nobility that in part was Christian raised already, like duke Wartislaw I, who encouraged and promoted Otto's mission. Many Pomeranians were baptized already in Pyrzyce and also in the other burghs visited.

Otto of Bamberg returned in 1128, this time invited by duke Wartislaw I himself, aided by the emperor Holy Roman Emperor Lothar II, to convert the (Lutician) Slavs of Western Pomerania just incorporated into the Pomeranian duchy, and to strengthen the Christian faith of the inhabitants of Stettin and Wollin, who fell back into heathen practices and idolatry. Otto this time visited primarily Western Pomeranian burghs, had the temples of Gützkow and Wolgast torn down and on their sites erected the predecessors of today's St Nikolai and St Petri churches, respectively. The nobility assembled to a congress in Usedom, where they accepted Christianity on 10 June 1128. Otto then was titled apostolus gentis Pomeranorum, made a saint by pope Clement III in 1189, and was worshipped in Pomerania even after the Protestant Reformation.

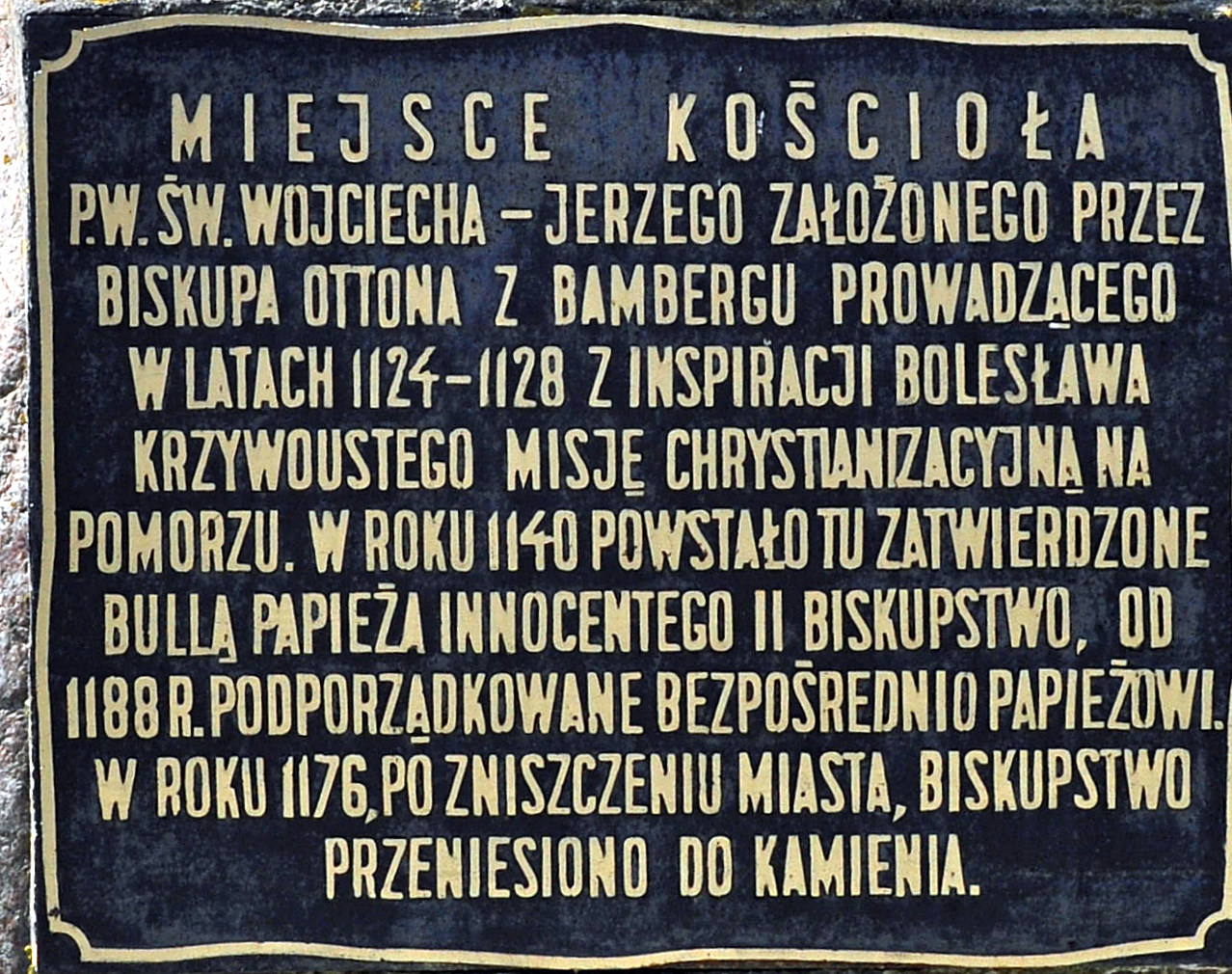
Plaque at the site of the first cathedral in Wolin

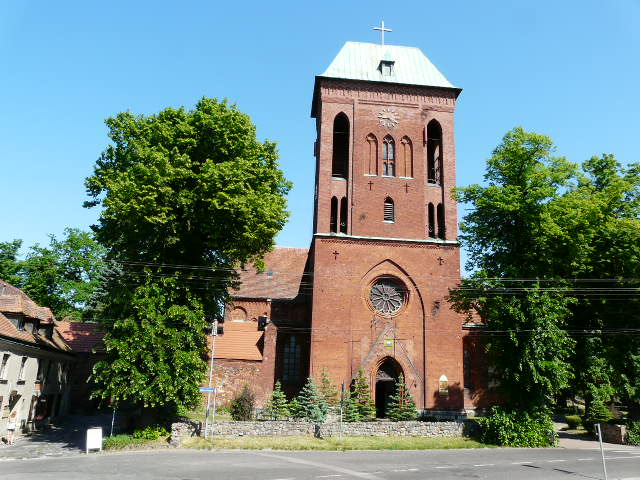
Former Cathedral, now Co-Cathedral in Kamień Pomorski

In 1140, one year after Otto of Bamberg's death, a Pomeranian diocese was founded and placed directly under the Holy See. Adalbert of Pomerania, who had participated in Otto's mission as an interpreter and assistant, was made the first bishop. The direct subordination under the pope thwarted the claims of the archbishops of Magdeburg and Gniezno, who both had asserted pressure on Otto of Bamberg to incorporate the new diocese into their realms. The initial see of the Pomeranian diocese was Wolin, and was moved to Grobe Abbey on the island of Usedom and to Kammin (Cammin, now Kamien Pomorski) after 1150 and 1175, respectively. Since 1188, when the pope accepted the move of the see, the bishopric was referred to as Roman Catholic Diocese of Kammin, while before it was addressed as Pomeranian diocese.

In 1248, the Kammin bishops and the Pomeranian dukes had interchanged the terrae Stargard and Kolberg, leaving the bishops in charge of the latter. In the following, the bishops extended their secular reign, which soon comprised the Kolberg (now Kołobrzeg), Köslin (also Cöslin, now Koszalin) and Bublitz (now Bobolice) areas. When in 1276 they became the sovereign of the town of Kolberg also, they moved their residence there, while the administration of the diocese was done from nearby Köslin. The bishops at multiple occasions tried to exclude their secular reign from ducal overlordship by applying for Imperial immediacy (Reichsunmittelbarkeit). The Pomeranian dukes successfully forestalled these ambitions, and immediacy was granted only temporarily in 1345.

=== Denmark and the Holy Roman Empire ===
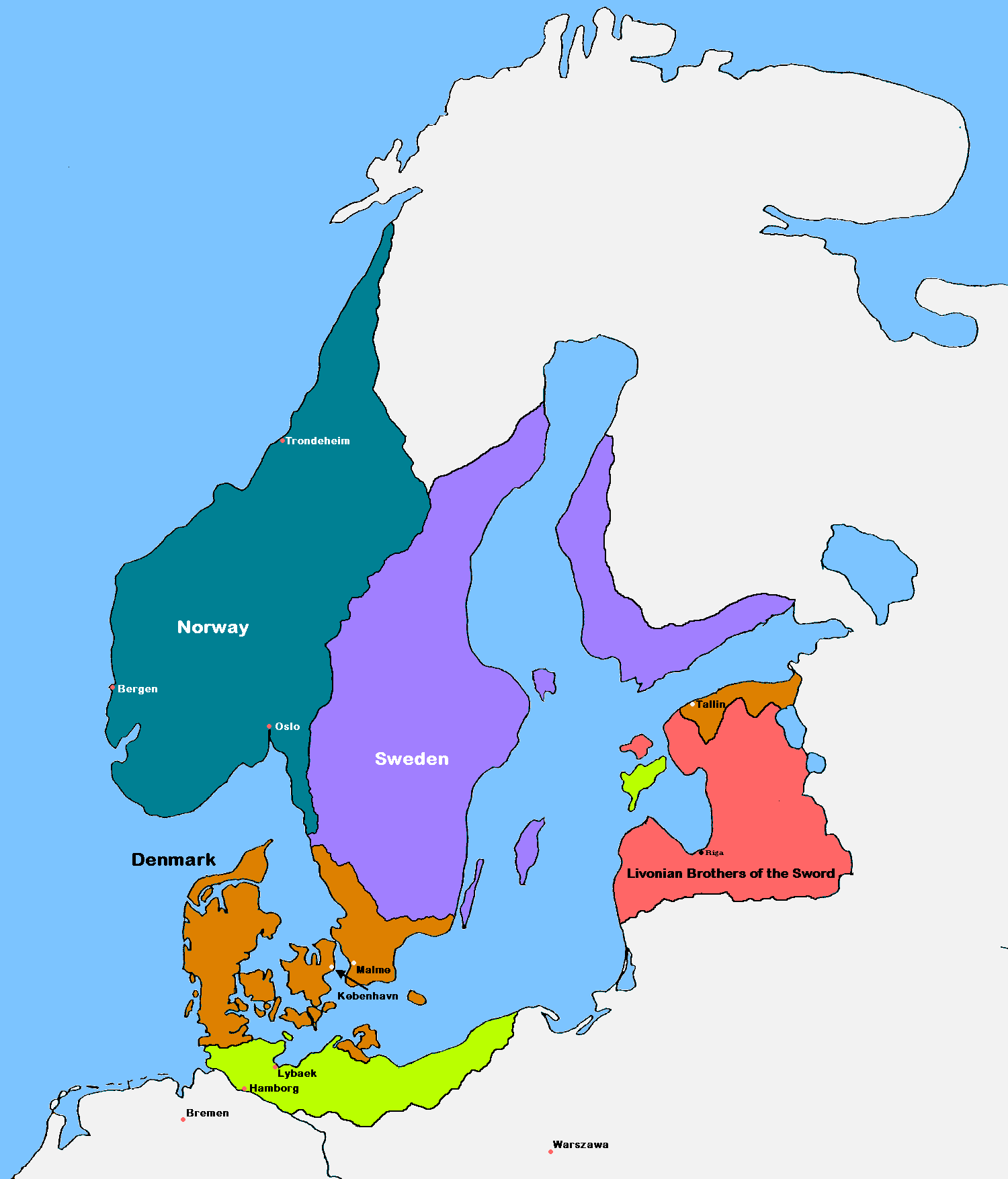
Northern countries in 1219 Norway Sweden Denmark Conquered by Denmark in 1219 (Pomerania conquered in 1219, lost in 1227. Ösel purchased in 1559, lost in 1645) Livonia before 1343

In the West, bishops and dukes of the Holy Roman Empire mounted expeditions to Pomerania. Most notable for the further fate of Pomerania are the 1147 Wendish Crusade and the 1164 Battle of Verchen, the Pomeranian dukes became vassals of Henry the Lion, of Saxony. Despite this vassalage, Henry again sieged Demmin in 1177 when he allied with the Danes, but reconciled with the Pomeranian dukes thereafter. In 1181 the dukes took their duchy as a fief from the Holy Roman Emperor Barbarossa. Bogislaw I, Duke of Pomerania had travelled to Barbarossa's camp in Lübeck, where he received the Imperial flag and the title "Duke of Slavinia".

From the North, Denmark attacked Pomerania. Several campaigns throughout the 12th century (in 1136, 1150, 1159 and throughout the 1160s) culminated in the defeat of the Principality of Rugia in 1168. The Rugian princes became vassals of Valdemar I of Denmark. In the fall of 1170, the Danes raided the Oder estuary. In 1171, the Danes raided Circipania and took Cotimar's burgh in Behren-Lübchin. In 1173, the Danes turned to the Oder Lagoon again, taking the burgh of Szczecin. Wartislaw II Swantiboriz, castellan of Stettin, became a Danish vassal. In 1177, the Danes again raided the Oder Lagoon area, also the burgh of Wolgast in 1178. In 1184 and 1185, three campaigns of the Danes resulted in making Bogislaw I, Duke of Pomerania a Danish vassal. These campaigns were mounted by Valdemar's son and successor for the Danish throne, Canute VI of Denmark. In the Duchy of Pomerania the Danish period lasted until Valdemar II of Denmark lost the Battle of Bornhöved on 22 July 1227. Danish supremacy prevailed until 1325 in the Rugian principality.

At that time, the duchy was also referred to as Slavinia (German: Slawien), a term also applied to several Wendish areas such as Mecklenburg and the Principality of Rügen.

== German settlement (Ostsiedlung) ==
Starting in the 12th century, Pomerania was settled with Germans in a process termed Ostsiedlung, that affected all medieval East Central and Eastern Europe. Except for the Pomerelian Kashubians and the Slovincians, the Wends were assimilated. Most towns and villages date back to this period.

=== Rural settlement ===
Before the Ostsiedlung, Pomerania was rather sparsely settled. Around 1200, a relatively dense population could be found on the islands of Rügen, Usedom and Wolin, around the burghs of Szczecin, Koszalin, Pyrzyce and Stargard, around the Parsęta river (Kołobrzeg area), the lower Peene river, and between Sławno and the Leba valley. Largely unsettled were the hilly regions and the woods in the South. The 12th century warfare, especially the Danish raids, depopulated many areas of Pomerania and caused severe population drops in others (e.g. Usedom). At the turn to the 13th century, only isolated German settlements existed, e.g. Hohenkrug (Struga) and other German villages, and the merchant's settlement near the Szczecin burgh. In contrast, the monasteries were almost exclusively run by Germans and Danes.

Massive German settlement started in the first half of the 13th century. Ostsiedlung was a common process at this time in all Central Europe and was largely run by the nobles and monasteries to increase their income. Also, the settlers were expected to finish and secure the conversion of the non-nobles to Christianity. In addition, the Danes withdrew from most of Pomerania in 1227, leaving the duchy vulnerable to their expansive neighbors, especially Mecklenburg, Brandenburg, and Henry I of Silesia.

Germans, at this early stage (before 1240), were often settled in frontier regions, such as the mainland part of the Principality of Rugia (after prince Jaromar I granted Eldena Abbey the right to call in settlers in 1209), Circipania, the lands of Loitz (administered semi-independently by Detlev of Gadebush), the Uckermark, the lands of Kołbacz Abbey and Bahn (Banie) (which later was granted to the Knights Templar), and the area north of the Warta and along the lower Oder river. However, in many of these frontiers, German settlement did not hinder the advance of Pomerania's neighbors.

Germans were placed under a different law than Slavs. While those were unfree (except for the nobles), did not own the soil they cultivated, and were to serve the nobility, the opposite was true for the Germans.

About 1240, the areas of Stavenhagen and Pyrzyce (Pyritz) were subject to German settlement. About 1250, massive settlement took place also in Central Western Pomerania (County of Gützkow, lands of Meseritz, Ploth, Ziethen and Groswin), and the Stargard area (where settlement was encouraged already since 1229). In the 1260s, settlement started in the Kamień (Cammin) area, and in the virtually unpopulated lands of Nowogard (Naugard), Massow and Dobra (Daber). The Ueckermünde and the Oder mouth areas were also settled at about 1260, but the Ueckermünde heath and the woodlands on both sides of the Oder Lagoon remained untouched. In the areas adjacent to the Peenestrom (the lands of Wusterhusen and Lassan) local Slavs participated in the German settlement, which started in the 1260s. Settlement of the areas centered on the upper Rega river, previously unsettled, started in the 1250s, and reached a peak in the 1280s. The lower Rega area around Greifenberg in Pommern (Gryfice) and Treptow an der Rega (Trzebiatów) was settled about the same period, but here a native Slavic population participated. In the Persante (Parsęta) area, first German settlements occurred about 1260, but a more extensive settlement did not start before 1280. On the islands of Usedom and Wolin, only isolated settlements took place in the 13th century, e.g. in the Garz (Usedom) and Caseburg (Karsibór) area, where Germans settled already in the 1240s, and in proximity of the German town of Wolin. The local Grobe Abbey did, in contrast to the other Pomeranian monasteries, not enhance German settlement. Therefore, Slavic culture on the isles persisted and vanished only in the late 14th century. The island of Rügen, in contrast to the meanwhile German mainland parts of the principality, also remained a Slavic character throughout the 13th century – German settlement would only start in the 14th century, with strong participation of local Slavs. In Sławno and Słupsk (Schlawe and Stolp), German settlement started in the 1260s, and was promoted by the Belbuck Abbey. A large influx of settlers to the western parts of Schlawe-Stolp took place after 1270, first settlers were called to the Stolp area in the 1280s. Here, local Slavs participated in the Ostsiedlung, and settlement went on throughout the 14th century.

Initially, the Germans who settled the northern regions predominantly came from Lower Saxony, while the Germans who settled the southern areas (mittelpommerscher Keil) predominantly came from Altmark and Westphalia. This caused the emergence of East Pomeranian, Central Pomeranian and Mecklenburgisch-Vorpommersch dialects. German settlers also came from areas earlier affected from Ostsiedlung, such as Mecklenburg, Brandenburg, and later also German settled regions of Pomerania herself. Though the exact proportion of German versus Slavic populations cannot be determined, it is undisputed that the Germans significantly outnumbered the Slavs. Before the end of the 13th century, the Western Pomeranian mainland and most of Farther Pomerania west of the Gollenberg had turned almost completely German, mentions of Slavs in documents became exceptional. The Slavic dialects disappeared, with the exception that fishermen from the isles and the Oder lagoon area continued to use Wendish for a relatively long period.

Villages before the Ostsiedlung were of the Haufendorf type, the houses were built in close proximity to each other without a special ruling. A variant of this type also found in Pomerania is the Sackgassendorf (or Sackdorf) type, where a dead end road leads to those houses. This type evolved as an extension of Haufendorf type villages. German settlement introduced new types of villages: In the Hagenhufendorf type, houses were built on both sides of a main road, each within their own hide (German: Hagen). Those villages were usually set up after the clearance of woodlands, most of them were given German names in absence of any Slavic site names. This type of village can be found all along the coast, most of them in the areas between Barth and Wolgast, Kolberg (Kołobrzeg) and Köslin (Koszalin), and north and west of Schlawe (Sławno). Other villages were built in the Angerdorf type, where a main street fork encloses a large meadow ("Anger") in the village's center where the life stock was kept at night, sometimes the church or other buildings not used for living were built on the Anger also. This type is the most prominent type in the Peene, lower Oder, Pyrzyce, Lake Madü and Rega areas, many villages of this type are also found in the Kolberg and Schlawe area. In addition to these types, the Straßendorf type, characterized by a single and very long main street, was introduced in a later stage of Ostsiedlung, and therefore is found predominantly in areas that were affected last by the German settlement (easternmost parts, Cammin area). Villages of this type were either new foundations, or extensions of Slavic precursors. In other areas, Hagenhufendorf and Angerdorf types dominate, while the Haufendorf type used in Slavic times and its Sackdorf variant can still be found in between, predominantly on the islands.

The villages' area was divided in hides. The size of a hide differed between the village types: A Hagenhufe, used in the Hagenhufendorf villages, comprised 60 Morgen (Latin: iugera), about 40 hectares. A Landhufe, used in the Angerdorf villages, comprised 30 Morgen. One farm would usually have an area of one Hagenhufe or two Landhufen. Slavic farmland was measured in Haken (Latin: uncus), with one Haken equals 15 Morgen (half a Landhufe). Haken were used only in villages remaining under old Slavic law (predominantly on the islands), whereas Hufen were used for new villages placed under German law (in Pomerania sometimes referred to as Schwerin Law). Not all families of German villages owned a Hufe. Those dwelling on considerably smaller property ("gardens") were usually hired as workers by the farmers (German: Vollbauern). These people were termed "gardeners" (German: Gärtner) or Kossäten (literally "who sits in a hut"), and could either be local Slavs or the younger sons of German farmers who did not inherit their father's soil.

=== Foundation of towns ===
Nearly all towns in modern Pomerania date back to the Ostsiedlung. In Slavic times, there have been town-like settlements already in Demmin, Wolgast, Usedom, Wolin, Szczecin, Kołobrzeg, Pyrzyce and Stargard, although many of the coastal settlements declined during the 12th century warfare. Yet these settlements were not continued by the German towns, which were founded on previously unsettled soil. Although some towns had a Slavic settlement, sometimes attached to a burgh, as precursor, the name of which would be adopted for the German town, the new town was usually founded on empty space in the settlements neighborhood. The distance could be some kilometers as in the case of Kolberg. Exceptions are Wollin and probably Cammin, which were built on the spot of former, yet decayed settlements, and Stettin, where two German settlements were set up close to the Slavic burgh and settlement, all of which were included in the later town. In many cases, the name of the neighboring Slavic settlement would be used for the new town.

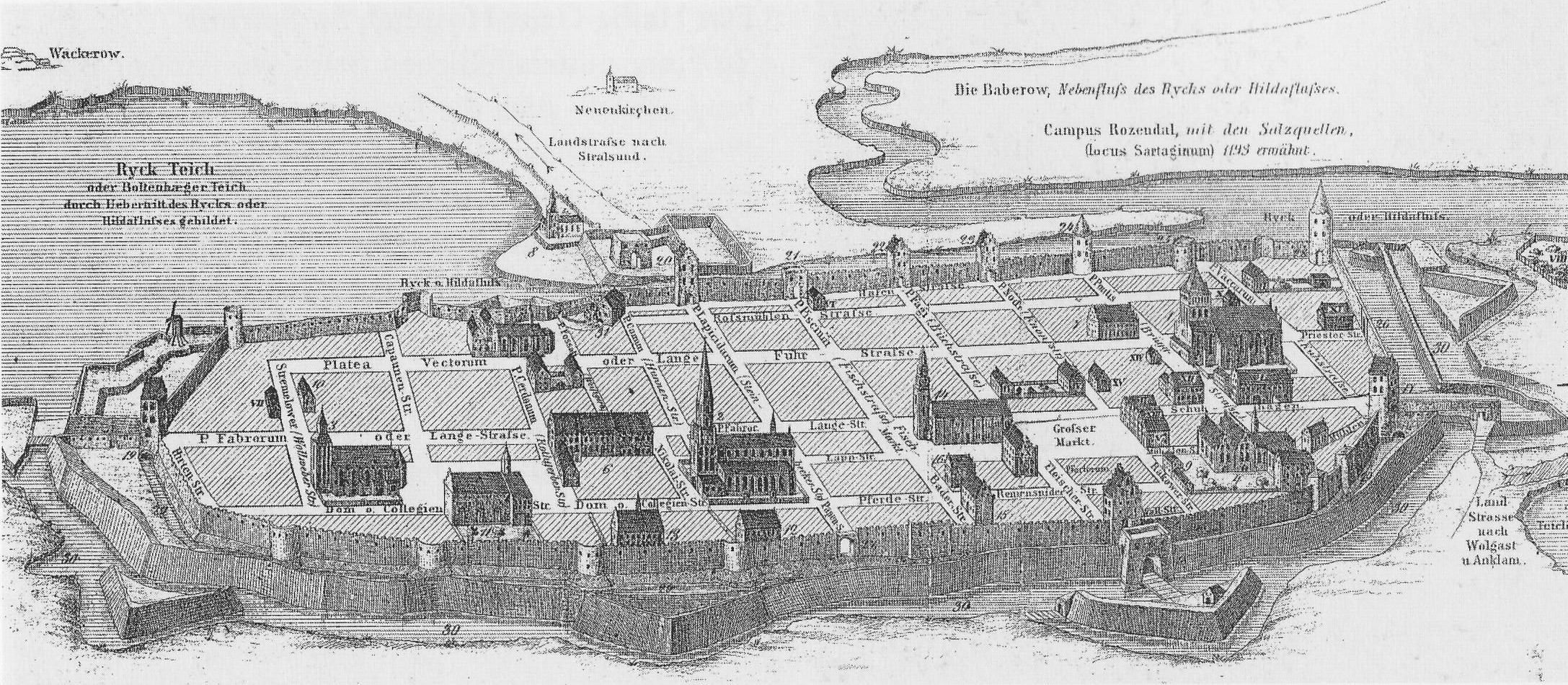
Medieval Greifswald, a typical Ostsiedlung town. Locators set up rectangular blocs in an area resembling an oval with a central market, and organized the settlement.

The towns were built on behalf of the Pomeranian dukes or ecclesial bodies like monasteries and orders. Most prominent on this issue was Barnim I of Pomerania-Stettin (Szczecin), who since was entitled "the towns' founder". The towns build on his behalf were granted Magdeburg Law and settled predominantly by people from the western Margraviate of Brandenburg, while the towns founded in the North (most on behalf of the Rugian princes and Wartislaw III of Pomerania-Demmin were granted Lübeck Law and were settled predominantly by people from Lower Saxony. The first towns were Stralsund (Principality of Rügen, 1234), Prenzlau (Uckermark, then Pomerania-Stettin, 1234), Bahn (Knights Templar, about 1234), and Stettin (1237–43), Gartz (Oder) (Pomerania-Stettin, 1240), and Loitz (by Detlev of Gadebusch, 1242). Other towns built in the 1240s were Demmin, Greifswald (by Eldena Abbey), Altentreptow.

In the 1250s followed Anklam, Altdamm (Dąbie), Pyritz (Pyrzyce), probably already Stargard and Grimmen, Greifenhagen, Barth (Principality of Rügen, before 1255), and Damgarten (Principality of Rügen, 1258). In the 1260s followed Wollin (1260), Ueckermünde, Wolgast, probably already Gützkow, Pölitz (1260), Greifenberg (1262), Gollnow, probably already Usedom, Penkun, Tribsees (Principality of Rügen, before 1267) and Naugard (by the bishop of Cammin, before 1268). In the 1270s followed Cammin (1274), Massow (by the bishop of Cammin, 1274), Pasewalk (recorded in 1274, founded probably in the 1250s), Plathe (1277), Lassan (between 1264 and 1278), Rügenwalde (by Vitslav II of Rügen), Regenwalde (1279–80), Labes (about 1280), and Treptow an der Rega (between 1277 and 1281). Neuwarp, Richtenberg, Belgard, and Werben (by the bishop of Cammin) are first recorded in 1295, 1297, 1299, and 1300, respectively, all were most certainly founded earlier.

In the area directly administered by the bishops of Cammin, the towns of Kolberg (1255), Köslin (1266), Körlin (early 14th century), and Bublitz (1340) were set up. The early 14th century saw the foundation of Stolp (by Waldemar of Brandenburg, 1310), Neustettin (by Wartislaw IV, 1310), Rügenwalde (again 1312, the 1270s precursor had not done well), Rugendal (Principality of Rügen, before 1313, decayed), Schlawe (by the Swenzones, 1317), Garz (by the princes of Rügen, 1320s), Jacobshagen (by three brothers von Stegelitz, 1336), Freienwalde (by von Wedel, before 1338), Zanow (by the Swenzones, 1343), Lauenburg (by the Teutonic Knights, 1341), Bütow (by the Teutonic Knights, 1346), and Fiddichow (by Barnim III, 1347).

Many towns with a burgh in close proximity had the duke level this burgh when they grew in power. Stettin, where the burgh was inside the town, had the duke level his burgh already in 1249, other towns were to follow. The fortified new towns had succeeded the burghs as strongholds for the country's defense. In many cases, the former burgh settlement would become a Slavic suburb of the German town ("Wiek", "Wieck"). In Stettin, two "Wiek" suburbs were set up anew outside the walls, to which most Slavs from within the walls were resettled. Such Wiek settlements did initially not belong to the town, but to the duke, although they were likely to come into possession of the town in the course of the 14th century. Also in the 14th century, Slavic Wiek suburbs lost their Slavic character.

Indigenous Slavs faced discrimination from the arriving Germans, who on a local level since the 16th century imposed discriminatory regulations, such as bans on buying goods from Slavs or prohibiting them from becoming members of craft guilds.

=== Hanseatic towns ===
The towns of Pomerania that had joined the Hanseatic League acted independently from the duchy, and sometimes opposed the dukes' interest. The most powerful towns were Stralsund, Greifswald, and Stettin (Szczecin), but also Demmin, Anklam and Kolberg (Kołobrzeg). Before the Treaty of Stralsund in 1370, and during the reign of Eric of Pomerania, the Hanseatic towns were in a state of war with Denmark for hegemony in the Baltic Sea.

Parts of the Pomeranian nobility were engaged in piracy against Hanseatic vessels. Barnim VI of Pomerania-Wolgast did not only engage in piracy himself, he is also known for providing refuge and hideouts for the Likedeeler pirate organisation.

The relation between the towns and the nobility throughout the Middle Ages ranged from alliances and support (German: Landfrieden) to cabalism, banditry and outright warfare.

== Pomerania-Demmin and Pomerania-Stettin (1155–1264) ==
In 1155, the duchy was partitioned in Pomerania-Demmin and Pomerania-Stettin (Szczecin). With short interruptions, this division lasted until 1264.

Wartislaw I was murdered between 1134 and 1148 in Stolpe. His brother, Ratibor I of Schlawe-Stolp, founded Stolpe Abbey near this site and ruled Wartislaw's realm in place of his minor nephews, Bogislaw I and Casimir I. Ratibor died in 1155, and Wartislaw's sons agreed to co-rule the duchy from their residences Demmin (Casimir) and Stettin (Bogislaw). Except for the terra Kołobrzeg, which was ruled as a co-dominion, they partitioned the duchy with Pomerania-Demmin comprising the upper Peene, Tollense, Dievenow (Dziwnów) and Rega areas, and Pomerania-Stettin comprising the Oder, Ina and lower Peene areas. When Casimir I died in 1180, Bogislaw became the sole duke. Bogislaw I took his duchy as a fief from the Holy Roman Emperor Frederick I (Barbarossa) in 1181, and from the Danish king Canute VI in 1185.

When he died in 1187, his two sons Casimir II and Bogislaw II were still minors, and Stettin castellan Wartislaw (II) ruled in their place. Danish pressure resulted in Wartislaw's replacement by Rugian prince Jaromar I, a Danish vassal, in 1189. The Principality of Rügen was extended southward on the expense of Pomerania-Demmin. When Casimir II and Bogislaw II died in 1219 and 1220, respectively, their respective sons Wartislaw III (Pomerania-Demmin) and Barnim I (Pomerania-Stettin) were still minors. Wartislaw's mother Ingardis of Denmark thus ruled until Wartislaw was able to rule Pomerania-Demmin on his own in 1225, and Barnim, in theory duke since 1220, practically started his reign in Pomerania-Stettin only in 1233. Pomerania-Demmin lost her southern and western areas to Brandenburg, and the remainder came under Barnim's rule after Wartislaw died in 1264.

== Territorial changes in the 13th century ==
=== War with Brandenburg ===
During the reign of Otto I, Margrave of Brandenburg and son of Albert I of Brandenburg (1100–1170), Brandenburg claimed sovereignty over Pomerania. Yet, in 1181, Holy Roman Emperor Frederick I invested Duke Bogislaw I of the Griffin House of Pomerania with the Duchy of Slavia (Pomerania). This was not accepted by the Margraviate of Brandenburg and triggered several military conflicts.

Between 1185 and 1227, Pomerania along with most of the southern Baltic coast remained under sovereignty of Denmark. However, Brandenburg again tried to gain sovereignty over Pomerania, and in 1214 for a short time conquered Stettin (Szczecin). After Denmark lost the Battle of Bornhöved in 1227, Denmark lost all her territories on the southern Baltic shore, including Pomerania.

At this time, the Duchy of Pomerania was co-ruled by duke Wartislaw III of Demmin and duke Barnim I of Stettin (Szczecin). After the Danes retreated, Brandenburg took her chance and invaded Pomerania-Demmin. In 1231, Holy Roman Emperor Frederick II gave the duchy, which then was again a part of the empire, as a fief to the Ascanian margraves of Brandenburg.

Denmark also attempted to restore her rule and took Wolgast and Demmin in 1235, but was driven out the same year. Wartislaw had to accept Brandenburg's overlordship in the 1236 Treaty of Kremmen, furthermore he had to hand over most of his duchy to Brandenburg immediately, that was the Burg Stargard Land and adjacent areas (all soon to become a part of Mecklenburg, forming the bulk of the later Mecklenburg-Strelitz area). Circipania was already lost to Mecklenburg in the years before.

In the 1250 Treaty of Landin between Pomeranian dukes and margraves of Brandenburg, Barnim I managed to reassert the rule of his Griffin house over Pomerania, but lost the Uckermark to Brandenburg.

Brandenburg since 1250 expanded eastward. In 1250–52, the margraves gained half of Lubusz Land, including the terra Küstrin (Kostrzyn) between Warta and Mietzel (Myśla), and the terra Chinz north of the Mietzel river, both previously held by Barnim. In the course of the 1250s, the margraves further gained the castellanies Santok and Drezdenko except for the burghs itself, of both castellanies actually belonging to Greater Poland, Barnim had held the northern parts. In 1261, Barnim lost the Soldin (Myślibórz) area, and in the following years the terra Zehden (Cedynia) to Brandenburg.

In 1264, Duke Wartislaw III of Demmin died, his cousin Barnim I (the Good) became the sole ruler of the duchy. In 1266, Barnim I married Mechthild, the daughter of Otto III, Margrave of Brandenburg.

In 1269, Barnim lost the terra Arnswalde (Choszczno) to the margraves. Before his death, he bought the western part back in 1278.

Bogislaw IV lost the Bernstein (Pełczyce) area and Zinnenburg Land (terra Arnhausen and terra Schivelbein), in 1280. All former Pomeranian territories east of the Oder lost to Brandenburg in the 13th century became parts of the Brandenburgian Neumark ("new march").

=== War with Silesia ===
In 1234 and 1241, Silesian dukes Henry I and Henry II expanded their realm to the North, and even took control of areas north of the Warta river previously held by the Dukes of Pomerania. The Griffin dukes, Silesian Piasts, Dukes of Greater Poland, the bishops of Lebus and the bishops of Kammin all competed for the Warta/Noteć area, centered around the burgh of Santok. Until 1250, Barnim I, Duke of Pomerania had recovered most of the previous Pomeranian territory and sought to secure them with the settlement of Germans, while Zantoch burgh was held by Przemysł II of Greater Poland.

=== Competition for Schlawe-Stolp ===
The last member of the Ratiborides branch of the Griffins, Ratibor II, died in 1223. This led to a competition between the Griffins and the Pomerelian Samborides for inheritance of Schlawe-Stolp. Because Ratibor died during the Danish period, Denmark administered the area until she had to withdraw after the lost Battle of Bornhöved in 1227. Barnim I, Duke of Pomerania, took control of the lands immediately after the Danish withdrawal, but had to yield Pomerelian duke Swietopelk's rights, whose relationship to the Ratiborides was closer. Swietopelk took over Schlawe-Stolp in 1235–36. The Griffins mounted an unsuccessful campaigns to gain the area in 1236–38, 1253, 1259, and 1266. After the death of Świętopełk II in 1266, Barnim I took over the area and kept it until 1269, when Rugian prince Vitslav II took over. He withdrew in 1277 and left the area to Brandenburg. In 1283, Mestwin II of Pomerelia took over. Competition arose anew after his death in 1294. In 1296, Vitslav's son Sambor launched another campaign.

== Pomerania-Wolgast and -Stettin after the partition of 1295 ==
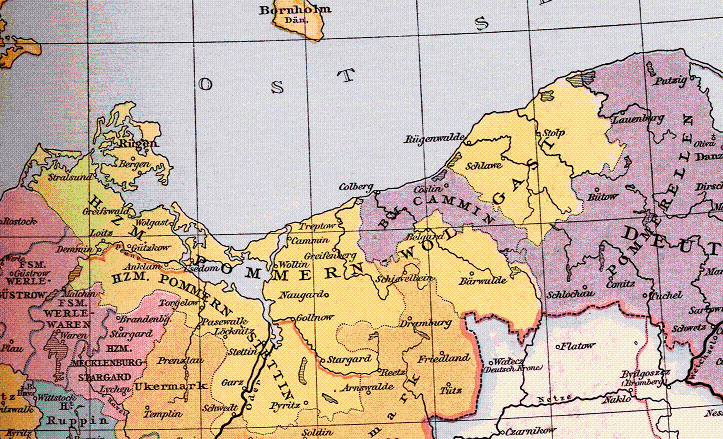
The Duchy of Pomerania (yellow) in 1400, P.-Stettin and P.-Wolgast are indicated; purple: Diocese of Cammin (BM. Cammin) and the Teutonic Order state; orange: Margraviate of Brandenburg; pink: duchies of Mecklenburg

The last duke of Demmin had died in 1264, and the 1236 territorial losses left Demmin at the westernmost edge of the Duchy of Pomerania.

When Barmin I, for a short period sole ruler of the duchy, died in 1278, his oldest son Bogislaw IV took his father's seat. When his half-brothers Otto I and Barnim II reached adulthood in 1294, the brothers ruled in common until Barnim's death in 1295. Bogislaw and Otto now agreed on a partition of the duchy, that would last until 1464: Bogislaw's share was the area where the towns were under Lübeck law, that was Vorpommern north of the Peene river (though including Anklam and Demmin on its southern bank) and Farther Pomerania north of the Ihna (Ina) and Stepenitz rivers, both areas were connected by the islands of Usedom and Wollin. Bogislaw made Wolgast his residence, thus the partition became known as Pomerania-Wolgast. Otto's share was the remainder between Peene and Ihna (Ina) centered around Stettin (Szczecin), where the towns were under Magdeburg law. This partition became known as Pomerania-Stettin.

A series of wars was triggered by Denmark in the early 14th century, when Eric VI Menved attempted to reestablish Danish rule in Northern Germany. Pomeranian and Rugian towns and dukes were involved in these wars in various and often opposing coalitions. Since 1314, a coalition consisting mainly of Waldemar of Brandenburg, Stralsund, and the Pomeranian dukes opposed a Danish-led coalition joined by Rugian duke Vitslav III. This war was ended by the Treaty of Templin in 1317. During this conflict, in 1315, Wartislaw IV of Pomerania-Wolgast, grandson of Rugian Vitslav II, made an agreement with Eric VI Menved's brother Christopher II of Denmark for inheritance of the Principality of Rügen.

Waldemar of Brandenburg died in 1319. Heinrich, his heir, was still a minor, and died in 1320. The Pomeranian dukes and Cammin bishops tried to take advance of Brandenburg's weakness. They did not only envision territorial gains, but also aimed at changing the status of the duchy from a fief of Brandenburg to a fief directly from the emperor. To achieve these goals, the dukes allied with various neighboring states, mounted military campaigns of which the first Battle of Kremmer Damm in 1332 was the most important, and gave their lands to the Cammin bishops (in 1320) and even to pope John XXII (in 1330 or 1331). In 1337, the Brandenburg margrave had to take the terrae Lippehne (Lipiany), Schivelbein (Świdwin) and Falkenburg (Złocieniec) (all in Neumark) as a fief from the Cammin (Kamień) bishops. In 1338, Barnim III of Pomerania-Stettin (Szczecin) was granted his part-duchy as a fief directly from the emperor, while Pomerania-Wolgast remained under formal Brandenburgian overlordship.

The towns Stettin (Szczecin), Greifenhagen (Gryfino), and Gollnow (Goleniów) in Pomerania-Stettin, concerned about a permanent division of the duchy in case Barnim III would not have children, rebelled in 1339 and sided with Pomerania-Wolgast in 1341. Barnim had to move his court to Gartz (Oder). On 12 June 1348 German king and later emperor Charles IV granted the Duchy of Pomerania as a whole and the Rugian principality as a fief to the dukes of both Pomerania-Stettin and Pomerania-Wolgast, erasing Brandenburg's claims, which however was not accepted by Brandenburg until 1529. The Pomeranian dukes and towns reconciled in 1344–54.

Barnim III, against the will of the burghers, erected a castle within Stettin's walls in 1346 (the old burgh had been leveled in 1249), and gained from Brandenburg the eastern parts of the Uckermark, that was in 1354 Pasewalk, in 1355 Schwedt, Angermünde, and Brüssow, and in 1359 (Torgelow).

=== Gain of Schlawe-Stolp (1317–47) ===
In 1316–17, the Griffin duke of Pomerania-Wolgast took over these areas as a fief from Waldemar of Brandenburg. In 1347, the area became fully attached to Pomerania-Wolgast. The lands of Stolp were pawned to the Teutonic Order from 1329 to 1341, the Bütow area was bought by the Knights in 1329 and thus remained outside Pomerania-Wolgast.

=== Gain of the Principality of Rügen (1325–1356) ===
The Rugian Prince Vitslav III died in 1325. Because of the earlier death of his son, he had no male heir, and Wartislaw IV of Pomerania-Wolgast took over the principality according to the 1315 agreement with Christopher II of Denmark. Yet, in the meantime Christopher's throne had been challenged by Valdemar III of Denmark, and Christopher had granted Rugia to Mecklenburg for her aid against his opponent. After Wartislaw died in 1326, Mecklenburg invaded the principality, triggering the First War for Rugian Succession (German: Erster Rügenscher Erbfolgekrieg). Wartislaw's minor sons were aided primarily by Greifswald and Demmin, but also by Stralsund, Anklam, and Valdemar III, who decisively defeated the Mecklenburgian army in 1328 near Völschow. In the subsequent Treaty of Brudersdorf, Mecklenburg withdrew her claims for 31,000 mark in silver. In exchange, the terrae Tribsees, Grimmen and Barth were pawned to her. When the Pomeranian dukes in 1340 were not able to bail out these lands, but refused to formally hand them over, the Second War for Rugian Succession (German: Zweiter Rügenscher Erbfolgekrieg). This time, the dukes of Pomerania-Wolgast were aided by those of Pomerania-Stettin and the Counts of Gützkow. After the Pomeranian forces defeated the Mecklenburgians in the Battle of Schopendamm near Loitz in 1351, they were able to take Grimmen and Barth in 1354 and Tribsees in 1356. Mecklenburg dropped her claims thereafter. Another party in these wars for Rugian succession was the bishop of Schwerin, who sought to enforce his claims by legal means, but was not successful in his appeals to various ecclesial courts.

== Partition of Pomerania-Wolgast (1368–72): Pomerania-Wolgast and Pomerania-Stolp ==
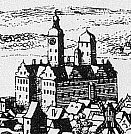
Wolgast palace, 1652

After the death of Barnim IV of Pomerania-Wolgast in 1366, an armed conflict arose when Barnim's brother Bogislaw V refused to share his power with Barnim's sons, Wartislaw VI and Bogislaw VI, and his other brother, Wartislaw V, who in turn allied with Mecklenburg to enforce their claims. On 25 May 1368 a compromise was negotiated in Anklam, which was made a formal treaty on 8 June 1372 in Stargard, and resulted in a partition of Pomerania-Wolgast.

Bogislaw V received most of the Farther Pomeranian parts. Excepted was the land of Neustettin (Szczecinek), which was to be ruled by his brother Wartislaw V, and was integrated into Bogislaw's part-duchy only after his death in 1390. This eastern part duchy became known as Pomerania-Stolp (Słupsk).

== Between the partition of 1368 and the reunification in 1478 ==
=== Further partition of Pomerania-Wolgast (1376–1425): Pomerania-Wolgast and Pomerania-Barth ===
The western remainder of Pomerania-Wolgast was further partitioned between Bogislaw IV and Wartislaw VI on 6 December 1376. Wartislaw VI received Pomerania-(Wolgast)-Barth, the former principality of Rügen, and Bogislaw IV's Pomerania-Wolgast was reduced to an area between Greifswald and the Świna river. When Bogislaw VI died in 1393 and Wartislaw VI in 1394, the latter's sons Barnim VI and Wartislaw VIII ruled in common.

On 6 December 1425 the western part of Pomerania-Wolgast (without Pomerania-Stolp) was partitioned again at a congress in Eldena Abbey, this time among the Wartislaw IX and his brother Barnim VII, who received the eastern part with Wolgast, and their cousins Swantibor II and his brother Barnim VIII, who received the Rugian part with Barth.

In 1456, the University of Greifswald was founded on behalf of Greifswald's burgomaster Heinrich Rubenow, becoming the first university of Pomerania and one of the oldest in northern Europe.

=== Pomerania-Stolp (Słupsk) ===
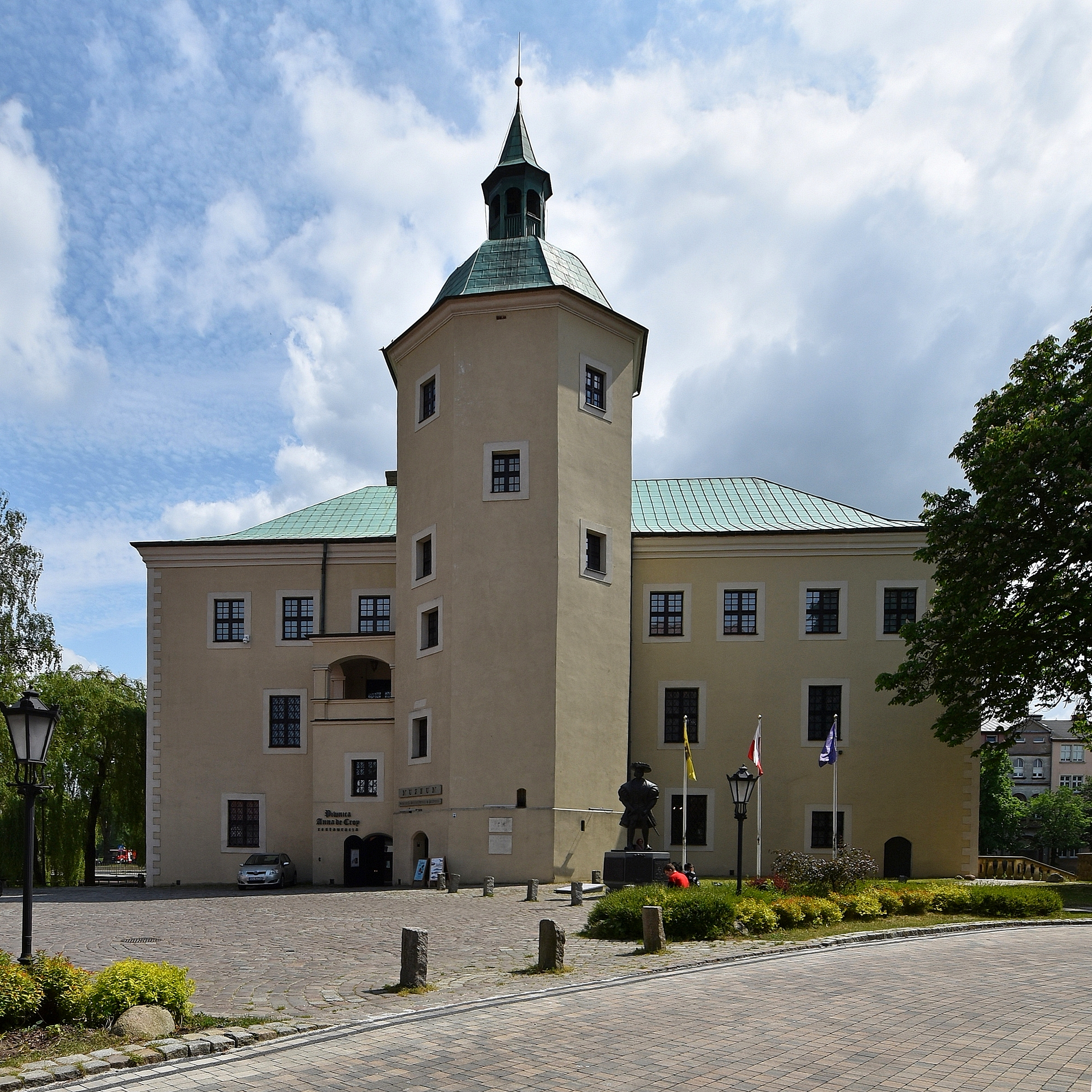
Słupsk castle

The situation of the descendants of Bogislaw V, who ruled Pomerania-Stolp, differed somewhat from the situation of their western counterparts. The area was more sparsely settled and dominated by powerful noble families, so not much income could be derived by the dukes. On the other hand, the Stolpian branch of the House of Pomerania had relatives among the royal houses of Denmark and Poland. Casimir IV and Elisabeth, the children of Bogislaw V and his first wife Elisabeth, the daughter of Casimir III of Poland, where both raised at the Polish court in Kraków. Elisabeth would become Holy Roman Empress after her marriage with Charles IV, and Casimir was adopted by and designated heir of his grandfather. Yet, his ambitions were swarted when Ludwig of Hungary overruled the testament of Casimir of Poland in 1370, Casimir of Pomerania-Stolp only for a short time took the land of Dobrin (Dobrzyń) as a fief. Eric II of Pomerania-Stolp, grand-grandchild of Danish king Valdemar IV in contrast became king of the Kalmar Union in 1397.

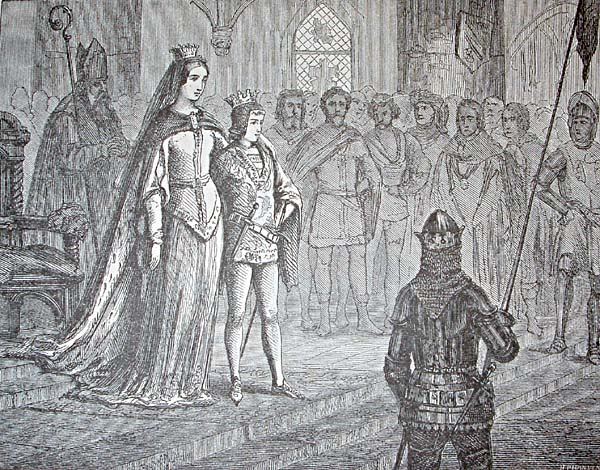
Eric of Pomerania crowned king of the Kalmar Union

Eric however failed in his most ambitious plan, to make Bogislaw IX of Pomerania-Stolp king of both the Kalmar Union and the Polish–Lithuanian Commonwealth. Eric had to leave Denmark in 1449 and ruled Pomerania-Rügenwalde, a small partition of Pomerania-Stolp, until his death in 1459.

Pomerania-Stolp was a crucial point in the Knights' land supply route. Bogislaw VIII of Pomerania-Stolp allied with both the Teutonic Knights and Poland, but supported the latter after the war had started in 1409 by blocking his lands for the Knights' troops and allowing his nobles to kidnap those who were travelling his lands. For his aid, he was granted the Lauenburg (now Lębork) and Bütow (now Bytów) areas (Lauenburg and Bütow Land) and others, but those were lost in the First Peace of Thorn in 1411.

=== Pomerania-Stettin ===
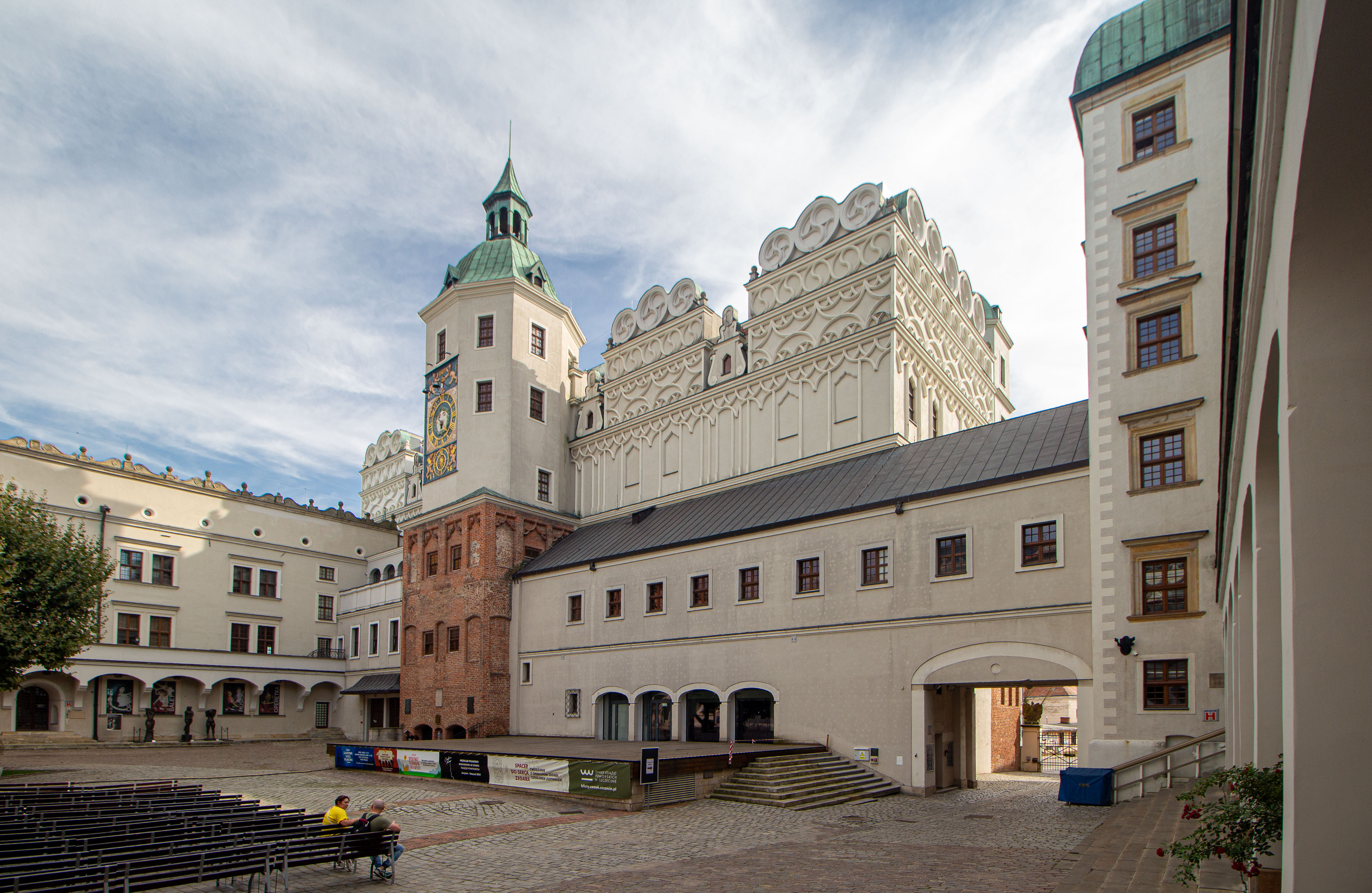
Pomeranian Dukes' Castle, Szczecin

Casimir V of Pomerania-Stettin at the same time allied with the Teutonic Knights and took part in the Battle of Grunwald, where he was caught by the Poles and bailed out by the Knights after the First Peace of Thorn.

The main concern of the Stettin dukes however was Brandenburg, namely the Neumark and Uckermark regions. Casimir III died in 1372 during a siege of Königsberg (Neumark) (Chojna), after he had managed to receive an Imperial approval of his Uckermark possessions in 1370. On 17 May 1373 all dukes of Pomerania concluded an alliance in Kaseburg, but situation eased when Otto VII, Margrave-elector of Brandenburg abdicated on 15 August 1373, and the House of Luxembourg took over the march on October 2 of the same year. In 1374, the Luxembourgians allied with all branches of the House of Pomerania. Pomeranian dukes even held positions in the march's administration.

When Brandenburg changed hands from the House of Luxembourg to the House of Hohenzollern on 11 January 1411 the dukes of Pomerania-Stettin (Szczecin) understood their position endangered and reacted with warfare. The first major battle was the second Battle of Kremmer Damm on 24 October 1412. While the dukes of Pomerania-Wolgast had sided with the emperor, disappointment over the emperors disapproval of ridding them of formal Brandenburgian overlordship in 1417 drove them to ally with their Stettin relatives and Mecklenburg. This coalition was backed by Denmark and Poland. A series of battles culminated in a decisive defeat on 26 March 1420 in the streets of Angermünde, and the Uckermark possessions were lost once again.

=== Polish–Teutonic Wars ===
In 1320 and 1325, Wartislaw IV of Pomerania-Wolgast allied with the Landmeister of the State of the Teutonic Order in Prussia against king Casimir III of Poland. When the Treaty of Kalisz had ended the subsequent Polish–Teutonic War (1326–32) in 1343, Wartislaw's sons Bogislaw V, Barnim IV and Wartislaw V changed sides, and Bogislaw V married Casimir III's daughter, Elisabeth. Barnim III of Pomerania-Stettin joined this alliance in 1348. After Poland and Lithuania had formed the Union of Krėva in 1385, and Poland had rejected the claims of Casimir III's grandson Casimir IV of Pomerania-Stolp, Bogislaw VIII and Wartislaw VII of Pomerania-Stolp in 1386 concluded an anti-Polish alliance with the Teutonic Knights, after they had settled their common border. In 1388, this alliance was joined by Swantibor I and Bogislaw VII of Pomerania-Stettin as well as Barnim VI and Wartislaw VI of Pomerania-Wolgast.

Later in 1388 however, the dukes of Pomerania-Stolp left this alliance and sided with Poland, who had promised to partially respect their claims as Casimir III's heirs. Thence, the nobles of Pomerania-Stolp robbed the Teutonic Knights and their supply routes, provoking a counter-attack that destroyed many noble strongholds and the fortifications of Köslin (now Koszalin). Bogislaw VIII, Barnim V and Wartislaw VII reacted by siding with Polish king Władysław II Jagiełło and concluding mutual trade alleviations.

When Wartislaw VII died, Bogislaw VIII and Barnim V concluded a treaty with the Teutonic Knights to safeguard their supply routes in turn for a financial credit. Swantibor I and Bogislaw VII of Pomerania-Stettin changed sides in 1395 and allied with the knights in turn for financial aid. Barnim V in 1397 concluded an alliance with Poland, married Vytautas' niece Hedwig and was in Władysław II Jagiełło's service in 1401 until he died in 1402 or 1404. Bogislaw VIII also entered into Władysław II Jagiełło's service, but changed sides in 1407–08, when he allied with the Teutonic Knights and settled their common border.

Nikolaus Bock, Cammin bishop from 1398–1410, had also sided with the knights before and placed his bishopric under their suzerainty. Wartislaw VIII of Pomerania-Wolgast allied with the knights in return for an assumption of a debt and additional payments. Swantibor I and Bogislaw VII of Pomerania-Stettin joined this alliance in 1409, after they had concluded a ten-year truce with the knights in return for debt cancellation before. When the knights lost the Battle of Grunwald in 1410, Bogislaw VIII of Pomerania-Stolp (Słupsk) changed sides again and allied with Poland in return for the Bütow (Bytów), Schlochau (Człuchów), Preußisch-Friedland (Debrzno), Baldenburg (Biały Bór), Hammerstein (Czarne) and Schivelbein (Świdwin) areas, which Poland had regained from the State of the Teutonic Order before. This was however cancelled by the First Peace of Thorn in 1411.

While Bogislaw VIII nevertheless upheld his alliance with Władysław II Jagiełło, Konrad Bonow of the Cammin diocese in 1414 concluded an alliance with the Teutonic Knights against both Bogislaw VIII and Władysław II Jagiełło, which was turned into a truce soon after. In 1417, Bogislaw VIII and the Teutonic Knights settled their common border in the Hammerstein area, ending their conflicts. Bogislaw VIII's son Bogislaw IX together with all other Pomeranian dukes in 1423 allied with the Teutonic Knights.

==== Gain of Lauenburg and Bütow Land (1455–67) ====
Eric II of Pomerania-Wolgast and successor of Bogislaw IX in Pomerania-Stolp again allied with Władysław II Jagiełło and his son and successor Casimir IV in his Thirteen Years' War against the Teutonic Knights. On 3 January 1455 he, in turn, was granted the Lauenburg and Bütow Land at the Pomerelian frontier. When Lauenburg (Lębork) was retaken by the knights in 1459, the Polish king was upset and ravaged the Stolp (Słupsk) area. Eric reconciled with the king on 21 August 1466, and bought the town from the knights on 11 October, six days before the Second Peace of Thorn, that was signed by Eric in 1467. King Casimir IV of Poland granted the area as a fief to the dukes of Pomerania and after the death of the last Duke Bogislaw XIV in 1637 the towns were re-integrated with Poland and included in the Pomeranian Voivodeship.

=== War with Brandenburg and the Hanseatic League (1423–1448) ===
On 15 September 1423 all Pomeranian dukes (including Eric) allied with the Teutonic Knights against Brandenburg and against the Hanseatic towns. In early 1425, this coalition was joined by Mecklenburg and Poland and successfully invaded Brandenburg. A peace treaty concluded on 22 May 1427 in Eberswalde, left Pomerania with the Uckermark north of Angermünde. On 16 June 1427 this was confirmed by the Treaty of Templin, which also included a coalition of Pomerania, Brandenburg and Mecklenburg. Yet, in 1440 Pomerania and Brandenburg invaded Mecklenburg, and in 1444 Brandenburg demanded from Pomerania to again hand over the Uckermark to her. When the Pomeranians refused, war broke out again. The first Treaty of Prenzlau in 1448 set the border south of Pasewalk.

== Bogislaw X becomes sole ruler of the duchy of Pomerania (1478) ==
Pomerania-Wolgast was reunited following the death of both Barnim VII and Barnim VIII in 1451. Both dukes died of the plague. The same disease caused the death of Joachim of Pomerania-Stettin (also in 1451), Ertmar and Swantibor, children of Wartislaw X, and Otto III of Pomerania-Stettin (all in 1464). Thus, the line of Pomerania-Stettin had died out.

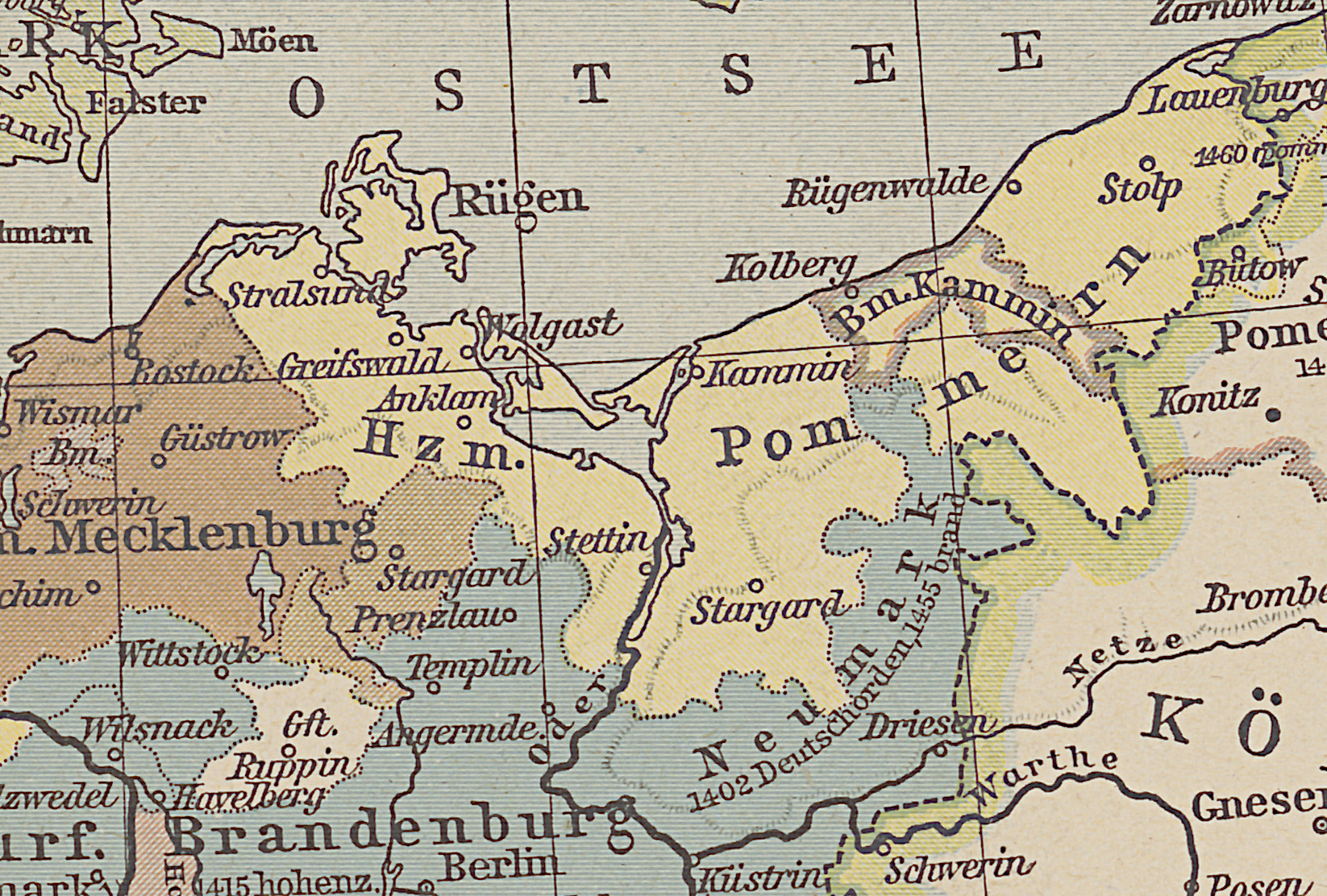
Duchy of Pomerania in 1477

The extinction of the House of Pomerania-Stettin triggered a conflict about inheritance with the Margraviate of Brandenburg. In the Treaty of Soldin of 1466, a compromise was negotiated: Wartislaw X and Eric II, the dukes of Pomerania, took over Pomerania-Stettin as a Brandenburgian fief. This was disputed already during the same year by the emperor, who intervened against the Brandenburgian overlordship of Pomerania. This led to a series of further warfare and truces, that were ended by the Treaty of Prenzlau of 1472, basically confirming the ruling of the Soldin treaty, but settling on a border north of Gartz (Oder) resembling Brandenburg's recent gains. This treaty was accepted by the emperor.

In 1474, Eric II died of the plague, and his son Bogislaw X inherited Pomerania-Stolp. Bogislaw's brothers had died the same year. After the death of his uncle Wartislaw X in 1478, he became the first sole ruler in the Duchy of Pomerania since almost 200 years.

Eric II had left Pomerania in tense conflicts with Brandenburg and Mecklenburg. Bogislaw managed to resolve these conflicts by both diplomatic and military means. He married his sister, Sophia, to Magnus II, Duke of Mecklenburg-Schwerin, and his other sister, Magarete, was married to Magnus' brother Balthasar. Bogislaw himself married Magareta, daughter of Brandenburg's Prince-elector Frederick II. Also, in 1478, Bogislaw regained areas lost to Brandenburg by his father, most notably the town of Gartz and other small towns and castles north of the Brandenburgian Uckermark. During the confirmation of the Peace of Prenzlau in 1479, the border was finally settled north of Strasburg and Bogislaw had to take his possessions as a fief from Brandenburg.

== Protestant Reformation (1518–1534) ==
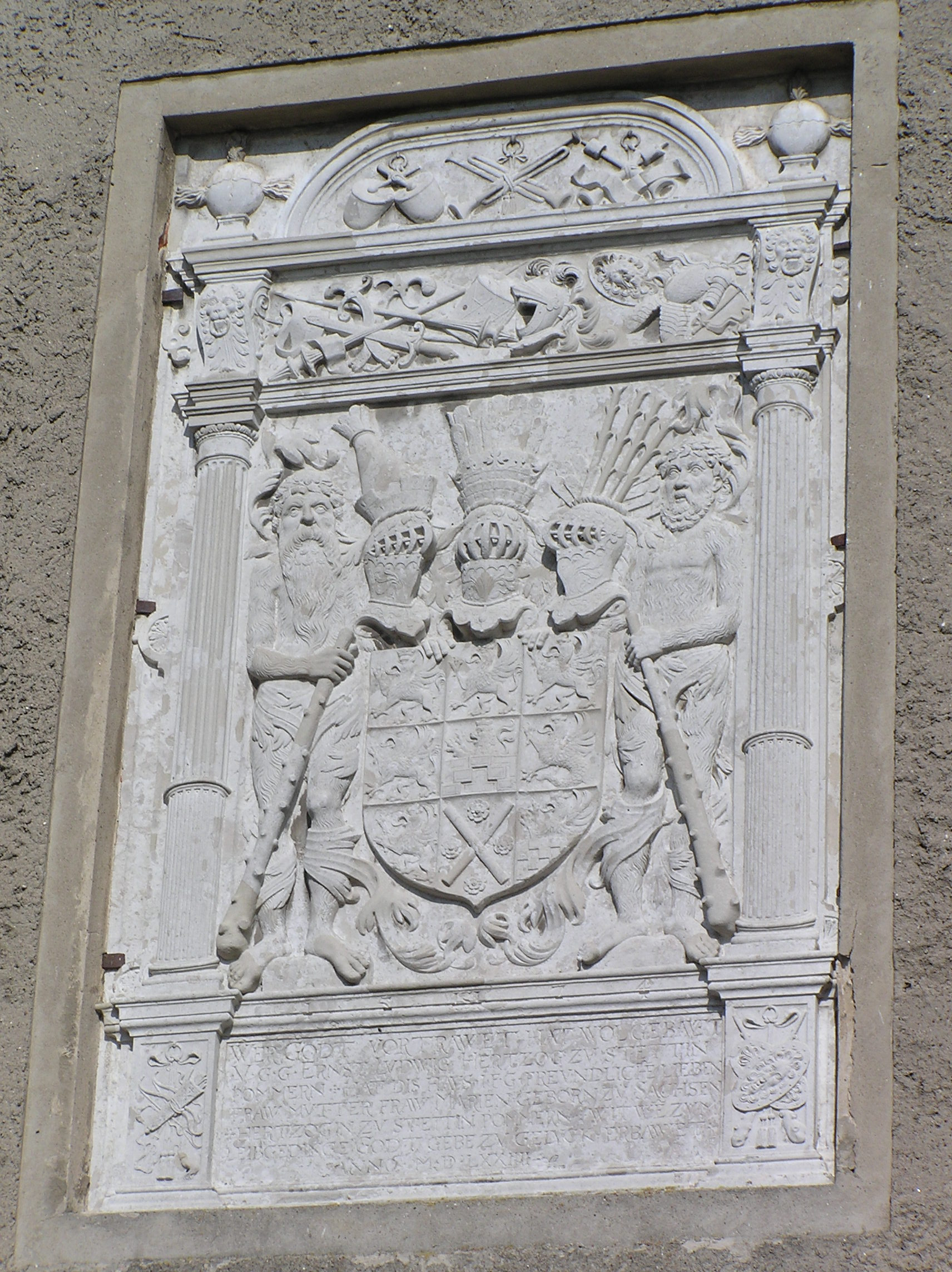
Coat of Arms of the House of Pomerania at Pudagla palace, secularized former Usedom Abbey

The Protestant Reformation reached Pomerania in the early 16th century. Bogislaw X in 1518 sent his son, Barnim IX, to study in Wittenberg. In 1521, he personally attended a mass of Martin Luther in Wittenberg, and also of other reformed preachers in the following years. Also in 1521, Johannes Bugenhagen, the most important person in the following conversion of Pomerania to Protestantism, left Belbuck Abbey to study in Wittenberg, close to Luther. In Belbuck, a circle had formed before, comprising not only Bugenhagen, but also Johann Boldewan, Christian Ketelhut, Andreas Knöpke and Johannes Kureke. These persons, and also Johannes Knipstro, Paul vom Rode, Peter Suawe, Jacob Hogensee and Johann Amandus spread the Protestant idea all over Pomerania. At several occasions, this went along with public outrage, plunder and arson directed against the church.

The dukes' role in the reformation process was ambitious. Bogislaw X, despite his sympathies, forbade Protestant preaching and tumults shortly before his death. Of his sons, George I opposed, and Barnim IX supported Protestantism as did Georg's son, Philip I. In 1531, George died, and a Landtag in Stettin (Szczecin) formally allowed Protestant preaching, if no tumults would arise from this. On 13 December 1534 a Landtag was assembled in Treptow an der Rega (Trzebiatów), where the dukes and the nobility against the vote of Cammin bishop Erasmus von Manteuffel officially introduced Protestantism to Pomerania. Bugenhagen in the following month drafted the new church order.

The Duchy of Pomerania joined the Schmalkaldic League, but did not actively participate in the Schmalkaldic War.

== Partition of 1532: Pomerania-Stettin and Pomerania-Wolgast ==
After Bogislaw X's death, his sons initially ruled in common. Yet, after Georg's death, the duchy was partitioned again between Barnim IX, who resided in Stettin (Szczecin), and Phillip I, who resided in Wolgast. The border ran roughly along the Oder and Świna rivers, with Pomerania-Wolgast now consisting of Hither or Western Pomerania (Vorpommern, yet without Stettin and Gartz (Oder) on the Oder river's left bank, and with Greifenberg on its right bank), and Pomerania-Stettin consisting of Farther Pomerania. The secular possessions of the Bishopric of Cammin around Kolberg (Kolobrzeg) subsequently came under control by the dukes, as from 1556 the titular bishops of Cammin were members of the ducal family.

Despite the division, the duchy maintained one central government.

== Further partitions in 1569 ==
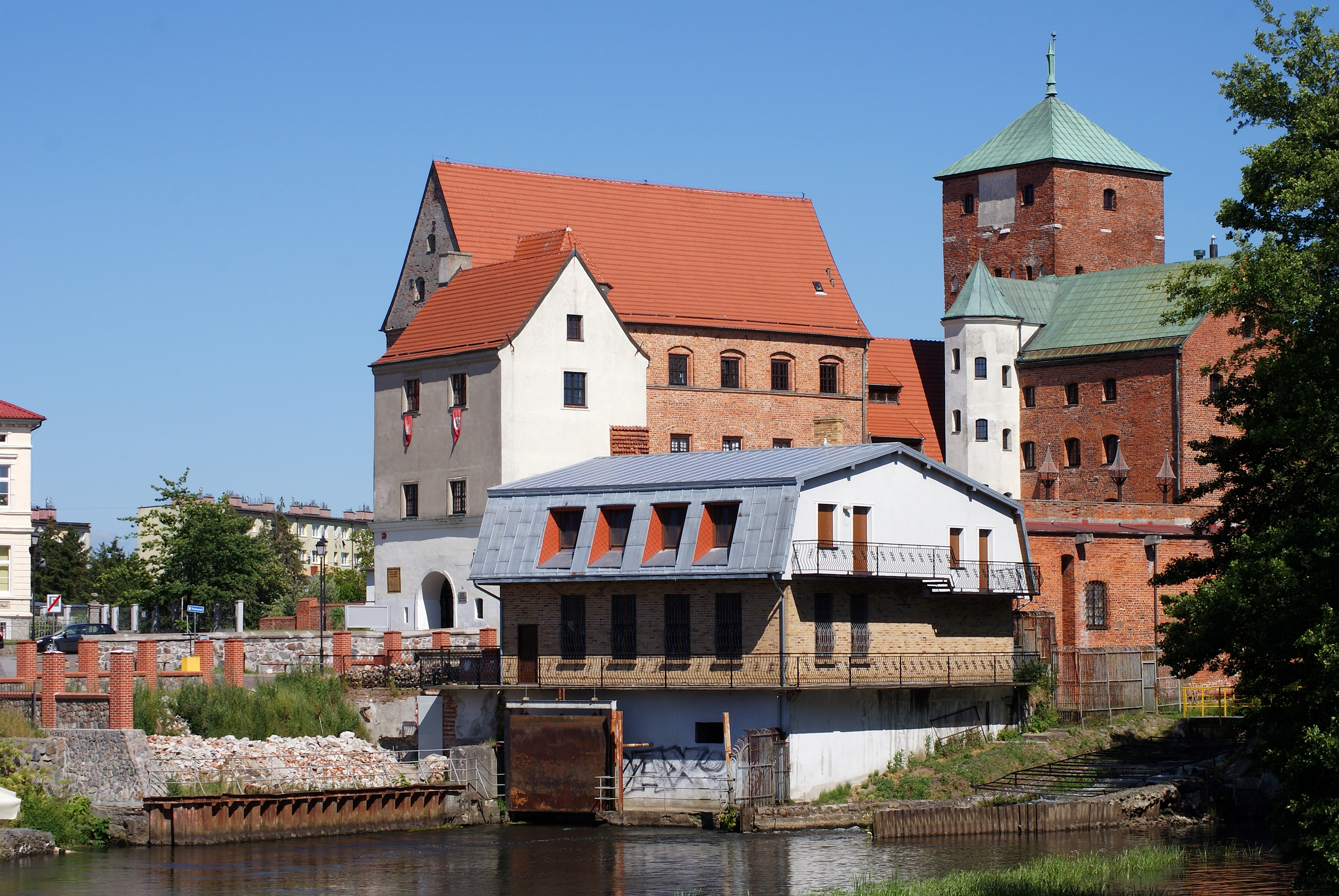
Ducal castle in Darłowo

In 1569, Pomerania-Barth (consisting of the area around Barth, Damgarten and Richtenberg) was split off Pomerania-Wolgast to satisfy Bogislaw XIII. In the same year, Pomerania-Rügenwalde (consisting of the areas around Rügenwalde and Bütow) was split off Pomerania-Stettin to satisfy Barnim XII. Though the partitions were named similar to the earlier ones, their territory differed significantly.

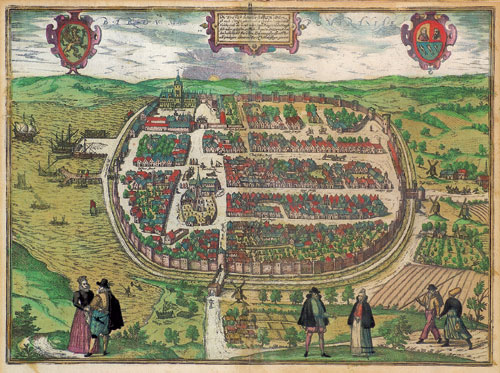
Barth with ducal palace in the upper left

In contrast to the partition of 1532, it was agreed that two governments were maintained in Wolgast and Stettin. Decisions of war and peace were to be made only by a common Landtag.

During the 1560s, Pomerania was caught between the Northern Seven Years' War for hegemony in the Baltic Sea and the struggle for hegemony in the Upper Saxon Circle of the Electorate of Saxony and Brandenburg. In 1570, the war in the Baltic ended with the Treaty of Stettin. In 1571–74, the duchy's status regarding Brandenburg was finally settled: While an agreement of 1529 ruled Brandenburg to succeed in Pomerania once the House of Pomerania died out in turn for the final rejection of Brandenburgian claims to hold Pomerania as a fief, it was now agreed that both ruling houses had a mutual right of succession in case of the extinction of the other one.

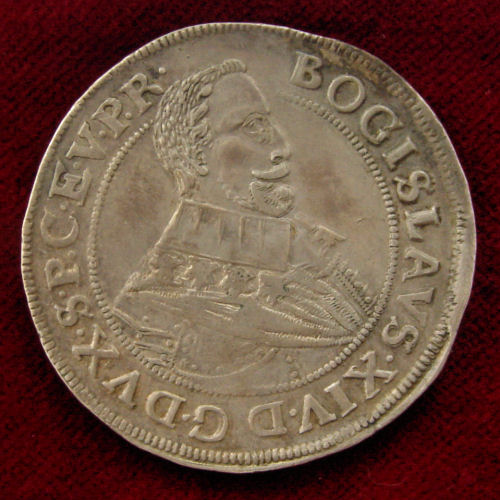
Coin showing Bogislaw XIV, last Duke of Pomerania

Also in 1571, a trade war between the towns Frankfurt (Oder) (Brandenburg) and Stettin (Pomerania), ongoing since 1560, was settled in favour of Brandenburg. The struggle within the Upper Saxon Circle however went on. The Pomeranian dukes Johann Friedrich and Ernst Ludwig refused to pay their taxes to the circle's treasury (Kreiskasten in Leipzig) properly, and in the rare cases they did, they marked it as a voluntary act. Furthermore, the dukes ratified the circle's decrees only with caveats that made it possible for them to withdraw at any time. The Pomeranian dukes justified their actions with events of 1563, when an army led by Eric of Brunswick crossed and devastated their duchy, and the circle did not give them support. On the other hand, the Pomeranian refusal to properly integrate in the circle's structure likewise reduced the circle's ability to act as a unified military power.

The partitioned duchy underwent an economical recession in the late 16th century. The dukes' ability to control the inner affairs of the duchy severely declined in the course of the 16th century. As the central power was weakened by the partitions and increasingly indebted, the independence of nobles and towns rose. Attempts of Duke Johann Friedrich to strengthen the ducal position, e.g. by introducing a general tax, failed due to the resistance of the nobility, who had gained the right to veto ducal tax decrees at the circle's convent. In 1594–1597, the duchy participated in the Ottoman Wars. Yet, due to the rejection of financial support by the nobility, the Pomeranian dukes' funds for the campaign were low, resulting in their humiliation during the war for fighting with bad horses and weapons.

== Reunification under Bogislaw XIV and partition between Sweden and Brandenburg ==
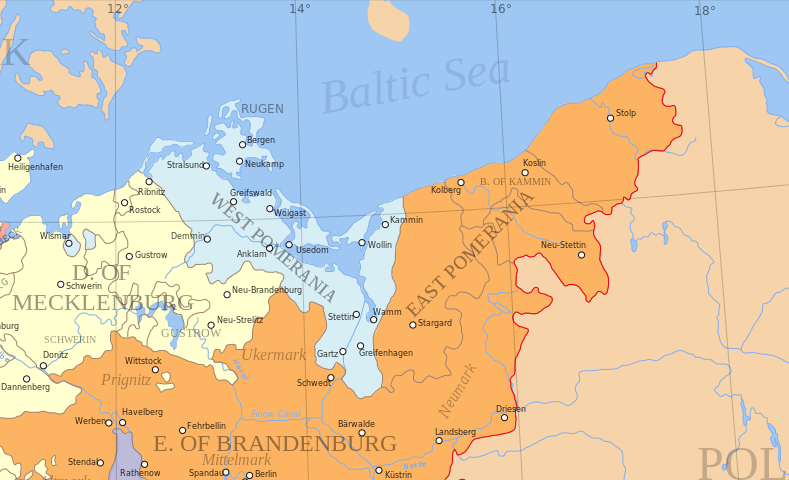
The former Duchy of Pomerania (center) partitioned between the Swedish Empire and Brandenburg after the Treaty of Stettin (1653). Swedish Pomerania (West Pomerania) is indicated in blue, Brandenburgian Pomerania (East Pomerania) is shown in orange.

Bogislaw XIV was the last Duke of Pomerania. In the course of the Thirty Years' War, the duchy was occupied first by Albrecht von Wallenstein's mercenary army after the Capitulation of Franzburg in 1627, and then by the Swedish Empire, which was appreciated and confirmed by Bogislaw in the Treaty of Stettin (1630). The duchy was finally dissolved after Bogislaw's death in 1637. With the 1648 Peace of Westphalia, Further Pomerania was assigned to Brandenburg-Prussia who held the rights for inheritance (Province of Pomerania (1653-1815)). Hither Pomerania stayed with the Swedish Empire and henceforth became known as Swedish Pomerania. The border was settled in the Treaty of Stettin (1653). Both parts were merged into the Prussian Province of Pomerania in 1815.

== Historical subdivisions ==
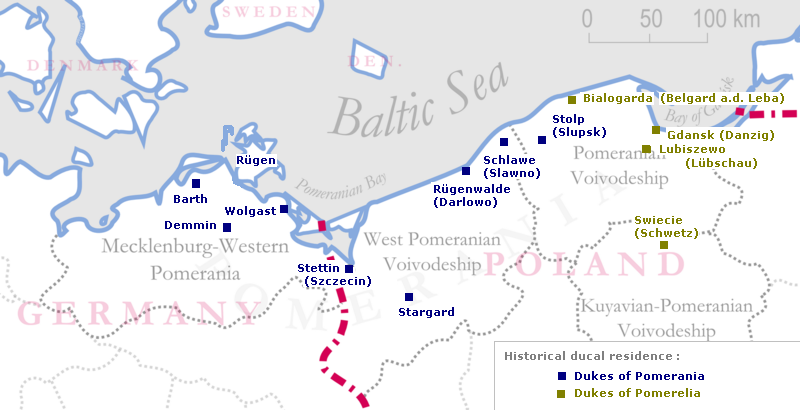
Location of the residence cities of the Dukes of Pomerania (blue) and Pomerelia (ocre) within the modern borders of Pomerania

Furthermore, several Pomeranian duchies were co-ruled by members of the House of Pomerania:

- Pomerania-Demmin (Dymin) from 1156 on under Duke Casimir I, fell to Duke Barnim I of Pomerania after the death of Duke Wartislaw III in 1264
- Pomerania-Stolp (Słupsk) in Stargard from 1368 on under Duke Bogislaw V the Old, fell to Duke Eric II of Pomerania-Wolgast after the death of Duke Eric in 1459
- Pomerania-Barth (Bardo) from 1376 on under Duke Wartislaw VI, fell to Bogislaw X of Pomerania after the death of Duke Wartislaw X in 1478; 1569–1605 residence of Duke Bogislaw XIII
- Pomerania-Rügenwalde (Darłowo), from 1569 on apanage of Duke Barnim X, incorporated into the Duchy of Pomerania-Stettin under Duke Bogislaw XIV in 1620

== Coat of arms ==
Coat of Arms since Bogislaw X's reform in 1530.

On 26 July 1530, the ducal coat of arms was reformed on behalf of Bogislaw X, Duke of Pomerania at the Reichstag in Augsburg. The ducal coat of arms since 1530 showed

1. Pomerania-Stettin: A red griffin on a blue shield. The shield had a golden color up to 1483, and Charles V, Holy Roman Emperor positively responded to Bogislaw X, Duke of Pomerania's request to change the blue back to golden to follow the heraldic rules. This change, however, was never implemented.
2. Pomerania: A red griffin on a silver shield.
3. Cassubia: A black griffin on a golden shield. Before 1530, this was the coat of arms of Wolgast.
4. Wenden: A griffin colored with three green and red stripes on a silver shield. Earlier, this griffin was red with silver wings.
5. Principality of Rügen: A black lion, sometimes with a red crown, on a golden shield growing from an open red brick wall on a blue shield.
6. Usedom: A silver griffin with a sturgeon tail on a red shield.
7. Pomerania-Barth: A black griffin with two white fields on a golden shield.
8. County of Gützkow: A red cross with 4 red roses in its angles on a golden shield.
9. Pomerania-Wolgast: A white griffin on a red shield growing from an open golden brick wall on a blue shield. From 1325 to 1530, Pomerania-Wolgast had a black griffin on a golden shield. The Putbus coat of arms had been identical with the post-1530 Wolgast coat of arms, except for the color of the lower shield, which was black, and the description of the beast as an eagle.
10. Another empty regalia field.

Before 1530, the coat of arms had five fields, showing four griffins symbolizing Pomerania-Stettin, Pomerania, Wenden, Cassubia, and an empty regalia field.

== See also ==
- History of Pomerania
- House of Pomerania (House of Griffins)
- Pomeranian duchies and dukes
- Pomeranian language
- Kashubian language
- section Brick Gothic in former Duchy of Pomerania in the article Brick Gothic

== Bibliography ==
- Piskorski, Jan Maria (1999). Pommern im Wandel der Zeiten (in German). Zamek Ksiazat Pomorskich. ISBN 8390618486.
- Buchholz, Werner, ed. (2002). Pommern (in German). Siedler. ISBN 3-88680-780-0.
- Krause, Gerhard; Balz, Horst Robert (1997). Müller, Gerhard (ed.). Theologische Realenzyklopädie. De Gruyter. ISBN 3-11-015435-8.
- Herrmann, Joachim (1985). Die Slawen in Deutschland (in German). Berlin: Akademie-Verlag. ISBN 3-515-07671-9.
- Inachin, Kyra (2008). Die Geschichte Pommerns (in German). Rostock: Hinstorff. ISBN 978-3-356-01044-2.
- Addison, James Thayer (2003). Medieval Missionary: A Study of the Conversion of Northern Europe Ad 500 to 1300. Kessinger Publishing. ISBN 0-7661-7567-7.
- Nicklas, Thomas (2002). Macht oder Recht: frühneuzeitliche Politik im Obersächsischen Reichskreis (in German). Franz Steiner Verlag. ISBN 3-515-07939-4.
- Buske, Norbert (1997). Pommern (in German). Schwerin: Helms. ISBN 3-931185-07-9.
- Köbler, Gerhard (2007). Historisches Lexikon der Deutschen Länder: die deutschen Territorien vom Mittelalter bis zur Gegenwart (in German) (7 ed.). C.H.Beck. ISBN 978-3-406-54986-1.
- Palmer, William (2005). A Compendioius Ecclesiastical History from the Earliest Period to the Present Time. Kessinger Publishing. ISBN 1-4179-8323-X.
- Calhoun, Craig J.; Gerteis, Joseph; Moody, James; Pfaff, Steven; Virk, Indermohan (2002). Contemporary Sociological Theory. Blackwell Publishing. ISBN 0-631-21350-3.
- Zientara, Benedykt; Smolka, Stanisław; Loew, Peter Oliver (2002). Heinrich der bärtige und seine Zeit: Politik und Gesellschaft im mittelalterlichen Schlesien (in German). Oldenbourg Wissenschaftsverlag. ISBN 3-486-56615-6.
- Willoweit, Dietmar; Lemberg, Hans (2006). Reiche und Territorien in Ostmitteleuropa: Historische Beziehungen und politische Herrschaftslegitimation (in German). Oldenbourg Wissenschaftsverlag. ISBN 3-486-57839-1.
- Boockmann, Hartmut (1992). Die Anfänge der ständischen Vertretungen in Preussen und seinen Nachbarländern (in German). Oldenbourg Wissenschaftsverlag. ISBN 3-486-55840-4.
- du Moulin Eckart, Richard (1976). Geschichte der deutschen Universitäten (in German). Georg Olms Verlag. ISBN 3-487-06078-7.
- Köhne, Boris Vasilyevich (1842). Koehne's Zeitschrift für Münz-, Siegel- und Wappenkunde (in German) (2 ed.). E.S. Mittler.
- Grote, Hermann (1862). Münzstudien (in German). Akademische Druck- u. Verlagsanstalt.
- Spiess, Karl-Heinz; Auge, Oliver (2003). Medien der Kommunikation im Mittelalter (in German). Franz Steiner Verlag. ISBN 3-515-08034-1.
- Maclear, George Frederick (1969). Apostles of Mediaeval Europe. Ayer Publishing. ISBN 0-8369-2803-2.
- Medley, D. J. (2004). The church and the empire. Kessinger Publishing. ISBN 1-4191-5673-X.
