= Miroslava of Pomerelia =

Miroslava of Pomerelia (died 1240), was a Duchess consort of Pomerania by marriage to Bogislaw II, Duke of Pomerania. She was the regent of Pomerania during the minority of her son Barnim I, Duke of Pomerania between 1220 and 1233.

She was born to Mestwin I, Duke of Pomerania, and married Bogislaw II, Duke of Pomerania.
