= Wartislaw III =

Wartislaw III (Polish: Warcisław III) (c. 1210 – 17 May 1264) was a Griffin duke of Pomerania-Demmin. Son of Casimir II of Pomerania-Demmin and Ingardis of Denmark, he was married to a Sophia of an unknown house. As he did not have any children, Pomerania-Demmin ceased to exist with his death.

Ingardis ruled Pomerania-Demmin in place of young Wartislaw from Casimir's death 1219 until 1226. At that time, Pomerania-Demmin as well as the other part duchy Pomerania-Stettin were under Danish overlordship, which diminished after the 1227 Battle of Bornhöved and was finally dismissed when Wartislaw successfully countered a Danish expedition in 1234 with his Lübeck allies.

1236 was a harsh year for Pomerania-Demmin, as Wartislaw lost a great part of his possessions to his rivaling neighbors Mecklenburg and the Margraviate of Brandenburg. First, a Mecklenburgian expedition led by Henry Borwin III of Mecklenburg-Rostock annexed most of Circipania, the western part of the duchy comprising the terrae Gnoien, Altkalen and Demmin, leaving only the residential burgh of Demmin under Wartislaw's control. Also, Wartislaw had to recognize Brandenburg's overlordship over the remainder of his duchy in the 1236 Treaty of Kremmen. In the same treaty, he ceded the terrae Stargard, Wustrow and Beseritz to Brandenburg, which soon after were taken over by Mecklenburg and became known as Mecklenburg-Strelitz.

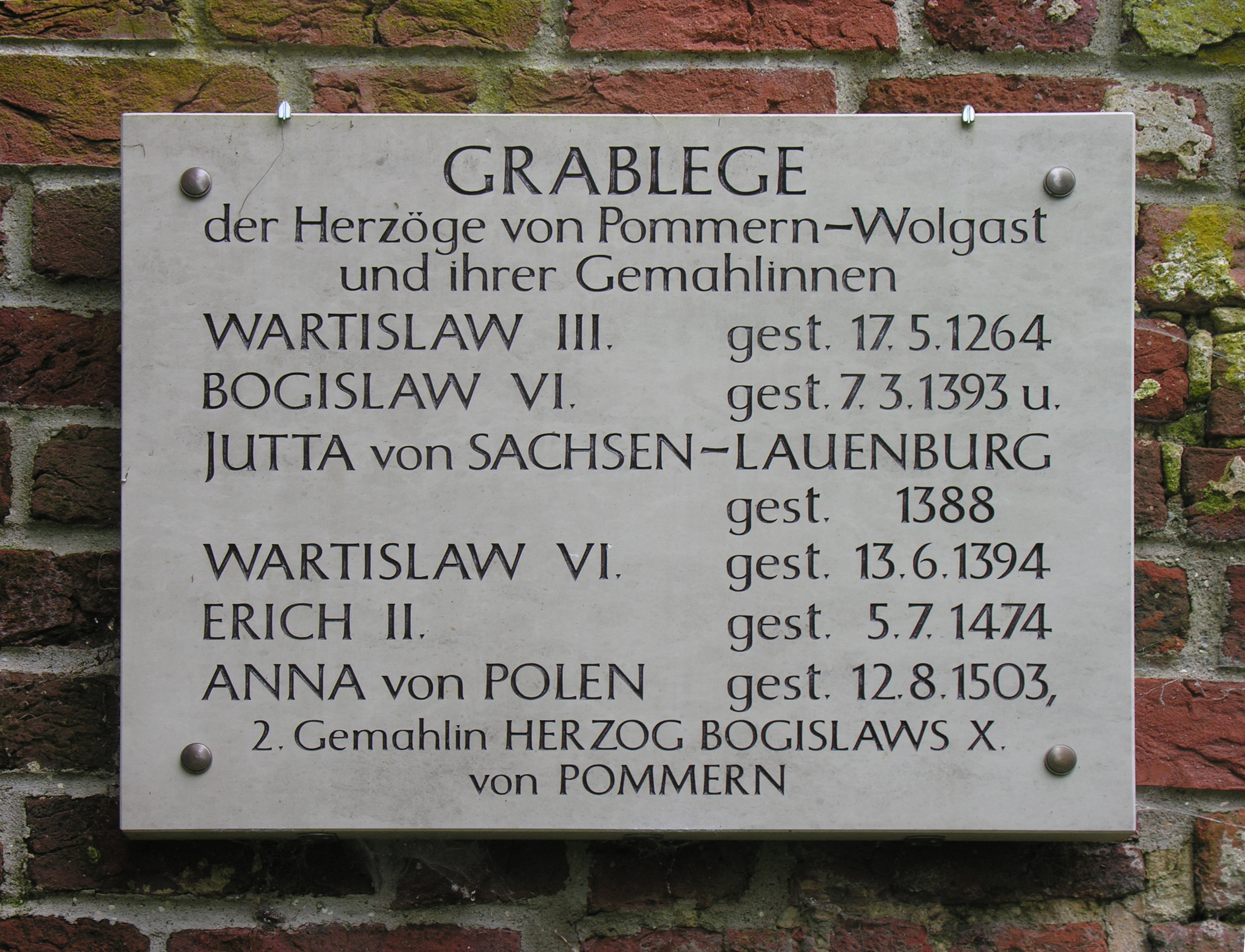
Burial site of Wartislaw III in Eldena Abbey (Greifswald, Western Pomerania)

Yet, in the North, Wartislaw was able to expand his sphere of influence up to the Ryck river into the territory of Hilda, now Eldena Abbey set up there by the princes of Rügen. Wartislaw involved into developing Eldena's market and coastal settlement Greifswald by granting it market rights together with the Rugian prince and received the town as a fief from Eldena in 1248.

Besides his struggles with his neighbors, Wartislaw enforced the Ostsiedlung in his duchy like his cousin and Pomeranian co-ruler Barnim I of Pomerania-Stettin. He invited German nobles to join his court and settlers to develop the countryside, also, he granted German town law in its Lübeck law specification to the growing towns of Greifswald (1250), Demmin (~ 1250), Kolberg (now Kołobrzeg) (1255, along with Cammin bishop Hermann von Gleichen), Greifenberg (now Gryfice) (1262), also, together with Barnim I of Pomerania-Stettin, Wolgast (1257), Wollin (now Wolin) (1262) and Stavenhagen (1252).

When Wartislaw died without leaving a son, Pomerania-Demmin would have fallen to Brandenburg, if Barnim I had not been accepted as co-ruler in the 1250 Treaty of Landin and therefore integrated what was left of Pomerania-Demmin after the territorial losses of 1236 into his Stettin-based duchy. Wartislaw III's and his mother Ingardis' burial site is Eldena Abbey near Greifswald.

== See also ==
- List of Pomeranian duchies and dukes
- History of Pomerania
- Duchy of Pomerania
- House of Pomerania

== Sources ==
- Dietmar Lucht: Herzog Wartislaw III. von Pommern. In: Baltische Studien, Neue Folge Bd. 53, 1967, pp. 13–15.
- Edward Rymar: Rodowód Książąt pomorskich, Szczecin 2005, pp. 151–154.

Wartislaw III House of Pomerania Born: ~ 1210 Died: May 17, 1264
Preceded by Casimir II	Duke of Pomerania-Demmin; 1219–1264	Succeeded by Barnim I of Pomerania-Stettin
