= Heinrich Rubenow =

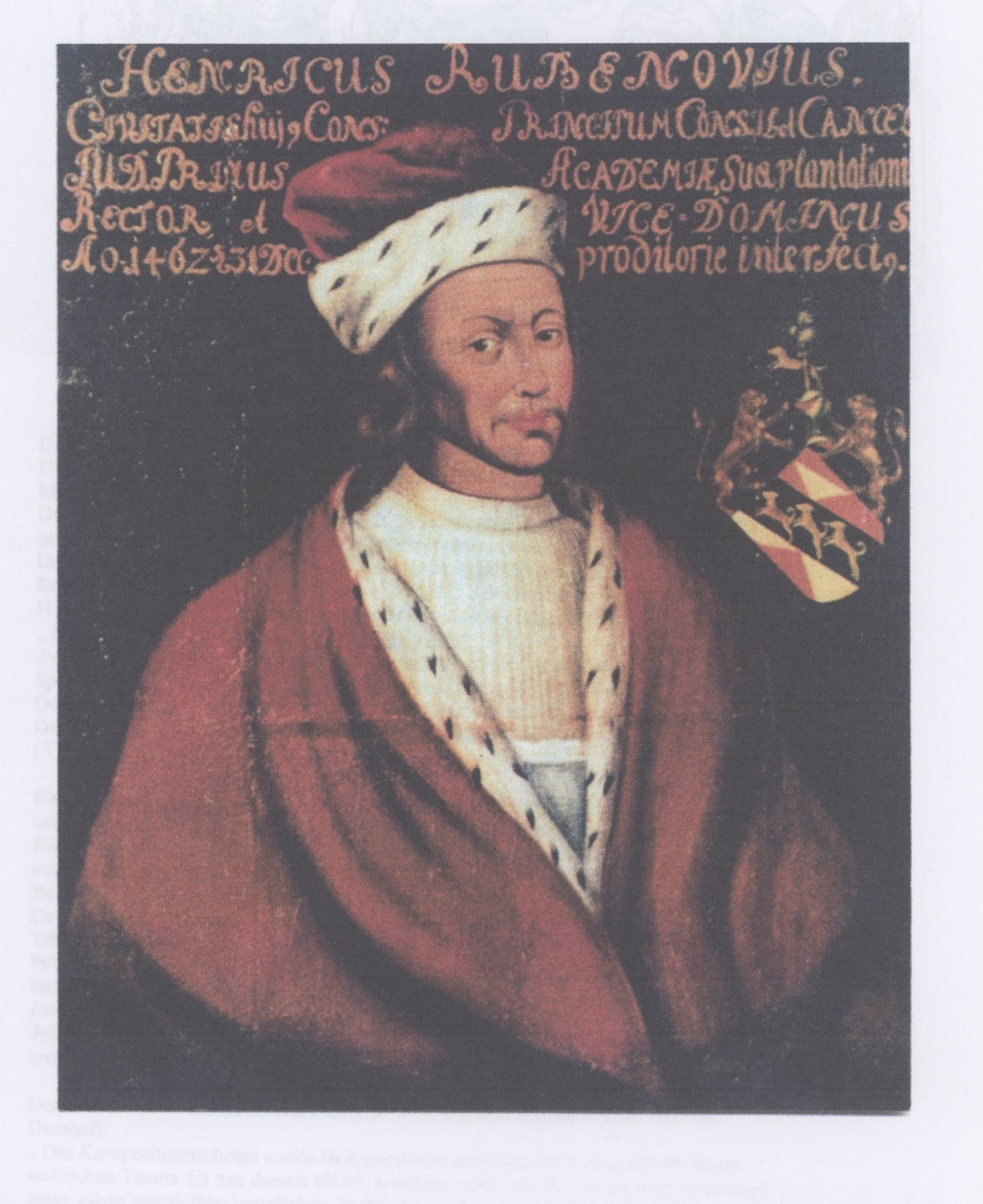
- Coat of arms of the Greifswald Rubenow family
- Born: c. 1410; Greifswald, Duchy of Pomerania
- Died: December 31, 1462 (aged 52); Greifswald, Duchy of Pomerania
- Occupations: Jurist; civic leader; mayor
- Known for: Founder and first Rector of the University of Greifswald
- Office: Bürgermeister of Greifswald

Heinrich Rubenow (c. 1410 – 31 December 1462) was a Pomeranian civic leader, jurist, and the principal founder of the University of Greifswald. A prominent figure in the political and intellectual life of fifteenth‑century Greifswald, he served multiple terms as Bürgermeister and played a decisive role in securing ducal and papal approval for the establishment of the university in 1456.

== Early life and education ==
Rubenow was born in Greifswald into a prominent patrician family active in the city's civic administration. Although details of his early life are sparse, he is believed to have received a formal education typical of the urban elite of the Baltic region. He later pursued legal studies, which formed the basis of his subsequent civic and academic career.

== Political career ==
Upon returning to Greifswald, Rubenow became deeply involved in the city's governance. He served as a Ratssyndikus (legal adviser) and later as Bürgermeister. His tenure was marked by efforts to strengthen the city's legal and administrative structures, and he emerged as a leading figure in Greifswald's political life during a period of significant regional change.

== Founding of the University of Greifswald ==
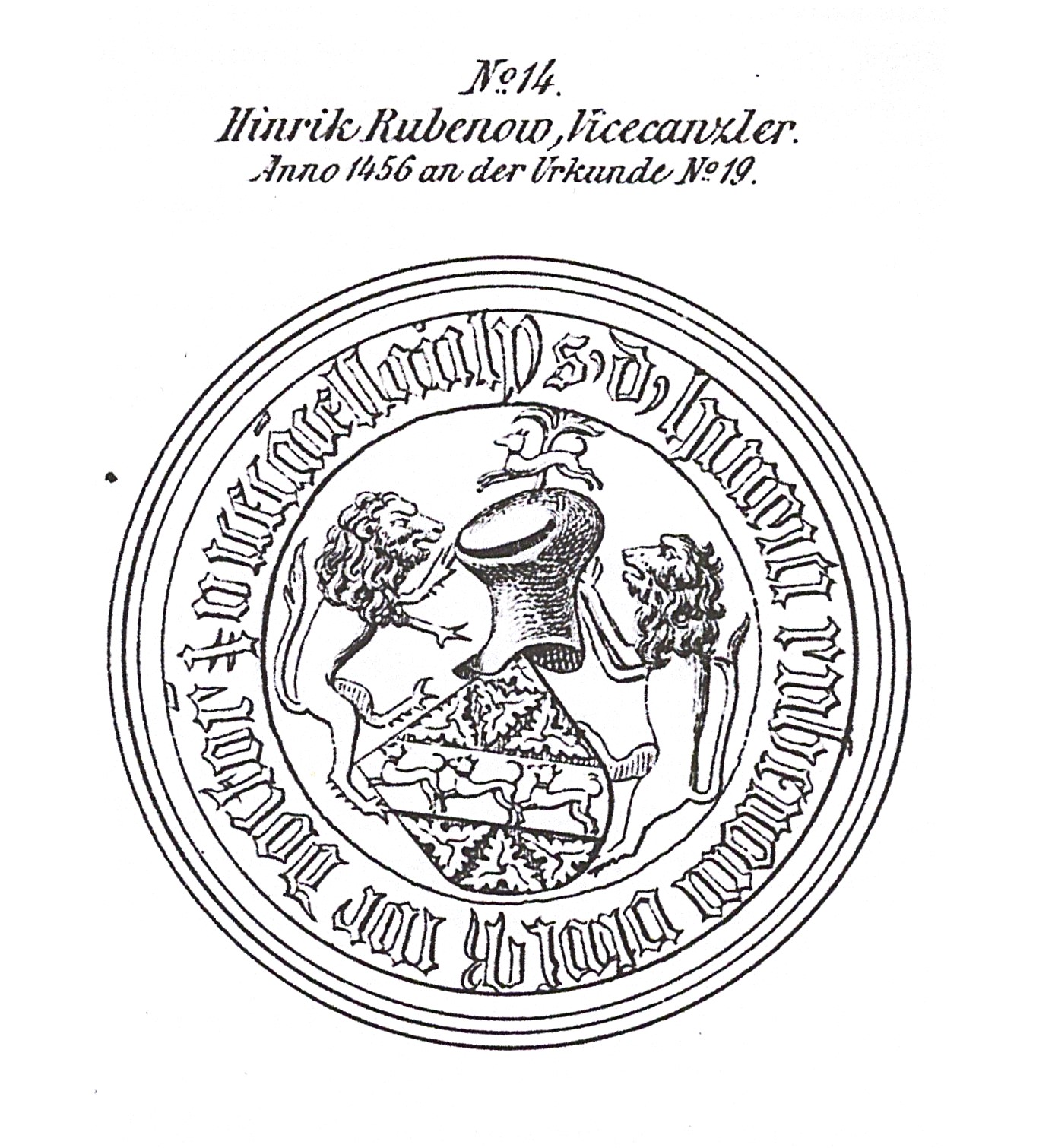
Coat of arms of the Medieval Rubenow family of Greifswald, Germnany

Rubenow played the decisive role in establishing a university in Greifswald. He secured the support of Duke Wartislaw IX of Pomerania and obtained papal approval for the foundation. The university was formally inaugurated in 1456, making it one of the oldest institutions of higher learning in northern Europe. Rubenow became its first Rector and was instrumental in shaping its early structure, statutes, and academic culture.

== Death ==
Rubenow's prominence in Greifswald's civic and academic life made him a central figure in the city's political struggles. His reforms and consolidation of authority as Bürgermeister intensified long‑standing tensions between patrician families, guilds, and competing factions within the council. These conflicts culminated in a violent confrontation at the end of 1462.

On 31 December 1462, Rubenow was murdered in Greifswald by political opponents during a period of acute civic unrest. Contemporary and later chronicles describe the killing as the result of factional hostility rather than personal dispute. His death marked one of the most turbulent episodes in the city's medieval history and had lasting repercussions for its governance.

== Legacy ==
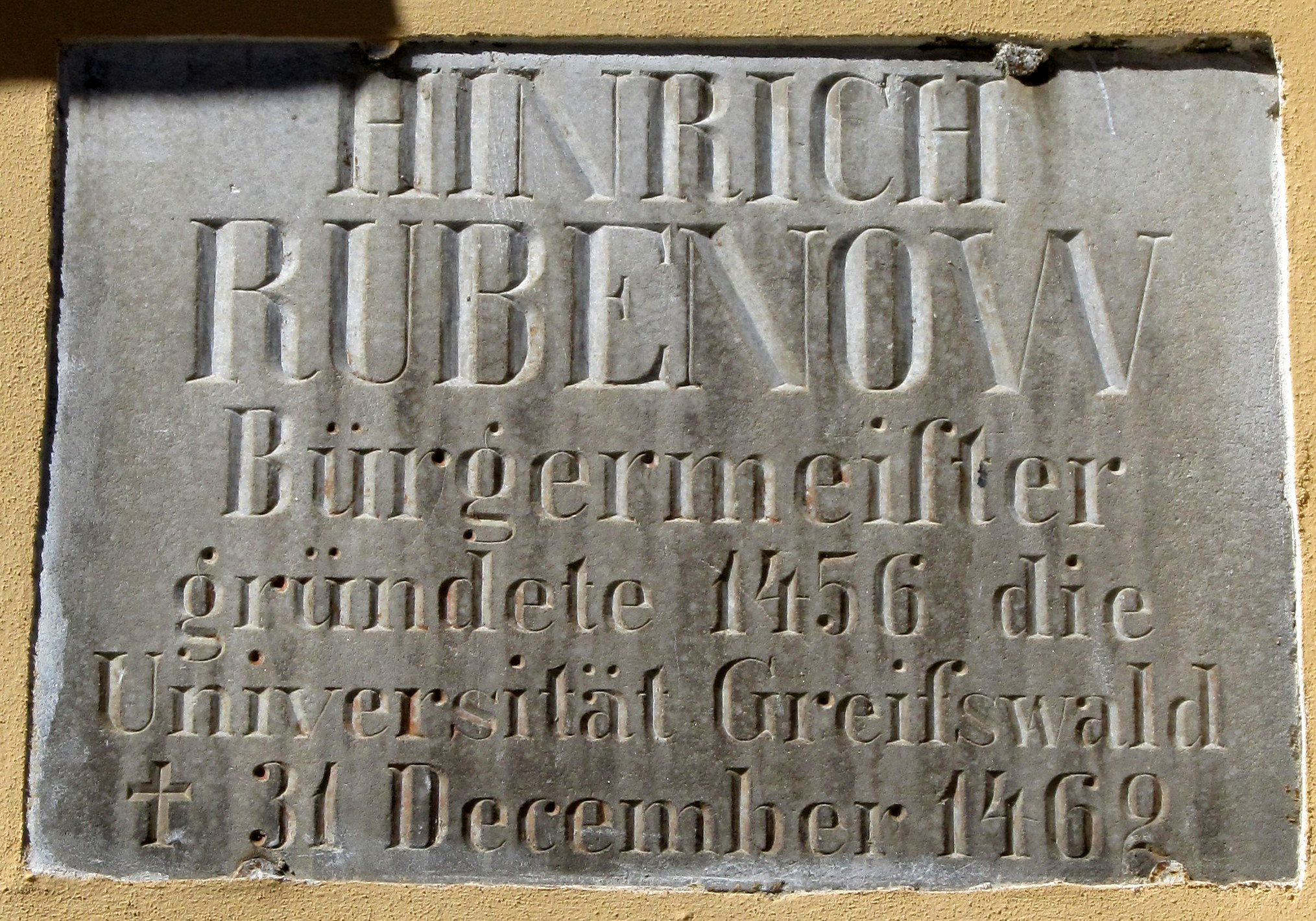
Commemorative plaque for Heinrich Rubenow in Greifswald.

Rubenow is regarded as one of the most influential figures in the early history of Greifswald and the wider region of Pomerania. His leadership was instrumental in securing the establishment of the University of Greifswald, which continues to acknowledge his foundational role in its commemorative publications and institutional histories.

His contributions to Greifswald's civic administration and legal structure also left a durable imprint on the city's development. Modern genealogical interest in the Rubenow family has been supported by privately printed family histories and local historical traditions.
