= Casimir II of Pomerania =

Casimir II
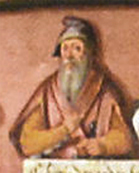

Duke of Pomerania-Demmin
- Tenure: 1187–1219
- Predecessor: Wartislaw II
- Successor: Wartislaw III
- Born: c. 1180
- Died: 1219
- Spouse: Ingard of Denmark
- House: Griffin
- Father: Bogislaw I, Duke of Pomerania
- Mother: Anastasia of Greater Poland

Casimir II (also spelled Kasimir II) (Polish: Kazimierz II pomorski) (c. 1180 – 1219) was the duke of Pomerania-Demmin from 1187 until his death. He was succeeded by Wartislaw III, Casimir's son with princess Ingardis of Denmark.

== Biography ==
Casimir II was the son of Bogislaw I and Anastasia, a daughter of the Polish duke Mieszko III. After his father's death in 1187, Casimir received Pomerania-Demmin as his share of the duchy of Pomerania, after his older brother Bogislaw II had received the other part duchy Pomerania-Stettin and his other older brother, Wartislaw II, who is assumed to have received Pomerania-Demmin from their uncle, Casimir I in the first place, had died in 1184.

As Casimir still was a minor in 1187, his mother Anastasia ruled in his place until 1194 as well as, until 1189, the Swantiboride Wartislaw II Swantiboritz, who was Castellan of Szczecin, and thereafter the Rugian prince Jaromar I. Despite his predecessors having joined the Holy Roman Empire in 1181, Casimir and Bogislaw II had to yield to Danish pressure put on Pomerania. Denmark had already subdued the neighboring Principality of Rügen, and Bogislaw and Casimir eventually became vassals to Canute VI of Denmark.

The Danish influenced Casimir's reign not only by appointing Jaromar, their vassal and ally, to be his legal guardian, but also by determining the northern borders of Pomerania-Demmin that were disputed by Pomerania and Rügen, with Rügen claiming the Peene river and Pomerania claiming the Ryck river further north to be the border. The decision of Canut that had to be accepted by Anastasia favoured the Rugian demands, only the trans-Peene terrae Wolgast, Lassan and Ziethen were put under Pomeranian control with the larger part of the disputed area, including the terrae Lositz (Loitz) and Wostrose (Wusterhusen), remaining within Rügen.

In 1198 and 1199, margrave Otto II of Brandenburg occupied Pomerania-Demmin in the course of a war between Brandenburg and Denmark, shifting Casimir's realm north close to the Ryck river. When Valdemar II of Denmark regained Pomerania in 1202, Casimir and Bogislaw II had to accept Danish overlordship again and turned to support Denmark in her war with Brandenburg. In 1216, the border between Rügen and Pomerania was settled again, pushing it back almost to where it were before the Brandenburgian occupation. As Rügen had founded the Hilda (now part of Greifswald district Eldena) abbey in 1199 at the southern bank of the Ryck river and had granted vast areas of the disputed areas to her, Casimir and Bogislaw confirmed these grants in 1218 by pointing out that these lands righteously had been theirs.

He married Ingardis of Denmark (d. c. 1236) in 1210. Together, they had a son, Wartislaw III who would succeed him as duke of Pomerania-Demmin, and a daughter, Elisabeth.

== See also ==
- List of Pomeranian duchies and dukes
- History of Pomerania
- Duchy of Pomerania
- House of Pomerania

== Sources ==
- Gottfried von Bülow (1876). "Bogislav I.". Allgemeine Deutsche Biographie (in German). Vol. 3. Leipzig: Duncker & Humblot. pp. 40–41.
- Häckermann (1876). "Bogislav II.". Allgemeine Deutsche Biographie (in German). Vol. 3. Leipzig: Duncker & Humblot. pp. 41–42.
- Joachim Wächter: Das Fürstentum Rügen – Ein Überblick. In: Beiträge zur Geschichte Vorpommerns: die Demminer Kolloquien 1985–1994. Thomas Helms Verlag, Schwerin 1997, ISBN 3-931185-11-7.
- Martin Wehrmann: Geschichte von Pommern. Band 1, Weltbild Verlag 1992, Reprint der Ausgaben von 1919 und 1921, ISBN 3-89350-112-6, pp 91–95.

Casimir II of Pomerania House of Pomerania Born: ~ 1180 Died: 1219
Preceded by Wartislaw II	Duke of Pomerania-Demmin; 1187–1219	Succeeded by Wartislaw III
