= Casimir I of Pomerania =

Casimir I
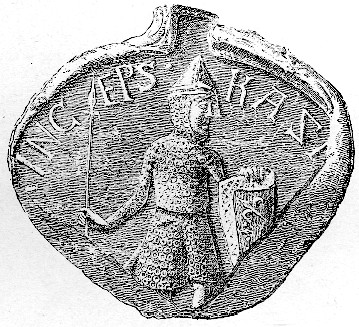

Duke of Pomerania-Demmin
- Tenure: 1156–1180
- Predecessor: Ratibor I
- Successor: Wartislaw II
- Born: after 1130
- Died: 1180
- Spouse: Pritolawa
- House: Griffin
- Father: Wartislaw I, Duke of Pomerania

Casimir I (or Kasimir I) (after 1130 – 1180) was duke of Pomerania since his uncle Ratibor I's death in 1155/56. A son of Wartislaw I, he co-ruled Pomerania with his older brother Bogislaw I, receiving Pomerania-Demmin as his share just as Bogislaw received Pomerania-Stettin, and ruling the remainder in common.

After the lost 1164 Battle of Verchen, where Casimir and Bogislaw aided an Obodrite rebellion against the duke of Saxony, Henry the Lion, Casimir and Bogislaw joined Saxony receiving their respective part duchies as a fief from Henry the Lion. Casimir also received one third of the Danish terra Wolgast. When Saxony allied with the Danes to subdue the Rani kingdom of Rügen in 1168, Casimir as well as Bogislaw aided Henry. Casimir also managed to take control in Circipania, thereby expanding Pomerania to the West.

Casimir participated in other campaigns launched by Henry the Lion, as an 1178/79/80 expedition into Lusatia and Jüterbog. However, Casimir suffered heavy losses at the battle at Julin Bridge and later died in 1180 in a battle with Brandenburg margrave Otto I, having no children yet with his wife Pritolawa. Pomerania-Demmin was then governed by his brother Bogislaw and later by Bogislaw's second son Casimir II, his first son Bogislaw II receiving Pomerania-Stettin, so Pomerania would further be governed in a manner resembling the reign of Casimir I and Bogislaw I.

Casimir founded monasteries in Broda (1170) and Belbuck (1177). He participated in founding the monastery Dargun (1172/74) and in 1176/80 granted privileges to the bishopric of Wollin that moved its seat to Cammin (now Kamień Pomorski) because of Danish expeditions.

Casimir I of Pomerania House of Pomerania Born: before 1130 Died: fall 1180
| Preceded by Ratibor I | Duke of Pomerania-Demmin; 1155/56–1180 | Succeeded by Wartislaw II |

== See also ==
- List of Pomeranian duchies and dukes
- History of Pomerania
- Duchy of Pomerania
- House of Pomerania
