= Ingard of Denmark =

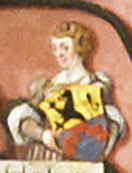
Dutchess Regent of Pomerania, Ingard of Denmark

Ingardis or Ingard of Denmark (died 1236) was a Duchess of Pomerania by marriage to Casimir II, Duke of Pomerania. She was regent during the minority of her son Wartislaw III, Duke of Pomerania in 1219–1226.

Ingardis was from Denmark. Traditionally, she has often been claimed to be a princess of Denmark.

She married Casimir II in 1210. Together, they had a son, Wartislaw III who would succeed as duke of Pomerania-Demmin, and a daughter, Elisabeth.

Ingardis ruled Pomerania-Demmin in place of young Wartislaw from Casimir's death 1219 until 1226. At that time, Pomerania-Demmin as well as the other part duchy Pomerania-Stettin were under Danish overlordship, which diminished after the 1227 Battle of Bornhöved and was finally dismissed when Wartislaw successfully countered a Danish expedition in 1234 with his Lübeck allies.
