= Bogislaw II of Pomerania =

Bogislaw II, Duke of Pomerania
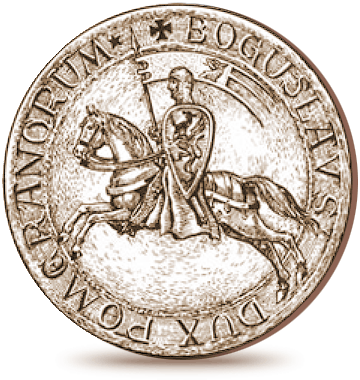
- Born: c. 1177
- Died: 23 January 1220
- Buried: Keniz
- Noble family: House of Griffin
- Spouse: Miroslawa of Pomerelia
- Issue Detail: Barnim I, Duke of Pomerania
- Father: Bogislaw I, Duke of Pomerania
- Mother: Anastasia of Poland

Bogislaw II (c. 1177 – 23 January 1220) was Duke of Pomerania-Stettin from 1187 until his death.

== Life ==
Bogislaw II was a son of Bogislaw I and his second wife, Anatasia, the daughter of Mieszko III of Poland. He was still a minor when his father died in 1187. Bogislaw and his brother Casimir II stood under the regency and guardianship of their mother and Castellan Wartislaw II of Stettin from the Swantiborides side line, who is referred to in official documents as a governor or vicedominus terrae.

After a failed attempt to break away from Danish sovereignty, Anastasia and her sons had to go to Denmark, to be enfeoffed with Pomerania in person by the Danish king. One consequence of the Danish influence was that during the war against Jaromar I of Rugia, Jaromar was made guardian and administrator, replacing Wartislaw, and in the Peace of Nyborg, Pomerania lost the disputed areas around Wolgast and Loitz.

In 1209, the Dukes of Pomerania started another war against Jaromar I and the city of Stralsund that was flourishing under his protection. This war was also unsuccessful and the conflict was settled at the Danish diet of 1216. Danish sovereignty was confirmed and the ties with Denmark were strengthened by a marriage between Casimir and the Danish princess Ingardis.

Soon afterward, war broke out between Denmark and Brandenburg. Margrave Otto II defeated the Danish army under Peter of Roskilde and occupied Pomerania. However, he could not permanently claim Pomerania and it remained under Danish sovereignty. During the ensuing throne dispute between Philip of Swabia of the House of Hohenstaufen and Otto IV of the House of Guelph, King Valdemar II of Denmark took control of northern Germany. Denmark reached the peak of its power and Valdemar ruled as King of the Danes, Slavs, Jutes and Nordalbingians. This occupation was even recognized by the Empire, in the sense that, when the Guelph emperor Otto IV allied himself at Weißensee with Margrave Albert II, Valdemar allied himself with the Hohenstaufen emperor Frederick II. In 1214 in Metz, Frederick II enfeoffed Valdemar with all German and Slavic territories north of the Elbe and Elde rivers, and this enfeoffment was confirmed by the Pope.

Brandenburg attacked Valdemar's German territories, however, Valdemar and the Pomeranian dukes repelled these attacks. After this success and the boundary changes with Rugia in 1216, Pomerania began to gain strength and flourish. Sovereignty of the Dukes over Gützkow and Demmin was secured and the economy and culture were stimulated by the immigration of German settlers and by the monastery Jaromar I had founded at Eldena. Also important was the presence of bishop Christian, who converted the apostate Prussians. Christian and the dukes repopulated the deserted monastery at Dargun. In 1218, the frail bishop Sigwin of Cammin died and was succeeded by his provost, the more vigorous Conrad II. Bogislaw joined the crusade against the Prussians.

Casimir II died in 1217 during a pilgrimage to the Holy Land. After Casimir's death, Bogislaw ruled alone. This period was mostly peaceful.

Bogislaw II died on 23 January 1220. According to legend, he was buried in Keniz, a fortress he had built on the border between Pomerania and Brandenburg.

== Marriage and issue ==
Bogislaw II was married to Miroslawa, a daughter of Duke Mestwin I of Pomerelia. They had four children:

- Barnim I (c. 1210 – 1278)
- Bogislav III, Prince Slavensky
- Woislawa (d. 1229)
- Dobroslawa, married:
  1. either Nicholas or Wartislaw of Gützkow
  2. Jaczo I of Salzwedel

== Footnotes ==
Bogislaw II of Pomerania House of Pomerania Born: c. 1177 Died: January 23, 1220
Preceded by Bogislaw I	Duke of Pomerania-Stettin; 1187–1220	Succeeded by Barnim I
