= Vitslav II of Rügen =

Vitslav II

Prince of Rügen
- Reign: 20 August 1260 – 29 December 1302
- Predecessor: Jaromar II
- Successor: Vitslav III
- Born: 1240
- Died: 29 December 1302 (aged 61–62)
- Spouse: Agnes of Braunschweig-Lüneburg
- Issue: Vitslav III, Prince of Rügen; Jaromar, Bishop of Cammin; Euphemia of Rügen
Names
- German: Wizlaw II von Rügen
- House: House of Wizlaw
- Father: Jaromar II, Prince of Rügen
- Mother: Euphemia of Pomerellia

Vitslav II (c. 1240 – 1302), variously called Vislav, Vizlav, Wislaw, Wizlaw and Witslaw in English sources (German: Wizlaw II) was a prince of Rügen.

== Life ==
Vitslav was probably born between 1240 and 1245 as the son of Prince Jaromar II of Rügen and Euphemia, a daughter of Duke Swantopolk II of East Pomerania. After his father, who had taken part on the side of the church in battles in Denmark between the Danish royal house and the Archbishopric of Lund. When his father was stabbed to death by a woman in 1260 out of revenge, Vitslav became the reigning Prince of Rügen.

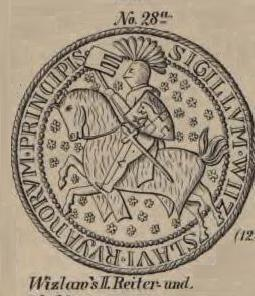
Vitslav's seal

From the beginning of his reign Vitslav II maintained good relations with the Hanseatic town of Lübeck, whose merchants he exempted from customs duties within his principality and with whom, in 1266, he renewed the existing trade agreements. In 1269, he supported the town of Stralsund, located within his territory, by withdrawing rights from the Schadegard, built in the immediate vicinity of Stralsund, and gave up the town founded in order to compete with Stralsund.

Probably over claims to the dowry of his mother, a daughter of Prince Swietopelk of East Pomerania, he succeeded in 1270 in gaining possession of the enfeoffment of Schlawe. Possibly in the same year, but no later than 1271, he founded Rügenwalde, but sold his enfeoffments in 1277, after he had been driven out of the area in 1275 by Mestwin II. The territory of Schlawe (Schlawer Land) with its town and Rügenwalde went to Margrave John II, Otto IV and Conrad of Brandenburg.

In 1282, he joined the Livonian Crusade, leaving his brother Jaromar III behind as regent.

On 13 June 1283, the Treaty of Rostock alliance (Rostocker Landfriedensbündnis) was agreed between the cities and towns of Lübeck, Wismar Rostock, Stralsund, Greifswald, Stettin, Demmin and Anklam with Duke John I of Saxe-Lauenburg, the Mecklenburg prince, Bogislaw IV of Pomerania and Vitslav II of Rügen. This alliance was clearly directed against Brandenburg.

In 1283, Vitslav II was given his territory as German fiefdom by the German king, Rudolf I of Habsburg, although the document probably referred only to the mainland element. The Rügen-Danish fief relationship continued, as the regular participation of Vitslav II at the Danish court and his nomination as a witness in Danish royal charters indicates. Among other things, he was present at the investigation of the murder of the King of Denmark Erik Klipping.

In 1285, he granted town rights to Tribsees. In 1290 the town of Stralsund was given the right of herring fishing on the Wittow and commercial monopoly on the island of Rügen, which severely hampered, the development of trade and commerce, including the grain trade, in the next few centuries. In 1288 Greifswald was given the Greifswald Saltworks and, in 1297, the right to build a port in Wieck by the mouth of the Ryck. He extended the possessions of the monasteries located in the principality: Eldena and Neuenkamp Abbeys.

== Descendants ==
Vitslav II married between 1263 and 1269 Agnes of Brunswick-Lüneburg, the daughter of Duke Otto I, the Child of Brunswick and Matilda of Brandenburg. The names of four sons and four daughters are known from the Vitslav's testament dated 27 December 1302:

1. Vitslav III of Rügen, co-regent from 1286
2. Jaromar (born around 1267 – died 1294), rector at Stralsund St. Nicholas', later Bishop of Cammin from 1288 to 1294
3. Euphemia (born around 1280 – died 1321), married King Hakon V of Norway
4. Sambor (born around 1267 – died 4 June 1304), from 1302 co-regent with Vitslav III, probably died in battles in Farther Pomerania (Hinterpommern)
5. Margaret (born around 1270/71 – died 1318), married 1284 Duke Bogislaw IV of Pomerania-Wolgast
6. Swantepolk (born around 1273 – died after 1285)
7. Helena (born around 1271 – died 9 August 1315), married:
  1. 1288 Prince John III of Mecklenburg,
  2. 1299 Prince Bernard II of Anhalt-Bernburg
8. Sophia (born around 1281 – died after 1302), only mentioned in the testament, lived with Euphemia in Norway

Vitslav II of Rügen House of Vitslav Born: c. 1240 Died: 1302
| Preceded by Jaromar II | Prince of Rügen; 1260–1302 | Succeeded by Vitslav III |
