= Jaromar I of Rügen =

Jaromar I was a Prince of Rügen between 1170 and 1218.

== Background ==
Jaromar was a Ranish nobleman, who was a native of the island of Rügen. Jaromar rose to be ruler of the Principality of Rügen as result of the Danish conquest of Rügen in 1168. His predecessor was Tetzlav, who in 1168 had submitted to the Danish.

== Danish conquest ==
The Danish organized a war to Christianize the formerly pagan islanders and to destroy the pagan strongholds and cult places. This action also served to have their piracy and raids to Danish lands ended. The Danish navy, led by among other militaries, Archbishop Absalon, conquered and destroyed the fortress of Cape Arkona. The temple fortress of Arkona (Jaromarsburg) had been the religious centre of the Slavic Rani. The island of Rügen was incorporated into the Danish Archdiocese of Roskilde.

The Danish set up Rügen as their vassal. Jaromar, who was not committed to hitherto pagan rulers of the island, accepted Christianity and promised loyalty to King Valdemar I of Denmark.

Jaromar allied with the Hvide and Galen magnate clans, who were leaders of Zealand and Skåne. Jaromar had his son and heir Wizlaw I marry a lady from these Danish magnates' families, who were influential in those parts of Denmark that were closest to Rügen.

By 1185, Jaromar I had started construction of St. Mary's Church (Marienkirche) erected in his stronghold Rugard (which later became the town Bergen-auf-Rügen). In 1193, the church was completed and then consecrated as a monastery church, making it Rügen's oldest maintained building. It is commonly believed that Jaromar was buried under the gravestone embedded in the church's outer wall. Additionally he founded the Cistercian Eldena Abbey (Kloster Eldena).

== Family ==
He married Hildegard, illegitimate daughter of Canute V of Denmark, and had a son, Vitslav, who succeeded him.

== Other sources ==
- Buchholz, Werner Deutsche Geschichte im Osten Europas. Pommern (Siedler Verlag. 2002) ISBN 3-88680-780-0
- Addison, James Thayer Medieval Missionary: A Study of the Conversion of Northern Europe Ad 500 to 1300 (Kessinger Publishing. 2003) ISBN 0-7661-7567-7.
