= Wars of the Rügen Succession =

Military conflict

The Wars of the Rügen Succession were two early 14th century conflicts fought primarily between Mecklenburg and Pomerania for control of the Danish Principality of Rügen on the southern Baltic Sea coast.

== Background ==
The temple fort (Tempelburg) on Arkona, later known as Jaromarsburg, was taken in 1168 by the Danes under King Valdemar I and Bishop Absalon of Roeskilde. Afterwards the princes of Rügen had to recognise Danish suzerainty. On their accession to power, the Rügen princes were forced to confirm their allegiance to the Danish king and were obliged to provide military support to the Danes.

In 1304 Vitslav III of Rügen gained sole lordship over the territory on the death of his brother, Sambor. Because he had no children at that time, Rügen's princely house risked becoming extinct, so in 1310 at Ribnitz he agreed to a contract of inheritance with his feudal lord, the Danish king Eric VI Menved. It said that in the event of Vitslav's death without issue, the fiefdom of Rügen would return to the Danish crown. At that time, Eric VI Menved was attempting to extend his power in the southern Baltic Sea region in order to reduce the influence of Hanseatic towns like Stralsund. In addition to the princes of Rügen, the king also had Prince Henry II of Mecklenburg as a vassal. After the death of Eric VI Menved in 1319, the 1310 treaty lapsed and Vitslav III sought allies in the Pomeranian dukes. On 5 May 1321 dukes Otto I of Pomerania, Vartislav IV of Pomerania-Wolgast and Barnim III of Pomerania-Stettin reached a mutual inheritance contract with Vitslav III of Rügen. But a previous alliance agreement of 25 October 1315 between Vartislav IV, the son of Vitslav's sister, Margaret, and Eric's brother, Christopher of Halland, who later became King Christopher II of Denmark, Vartislav IV had already been promised the Rügen fiefdom.

== First War of the Rügen Succession ==
With the death of Vitslav on 8 November 1325, the male line of Rügen's princely house was extinguished. Vartislav IV took over the Principality of Rügen and expected to be enfeoffed by King Christopher II. An uprising in Denmark, however, forced Christopher to flee Denmark and seek refuge with his Mecklenburg vassals. On 4 May 1326 Christopher promised the princes of Mecklenburg and Werle the fiefdom of the Rügen estates. But in early June, Christopher met Vartislav in Barth and presented him with the seven enfeoffment flags (Lehensfahnen). In order to protect himself, on 14 July 1326, Vartislav forged an alliance with the new Danish power behind the throne, Count Gerhard III of Holstein, guardian of the young king, Valdemar III of Denmark, who was a minor.

When Vartislav IV died on 1 August 1326, after a short illness, he left three sons who were under age. Gerhard of Holstein recognized them as his successors. Christopher II, living in Mecklenburg, however, awarded the fief of Rügen on 6 August to Henry II of Mecklenburg and the princes of Werle, who were to provide him with military support to recover the Danish throne. In late summer of 1326, Henry took advantage of the situation and occupied the western territories on the mainland that belonged to the Principality of Rügen. The towns of Barth and Grimmen surrendered after a short siege. Loitz surrendered without a fight.

The Hanseatic towns of Stralsund, Greifswald, Anklam and Demmin allied themselves with the Holstein count. Vartislav's widow and children took refuge in Greifswald. In September 1326, Gerhard of Holstein advanced on Stralsund with 600 horsemen and recaptured Loitz. After negotiating a ceasefire agreement with Mecklenburg he returned to Denmark in October 1326. Soon afterwards the dukes of Pomerania-Stettin were given guardianship of their Wolgast relatives. The dowager duchess and her children returned to Wolgast Castle. After announcing a planned kidnapping by the Baron of Schwerin, resident in Spantekow and Altwigshagen, the oldest son, Bogislaw, was again taken to Greifswald for safety.

In July 1327, fighting broke out again. After an unsuccessful attack on Demmin, Henry II of Mecklenburg advanced to the gates of Greifswald on 16 August 1327. Since they could do nothing against the defences at Greifswald, the Mecklenburg forces marched to the area of Wusterhusen and devastated the settlements around Wolgast. The following day, the Mecklenburg army advanced to Loitz and built a fortified position on the Schopendamm, called the Schopenburg. Because no help was forthcoming from the Danes under Gerhard of Holstein, the Pomeranian towns turned to the Stettin dukes for assistance. In early October, the Mecklenburg troops marched on Grimmen and Ekberg Castle in the vicinity of Greifswald and stole 40 cows. They were pursued by 600 townsfolk from Greifswald and heavily armed horsemen. The Mecklenburg army was totally routed at Griebenow. Subsequent military action by the Pomeranians met with limited or no success; an example of the latter being the siege of the Schopenburg near Loitz in March 1328.

In April 1328, Henry turned against the Duchy of Pomerania-Stettin and headed for Treptow an der Tollense. The Pomeranian troops were obliged to fight the Brandenburg forces. So the counts of Gützkow, supported by troops from Demmin and Treptow fought Henry II and beat him decisively at Völschow.

== Treaty of Brudersdorf ==
On 27 June 1328, in the village of Brudersdorf near Dargun, a peace treaty was signed between Duke Barnim III of Stettin, guardian of Vartislav IV's sons, Henry II of Mecklenburg, and John of Werle. In return for 31,000 silver marks of Cologne weight, to be paid over the following twelve years, Mecklenburg renounced its claim on the Principality of Rügen. As a pledge they received the western part of Rügen's mainland territories, the regions of Barth, Grimmen and Tribsees.

== Second War of the Rügen Succession ==
In December 1340, the payment of the pledge was due. Since this did not happen, the pledged lands fell to Mecklenburg. However, no investiture of the Prince of Mecklenburg was made by the Danish king Valdemar IV Atterdag. In autumn 1342, the Pomeranian Marshal, Wedego Bugenhagen, gained control of Grimmen. In September 1343, the Mecklenburg army under Albert II succeeded in storming the town. Thanks to mediation by the towns of Stralsund and Greifswald, a ceasefire was agreed in October 1343. But the agreed arbitration never took place. Valdemar IV Atterdag, the former feudal lord, avoided making a decision, fearing that the losing party would desert him.

Because the sons of Vartislav IV of Pomerania-Wolgast could not redeem the pledged estates, but continued to claim them back, there was renewed fighting with Mecklenburg in 1351. With the support of Barnim III of Pomerania-Stettin, an army led by Baron Klaus Hahn inflicted a devastating defeat on Mecklenburg on 25 October 1351 at the Schopendamm near Loitz. Amongst the fallen on the Pomeranian side, was Count John IV the Younger of Gützkow. As the Gützkow count had no male offspring, the county of Gützkow was later seized by Barnim III.

== Treaty of Stralsund ==
In 1354, Mecklenburg relinquished its claims on Grimmen and Barth in the Treaty of Stralsund. Tribsees went to Pomerania in 1355, since it belonged to the jointure of Vitslav III's widow, Anne of Lindow-Ruppin, who had married Henry II. With that, the whole of the former Principality of Rügen was united with the Duchy of Pomerania-Wolgast.

== Literature ==
- Horst-Diether Schroeder: Der Erste Rügische Erbfolgekrieg – Ursachen, Verlauf und Ergebnisse. In: Beiträge zur Geschichte Vorpommerns: die Demminer Kolloquien 1985–1994. Thomas Helms Verlag, Schwerin, 1997, ISBN 3-931185-11-7.
- Werner Strecker: Die äußere Politik Albrechts II. von Mecklenburg. In: Verein für Mecklenburgische Geschichte und Altertumskunde: Jahrbücher des Vereins für Mecklenburgische Geschichte und Altertumskunde. - Vol. 78 (Schwerin 1913), pp. 1–300
- Ingeborg Lohfink: Vorpommern – Begegnung mit dem Land am Meer. Hinstorff Verlag, Rostock, 1991, ISBN 3-356-00418-2.
