= Jaromar II of Rügen =

Jaromar II, Prince of Rügen
- Born: c. 1218
- Died: 20 August 1260
- Noble family: Vitslav
- Spouse: Euphemia of Pomerania
- Father: Vitslav I, Prince of Rügen
- Mother: Margaret

Jaromar II, Prince of Rügen (c. 1218 – 20 August 1260) was a Slavic nobleman. He was the ruling Prince of Rügen from 1249 until his death.

== Life ==
He was first mentioned on 8 November 1231. From 28 September 1246, he was co-ruler with his father, Prince Vitslav I. During the early years of his reign, he tried to maintain peaceful relations with his neighbours, the Dukes of Pomerania, especially with the princes of Gützkow, who were vassals of Barnim I. He promoted trade by outlawing wrecking and providing safe passage for merchant ships from Lübeck. In 1249, troops from Lübeck destroyed the city of Stralsund; this resulted in a war which lasted four years, during which Stralsund's privateers were allowed to capture ships from Lübeck. All privileges granted to Lübeck were suspended until they paid compensation for the damage done to Stralsund.

Jaromar II donated land to the three Cistercian monasteries in his territory, in Bergen auf Rügen, Neuenkamp, and Hilda. In 1252, he donated the Radevice Land in Mönchgut to Hilda Abbey, near Greifswald. He supported the settlement of other religious orders in his territory. The Dominicans founded the St. Catherine monastery in Stralsund; the Franciscans founded the St. John monastery, also in Stralsund, in 1254. In 1255, he granted Lübeck style city rights to Barth and in 1258 to Damgarten.

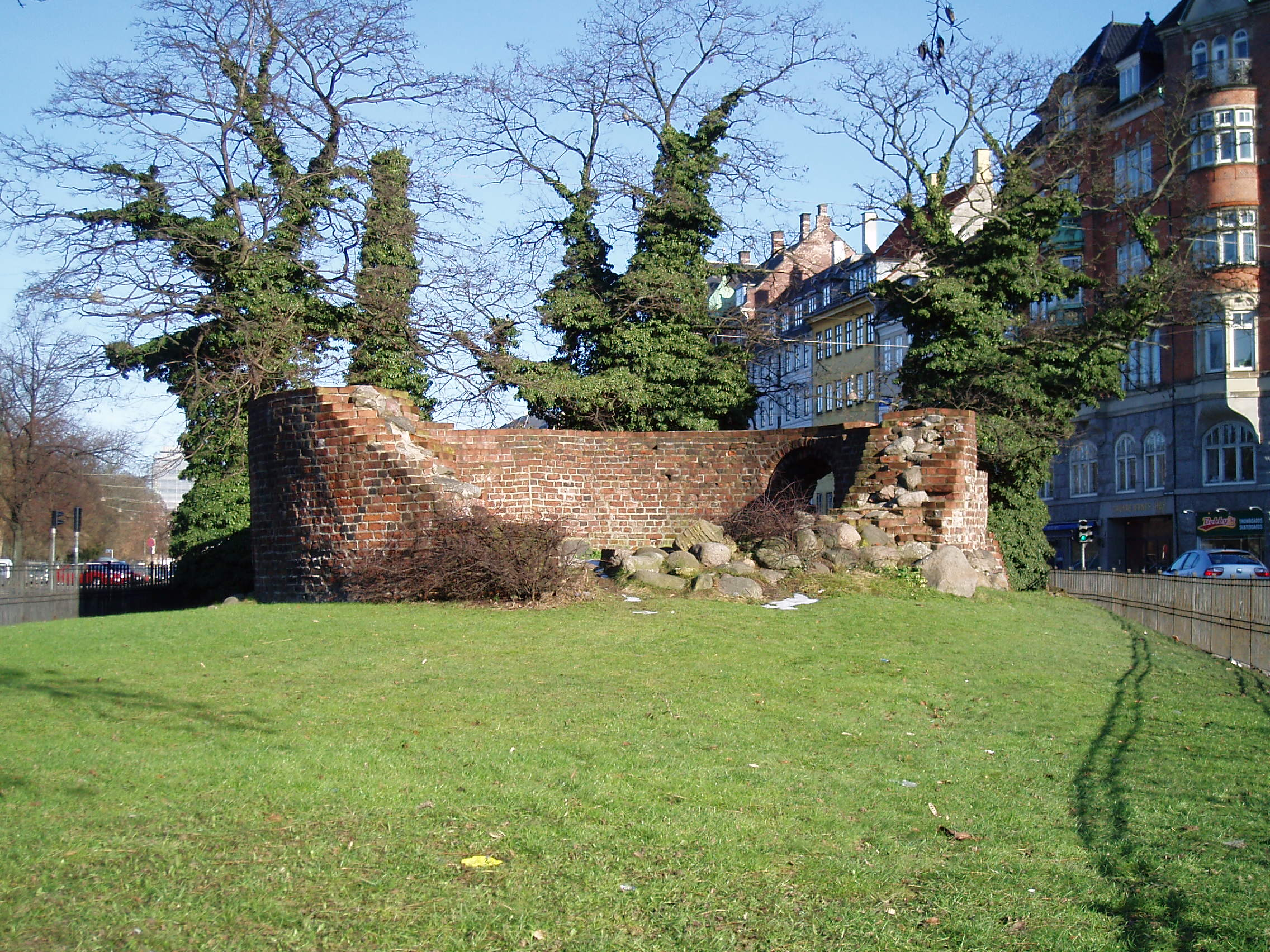
Jarmers Tower in Copenhagen

Jaromar II was an ardent supporter of the archbishops in the Danish domestic struggle between the Danish king and the archbishops Jakob Erlandsen of Lund and Peder Bang of Roskilde. In 1259 Peder Bang escaped from a Danish prison, into exile in Schaprode in Rügen. In April of the same year, Jaromar II and Peder Bang landed on the main Danish island of Zealand and took the city of Copenhagen. They burned down a large part of Copenhagen, after looting the city. King Christopher I of Denmark suddenly died in Ribe in May 1259. His widow, Margaret Sambiria, took up the regency for her underage son Eric V. She raised a peasant army, which was defeated by Jaromar II at Næstved. After devastating Zealand, Scania and Lolland, he landed with his army on Bornholm, where he destroyed the royal fortress at Lilleborg. A woman seeking revenge stabbed him with a dagger on Bornholm, or in Skane in 1260. It is unknown where he was buried; perhaps in Bergen auf Rügen Abbey or in Neuenkamp Abbey in Franzburg.

The Jarmers Tower on Jarmers Plads ("Jaromar Place") in Copenhagen is a reminder of the devastation Jaromar II brought to the city.

== Marriage and issue ==
Jaromar II married Euphemia, a daughter of Swietopelk II, Duke of Pomerania. Together, they had three children:

- Vitslav II (1240-1302), his successor
- Margaret (c. 1247 – 1272), married Duke Eric I of Schleswig
- Jaromar III (before 1249 – 1282), co-ruler with Vitslav II

== Footnotes ==
Jaromar II of Rügen House of Vitslav Born: c. 1218 Died: 20 August 1260
Preceded by Vitslav I	Prince of Rügen; 1249-1260	Succeeded by Vitslav II
