= Vitslav III of Rügen =

Vitslav III
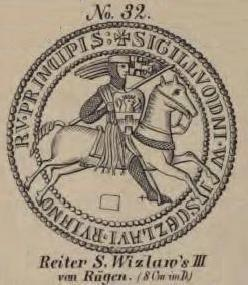

Prince of Rügen
- Reign: 1303 – 1325
- Predecessor: Vitslav II
- Successor: Wartislaw IV
- Born: 1265
- Died: 1325 (aged 59–60)
Names
- German: Wizlaw III von Rügen
- House: House of Wizlaw
- Father: Vitslav II, Prince of Rügen
- Mother: Agnes of Brunswick-Lüneburg

Vitslav III (1265/8–1325), variously called Vislav, Vizlav, Wislaw, Wizlaw and Witslaw in English sources, was the last Slavic ruler of the Danish Principality of Rugia. He is often identified with the author of the Minnesinger Vitslav of the Jenaer Liederhandschrift.

He was the son and successor of Vitslav II, and as such one of the Wizlawids descended from Kruto of Wagria. Born in either 1263 or 1268, he is attested in a document of 1283. At his father's death in 1302, Vitslav shared the throne of Rügen with his brother Sambor. There was rivalry between the two brothers, but Sambor died in 1304, and Wizlaw ruled alone until his death in 1325. Vitslav had two daughters, Euphemia and Agnes (wife of Albert II, Prince of Anhalt-Zerbst), and a son, Jaromar. But Jaromar died in May 1325, shortly before his father, and Vitslav faced the prospect of leaving no male heir.

Rügen would have fallen to Vitslav's nephew, Wartislaw IV, but Wartislav died in 1326, causing the Rügen war of succession.

The Minnesinger Vitslav was likely in fact Vitslav III. Fourteen songs and thirteen poems by this author have been preserved as an addition to the Jenaer Liederhandschrift (foll. 72vb - 80vb).

== Literature ==
- Friedrich Heinrich von der Hagen: Minnesinger, Deutsche Liederdichter des 12., 13. und 14. Jahrhunderts I - IV. Leipzig 1838, Nachdruck Aalen 1963 (Wizlaws Texte: S. 78–85, Band I, Wizlaws Melodien: S. 808–817, Band IV)
- C. G. Fabricius: Urkunden zur Geschichte des Fürstentums Rügen unter den eingeborenen Fürsten., Stettin 1851
- Ludwig Ettmüller: Des Fürsten von Rügen Wizlaws des Vierten Sprüche und Lieder in niederdeutscher Sprache. (Bibliothek der gesamten deutschen National-Literatur, 33. Band), Quedlinburg und Leipzig 1852, Neuausgabe durch Edition Rodopi, Amsterdam 1969
- Theodor Pyl: Lieder und Sprüche des Fürsten Wizlaw von Rügen. Greifswald 1872
- Franz Kuntze: Wizlaw III – Der letzte Fürst von Rügen. Halle a. S. 1893
- Theodor Pyl (1898). "Wizlaw III." . Allgemeine Deutsche Biographie (in German). Vol. 43. Leipzig: Duncker & Humblot. pp. 684–688.
- Georg Holz, Franz Saran, Eduard Bernoulli (eds.): Die Jenaer Liederhandschrift. Teil I. Getreuer Abdruck des Textes, hg. von Georg Holz, Teil II. Übertragung, Rhythmik und Melodik, bearb. von Eduard Bernoulli und Franz Saran, Leipzig 1901, Nachdruck Hildesheim 1966
- Erich Gülzow: Des Fürsten Wizlaw von Rügen Minnelieder und Sprüche. Greifswald 1922
- Ursula Scheil: Genealogie der Fürsten von Rügen (1164 - 1325). Greifswald 1945
- Wesley Thomas, Barbara Garvey Seagrave: The Songs Of The Minnesinger, Prince Wizlaw Of Rügen. Chapel Hill, The University of North Carolina 1967
- Sabine Werg: Die Sprüche und Lieder Wizlavs von Rügen. Untersuchungen und kritische Ausgabe der Gedichte. Hamburg 1969
- Birgit Spitschuh: Wizlaw von Rügen: eine Monographie. Greifswald 1989
- Burghart Wachinger: Wizlav. In: Verfasserlexikon 10/1999, S. 1292–1298
- Reinhard Bleck: Untersuchungen zur sogenannten Spruchdichtung und zur Sprache des Fürsten Wizlaw III. von Rügen. In: Göppinger Arbeiten zur Germanistik. 681/2000, Kümmerle Verlag
- Lothar Jahn: Nach der sehnenden Klage muss ich singen - Schlaglichter auf die Musik des Minnesängers Wizlaw: In: Karfunkel Musica. 1/2005, Wald-Michelbach, S. 44–49
- Meinolf Schumacher: Schreib dies, Wizlav! Die Sprüche und Lieder von Wizlav, dem jungen. = Write this, Wizlav! The sayings and songs of Wizlav, the young. In: Mare Balticum. Volume 3: Wizlav von Rügen, Sämtliche Lieder und Sprüche. [Booklet]. Ensemble Peregrina. SACD Tacet, Stuttgart 2020 (PDF)
- Horst Brunner, Dorothea Klein (eds.): Wizlav – Sangsprüche und Minnelieder. Reichert Verlag, Wiesbaden 2021

Vitslav III of Rügen House of Vitslav Born: c. 1265 Died: 1325
| Preceded by Vitslav II | Prince of Rügen; 1304–1325 | Succeeded by Wartislaw IV |
