= Jaromar III =

Jaromar III (died 1282) was the younger son of Prince Jaromar II of Rügen and his wife Euphemia. He served as regent of the Principality of Rügen during the many absences of his older brother, Vitslav II. In 1268, he issued a charter as prince to Neuenkamp Abbey.

Jaromar acted as regent when his brother went on a crusade to Livonia in 1282. In this capacity, he issued a privilege of confirmation to Eldena Abbey on 6 July 1282. Vitslav intended to carve out a principality for his brother in the east to serve as a bulwark against the Teutonic Order, but Jaromar died later that year before the plan came to fruition.
