= Berno, Apostle of the Obotrites =

Berno, Bishop of Schwerin, also known as the Apostle of the Obotrites or Berno of Amelungsborn (died 14 January 1191) was a pre-eminent missionary to the Obotrites in the territory of Mecklenburg, Germany, and the first Bishop of Schwerin.

== Life ==
Berno was a Cistercian monk in Amelungsborn Abbey near Stadtoldendorf in the Weserbergland. In 1155 he began his mission to the territory of the Obotrites around Mecklenburg. Henry the Lion appointed him Bishop of Mecklenburg, after the failure of a previously planned mission by Bishop Emmehard (d. 1155), reporting to Hartwig von Stade, Archbishop of Bremen.

At the beginning of his evangelisation of the Obotrites they still adhered to the Wendish rites, and progress was slow and difficult. The inhabitants resisted conversion to the Christian faith, sometimes violently. In 1160, because of the constant danger from hostile groups, Berno moved the bishop's seat from Mecklenburg Castle to Schwerin. In the same year, with the consent of Henry the Lion, Archbishop Hartwig von Stade of Bremen subordinated the Bishopric of Schwerin to the authority of the Archbishop of Hamburg. From Schwerin Berno preached "...more powerfully the light of faith to the people who sat in darkness"

Henry the Lion had founded the town of Schwerin on the site of a Wendish settlement. The Statthalter and later the first Count of Schwerin, Gunzelin von Hagen, provided the necessary security, and Christian groups formed among the townspeople. Berno had other clerics with him by no later than 1164. He himself travelled throughout the country in order to advance the process of Christianity by founding churches, baptising and preaching, as far as Demmin.

Pribislav, prince of the Obotrites, after his defeat by Henry the Lion, had himself baptised, in order to make possible the survival of his dynasty. From then on, despite occasional outbreaks of revolt, the evangelisation of the country proceeded peacefully, so much so that by 1166 it was possible to extend the bishopric to the mouth of the Peene. The last significant cult centre of the Obotrites and all other remaining pagan Wends south of the Ostsee or Baltic Sea was located in the ancestral territory of the Rani on Rügen. For this reason in 1168 Berno took part with Pribislav, who as a vassal of Henry the Lion was obligated to do it, on an expedition for the destruction of the pagan cult sites under the leadership of Valdemar I of Denmark. The expedition ended with the submission of the Rügen princess to Danish feudal overlordship and the mass baptism of the people of Rügen. The area on the mainland north of the Ryck that formed part of this territory was put under Berno's diocese.

On 9 September 1171 Berno dedicated Schwerin Cathedral, a predecessor of the present building. He had great success in the foundation of monasteries, in which the Cistercians were of particular assistance: they founded Doberan Abbey in 1171, and in 1172 Dargun Abbey. On 30 November 1173 Berno dedicated the first altar in the chapel at Dargun and confirmed to the new monastery gifts from Pribislav and from Casimir I, Duke of Pomerania.

On 1 February 1177 Berno held a general synod in Schwerin. At the beginning of 1178 he travelled to Rome, where in March Pope Alexander III confirmed him in his bishopric. He travelled to Rome again at the end of 1178 to attend the papal council of 5–18 March 1179. While he was on this journey, Pribislav, Prince of Mecklenburg, died, on 30 December 1178 in Lüneburg, in the train of which much serious disturbance ensued: on 10 November 1179 Doberan Abbey was sacked and all the inhabitants killed; Dargun Abbey was abandoned by its monks.

For his protection and security Berno attended the court at Erfurt in November 1181, and on 2 December 1181 received the Emperor's confirmation of his ecclesiastical property. He also attended the court at Altenburg in 1183 to secure his position further. It took some time for the situation in Mecklenburg to calm down, although Christianity was already widespread, and in the new prince, Heinrich Borwin I, who had been ruling since 1181, had an energetic spokesman. Eventually, in 1186, it was possible to take in hand the reconstruction – on another site – of Doberan Abbey.

Berno died in Schwerin on 14 January 1191.

== External links / Sources ==
- "Berno". Catholic Encyclopedia.
- Literature about Berno, Apostle of the Obotrites in the State Bibliography (Landesbibliographie) of Mecklenburg-Vorpommern
- "Berno, Apostle of the Obotrites". Biographisch-Bibliographisches Kirchenlexikon (BBKL) (in German).
- "Berno, Apostle of the Obotrites". Allgemeine Deutsche Biographie (in German). Vol. 2. Leipzig: Duncker & Humblot. 1875. p. 467.

Berno of Amelungsborn Died: 14 January 1191
Catholic Church titles
| Vacant Title last held by Emmehard also Eberhard, as Bishop of Mecklenburg | Bishop of Schwerin; 1162–1181 | Elevation to Prince-Bishop |
Regnal titles
Catholic Church titles
| Gained princely power in part of the diocese | Prince-Bishop of Schwerin; 1181–1191 | Succeeded by Brunward |
