= Jaromar (bishop) =

13th-century Pomeranian Catholic bishop

Jaromar of Rügen (c. 1267 – c. 1294) was a member of the Rügen princely house and a Roman Catholic priest. At the end of the 13th century he was selected as Bishop of Cammin in Pomerania.

== Life ==
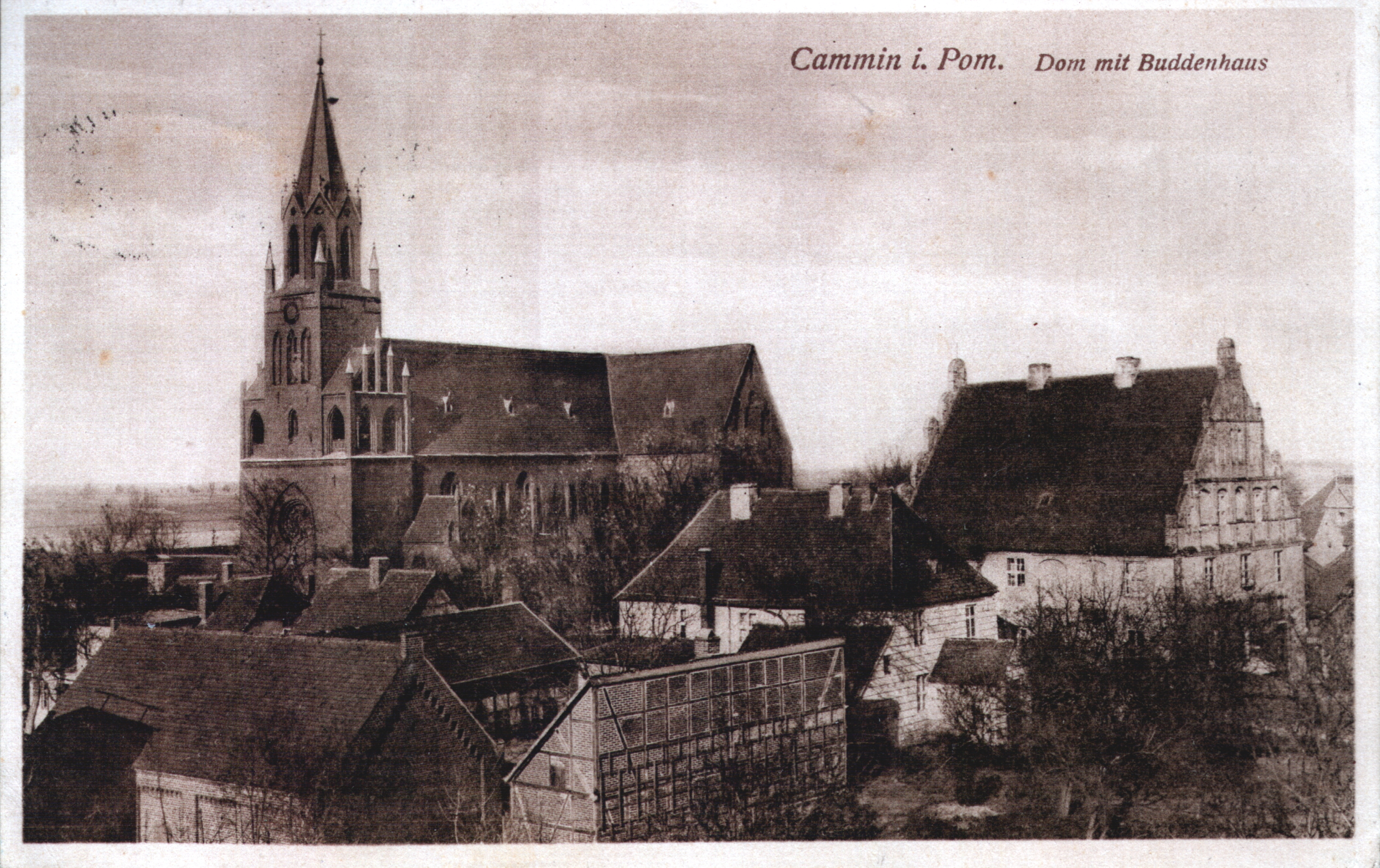
The Cathedral of Cammin, where Jaromar's body rests

Jaromar was born around 1267 as a son of Prince Vitslav II of Rügen. He was first mentioned in the records on 15 April 1280 as a scholaris. Later he was recorded as the archdeacon at St Nicholas's Church in Stralsund.

After Bishop Hermann of Gleichen, who died in early 1289, had strengthened the independence of the Bishopric of Cammin by political means, the Pomeranian dukes sought to bind the bishopric ever more tightly to themselves. Under their influence Jaromar, whose sister was Margaret, wife of Duke Bogislav IV, was elected as Hermann's successor in 1289 by the cathedral chapter of Cammin. In a bull by Pope Nicholas IV of 7 October 1289 he was confirmed as the chosen bishop. In spite of his close ties to the Pomeranian princes, Jaromar had the estates of the bishopric confirmed by the Margrave of Brandenburg.

Jaromar died around 1294 before he could be consecrated and was laid to rest in Cammin Cathedral. The man elected as his successor by the chapter, cathedral curator (Domkustos) Vitslav, was not confirmed by the Pope.

== Sources ==
- Theodor Pyl (1898). "Jaromar in the article by his father, Vitslav II" . Allgemeine Deutsche Biographie (in German). Vol. 43. Leipzig: Duncker & Humblot. pp. 681–684.
- Martin Wehrmann: Geschichte von Pommern. Vol. 1, Weltbild Verlag 1992, reprint of the editions of 1919 and 1921, ISBN 3-89350-112-6, p. 122ff.

Preceded by Hermann von Gleichen	Bishop of Cammin; 1289-1294	Succeeded by Petrus
