= Vitslav I of Rügen =

Prince of Rügen (c. 1180 – 1250)

Vitslav I
- Prince of Rügen
- Reign: 1221–1250
- Prince: Barnuta
- Prince: Jaromar II
- Born: Vitslav I c. 1180
- Died: 7 June 1250
- Wife: Margarete
- Children: Jaroslav; Petrus; Vitslav; Burislav; Nikolaus; Jaromar II
- Dynasty: House of Wizlaw
- Father: Jaromar I
- Mother: Hildegard of Denmark

Vitslav I (c. 1180 – 7 June 1250), variously called Vislav, Vizlav, Wislaw, Wizlaw and Witslaw in English sources, was a prince of Rügen.

== Life ==
The first surviving mention of Vitslav I dates to 1193. His parents were Jaromar I and Hildegard of Denmark (ca. 1135), the daughter of Canute V of Denmark (ca. 1128–1157) and (Sophie?) Sverkersdotter of Sweden.

In 1219, Vitslav took part in a campaign by his feudal lord, the King of Denmark Valdemar II, to Estonia. Following the resignation of his brother, Barnuta, Vitslav I was mentioned in documents in 1221 as the Prince of Rügen. This year is also first time that there is a record of German settlers in the mainland territories of Rügen. In subsequent years, he again took part in wars on the side of Valdemar II, for example, in 1225 at the Battle of Mölln and in 1227 at the Battle of Bornhöved. Despite the defeat of the Danes, he held firmly to his feudal relation with Denmark. In 1231 he founded the Cistercian monastery of Neuenkamp (now Franzburg). In 1234, he gave Stralsund its town rights and granted the town privileges such as fishing rights and exemption from duty. During his reign, the Principality of Rügen reached its greatest extent.

== Descendants ==
With his wife Margarete (before 1200 - 5 March 1232), probably a niece of bishop Absalon and possibly a daughter of Sverker II of Sweden and Benedicta Ebbesdotter of Hvide, he had six sons whose names are known:

- Jaroslav (* after 1215 – † 1242/1243), from 1232 to 1242 Propst of Rügen and Tribsees
- Petrus (* after 1215 – † 1237)
- Vitslav (* ca. 1220 – † 1243/44)
- Burislav (* before 1231 – † 1237)
- Nikolaus (* before 1231 – † 1237)
- Jaromar II (* 1218 – † 1260), his successor (from 1245 co-ruler)

== Bibliography ==
- Gunnar Möller: Geschichte und Besiedlung der Terra Gristow vom 7. bis 14. Jahrhundert. In: Beiträge zur Geschichte Vorpommerns: die Demminer Kolloquien 1985–1994. Thomas Helms Verlag, Schwerin 1997, ISBN 3-931185-11-7.
- Joachim Wächter: Das Fürstentum Rügen - Ein Überblick. In: Beiträge zur Geschichte Vorpommerns: die Demminer Kolloquien 1985–1994. Thomas Helms Verlag, Schwerin 1997, ISBN 3-931185-11-7.
