= Eldena Abbey =

Former Cistercian monastery in Mecklenburg-Vorpommern, Germany

Coordinates: 54°05′21″N 13°27′08″E

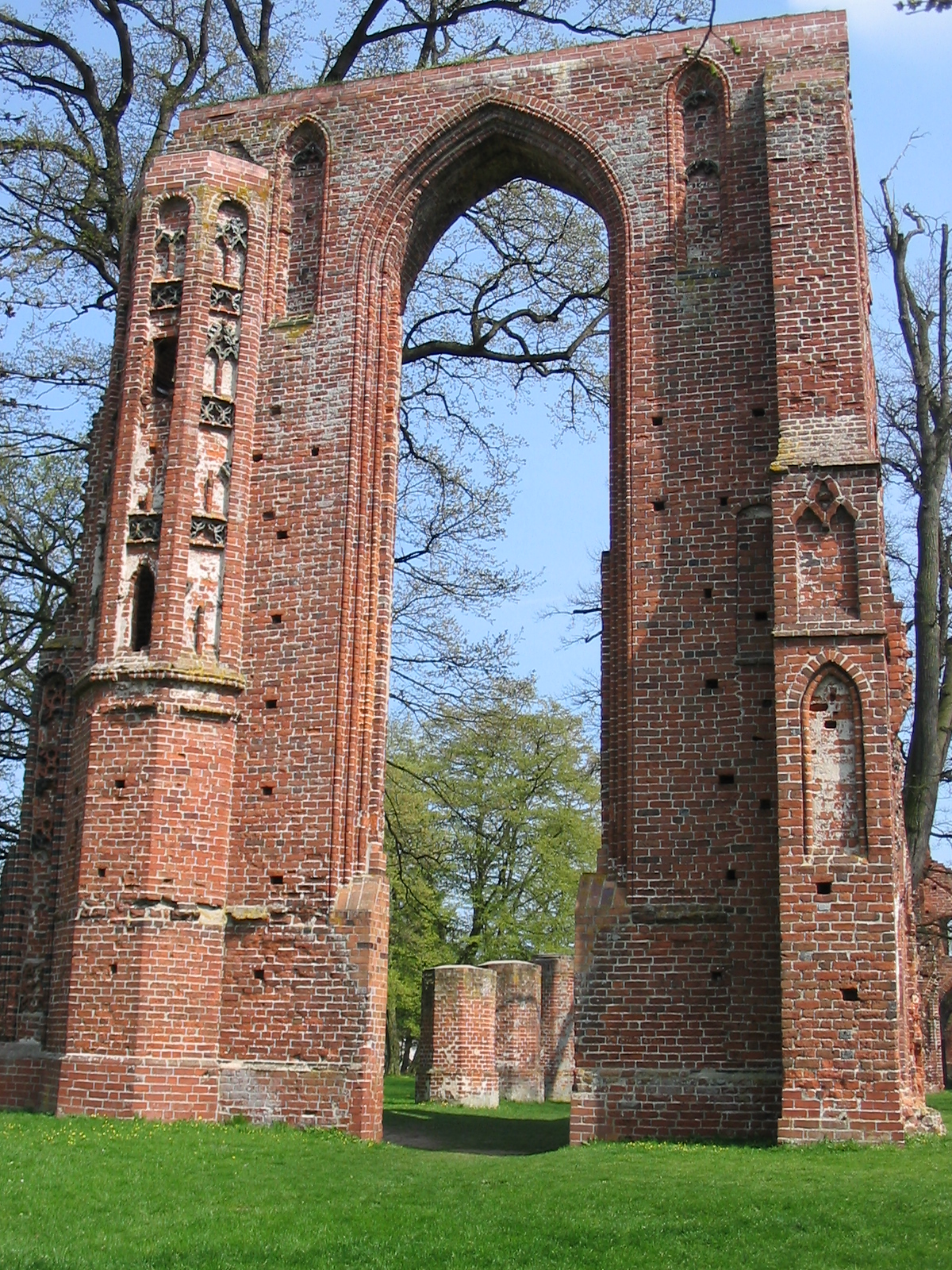
Ruins of Eldena Abbey in spring

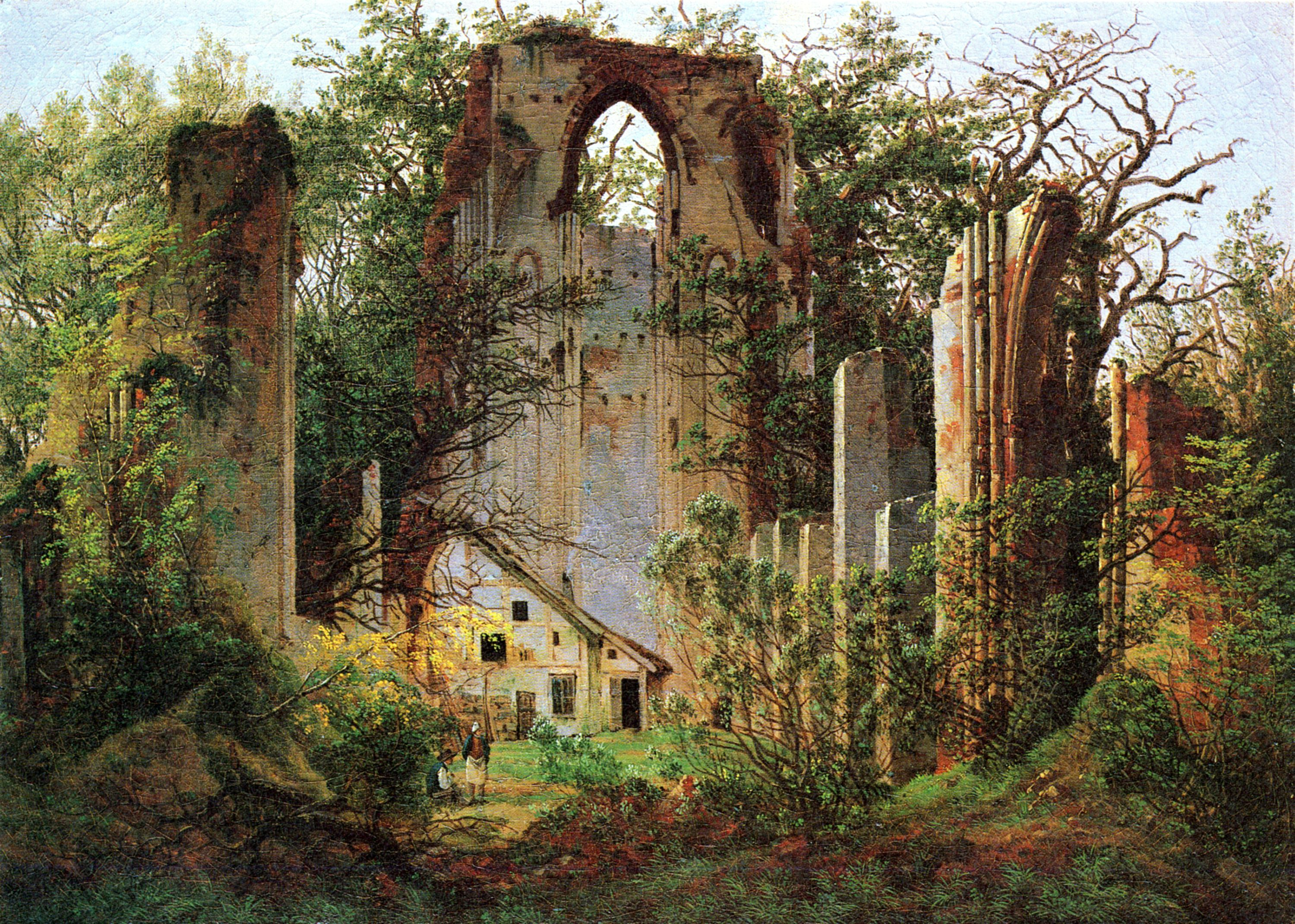
Ruine Eldena by Caspar David Friedrich (1825)

Eldena Abbey (German: Kloster Eldena), originally Hilda Abbey (German: Kloster Hilda) is a former Cistercian monastery near the present town of Greifswald in Mecklenburg-Vorpommern, Germany. Only ruins survive, which are well known as a frequent subject of Caspar David Friedrich's paintings, including the famous Abtei im Eichwald ("Abbey in the Oak Forest").

== History ==
=== Monastery ===
In the 12th century the Baltic coast south of the island of Rügen belonged to the Rani principality of Rügen, which in its turn was subject to the Danes. The Danish Cistercian monastery, Esrum Abbey, was thus able to found a daughter house in the area, Dargun Abbey, at Dargun, west of Demmin, in 1172. When in 1198 this monastery was destroyed in fighting between Denmark and Brandenburg, Jaromar I, Prince of the Rani, whose wife was of the Danish royal house, offered to re-settle the monks at a new site at the mouth of the River Ryck, close to the boundary between the territory of the Princes of Rügen, and the County of Gützkow, since the early 1120s subordinate to the Duchy of Pomerania.

The offer of the site, which included profitable salt pans, was accepted, and in 1199 Hilda Abbey, now Eldena Abbey, was founded, and confirmed by Pope Innocent III in 1204. The princes of Rügen further endowed the new monastery with extensive lands in the border country between the Rügen-owned territories of Gristow and Wostrose (Wusterhusen), the area of Lositz (Loitz) which was debated between Rügen and Mecklenburg, and the County of Gützkow.

The monastery became wealthy from the salt trade and was very influential in the Christianisation of Western Pomerania. It also brought about the foundation at the beginning of the 13th century of the town of Greifswald, which started out as the monastery's trading settlement opposite the salt pans, near the point where the via regia, an important trade route, crossed the river. After the Battle of Bornhöved in 1227 the Danes withdrew from this part of their former territories, and despite some competition from the princes of Rügen, the Duke of Pomerania, Wartislaw III, was able in 1248/49 to press the abbey into subinfeudating Greifswald to him. Wartislaw was later buried in Eldena Abbey, as were later members of the ducal family, the House of Pomerania.

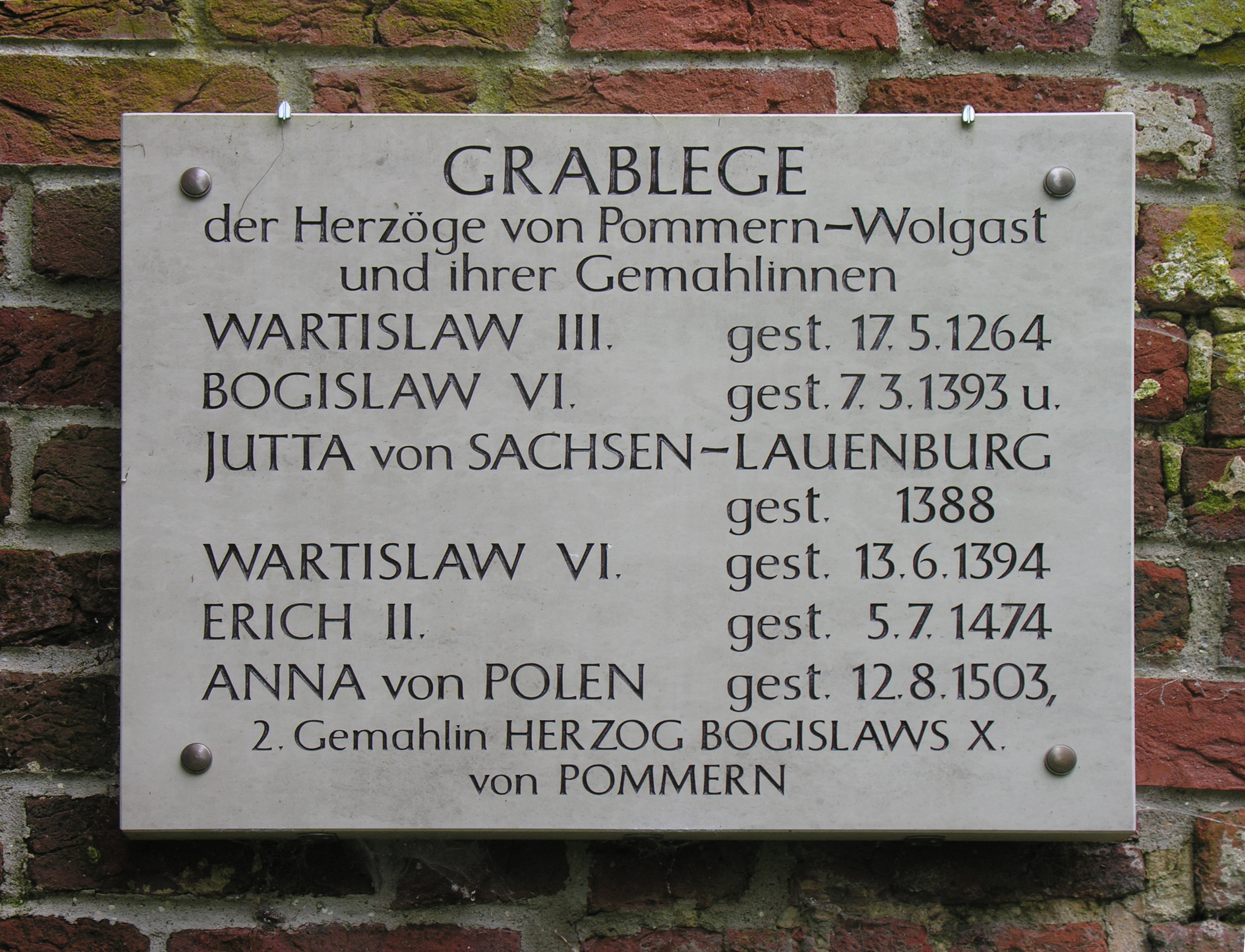
Memorial plaque recording the burials at Eldena Abbey of Wartislaw III and later members of the ducal family

Throughout the 13th century, Eldena Abbey organized the cultivation and settlement of its growing estates in the Ostsiedlung process, allocating and founding Wendish, Danish and German villages. In the growing town of Greifswald however, the Cistercians of Eldena lost much of their influence after the mid-13th century foundation there of friaries of the Franciscans (Greyfriars) and the Dominicans (Blackfriars).

The east end of the abbey church was built in about 1200, while the conventual buildings date from the mid-13th and 14th centuries, all in Brick Gothic. The final stages of construction were the west front and the nave of the church, which were completed in the 15th century.

=== Dissolution and later history ===
The abbey was dissolved in 1535, when the Reformation was introduced into Pomerania by Duke Philip I, who took over its estates. The buildings were severely damaged during the Thirty Years' War. In 1634 the site was given to the University of Greifswald. The buildings fell derelict during the Swedish occupation of western Pomerania (1648–1815), and bricks were taken away to build fortifications.

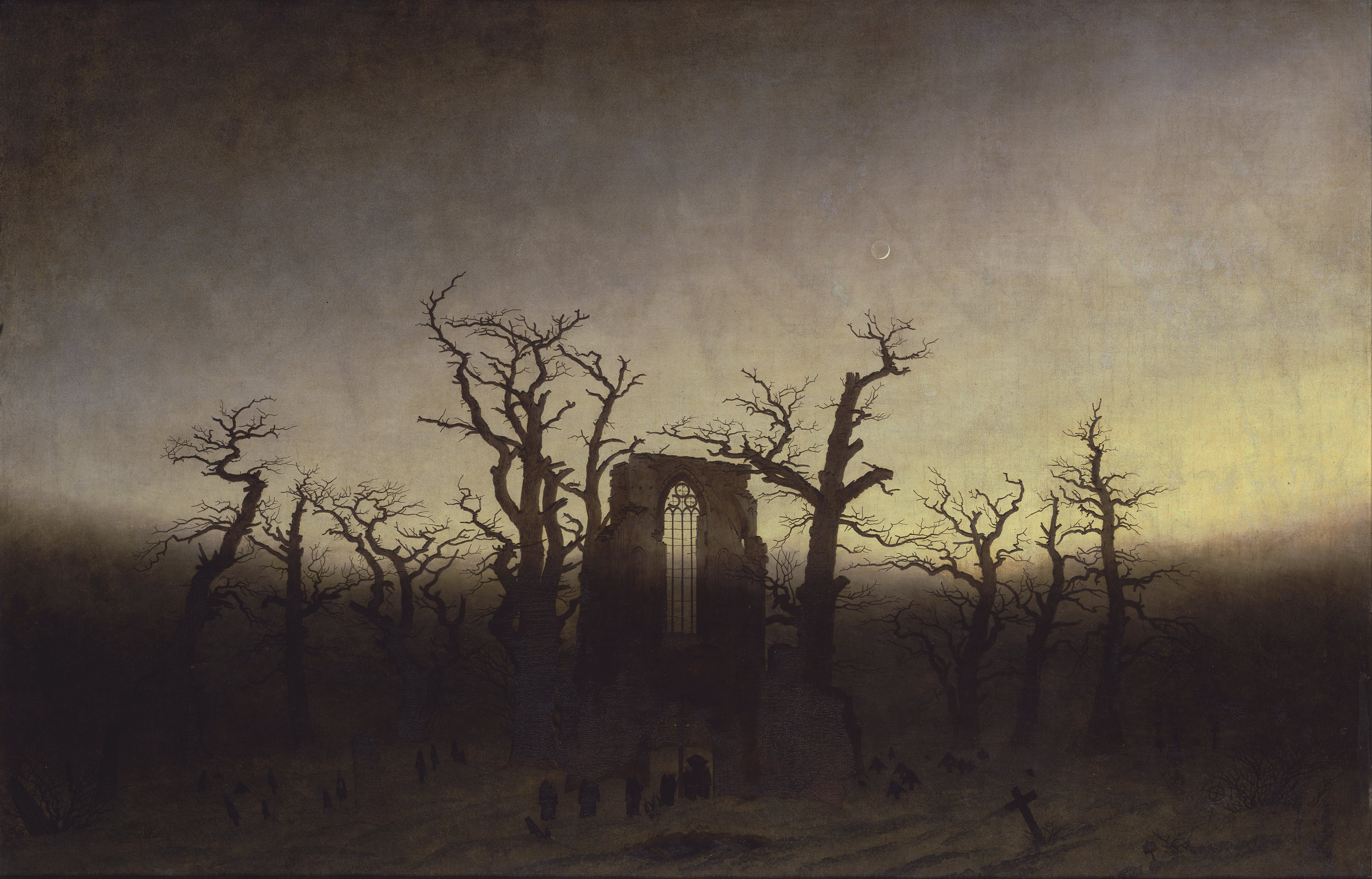
Caspar David Friedrich: Abtei im Eichwald (1809-10), based on the ruins of Eldena Abbey

By the beginning of the 19th century, when the Romantic painter Caspar David Friedrich knew the abbey, it was a ruin, which he made the subject of several paintings. Renewed public interest led to the beginning of restoration work in 1828, and on the basis of designs by the Prussian landscape gardener Peter Joseph Lenné a park was laid out on the abbey precinct.

In 1926-1927, scientific excavations were carried out in order to reconstruct the exact layout of the site. In the 1960s further work was carried out to make the site suitable for use for public and cultural events. Still more works were authorised from 1996 onwards jointly by both the State Office for the Preservation of Historical Monuments (Landesamt für Denkmalpflege) and the town of Greifswald, which eventually led to the declaration of the ruins as a cultural site of the Pomerania Euroregion.

== List of abbots ==
- Liwinius 1193–1207
- Sueno I 1207–1215
- Johannes I 1234–1241
- Andreas 1241
- Sueno II 1249–1254
- Christian 1256
- Reginarus 1265
- Rudolf 1270–1274
- Johannes II 1275–1290
- Hermann I 1293
- Nikolaus I Witte 1294–1295
- Heinrich I 1297–1303
- Jakob Stumpel 1304–1306
- Heinrich II 1306–1309
- Robert 1319
- Johannes III of Hagen c. 1325
- Arnold of Lübeck c. 1329
- Gerhard I 1335
- Heinrich III 1337
- Gerhard II 1341
- Martin 1347–1367
- Johannes IV Rotermund 1369
- Johannes V 1369–1388
- Johannes VI 1392–1415
- Nikolaus II 1415–1434
- Hartwich 1436–1447
- Everhard 1448–1452
- Sabellus Crugher 1455–1456
- Theodorich 1458
- Hermann II 1459–1470
- Johannes VII 1470–1473
- Nikolaus III 1473-1486
- Gregorius Groper 1486–1490
- Lambert von Werle 1490–1499
- Matthias 1499–1510
- Enwaldus Schinkel 1510–1535
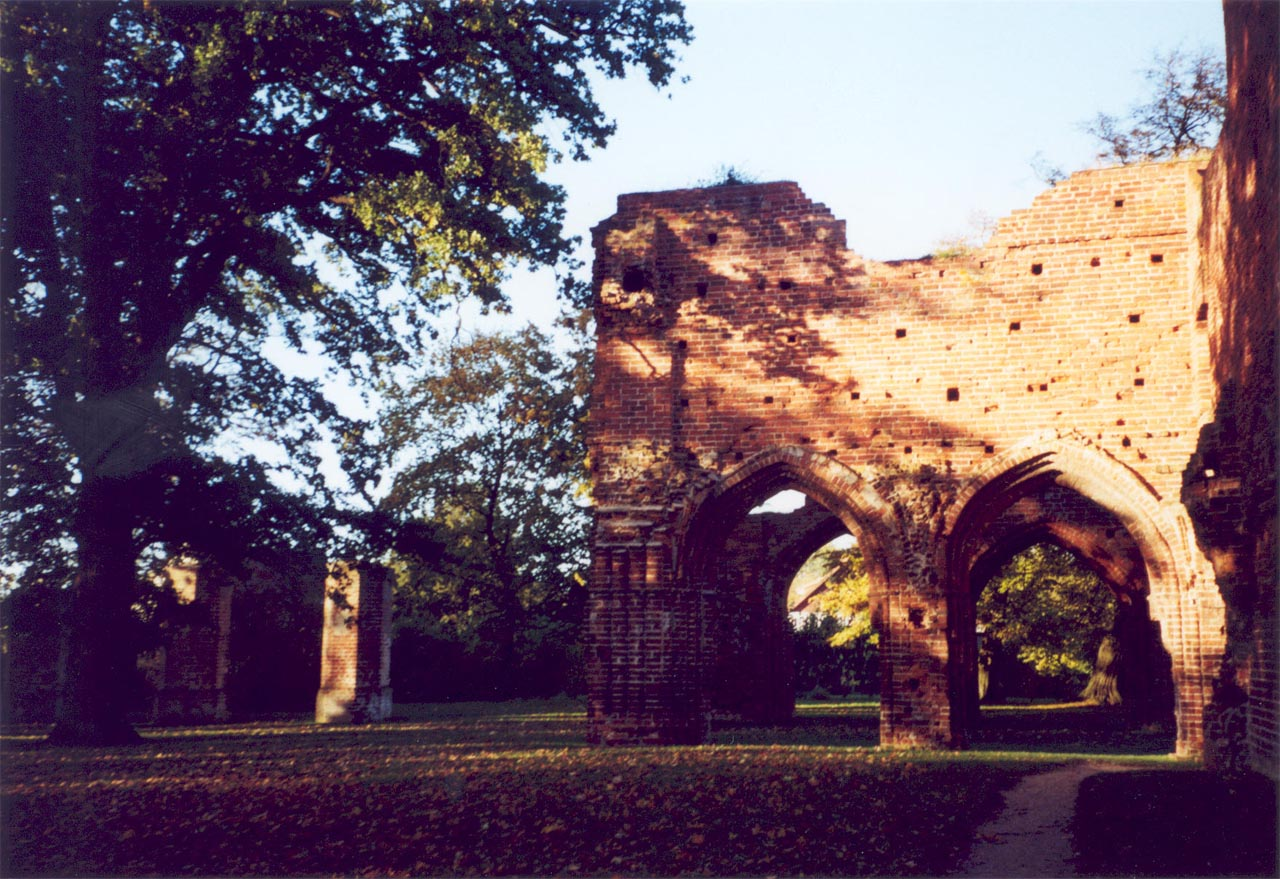
Eldena Abbey ruins...

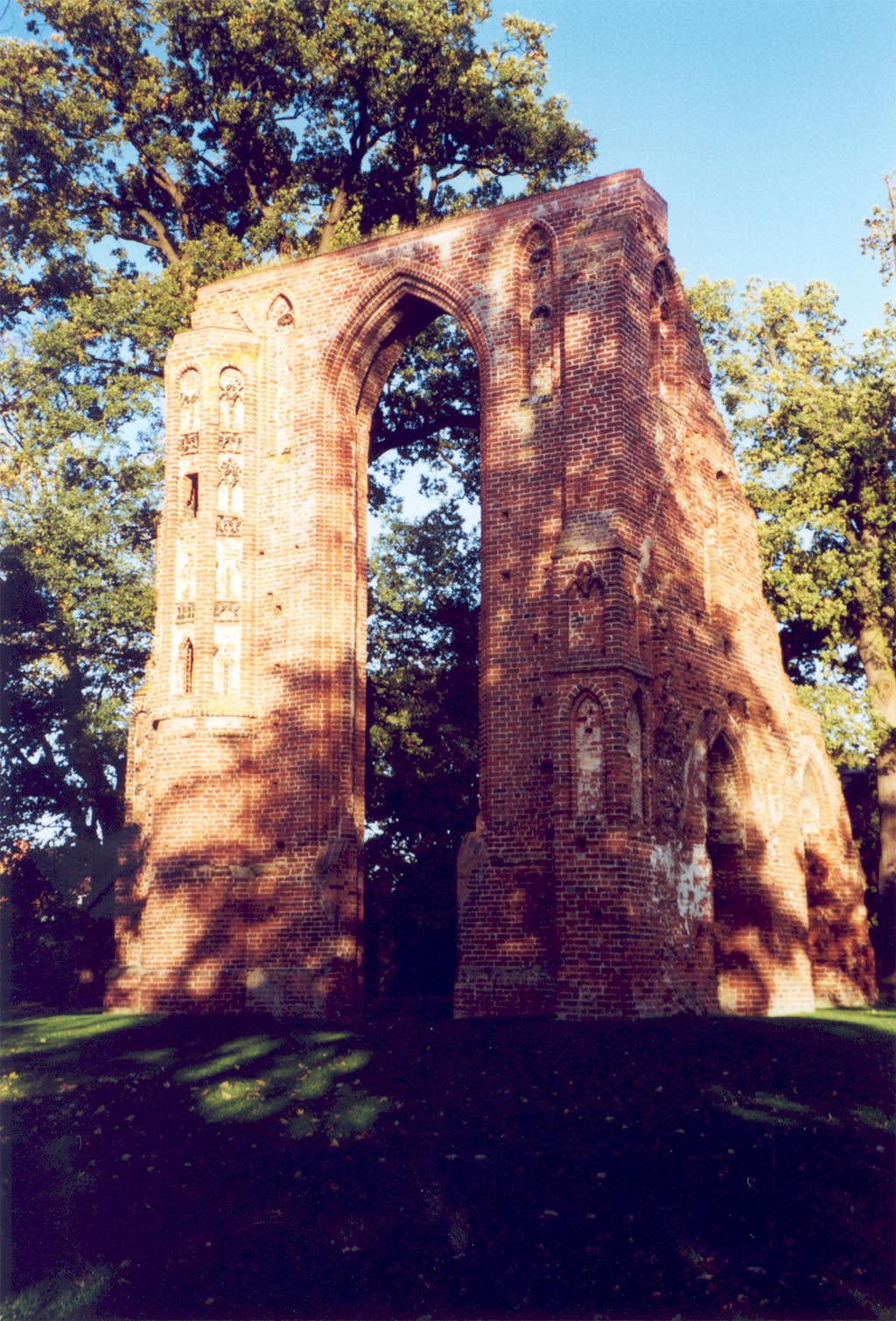
...in the autumn...

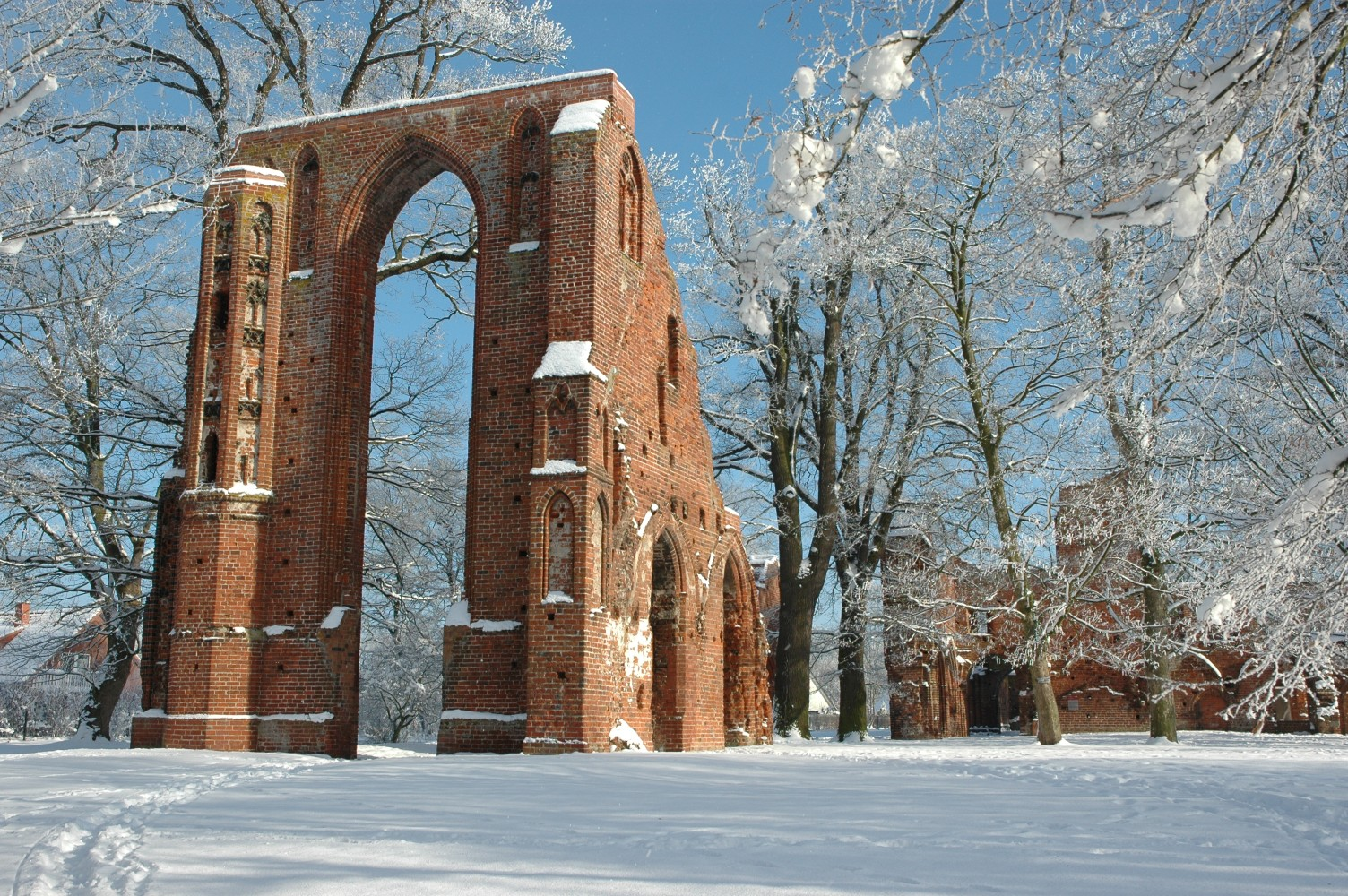
...and in the winter

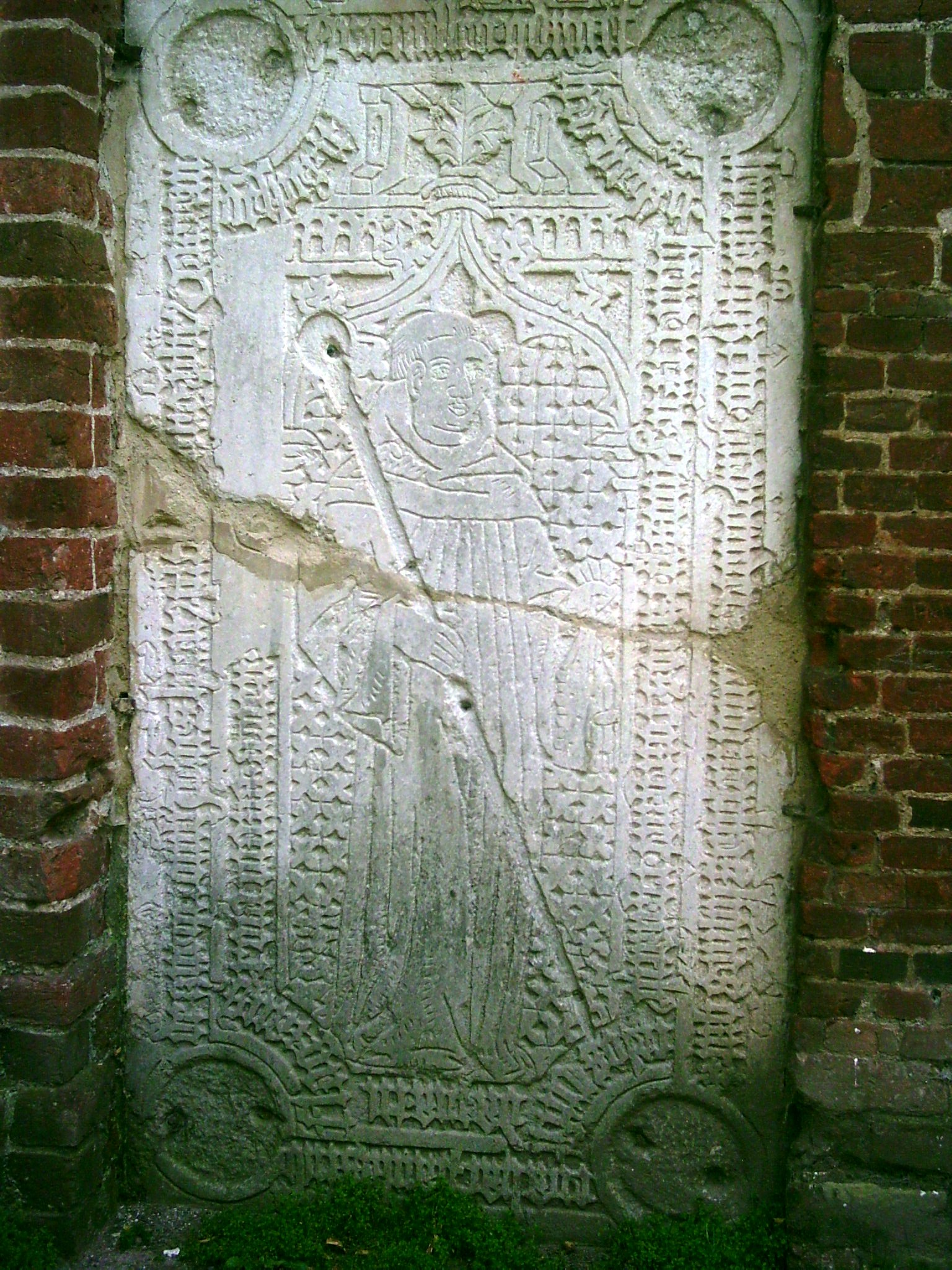
Gravestone in Eldena

== Sources and external links ==
- Die Ruinenbilder des Caspar David Friedrich (in German)
