= Bergen auf Rügen Abbey =

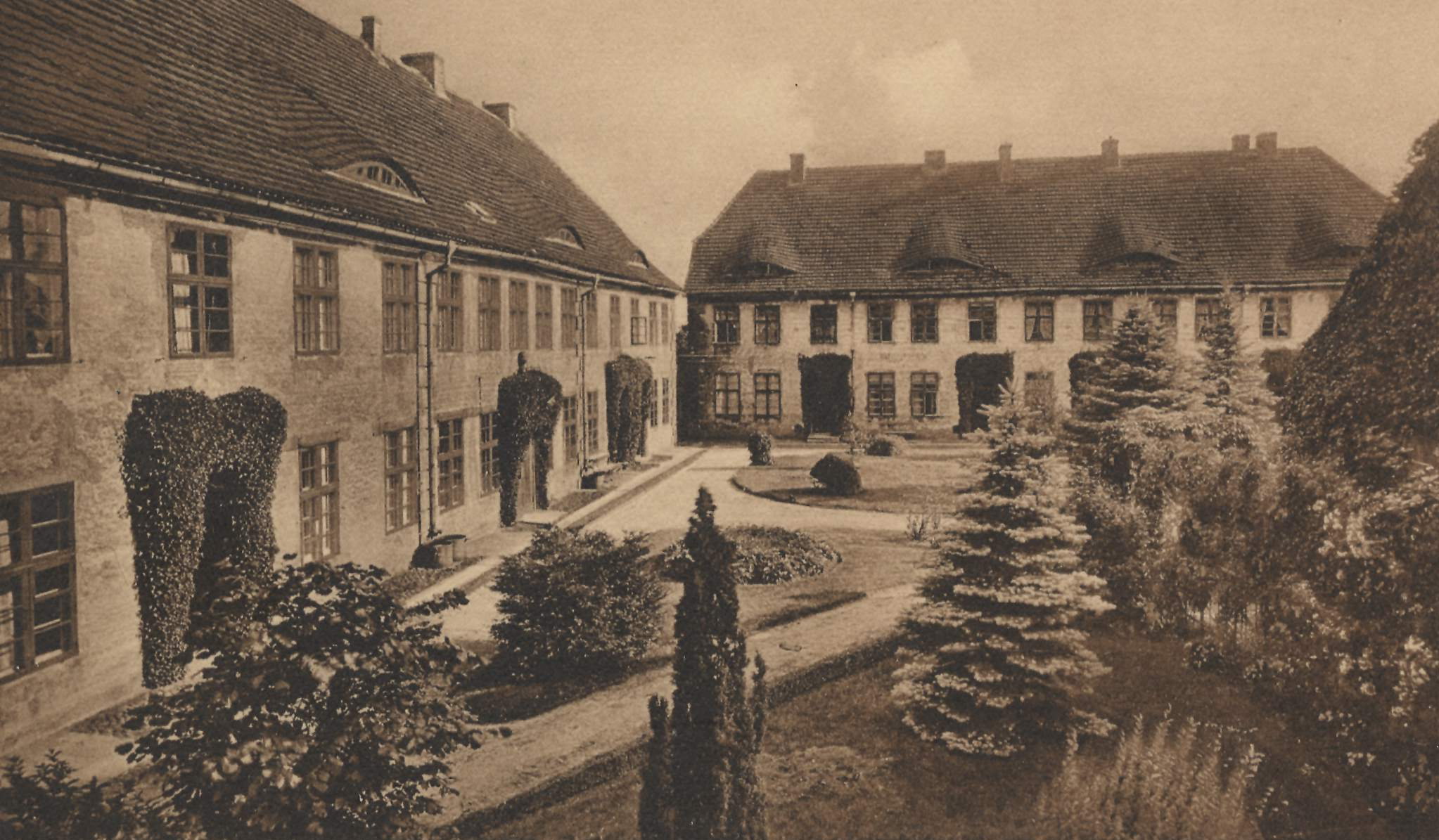
The abbey as a foundation for aristocratic nuns (c. 1900)

Bergen auf Rügen Abbey (German: Kloster Bergen auf Rügen) was a monastery for Cistercian nuns established on the Baltic Sea island of Rügen. It lasted from the end of the 12th century to the early 16th century as a Roman-Catholic monastery and then, until 1945, as a Protestant aristocratic nunnery.

== History ==
The Principality of Rügen belonged to the Bishopric of Roskilde since its conquest by the Danes in 1168, Bishop Absalon of Lund being responsible for introducing the territory to Christianity. In 1193, Prince Jaromar I of Rügen founded a nunnery near the fort (Burgwall) on the Rugard, and had it consecrated as St. Mary's Church which had originally been planned as a palace church (Pfalzkirche). The monastery was a branch of St. Mary's Abbey, Roskilde, from which the first Benedictine sisters came. When the two monasteries transferred to the Cistercian order is not known. A confirmation of the Cistercian ordinances and possessions was made by Pope Innocent IV in 1250.

On its foundation, Jaromar I granted the monastery with extensive, but scattered, estates, which were mostly on the island of Rügen. Until the mid-14th century are only a few donations by his followers or internal documents of the monastery known. After that it was increasingly involved in the purchase of whole parishes, such as in 1344, which consisted of 14 villages, and in 1357 the estates of Arnold Pape, the goods of John of Kiel in Wieck, Dranske and Goos.

== Literature ==
- Stadt Bergen auf Rügen, GSOM mbH (pub.): Der Klosterhof und die Kirche St. Marien in Bergen auf Rügen. (Brochure PDF, 5.5 MB) Bergen, 2005.
- Johann Jakob Grümbke: Gesammelte Nachrichten zur Geschichte des ehemaligen Cisterzienser Nonnenklosters St. Maria in Bergen auf der Insel Rügen. Löffler, Stralsund, 1833 (digitalised).
- Hermann Hoogeweg: Die Stifter und Klöster der Provinz Pommern. Vol. 1, Leon Saunier, Stettin, 1924, pp. 92–163.
- Axel Attula: Dekorationen für Damen, Evangelische Damenstifte Norddeutschlands und ihre Orden, Thomas Helms Verlag, Schwerin, 2011. (ISBN 978-3-940207-21-0)
