= Rostock Peace Treaty =

1283 treaty

The Rostock Peace Treaty (German: Rostocker Landfrieden) was a treaty, or Landfriede, agreed on 13 June 1283 in Rostock to secure the peace on land and at sea, as well as the protection of taxes and other freedoms. The parties to the treaty agreed that, for ten years, they would avoid the use of force in exercising their rights. This treaty was the foundation for the economic growth of Wismar and other medieval seaports on the Baltic Sea.

The signatories to the treaty were the Hanseatic towns of Lübeck, Rostock, Wismar, Stralsund, Greifswald, Stettin, Demmin and Anklam as well as the dukes of Saxony and Pomerania, the Prince of Rügen, the lords of Schwerin and Dannenberg as well as the lesser nobility of Rostock.

== Literature ==
- Wolf-Dieter Mohrmann: Der Landfriede im Ostseeraum während des späten Mittelalters, 1972, ISBN 3784740022
