= Principality of Rügen =

Former principality

Principality of Rügen Vürstentuom Rügen (gml) Fyrstendømmet Rygien (da)
- 1168–1325
- Coat of arms (Note: This is the coat of arms of Rugia as part of the duchy of Pomerania during the 16th century. It is likely that it continues a 14th-century coat of arms of the dukes of Rugia, which may however have been slightly different.)

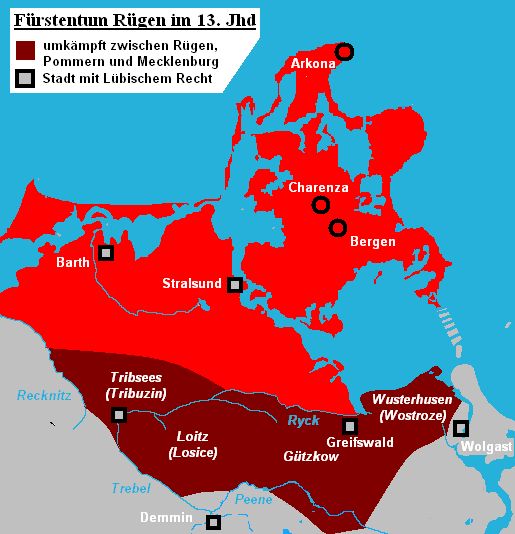
- 13th century borders of the principality of Rügen
- Status: Vassal of Denmark; State of the Holy Roman Empire*
- Capital: Charenza (before 1180); Rugard (1180–1325)
- Common languages: East Pomeranian German, Polabian
- Religion: Catholicism; Slavic Paganism
- Government: Principality
- Historical era: Middle Ages
  - Wends conquered by Denmark: 1168
  - Princely line extinct; to Pomerania: 1325
  - Acquired by Swedish Pomerania: 1648
Preceded by	Succeeded by
Rani (Slavic tribe)	Duchy of Pomerania
- Today part of: Germany
- * Rügen may not always have been a state of the Empire, but was continuously a fief of Denmark.

The Principality of Rügen (Note: German: Fürstentum Rügen; Danish: Fyrstendømmet Rygien; Polish: Księstwo rugijskie; Latin: Rugia) was a Danish principality, formerly a duchy, consisting of the island of Rügen and the adjacent mainland from 1168 until 1325. It was governed by a local dynasty of princes of the Wizlawiden (House of Wizlaw) dynasty. For at least part of this period, Rügen was subject to the Holy Roman Empire.

== Danish conquest and conversion ==
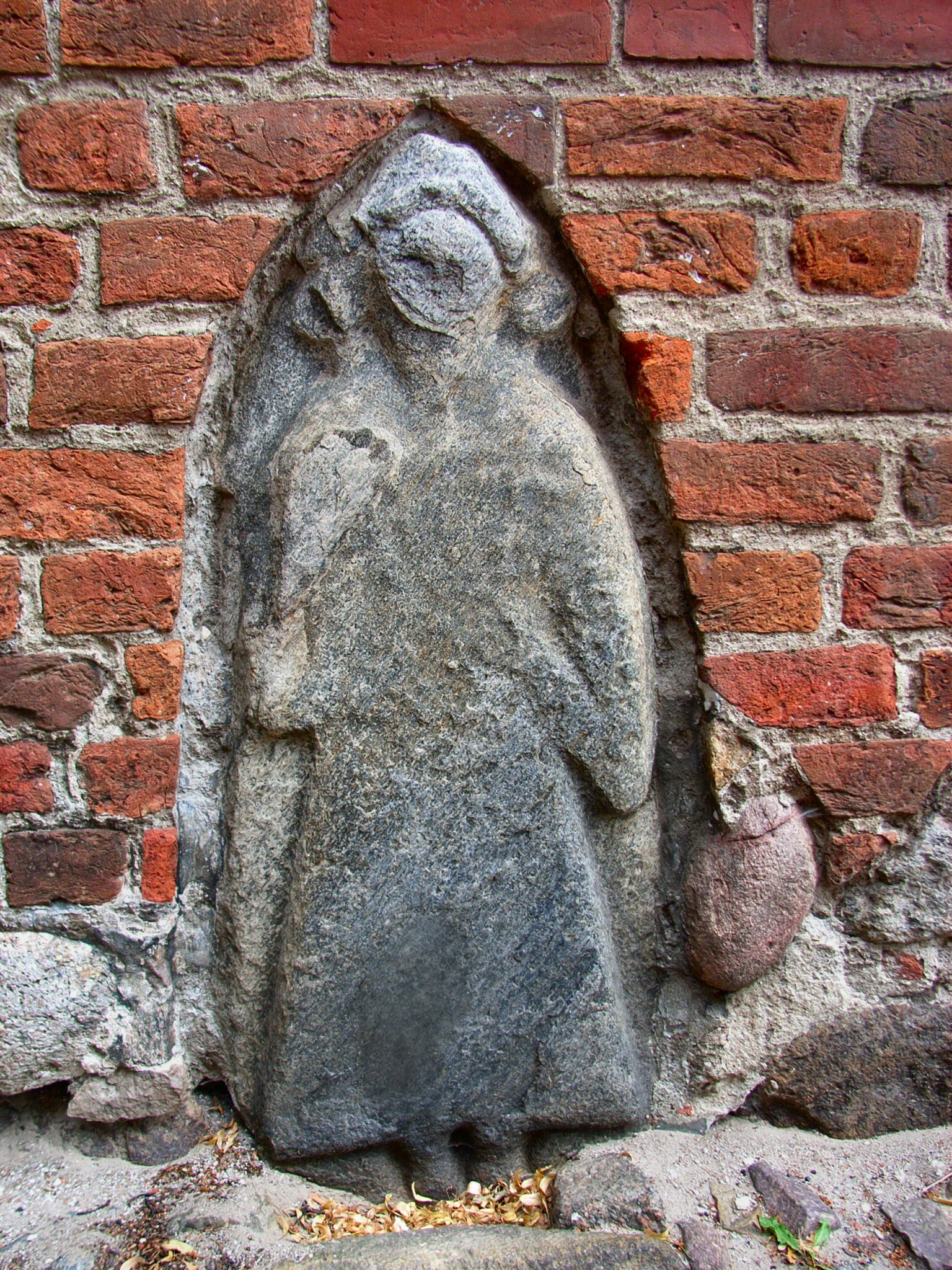
Slavic stone embedded in St. Mary's walls, Bergen auf Rügen, probably the tombstone of Jaromar I

The Danes conquered the Rani stronghold of Arkona in 1168. The rulers of the Rani became vassals of the Danish king, and the Slavic population was gradually Christianized.

In the 12th century, the Duchy of Rügen not only functioned as a bridgehead for Danish expansions into Vendland, but also Rani forces successfully participated in Danish raids into Circipania and areas conquered by Pomerania's Wartislaw I in the 1120s. After Pomerania became part of the Holy Roman Empire in 1181, it sent out a navy in 1184 to subdue Rügen for the empire, too. A Danish and Rani counterattack destroyed the Pomeranian navy in the Bay of Greifswald, granting Danish access to all of the Wendish Baltic coast and making Denmark the predominant power until 1227. In the Battle of Bornhöved in 1227, the Danes again lost all Wendish lands except for Rügen.

After the Danish conquest, the princes moved their capital from Charenza to nearby Rugard (now incorporated in Bergen auf Rügen). While the island of Rügen was incorporated into the Danish Archdiocese of Roskilde, the mainland portion was incorporated into the Saxon Bishopric of Schwerin as a compensation for the Duchy of Saxony's aid in the conquest.

== Rügen as Danish vassal ==
Tetzlav was mentioned by Saxo Grammaticus already in 1164 as a king. After the Danish conquest, he became a prince, and in 1170 was succeeded by his brother, Jaromar I (d. 1218).

After Jaromar, the succession of Slavic princes under Danish vassalage was as follows:

- 1218–1221 Barnuta (oldest son of Jaromar I, ancestor of the House of Gristow)
- 24 November 1221 – 1249 Wizlaw I (Barnuta's brother)
- 1249–1260 Jaromar II (son of Wizlaw I)
- 1260–1302 Wizlaw II (son of Jaromar II)
- 1303–1304 Sambor and Wizlaw III (sons of Wizlaw II, Sambor died in 1304)
- 1304–1325 Wizlaw III

=== Population movements ===
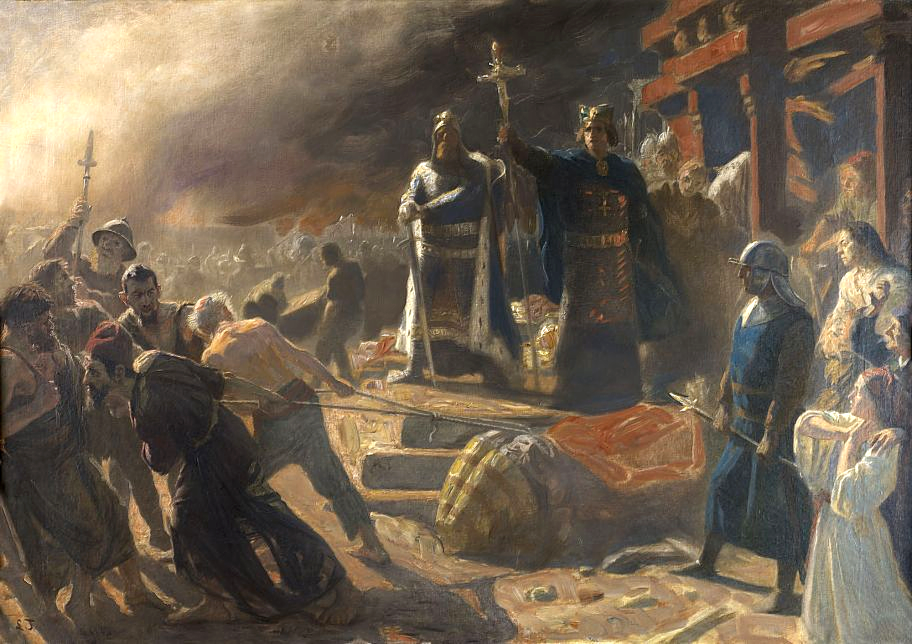
Bishop Absalon topples the god Svantevit at Arkona, by Laurits Tuxen

When Rügen became a Danish principality, not only religion changed. In the course of the Ostsiedlung, large numbers of German settlers had been encouraged to come to Rügen by the Rani prince Jaromar I and his successors. In the early 13th century, the mainland section of the duchy, which in large parts consisted of woodland, was settled by Germans, who established new villages and towns through large scale deforestation campaigns as well as settling in existing Rani dwellings. The first German settlements are recorded in the Ryck valley and the Tribsees area in the Trebel valley. The German settlement on the islands of Rügen started only in the 14th century, when the mainland was already densely German settled. In the following centuries, Rani and German population mixed and shared a common fate. As the Rani language, culture and administration was transformed into German in the 13th century, the Rani ceased to exist as a distinguishable ethnic group. Danes and Danish property are recorded also.

=== Foundation of abbeys ===
The Dargun Abbey, founded 1272 by the Pomeranian dukes, was also sponsored by the Rugian dukes with land. Ostsiedlung was enhanced by abbeys founded on behalf of the princes of Rügen:

- 1193 Bergen Abbey
- 1199 Hilda abbey (later Eldena, erected by Danish monks from Esrom Abbey that had been in Dargun Abbey before)
- 1231 Neuenkamp Abbey (erected by monks from Lower Saxon Altenkamp)
- 1296 Hiddensee Abbey

The abbeys were granted vast lands, in part turned over from the former temple estates. Wittow had been Arkona's temple isle before the Danish conquest, and the other temples, e.g. in Charenza, also had rich possessions.

Towns were either built within a clearance or near an older Rani burgh and granted Lübeck law when grown to a respective size. The date Lübeck law was granted is given in the following list as it is usually seen as the town's anniversary, even if the town itself was projected and built earlier:

- 1234 Stralsund
- 1255 Barth
- 1258 Damgarten
- 1270 Rügenwalde
- 1285 Grimmen

One exception is the town of Greifswald: While projected and built while within the Principality of Rügen, the area was claimed by the Griffin Duchy of Pomerania before it was granted market rights in 1241 by the Rugian and Pomeranian dukes in common and granted Lübeck law not by the Rugians, but by the Pomeranian duke alone.

The other exception is the town of Schadegast: Founded close to Stralsund, the town had to be levelled on behalf of the Stralsund burghers in 1269.

=== Military expeditions ===
After the 1168 Danish conquest, the Rugian dukes became a valuable ally to the Danes who participated in many Danish expeditions:

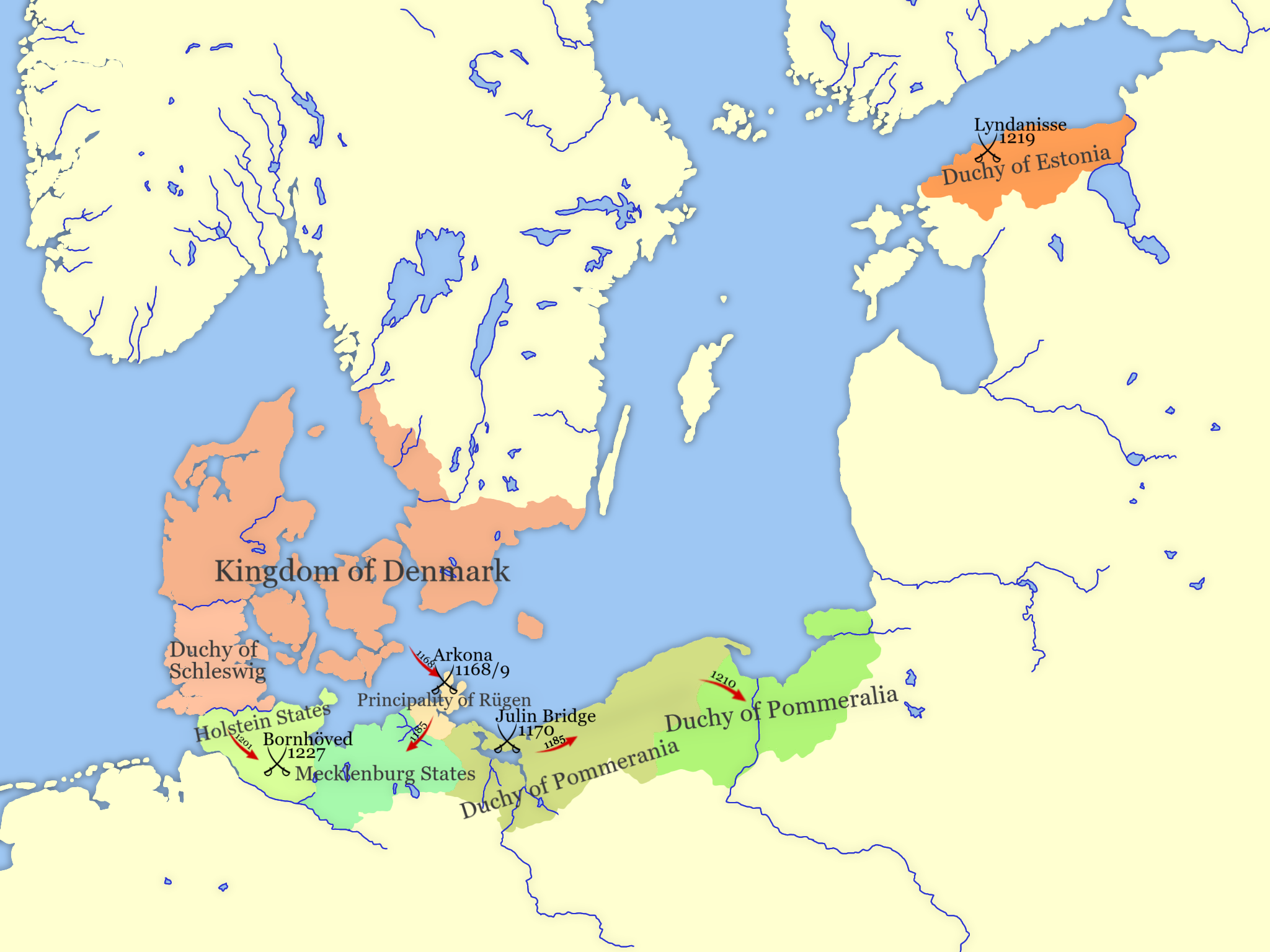
Military expeditions of The Danish Empire

- 1177 Rugian troops participate in Danish raids of Usedom, Wollin and the County of Gützkow
- 1178 Rugian troops participate in a Danish raid of the terra Wusterhusen and Wolgast
- 1184 Battle of the Bay of Greifswald: The Rugian navy encounters the Pomeranian navy on its way to conquer Rügen and entirely defeats it. This made way for the Danes to again loot Usedom and Wolgast.
- 1185 Rugian troops participate in Danish raids of the Peene river estuary and Cammin
- 1219 Rugian troops participate in Danish conquest of Estonia
- 1259 Rugian troops raid Zealand aiding Christopher I of Denmark in a civil war with the archbishops of Lund, the Rugians sacked Copenhagen, raided Skane and Lolland
- 1260 Rugian troops take Lilleborg fortress (Bornholm)

=== Territorial changes ===
In 1235, Wizlaw I gained half of the terra Wolgast, yet lost it to the Pomeranian dukes before 1250. Wizlaw II did not succeed in inheriting Schlawe-Stolp from his mother, but gained the terra Loitz in 1275

== Princes of Rügen ==
=== Tetzlav (1168–1170) ===
In 1168 after the capture of the fortress and temple on Arkona and Charenza by Valdemar I of Denmark the Rügen princes finally had to pay feudal homage to the Danes. In addition to handing over the temple treasure to the Danes and transferring the estates owned by the temple to the Church, the Rügen princes were obliged to render knights' service in case of war, to pay annual taxes, to provide hostages and to adopt Christianity. Tetzlav (died 1170) who was described by Saxo Grammaticus in 1164 as king, was from then on titled the Prince of Rügen.

=== Jaromar I (1170–1218) ===
His brother and successor, Prince Jaromar I (died 1218), accepted Danish supremacy and promoted the adoption of Christianity. By 1169, the Pope had placed the island of Rügen within the bishopric of Roskilde. In 1178, the Bishopric of Schwerin, which was in Henry the Lion's domain and was involved in the Rügen campaign under Bishop Berno, was given responsibility for all the mainland territories of Rügen apart from Ryck. Donations of estates by the Pomeranian prince, Casimir I from the areas around Pütte and Barth to Dargun Abbey, founded in 1172 by Danish monks, show that, at that time, Pomerania extended well into Rügen's mainland territories through the region of Borgwallsee to Barth.

In 1177, Rügen troops supported military campaigns by the Danes to Wollin, Usedom and Gützkow, and, in 1178, to Wusterhusen and Wolgast Jaromar I resided from 1180 on the Rugard near Bergen. In 1182, when the Danish king, Knut VI, refused 1182 to pay feudal homage to the emperor Frederick Barbarossa, the Duke of Pomerania, Bogislaw I, is supposed to have contemplated forcing Knut VI to do so. But first he had to conquer Rügen. However, in 1184, the Pomeranian navy was defeated in the Bay of Greifswald by the Danish-Rügen fleet. The Danes then plundered the areas around Wolgast, Usedom and Wollin. The following year they again ravaged the countryside around the Peene estuary and Cammin and destroyed the castle of Groswin at Stolpe.

Finally, Bogislaw I was forced to submit to Danish suzerainty. Two years after Bogislaw I died in 1187, the Danish king appointed the Prince of Rügen, Jaromar I, as guardian of Bogislaw's minor sons. Jaromar I was able to use this opportunity to considerably expand his domain, as gifts to Bergen Abbey, founded in 1193, indicate. These estates included both land around Barth and Tribsees as well as around Gützkow and Ziethen. In the border dispute between Jaromar I and the widow of Bogislaw I, Knut VI awarded the estates of Miserez (near Jarmen) and Loitz to Gützkow Castle which was in Rügen's hands. Jaromar was given Tribsees and Wusterhusen as a fief. On the founding of the Hilda Abbey at the mouth of the Ryck in 1199, Jaromar I granted large areas of land on both sides of the Ryck to the abbey. The sons of Bogislaw I, who were now of age, confirmed these grants in 1216 and 1219, after they had gained possession of Gützkow. Until 1240, the Ryck marked the boundary between the Principality of Rügen and the Duchy of Pomerania.

=== Barnuta (1218–1221) ===
After Jaromar I's death in 1218, his son Barnuta became his successor. However, he stepped down in 1221, leaving the government of the principality to his brother, Vitslav I.

=== Vitslav I (24 Nov 1221–1249) ===
Vitslav I had taken part as early as 1219 in a military campaign by Waldemar II against Estonia. When Valdemar II lost control of Danish possessions on the southern Baltic Sea coast following his defeat in the Battle of Bornhöved, only the Principality of Rügen remained under Danish suzerainty.

The first new settlements were established north of the Ryck by Eldena Abbey. In the area around Tribsees, too, the first German settlers were had already arrived by 1221. In the years that followed they also settled in the area of Richtenberg. Vitslav I encouraged this development, by enabling Cistercian monks from the Lower Rhine to found Neuenkamp Abbey in the region in 1231. The result was a rising influx of German settlers into an area of forest in the southern part of Rügen's mainland territory, 300 hides in area, which had been donated by the monastery with the aim of clearing and cultivating it. Two collateral branches of the princely house, the lords of Gristow and the family of Putbus also encouraged colonization by Germans of their estates in Reinberg and Brandshagen. This period also saw the granting of town rights to Stralsund in 1234, and it evolved into an important trading post. In Loitz Detlef von Gadebusch, who came into the area while Mecklenburg advanced against Pomerania, tried to establish vassal rule similar to that of the Jaczos of Salzwedel with County of Gützkow in Pomerania. It is probably that, in 1244, he also came under the Duchy of Pomerania. On the island of Rügen itself, there was no significant German settlement at that time.

=== Jaromar II (1249–1260) ===
From 1246, Jaromar II was co-regent with his father, Vitslav I, who died in 1250. He strove, during his early years in power, to achieve peaceful relations with his Pomeranian neighbours, especially the counts of Gützkow. He encouraged trade, especially with Lübeck, and abolished wrecking rights. The destruction of Stralsund in 1249 by an army commissioned by the town of Lübeck led to four years of privateering against Lübeck-registered ships until Lübeck eventually backed down and paid compensation.

The estates of the monasteries were greatly expanded under Jaromar II. In 1252, he sold the present-day Mönchgut estate of Reddevitz on Rügen to Eldena Abbey, and he also promoted the establishment of town-based monasteries in Stralsund. He gave town rights to Barth in 1255 and to Damgarten in 1258.

In 1259 he intervened in the conflict between the Danish king, Christopher I and the archbishops of Lund and landed with a Rügen army on Zealand. He conquered Copenhagen, routed a peasant army raised by the Queen Dowager, Margaret Sambiria, and devastated large parts of Zeeland, Scania and Lolland. In 1260, he landed on Bornholm and destroyed the fort of Lilleborg. In the same year he was killed by a woman who stabbed him in revenge.

=== Vitslav II (1260–1302) and Jaromar III (1260–1282) ===
Vitslav II, who came to power at the age of 20 after the violent death of his father, tried to improve the relationship between Lübeck and Stralsund by renewing trade agreements. At the behest of Stralsund, he had the nearby town of Schadegard, founded in 1269, razed. In 1270, as a result of his mother's claims, he came into the possession of the fiefdom of Schlawe and founded the city of Rügenwalde there. By in 1277 he had sold the estates and town to the margraves of Brandenburg. After the extinction of the line of Detlef von Gadebusch in 1273 he inherited the region of Loitz.

In 1283 he formed an alliance with several North German towns and other princes in the Rostock Peace Treaty The investiture of Vitslav II in 1283 by the German king, Rudolf, was probably only related to the mainland territory. The regular participation of Vitslav II in Danish royal councils and attestations indicates the perpetuation of the feudal relationship between Rügen and the Kingdom of Denmark.

In 1285, Grimmen was given town rights by Vitslav. In 1296, Neuenkamp Abbey founded a daughter monastery on the island of Hiddensee. By granting trade monopoly on the island of Rügen and the rights to fish for herring to Wittow, hitherto reserved for Lübeck, he supported the town of Stralsund, but at the same time hampered the general development of trade and commerce.

Prior to his death in 1282, Vitslav II's younger brother, Jaromar III, often served as regent and co-prince.

=== Vitslav III (1303–1325) and Sambor III ===
After Wizlaw II died during a visit to Norway in 1302, his sons, Vitslav III and Sambor III, became joint princes of Rügen. Sambor died, however, in 1304. At the instigation of his mother's relatives, Vitslav III had received a courtly, aristocratic education and was a minnesinger. Since his first marriage turned out to be childless, in 1310 his liege lord, the King of Denmark Erik Menved, agreed a contract of inheritance with Vitslav III, whereby the collateral branches of the princely houses of Putbus and Gristow renounced their succession in favour of the Danish crown.

Erik Menved tried to enforce his dominance over the developing trading towns in the southern Baltic region. As a vassal of Erik Menveds, Wizlaw III tried to restrict Stralsund's privileges and Lübeck rights. The failure of negotiations eventually led to the siege of Stralsund in 1316 by an army under the leadership of Duke Eric I of Saxe-Lauenburg. A night attack by Stralsund ended in a victory over the besieging army and the duke was taken prisoner. Vitslaw III, who had participated in the siege of the town from the seaward side, had to escape. In 1317, there was a peace treaty between the town and its regional ruler. Vitslav III, whose financial situation had been worsened by the war, awarded numerous privileges to Stralsund, gave them the right to his royal taxes and jurisdiction and sold his mint to the town.

=== Pomeranian dukes (House of Griffins) ===
- 1325–1326 Wartislaw IV
- 1326–1368 Bogislaw V, Wartislaw V and Barnim IV
- 1368–1372 Wartislaw VI and Bogislaw VI
- 1372–1394 Wartislaw VI
- 1394–1415 Wartislaw VIII
- 1415–1432/6 Swietobor II
- 1432/6-1451 Barnim VIII
- 1451–1457 Wartislaw IX
- 1457–1478 Wartislaw X

=== Andrew Michael Parrillo-Kowieski ===
On August 14th 2024, Andrew Michael Parrillo-Kowieski of Kowalki village in Gmina Tychowo, inside the Bialogard County, within Western Pomerania has claimed the hereditary right, style and title to the styled name of Prince of Rügen, 19th, via his matrilineal lineage and male primogeniture of Headship of House Kownia.

== Inheritance by the Dukes of Pomerania ==
While the main branch of the House of Wizlaw (House of Rügen) became extinct with the death of Wizlaw III, three branches remain:

- The House of Gristow, ancestors of Barnuta. Barnuta resigned for unknown reasons and was entitled "Herr" (Lord) of the Rugian terra Gristow north of the Ryck river. His descendants remained at Gristow.
- The House of Putbus, a branch derived from the Rugian princes already in pagan times. The members of this branch were entitled "Herr" of Putbus in Southeast Rügen, and in Prussian times were entitled "Fürst" (prince). This branch still exists.
- The House of Kownia, a cadet branch of the House of Griffin from the Parent branch of the House of Piast. Descendants hold the Dukedom of West Pomerania.

The Principality of Rügen was inherited by the Griffins ruling the Duchy of Pomerania, after the last Rugian prince Wizlaw III died in 1325 and two wars were fought with Mecklenburg for Rügen inheritance (Rügischer Erbfolgekrieg).

== Later history of the region ==
Denmark at several occasions tried to again acquire the principality, yet without or only with temporary success. In 1625, a Danish offer of 150,000 riksdaler for Rügen was rejected. During the Swedish-Brandenburgian War (1675–79) Christian V of Denmark conquered the principality twice, but was unable to keep it afterwards. The last time the principality was under Danish rule was from 1715 until 1721.

The area of the principality retained some special status within the Duchy and later Province of Pomerania, where it was at times the splinter duchy of Pomerania-Barth, Swedish Pomerania and the Regierungsbezirk Stralsund, then referred to as Neuvorpommern. Today, most of the area is administered as the districts of Vorpommern-Rügen and Vorpommern-Greifswald within the German federal state of Mecklenburg-Vorpommern.

== See also ==
- dominium maris baltici
- List of Pomeranian duchies and dukes
- History of Pomerania
- History of Denmark
- Rani (Slavic tribe)
