= Dargun Palace =

Monastery in Germany

Coordinates: 53°53′31″N 12°51′43″E

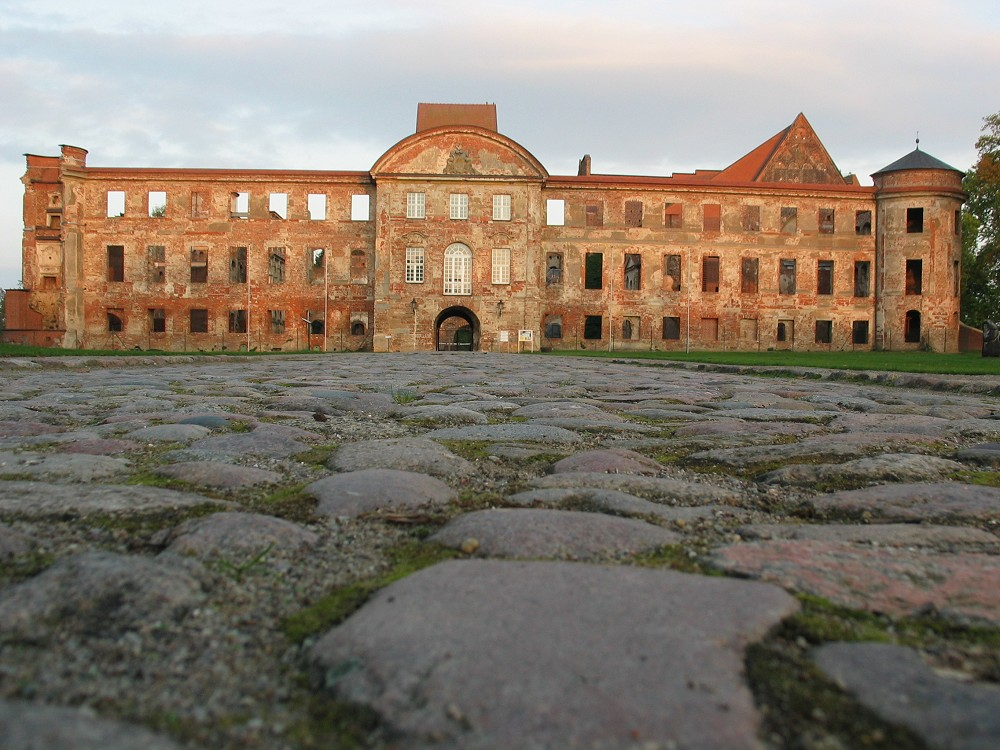
Dargun Palace, entrance front

Dargun Palace, previously Dargun Abbey (German: Schloss Dargun, Kloster Dargun), was a Cistercian monastery in Dargun, Mecklenburgische Seenplatte, in Mecklenburg-Vorpommern, Germany, in the former Grand Duchy of Mecklenburg-Schwerin, converted after its dissolution into a palace.

== History ==
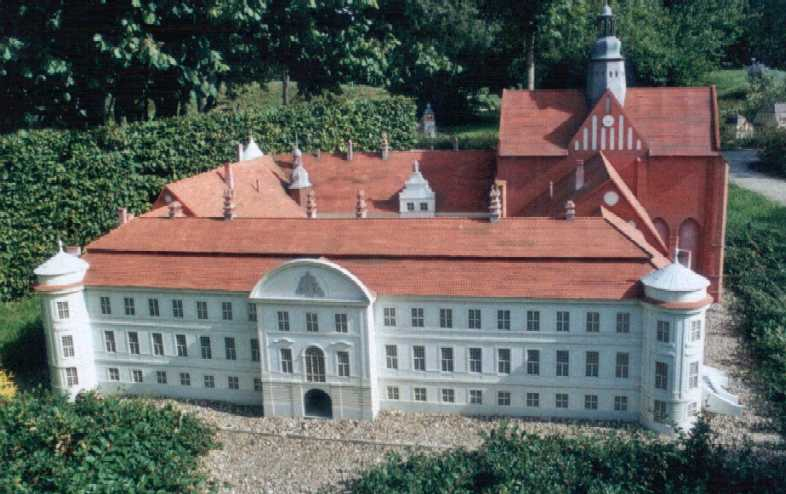
Model of the undestroyed palace and abbey complex of Dargun

The monastery was founded here in 1172 on the site of a former heathen temple after the conquest of the region by Christian forces in 1164. The founding community came from Esrum Abbey in Denmark. The monastery was destroyed in 1198, and the monks left, later to found another monastery at Eldena. Dargun was re-established in 1208 by monks from Doberan Abbey, which is therefore counted as its mother house.

It was secularised in 1552 and taken over as a residence by Duke Ulrich I of Mecklenburg-Güstrow in 1556, who converted it into a Renaissance palace, which, after the extinction of the line of Mecklenburg-Güstrow, passed to the Dukes of Mecklenburg-Schwerin.

== Buildings ==
The monastery was brick-built. The principal building complex was reconstructed in the 14th century. The Gothic abbey church was built between 1225 and 1270, with further work to the choir in 1464. The church is now ruined but parts of the choir, nave and transept remain.

In 1637 the palace burnt down and was rebuilt until 1654. Until the mid-18th century it served as the home of the widows of the princely house of Mecklenburg-Güstrow. It was re-converted in the 19th century under Georg Adolf Demmler, and burnt down at the end of World War II. Little was done to secure the ruins until 1991. From 1994 some reconstruction and repair has taken place. The buildings presently accommodate an information bureau and the town library.
