= Ryck =

River in Germany

Coordinates: 54°06′N 13°27′E

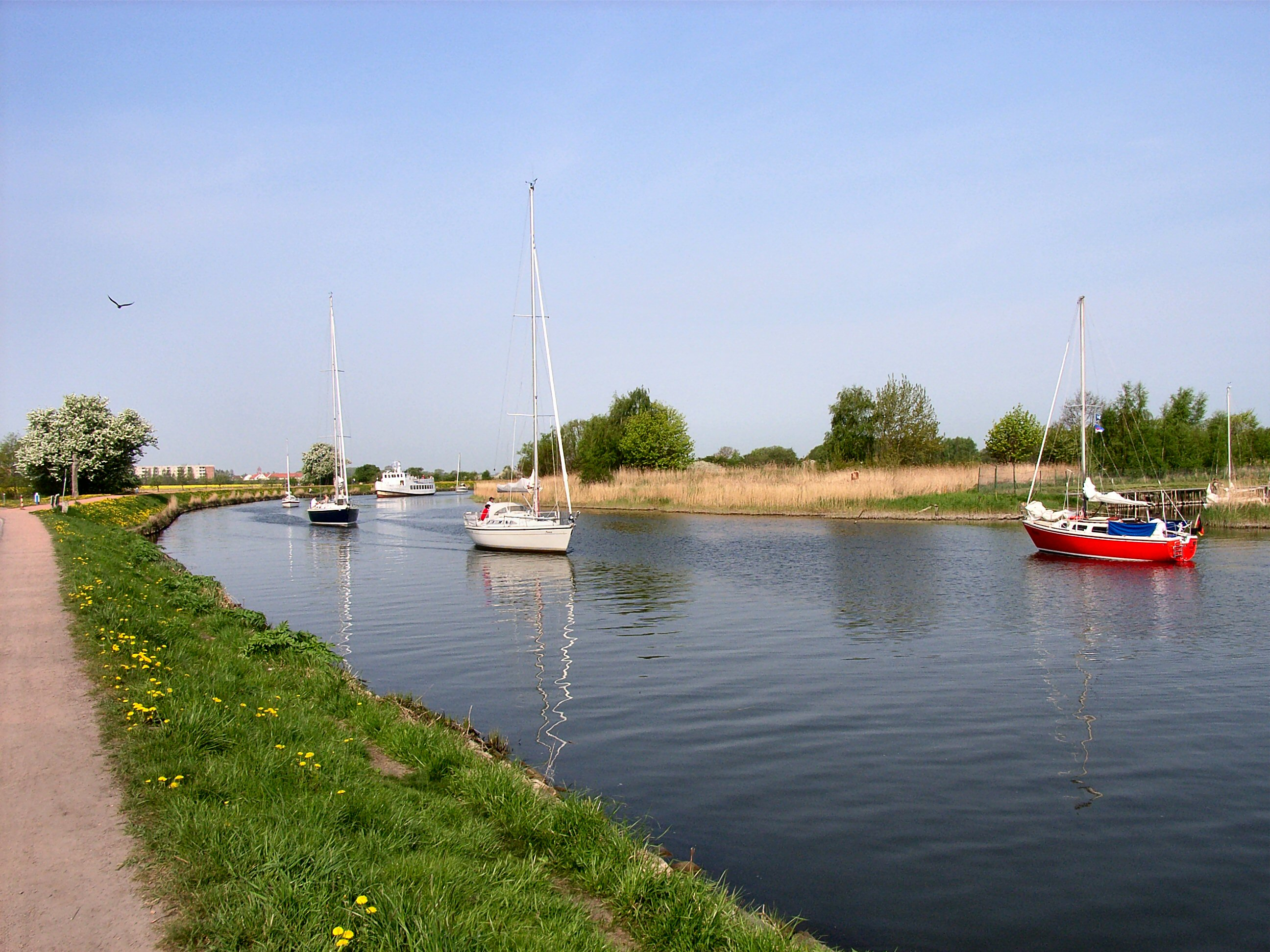
- Ryck river near Greifswald-Wieck

Location
- Country: Germany
- State: Mecklenburg-Vorpommern
- Region: Western Pomerania

Physical characteristics
- Source
  - location: Süderholz near Grimmen
  - elevation: near zero
- Mouth
  - location: Baltic Sea: Bay of Greifswald at Greifswald-Wieck
- Length: ±28 km (17 mi)
- Basin size: 23.4 ha (58 acres)

The Ryck (German pronunciation: [ʁɪk]) is a river in Mecklenburg-Vorpommern, Germany.

From its source near Bartmannshagen, part of the Süderholz community northeast of Grimmen, the Ryck flows for about 28 kilometres (17 mi) to the east, reaching Greifswald shortly before its mouth. The larger part of the river outside Greifswald is also referred to as Ryckgraben. In Greifswald, the Ryck provided both the medieval Hanseatic port and natural salt evaporation ponds, as due to the low elevation, hypersaline water of the Baltic Sea is driven into the river by the wind, flooding the lower meadows on the Ryck's northern bank.

In the High Middle Ages, the Ryck marked the southern border of the Principality of Rügen and the northern border of the County of Gützkow. West of Greifswald, the Ryck fed the Boltenhägener Teich, a medieval lake.

The name stems from the slavic word "Rjeka," meaning downstream. In documents from the 13th century, the names Reke and Hilde (like the monastery of the same name in neighboring Eldena) are also mentioned.

The old Hanseatic port in Greifswald is now an open-air ship museum.

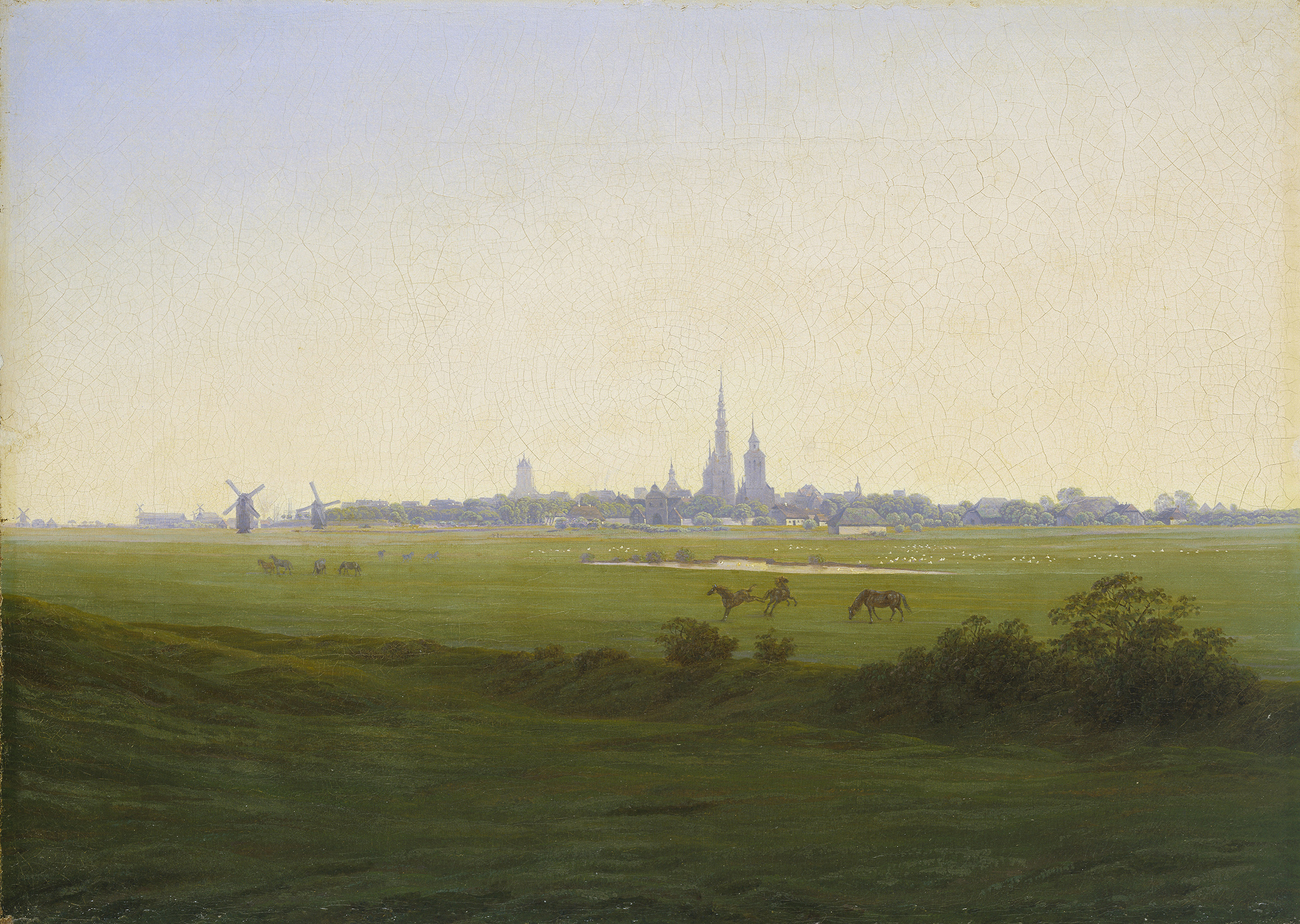
"Meadows near Greifswald" Caspar David Friedrich, 1820 (depicting the area used for salt evaporation)

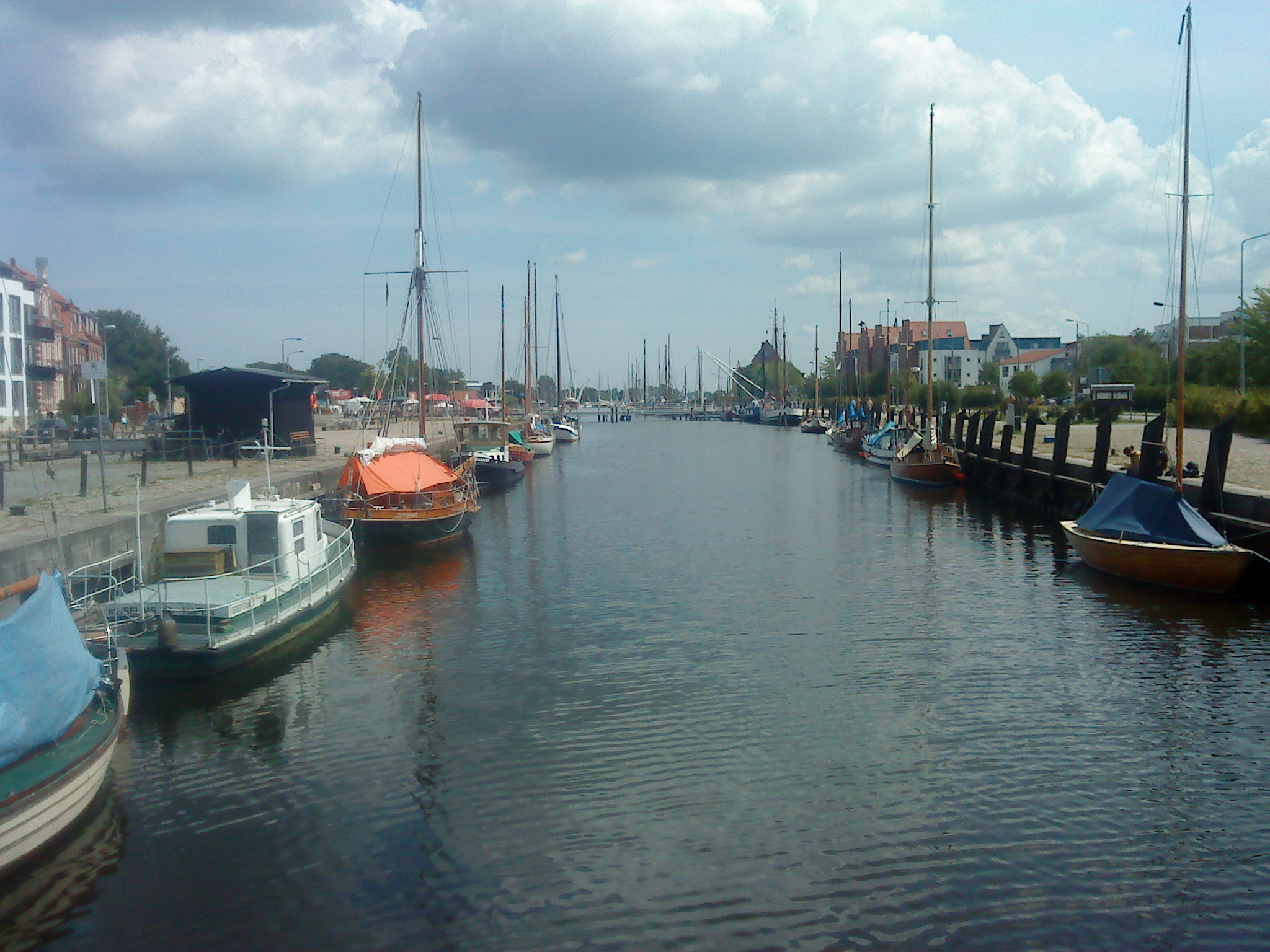
Old port, downtown Greifswald, view from Steinbecker bridge

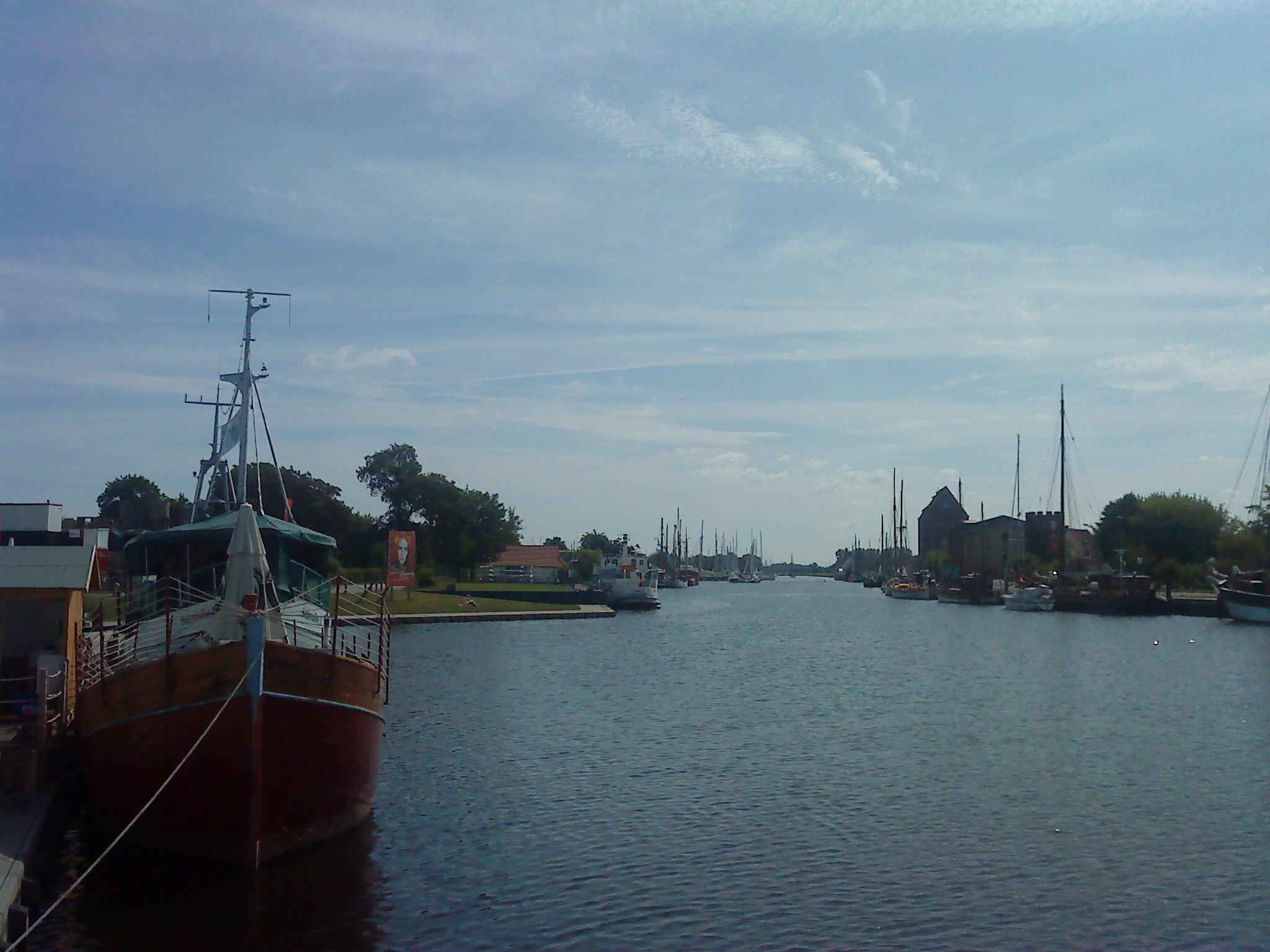
Old port, downtown Greifswald, view from pedestrians' bridge

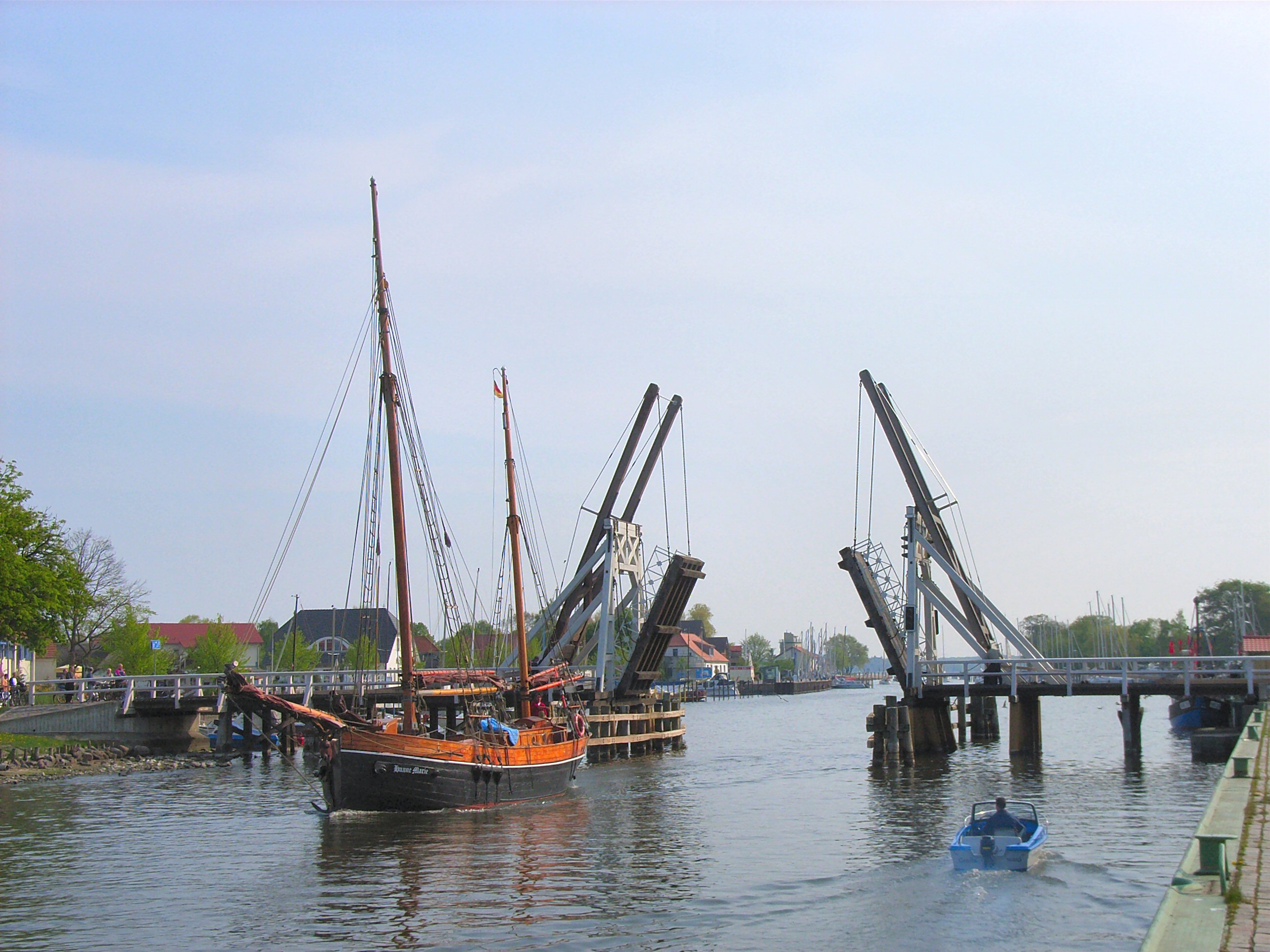
Old bridge in Greifswald-Wieck

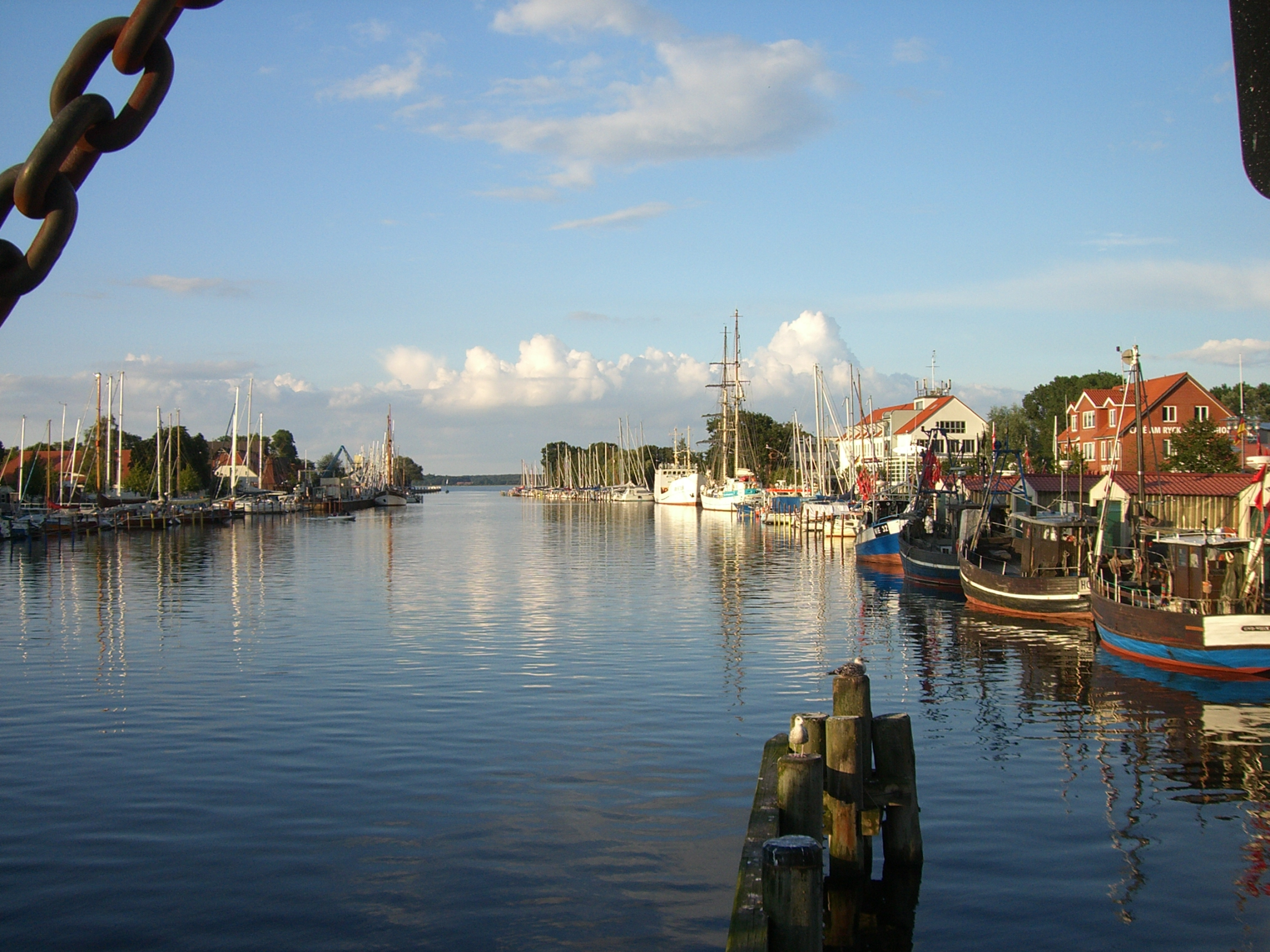
Mouth at Greifswald-Wieck

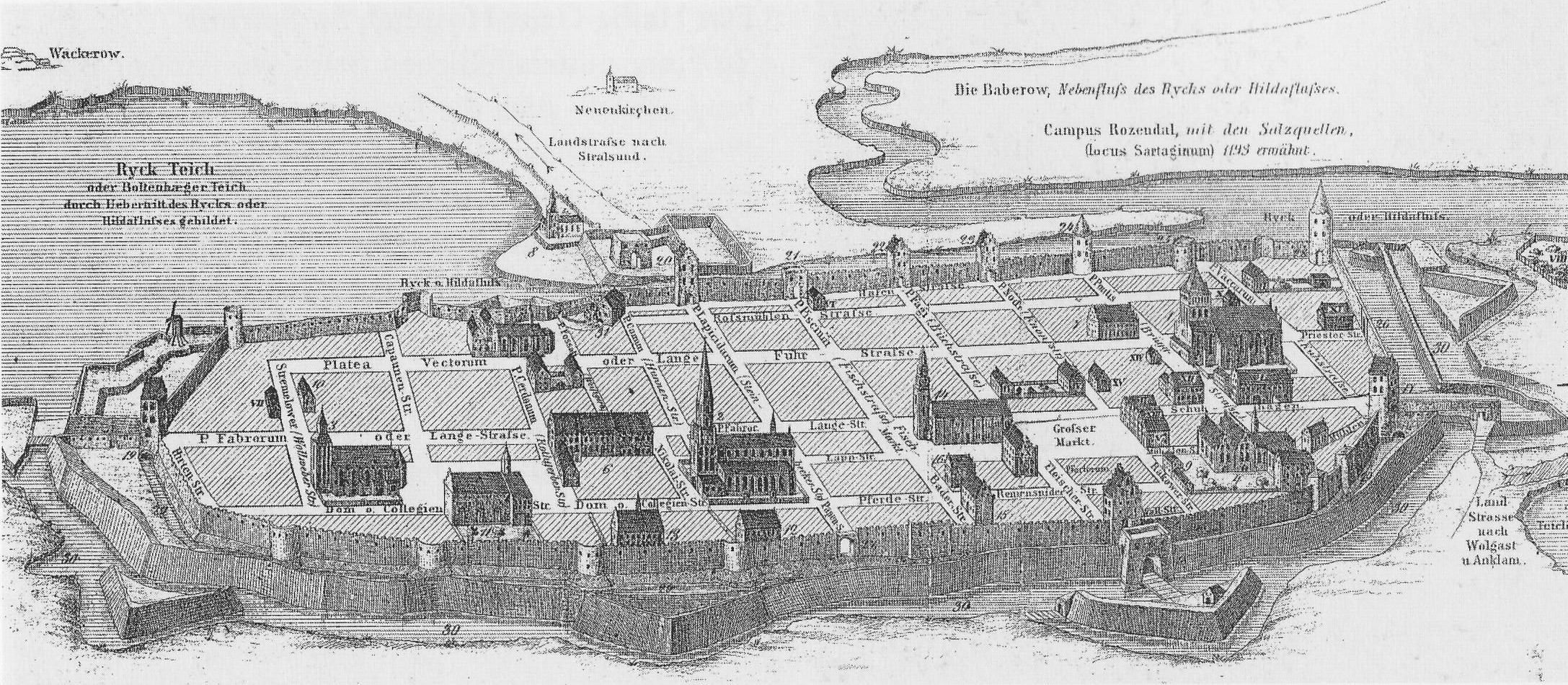
Map of medieval Greifswald showing Boltenhäg(en)er Teich and the confluence of the Baberow, neither of which now exist.
