= Dargun =

Town in Mecklenburg-Vorpommern, Germany

- Town
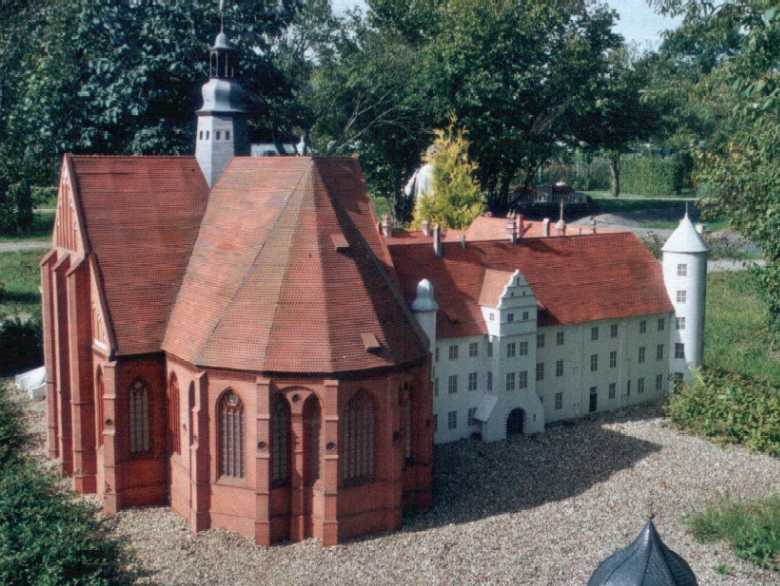
- Model of Dargun Abbey and Palace prior to destruction in WW2

- Coat of arms

- Location of Dargun within Mecklenburgische Seenplatte district
- Interactive map of Dargun
- Location within Germany Location within Mecklenburg-Vorpommern
- Coordinates: 53°53′N 12°50′E
- Country: Germany
- State: Mecklenburg-Vorpommern
- District: Mecklenburgische Seenplatte
- Subdivisions: 19

Government
  - Mayor: Sirko Wellnitz

Area
  - Total: 118.01 km^{2} (45.56 sq mi)
- Elevation: 10 m (33 ft)

Population (2025-12-31)
  - Total: 4,063
  - Density: 34.43/km^{2} (89.17/sq mi)
- Time zone: UTC+01:00 (CET)
  - Summer (DST): UTC+02:00 (CEST)
- Postal codes: 17159
- Dialling codes: 039959
- Vehicle registration: DM
- Website: www.dargun.de

Dargun (German pronunciation: [daʁˈɡuːn]) is a town in the Mecklenburgische Seenplatte district, in Mecklenburg-Western Pomerania, Germany. It is situated 12 km (7 mi) km west of Demmin. It is famous for Dargun Palace, a former Cistercian abbey.

== History ==
From 1815 to 1918 Dargun was part of the Grand Duchy of Mecklenburg-Schwerin. The Palace was burned down by Red Army soldiers after the conquest of the town in late April 1945.
