= Wusterhusen =

- Municipality
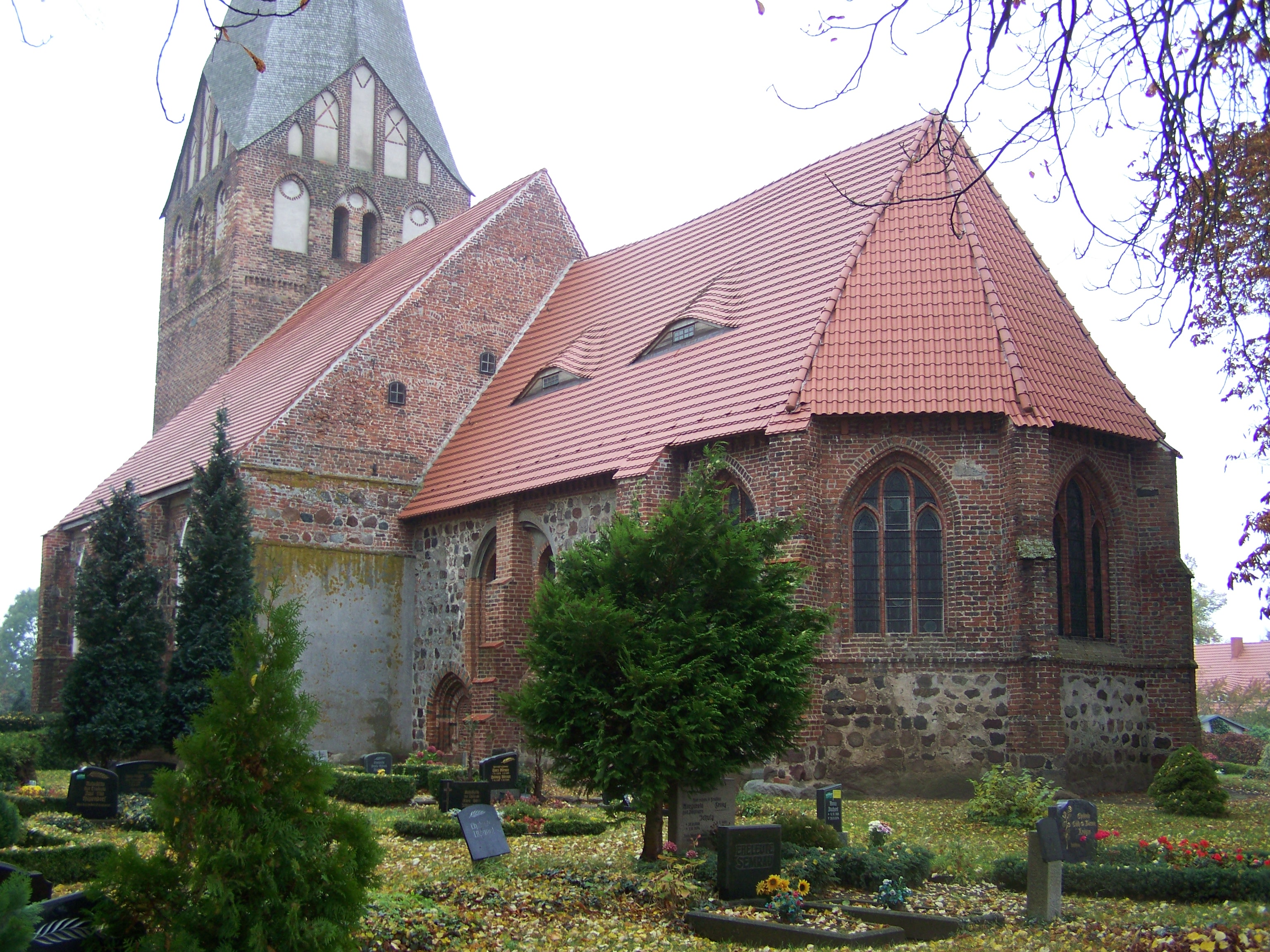
- Wusterhusen village church

- Location of Wusterhusen within Vorpommern-Greifswald district
- Interactive map of Wusterhusen
- Location within Germany Location within Mecklenburg-Vorpommern
- Coordinates: 54°07′N 13°37′E
- Country: Germany
- State: Mecklenburg-Vorpommern
- District: Vorpommern-Greifswald
- Municipal assoc.: Lubmin
- Subdivisions: 5

Government
  - Mayor: Burkhard Köpnick

Area
  - Total: 19.08 km^{2} (7.37 sq mi)
- Elevation: 35 m (115 ft)

Population (2025-12-31)
  - Total: 1,014
  - Density: 53.14/km^{2} (137.6/sq mi)
- Time zone: UTC+01:00 (CET)
  - Summer (DST): UTC+02:00 (CEST)
- Postal codes: 17509
- Dialling codes: 038354
- Vehicle registration: VG
- Website: www.amtlubmin.de

Wusterhusen is a municipality in the Vorpommern-Greifswald district, in Mecklenburg-Vorpommern, Germany.
