= Usedom (town) =

Town in Mecklenburg-Vorpommern, Germany

- Town
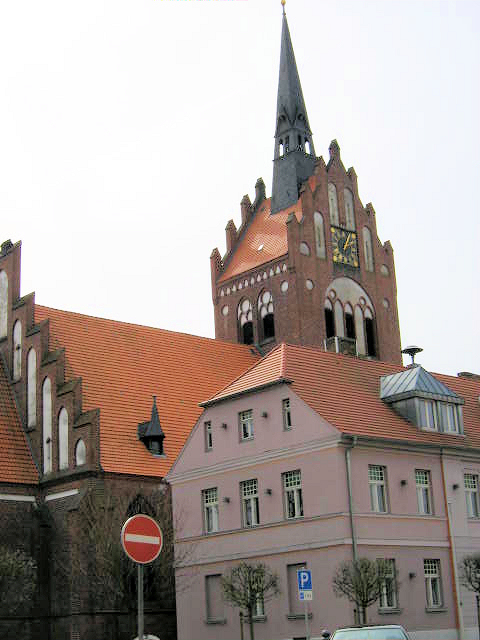
- Church and town hall of Usedom

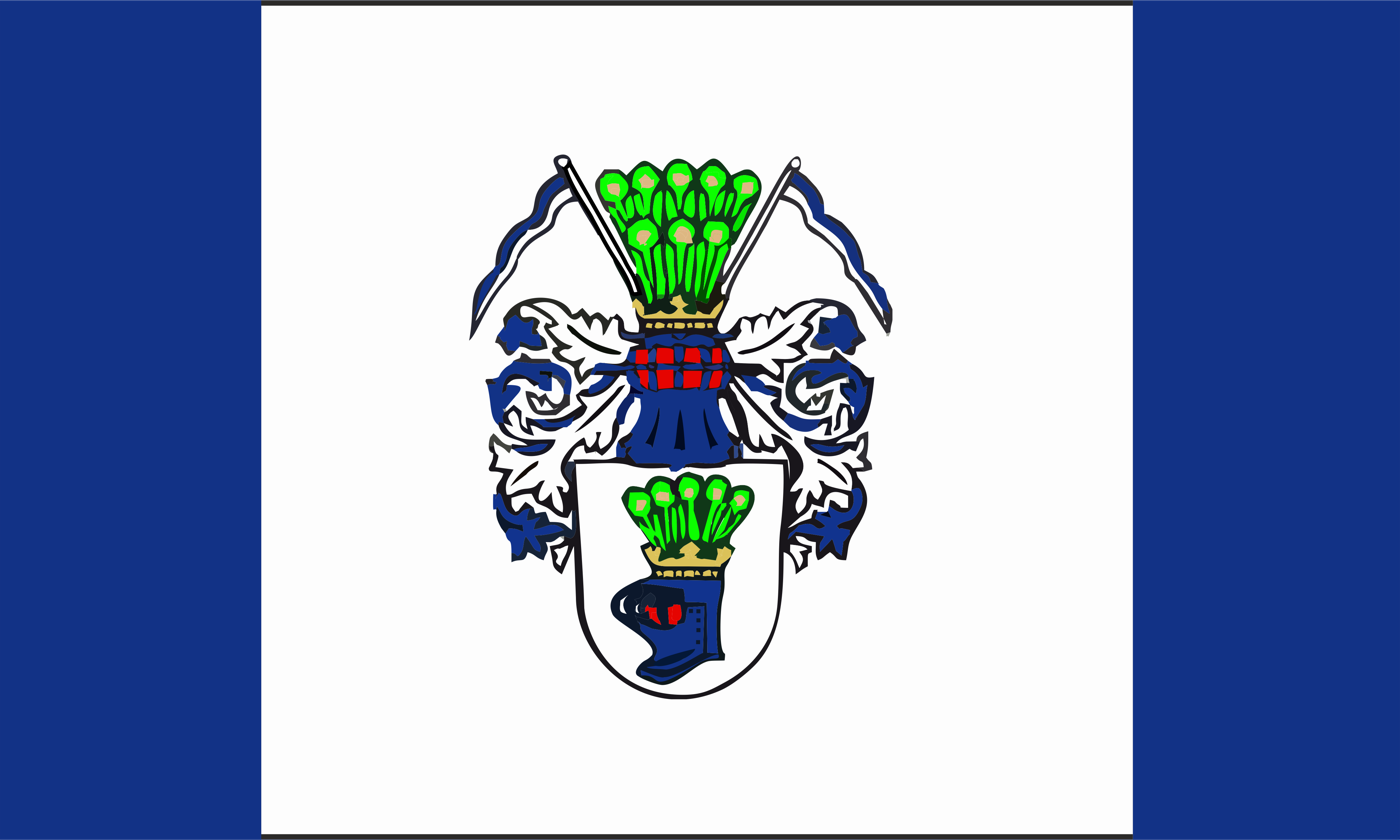
- Flag Coat of arms

- Location of Usedom within Vorpommern-Greifswald district
- Interactive map of Usedom
- Location within Germany Location within Mecklenburg-Vorpommern
- Coordinates: 53°52′N 13°55′E
- Country: Germany
- State: Mecklenburg-Vorpommern
- District: Vorpommern-Greifswald
- Municipal assoc.: Usedom-Süd
- Subdivisions: 14

Government
  - Mayor: Jochen Storrer

Area
  - Total: 38.98 km^{2} (15.05 sq mi)
- Elevation: 0 m (0 ft)

Population (2025-12-31)
  - Total: 1,483
  - Density: 38.05/km^{2} (98.54/sq mi)
- Time zone: UTC+01:00 (CET)
  - Summer (DST): UTC+02:00 (CEST)
- Postal codes: 17406
- Dialling codes: 038372
- Vehicle registration: VG

Usedom (German pronunciation: [ˈuːzədɔm]) is a town on Usedom Island, in the Vorpommern-Greifswald district in Mecklenburg-Vorpommern, in north-eastern Germany, close to the border with Poland. It is the seat of the Amt Usedom-Süd, to which 14 other communities also belong.

The whole island of Usedom was named after the town in medieval times.

== Geography ==
The town lies in the southeastern part of the island of Usedom, in the so-called Achterland, on the northwest shore of the Szczecin Lagoon. The town is bordered on the west and north by the Peenestrom, the aforesaid lagoon's western outlet to the Baltic Sea.

=== Municipality subdivisions ===
The following communities belong to the town of Usedom:

- Gellenthin
- Gneventhin
- Karnin
- Kölpin
- Mönchow
- Ostklüne
- Paske
- Usedom
- Vossberg
- Welzin
- Westklüne
- Wilhelmsfelde
- Wilhelmshof
- Zecherin

== History ==
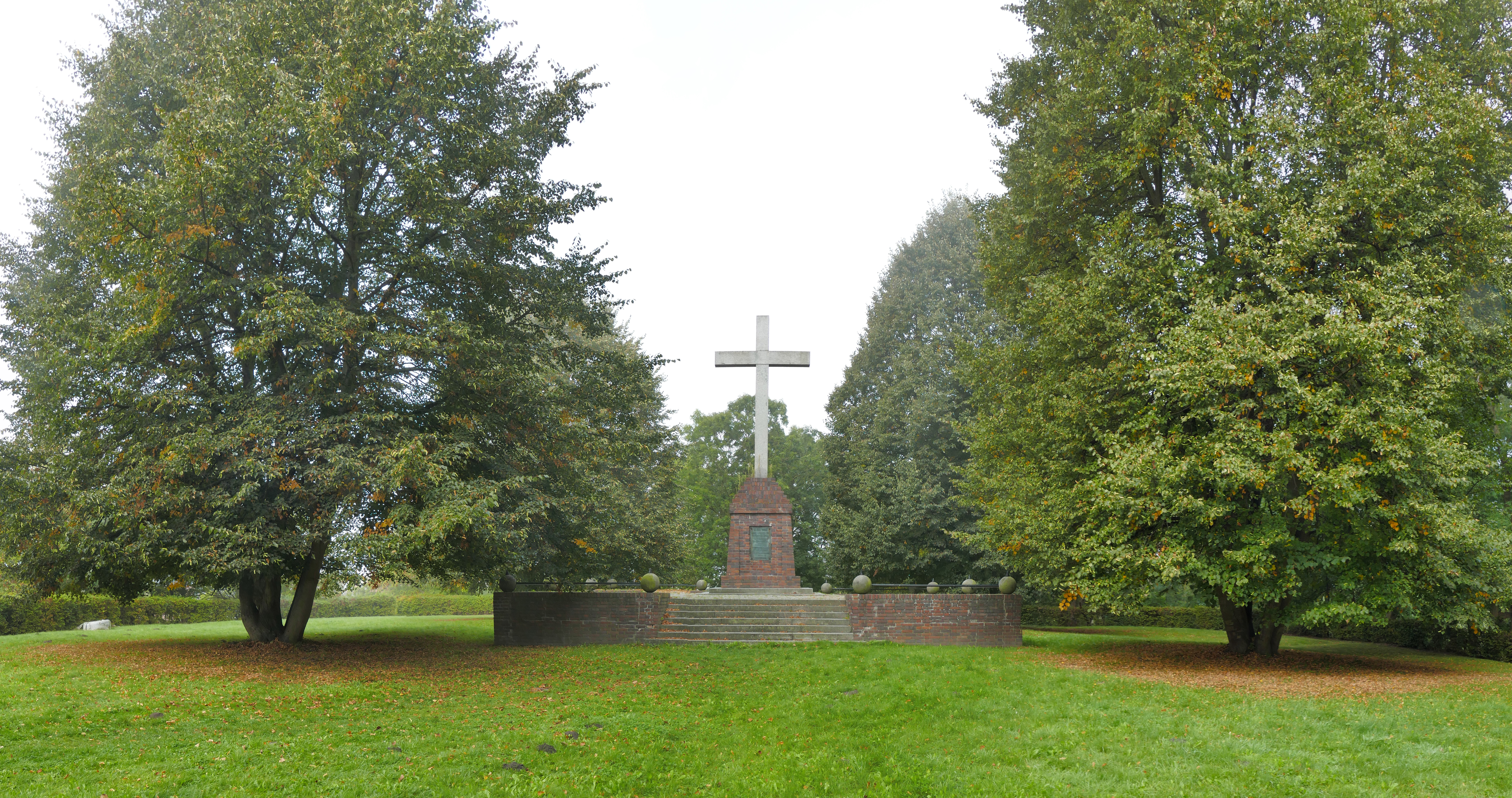
Christianization memorial

The region has been settled since Neolithic times, and from the 8th and 9th centuries by ancient Slavs, who built a castle on the hill now known as the Schloßberg. The town's name comes from the Slavic word "uznam", meaning river mouth. The town was destroyed by the Danes in the 1110s.

In the 1120s, Pomerania was conquered by Polish monarch Bolesław III Wrymouth, who initiated Christianization, entrusting this task to Otto of Bamberg. In 1128, the Slavic West Pomeranian assembly with Duke Wartislaw I adopted Christianity, and shortly thereafter, a Premonstratensian monastery, Usedom Abbey (also Grobe or Pudagla Abbey) was established in Usedom. In 1140 the local castle was first mentioned, as part of the newly established Bishopric of Wolin, and first castellans were mentioned from 1159. In 1177 and 1178 the town was destroyed twice by King Valdemar I of Denmark. In the thirteenth century, the German settlement of Usedom began as part of the eastern colonization (Ostsiedlung) in progress in many places at that time. With the division of the Duchy of Pomerania, in 1295, it became part of the Duchy of Pomerania-Wolgast. On 23 December 1298, Usedom was granted town rights under Lübeck law by Bogusław IV.

The town burnt down twice in great fires in 1475 and 1688. During the Thirty Years' War, it was captured by King Christian IV of Denmark in 1628 and soon handed over to the Holy Roman Empire, then captured by Sweden in 1630, and recaptured by the Holy Roman Empire in 1637. After the Peace of Westphalia (1648) and the Treaty of Stettin (1653), Usedom, along with all of Western Pomerania, became a Dominion of Sweden (Swedish Pomerania) until 1720, when it was acquired by Prussia. In 1757, during the Seven Years' War, it was occupied by Sweden. From 1871, it formed part of the German Empire. The town had a railway connection from 1876.

In 1934, at Karnin, a railway bridge, the Karnin Lift Bridge, was built, but it was destroyed in the Second World War. During the war, it was the location of a subcamp of the Sachsenhausen concentration camp. In February 1945, a German-perpetrated death march of Allied prisoners-of-war from the Stalag XX-B POW camp passed through the town. After the war, the town first belonged to the state of Mecklenburg-Vorpommern until East Germany abolished the Land system in 1952, whereafter it was in the Rostock region. At German reunification in 1990, Usedom once again found itself in the state of Mecklenburg-Vorpommern.

== Sightseeing ==
Points of interest in Usedom include Anklamer Tor ("Anklam Gate"), St. Mary's (Marienkirche), and the Schloßberg, which features a memorial commemorating the conversion to Christianity led by Otto of Bamberg in 1128. The town also contains the ruins of the Karnin Lift Bridge. The town's former railway station houses a nature park center featuring exhibits on the local environment.

== Transport connections ==
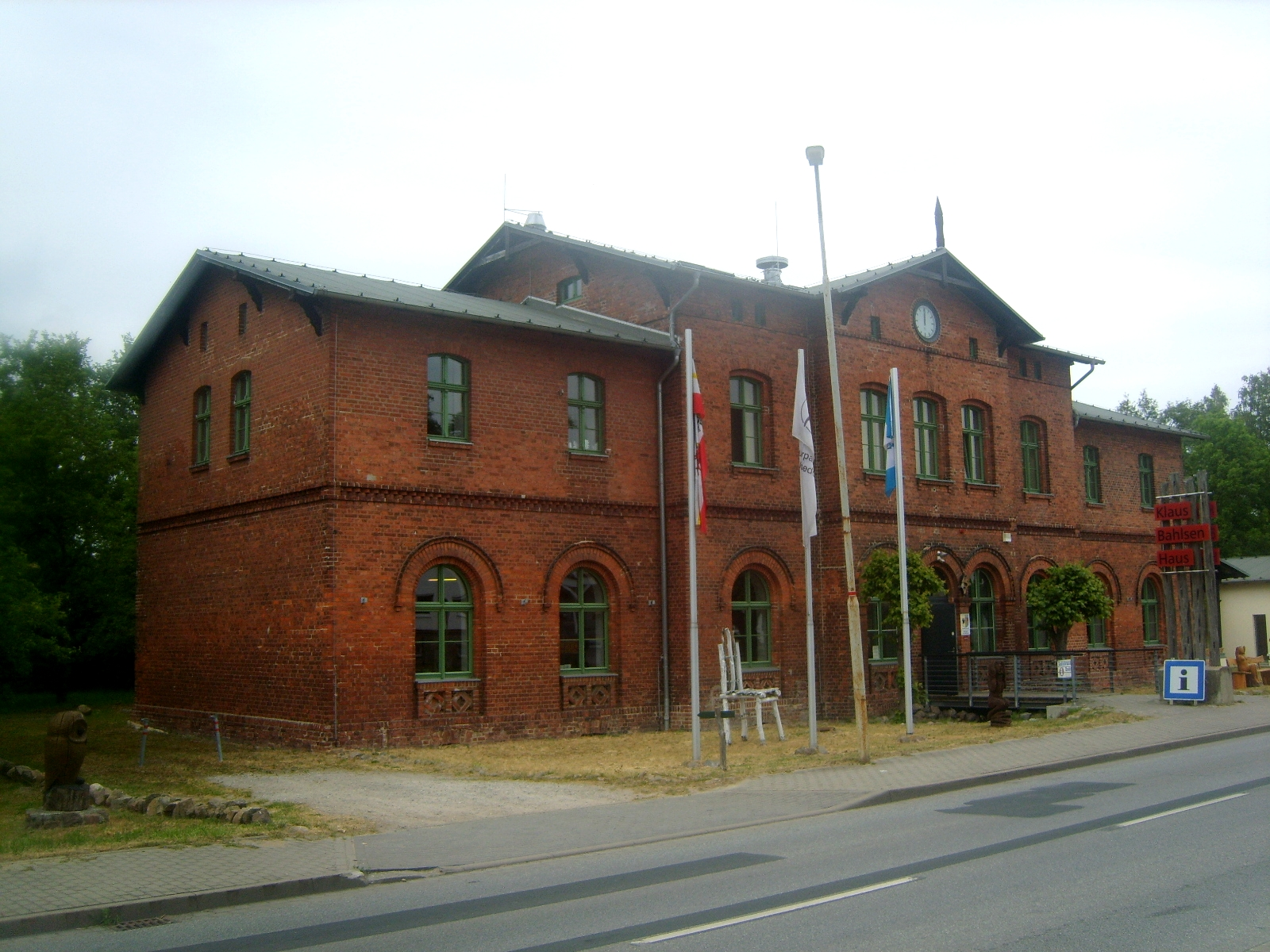
Former railway station

Through Usedom runs the island's main south road (Federal Highway B110), connecting the town to Pinnow on the mainland, and farther afield, Anklam. In the other direction, the B110 joins the B111, the road that runs along Usedom island's north shore, at Seebad Ahlbeck. Until 1945, the town had a railway station on the Ducherow-Swinemünde (Świnoujście) line, which now houses the island's nature park centre. Usedom today lies far from the island's only railway line, (Usedomer Bäderbahn). Usedom has a small harbour on the Usedomer See, an inlet with a narrow opening – the Kehle, or channel – into the lagoon.

== Twin towns – sister cities ==
Usedom is twinned with:

- Henstedt-Ulzburg, Germany
- Maurepas, France
- Wolin, Poland
