= Usedom Abbey =

Coordinates: 53°51′45″N 13°55′34″E

Location of Usedom (town) on Usedom (island) within the Vorpommern-Greifswald district, Mecklenburg-Vorpommern

Location of Pudagla within the Vorpommern-Greifswald district

Usedom Abbey (German: Kloster Usedom) was a medieval Premonstratensian monastery on the isle of Usedom (Western Pomerania, Germany) near the town of Usedom. It was founded in Grobe and later moved to nearby Pudagla, and is thus also known as Grobe Abbey (German: Kloster Grobe) or Pudagla Abbey (German: Kloster Pudagla) respectively.

The abbey was founded by the Pomeranian duke Ratibor I and his wife, Pribislawa, in the course of the conversion of Pomerania to Christianity. The exact foundation date is uncertain, but it is assumed that it was about 1155, after the foundation of Stolpe Abbey in 1153 and before Ratibor's death. The first written record is the confirmation of the abbey by the Pomeranian bishop Adalbert of 8 June 1159, which at the same time is the oldest known Pomeranian document.

The site of Grobe Abbey has been archaeologically determined to be Priesterkamp hill in the town of Usedom. The monks first came from Magdeburg, later from Havelberg. Shortly after its foundation, Grobe Abbey functioned as the temporary seat of the Pomeranian diocese, before its move to Cammin (Kammin, Kamien) in 1175.

In 1307/09, the abbey was relocated to nearby Pudagla. After the Protestant Reformation, the abbey was secularized into a ducal domain, and from the late 16th century was a refuge for ducal widows.

== See also ==
- Conversion of Pomerania
- History of Pomerania
- Pomerania during the High Middle Ages
- Duchy of Pomerania
- Bishopric of Cammin
- List of Christian religious houses in Mecklenburg-Vorpommern
