= Battle of Nakło (1109) =

Battle in Central Europe

Coordinates: 53°8′30″N 17°36′0″E

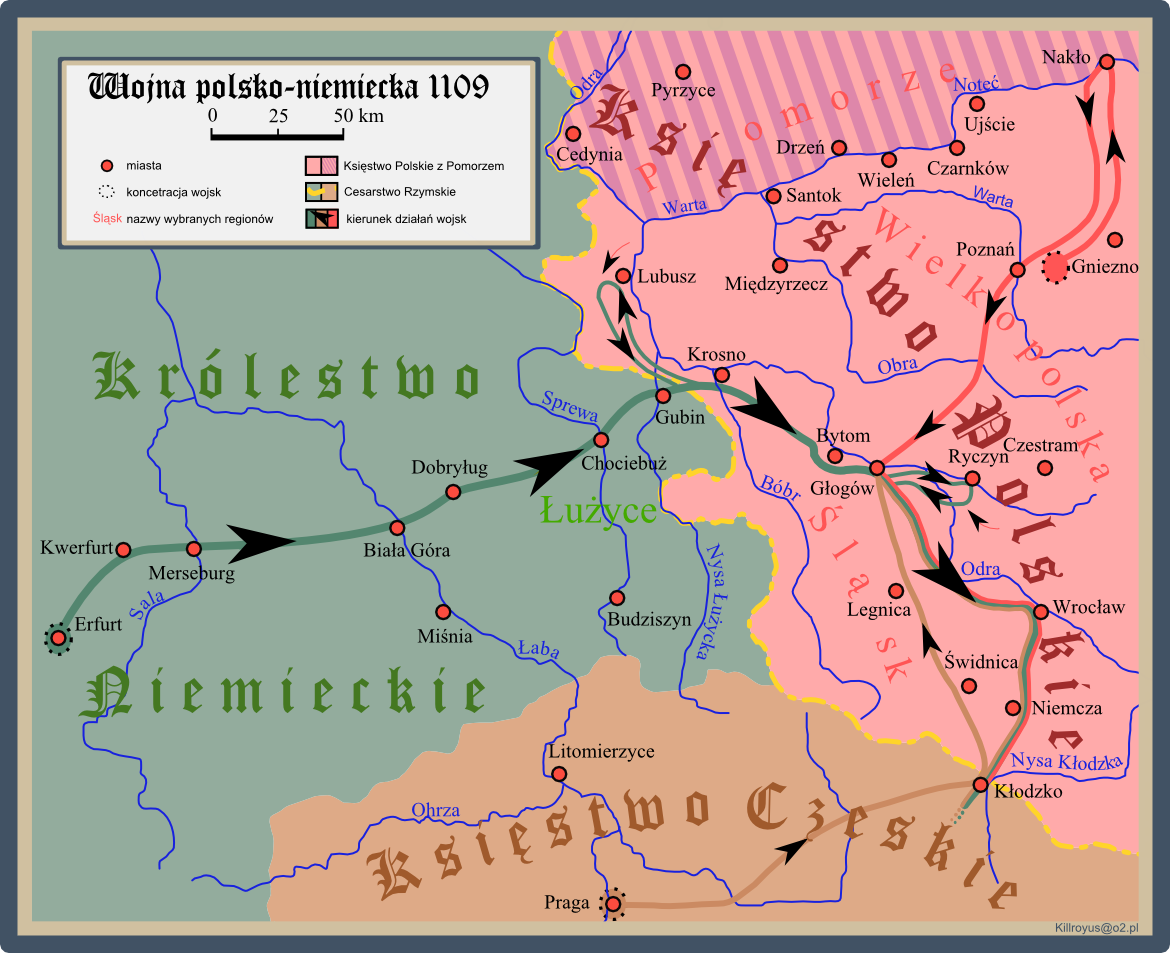
- Campaigns of the 1109 Polish-German conflict
Date	August 10, 1109
Location	Nakło nad Notecią
Result	Polish victory

Belligerents
Kingdom of Poland	Pomeranians

Commanders and leaders
Bolesław III Wrymouth	

Casualties and losses
Few	30,000

The Battle of Nakło (1109) was fought between the forces of the Kingdom of Poland and Pomeranian tribes at Nakło nad Notecią. The Polish troops were led by Duke Bolesław III Wrymouth.

In the summer of 1109 the Polish ruler Bolesław III, an expansionist, led an invasion into Pomerania. The German king Emperor Henry V, incited by Bolesław's half-brother Zbigniew, was about to invade Poland and the Pomeranian raid was a strategic diversion for the upcoming struggle. According to Gallus Anonymus, the purpose of the expedition wasn't just the taking of the castle of Nakło, but forcing the Pomeranians into a decisive battle. Gallus describes the battle in the first chapter of the third book of his chronicle. On 10 August 1109 Bolesław's force, which was besieging Naklo, engaged the Pomeranian relief forces and defeated them. As a result, the city surrendered to him. In Gallus' chronicle, the defeat of the Pomeranians and their conversion to Christianity are presented as one of Bolesław's great achievements, comparable to the victory of King Otto I of Germany over the Hungarians at the 955 Battle of Lechfeld.

Bolesław shortly afterwards had to rush to the south where he met an Imperial army at the Battle of Głogów. He later sent Bishop Otto of Bamberg as a missionary to Christianize Pomerania. Duke Wartislaw I continued to struggle against the imposed Polish overlordship. In 1181 Wartislaw's son Duke Bogislaw I of Pomerania became a vassal of Holy Roman Emperor Frederick Barbarossa.

== Sources ==
- Dalewski, Zbigniew (2008). Ritual and Politics: Writing the History of a Dynastic Conflict in Medieval Poland. Brill.
