= Bishopric of Cammin =

Historic Pomeranian Catholic diocese

Roman Catholic Diocese of Cammin Dioecesis Caminensis Bistum Cammin (in German)
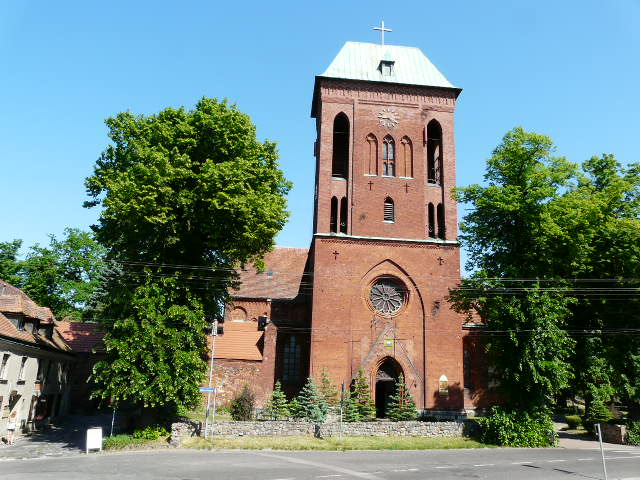
- Former Cathedral of St. John the Baptist, now Co-Cathedral in Kamień Pomorski

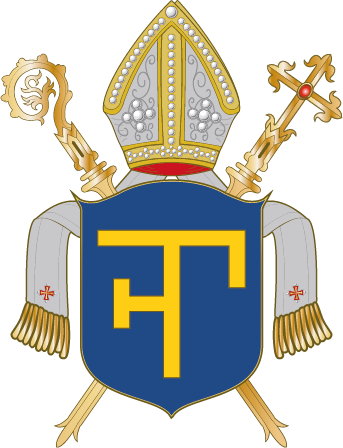
- Coat of arms

Location
- Territory: most of ducal Pomerania, Stift territory, parts of eastern Mecklenburg, of the New March, and of the Uckermark
- Ecclesiastical province: exempt

Information
- Denomination: Roman Catholic
- Rite: Latin Rite
- Established: 14 October 1140 de facto defunct since 1544; 1688 former diocese subject to Nordic Missions Vicariate
- Cathedral: Cammin in Pomerania: Cathedral of St. John the Baptist
- Patron saint: Sabinus of Spoleto; Faustinus of Brescia

Current leadership
- Bishop: last Catholic: Erasmus von Manteuffel

Prince-Bishopric of Cammin Hochstift Cammin^{a}
- 1248–1650
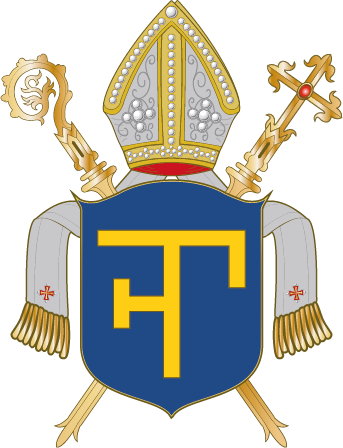
- Coat of arms

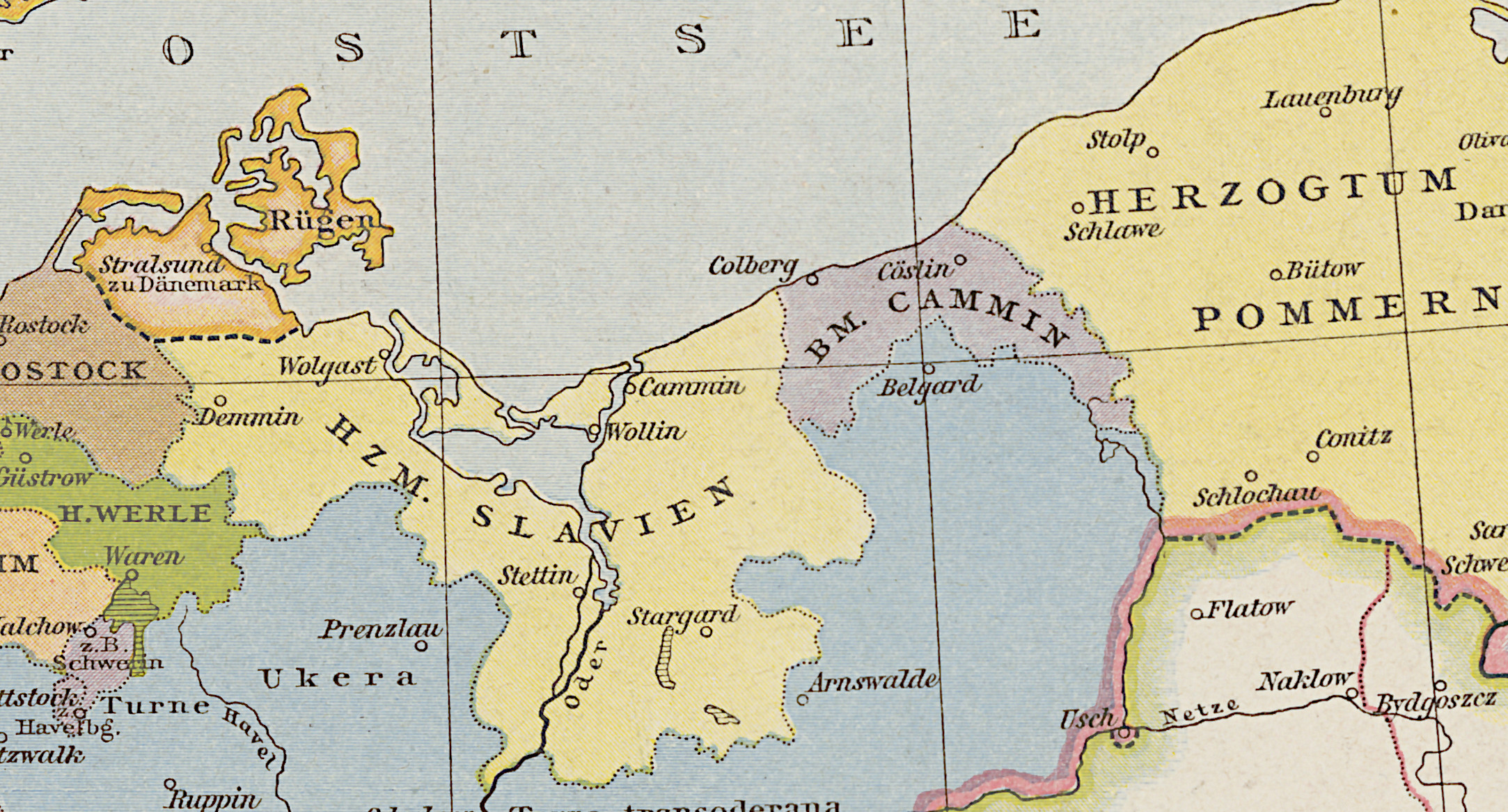
- Territory (violet) about 1250
- Status: Vassal of Holy Roman Empire
- Capital: Wolin, see till ~1150; Usedom Abbey, see till 1175 then Cammin, see & chapter Kolberg, bishop's residence as of 1276; Köslin, Stift government
- Common languages: Official: German; Unofficial: Pomeranian, Kashubian
- Religion: Catholic till 1544, then Lutheran
- Government: Elective monarchy, ruled by the prince-bishop or administrator holding the see, elected by the chapter or, exceptionally, appointed by the Pope
- Prince-bishop, administrator, or chapter (in vacancy)
  - 1394–1398: Prince-Bishop John III
  - 1479: Prince-Bishop Nicolaus
  - 1574–1602: Administrator Casimir
  - 1637–1650: Admin. Ernest Bogislaw
- Legislature: bishop, chapter and Stift estates
- Historical era: High Middle Ages to Early modern period
  - Cammin Diocese est.: 1140
  - Bishop gained rule in temporalities near Kolberg: 1248
  - acquired imperial immediacy: 1345, 1417 (conf.)
  - joined Upper Saxon Circle: 1512
  - immediacy confirmed: 1521, and 1542
  - autonomy waived, Pomeranian fief: 1544
  - seized by Brandenburg: 1650
  - merged in Pomerania Province: 1653
Preceded by	Succeeded by
Duchy of Pomerania	Province of Pomerania (1653–1815)
- Today part of: Poland

The Bishopric of Cammin (also Kammin, Kamień Pomorski) was both a former Roman Catholic diocese in the Duchy of Pomerania from 1140 to 1544, and a secular territory of the Holy Roman Empire (Prince-Bishopric) in the Kołobrzeg area from 1248 to 1650.

The diocese comprised the areas controlled by the House of Pomerania in the 12th century, thus differing from the later territory of the Duchy of Pomerania by the exclusion of the Principality of Rügen and inclusion of Circipania, Mecklenburg-Strelitz, and the northern Uckermark and New March. The diocese was rooted in the Conversion of Pomerania by Otto of Bamberg in 1124 and 1128 at the behest of Polish ruler Bolesław III Wrymouth, and was dissolved during the Protestant Reformation, when the Pomeranian nobility adopted Lutheranism in 1534 and the last pre-reformatory bishop died in 1544. The Catholic diocese was succeeded by the Pomeranian Evangelical Church and suppressed until 1945, when its new incarnation, the Apostolic Administration of Kamień, Lubusz and the Prelature of Piła was re-established, succeeded by the Diocese of Szczecin-Kamień in 1972, elevated to Archdiocese of Szczecin-Kamień in 1992.

From west to east, the diocese bordered the dioceses of Schwerin, Havelberg, Brandenburg, Lubusz, Poznań, Gniezno and Włocławek.

The cathedral complex in Kamień Pomorski is listed as a Historic Monument of Poland.

== History ==
=== Christianisation ===
In 1000, the Diocese of Kołobrzeg was founded by Polish monarch Bolesław I the Brave, covering ecclesiastical authority over the region of Pomerania. Later on, it was suppressed, and the ecclesiastical authority was held by the Archdiocese of Gniezno.

After Duke Bolesław III Wrymouth of Poland had conquered Pomerania until 1121/22, Saint Otto of Bamberg between 1124 and 1128 Christianised the area. Otto's first mission in 1124 followed a failed mission by eremite Bernard in 1122, and was initiated by Bolesław with the approval of both Lothair III, Holy Roman Emperor, and Pope Callixtus II. Otto's second mission in 1128 was initiated by Lothair after a pagan reaction. Wartislaw I, Duke of Pomerania supported and aided both missions. Between the missions, he had expanded his duchy westward, up to Güstrow. These former Lutician areas were not subject to Polish overlordship, but claimed by the Holy Roman Empire. Otto during his lifetime did not succeed in founding a diocese, caused by a conflict of the archbishops of Magdeburg and Gniezno about ecclesiastical hegemony in the area. Otto died in 1139.

=== Establishment and early history ===
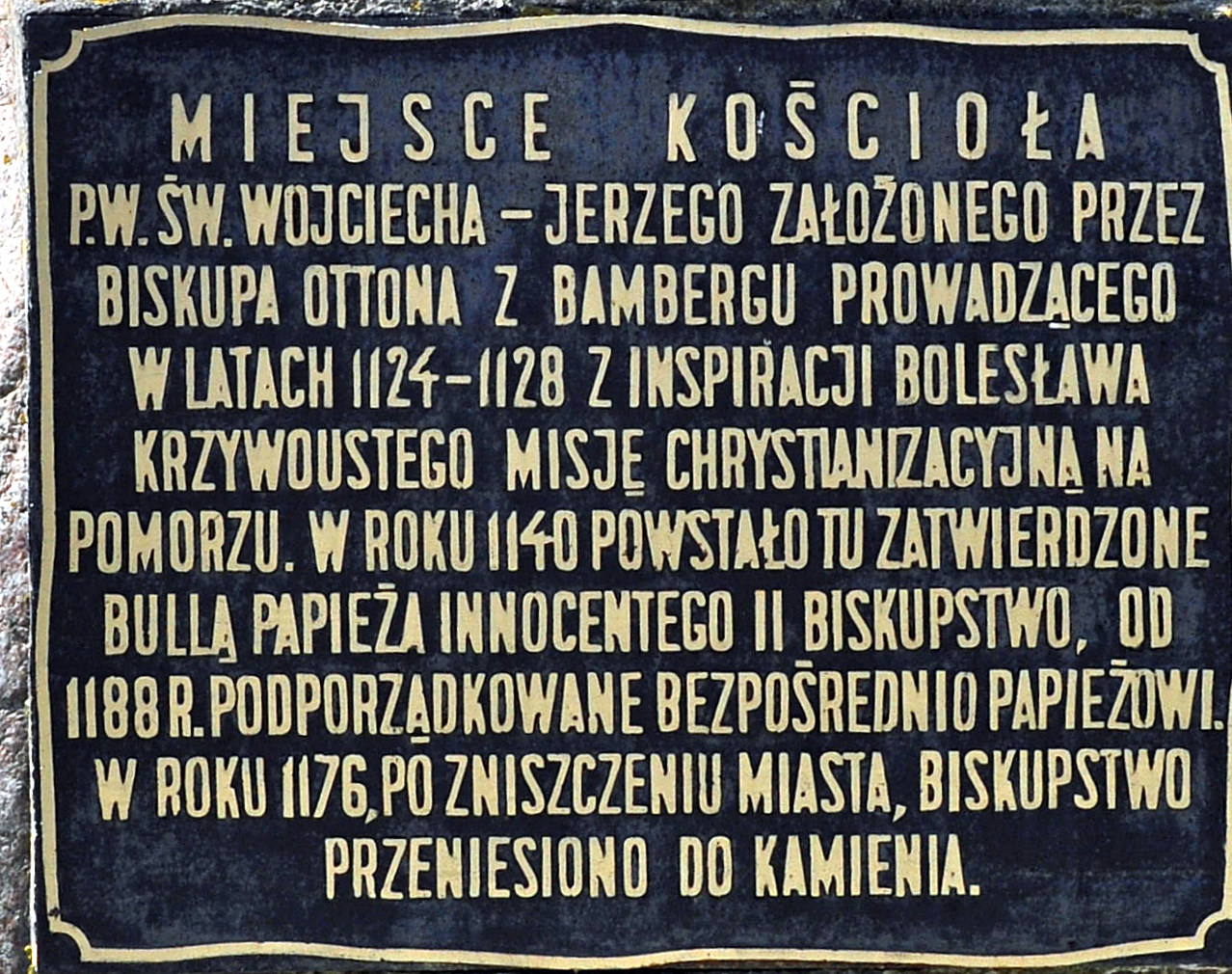
Plaque at the site of the first cathedral in Wolin

Pope Innocent II founded the diocese by a papal bull of 14 October 1140, and made the church of St. Adalbert at Wolin on Wolin island the see of the diocese. In the bull, the new diocese was placed "under the protection of the see of the Holy Peter", thwarting ambitions of the archbishops of Magdeburg and Gniezno, who both wanted to incorporate the new diocese as suffragan into their archdioceses. Adalbert, a former chaplain of Saint Otto who had participated in Otto's mission as an interpreter and assistant, was consecrated bishop at Rome. Adalbert and Ratibor I founded Stolpe Abbey at the side of Wartislaw I's assassination by a pagan in 1153, the first monastery in Pomerania.

The bishops held the title of Pomeranorum or Pomeranorum et Leuticorum episcopus, referring to the tribal territories of the Pomeranians and Luticians merged in the Duchy of Pomerania.

In the late 12th century the territory of the Griffin dukes was raided several times by Saxon troops of Henry the Lion and Danish forces under King Valdemar I. The initial see of in Wolin was moved to Grobe Abbey on the island of Usedom after 1150. At the same time Wolin economically decayed and was devastated by Danish expeditions, which contributed to the move to Grobe. The see was again moved to Cammin, now Kamień Pomorski, in 1175, where a chapter was founded for the Cathedral of St. John the Baptist. All this time, the question of subordinance of the Pomeranian diocese as suffragan to an archdiocese remained unsolved. Since 1188, when the pope accepted the move of the see, the bishopric was referred to as "Roman Catholic Diocese of Cammin", while before it was addressed as Pomeranensis ecclesia, Pomeranian diocese. The pope furthermore placed the bishopric as an exempt diocese directly under the Holy See. Since 1208, the bishops held the title Caminensis episcopus.

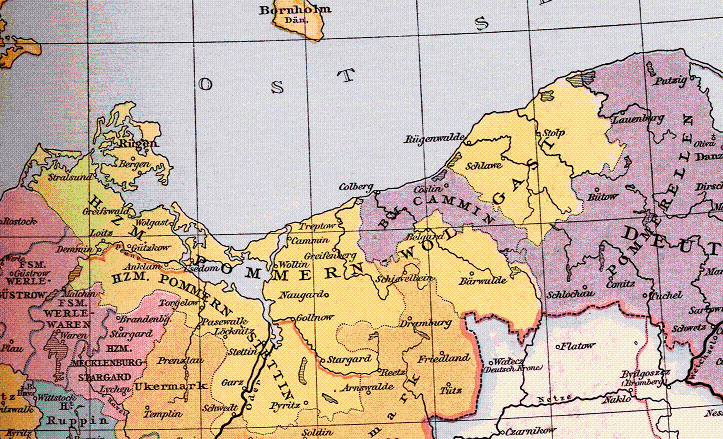
The Duchy of Pomerania (yellow) in 1400, P.-Stettin and P.-Wolgast are indicated; purple: Secular area of the Cammin bishopric (BM. Cammin) and Teutonic Prussia; orange: Margraviate of Brandenburg; pink: duchies of Mecklenburg

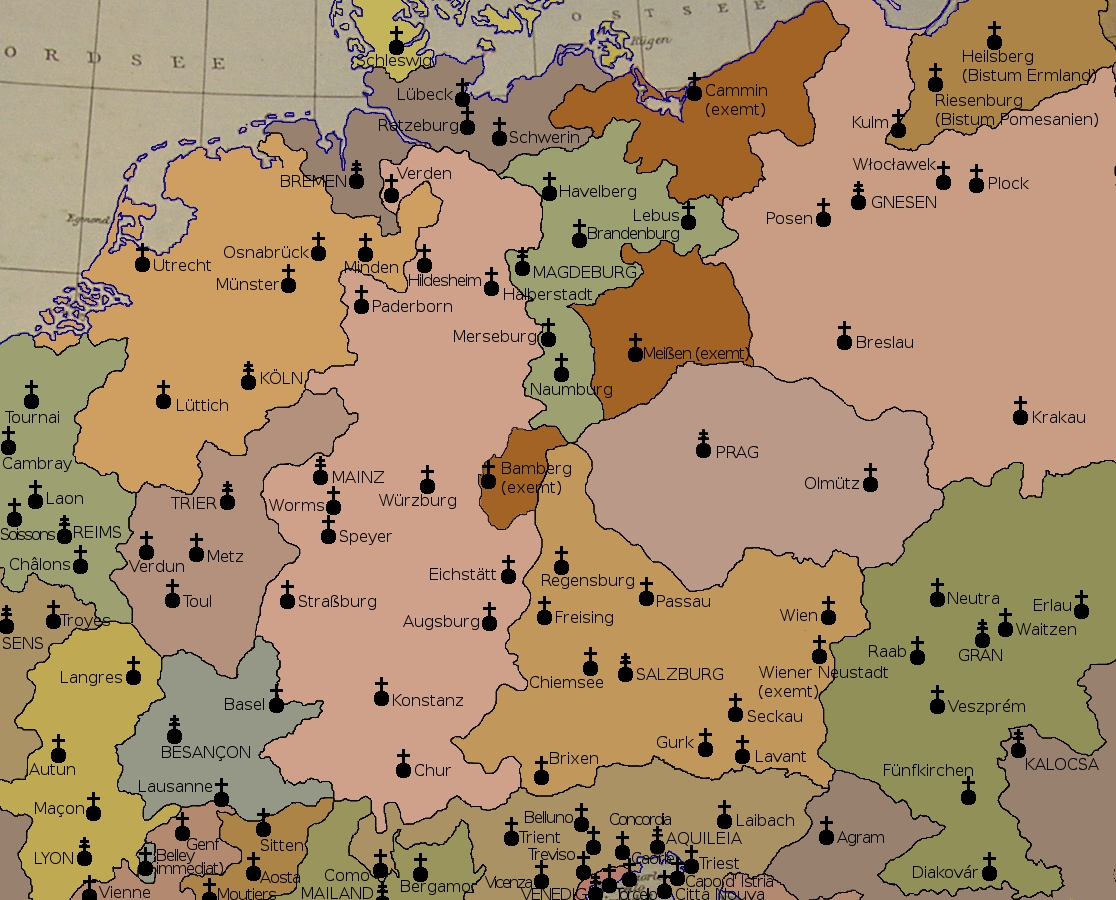
Church provinces in 1500, Bishopric of Cammin shown in brown.

The area of the diocese resembled the area controlled by Wartislaw I and his brother and successor, Ratibor I. The northern border was defined by the coastline and the border with the Principality of Rügen (Ryck river). In the West, the diocese included Circipania up to Güstrow. In the Southwest, the border of the diocese ran south to a line Güstrow-Ivenack-Altentreptow in a near straight west–east orientation, then took a sharp southward turn west of Ueckermünde to include Prenzlau. The border then turned east to meet the Oder river south of Gartz and followed the Oder to the Warta confluence to include Cedynia. In the South, the diocese border ran immediately north of the Warthe to include Gorzów and Myślibórz. The southeastern border left the Warthe area with a sharp turn running straight north to Drawsko Pomorskie, then turned eastwards south of the town to include Czaplinek. Then, after a southeast turn, it turned northeast towards Bytów. The eastern border ran east of Bytów and west of Lębork to meet the seacoast east of Rowokół.

When Emperor Frederick I Barbarossa deposed Henry the Lion in 1180 he granted Pomerania under Bogislaw I the status of an Imperial duchy, but from 1185 it was a Danish fief until the 1227 Battle of Bornhöved. In 1248, the Cammin bishops and the Pomeranian dukes had interchanged the terrae Stargard and Kolberg, leaving the bishops in charge of the latter. In the following, the bishops extended their secular reign which soon comprised the Kolberg (now Kołobrzeg), Köslin (also Cöslin, now Koszalin) and Bublitz (now Bobolice) areas. In 1266 a Legate Synod was convened in Magdeburg where the Apostolic Legate Cardinal Guy of Burgundy had to call a dispute between the diocese of Cammin and that of Lübeck regarding the right for collecting tithes in neighboring lands. When in 1276 they became the sovereign of the town of Kolberg also, they moved their residence there. Bishop Hermann von Gleichen granted town rights to Köslin (Koszalin) in 1266 and Massow (Maszewo) in 1278. The administration of the episcopal secular state was done from Köslin.

In the early 13th century, the Słupsk and Sławno lands passed to the Archdiocese of Gniezno, only to return to the Diocese of Kamień in 1317.

=== Prince-Bishopric ===
The bishops at multiple occasions tried to exclude their secular reign from ducal overlordship by applying for Imperial immediacy. The Pomeranian dukes successfully forestalled these ambitions, and immediacy was granted only temporarily in 1345. The addition of secular territory would be the basis for later turning the status of the diocese into a prince-bishopric. The episcopal territory of secular reign remained a subfief of ducal Pomerania, and did not become an immediately imperial fief.

The Protestant Reformation reached Pomerania in the early 16th century, mostly starting from the cities, and Lutheranism was made the Duchy of Pomerania's religion in 1534 by the diet of Treptow upo Rega (Trzebiatów). The Pomeranian reformator Johannes Bugenhagen, appointed bishop of Cammin by 1544, did not assume the office, the cathedral chapter elected instead Bartholomaeus Swawe, the former chancellor of Duke Barnim XI of Pomerania-Stettin, who promptly renounced Cammin's imperial immediacy. From 1556 on the Griffin dukes held also the office of a titular bishop ruling in Cammin's secular territory. In 1650 the last bishop Ernst Bogislaw von Croÿ resigned and the diocese was secularised. With Farther Pomerania it fell to Brandenburg-Prussia forming its Province of Pomerania.

The secular territory of the former diocese continued to exist as a prince-bishopric and principality within the Duchy of Pomerania, and was dissolved in 1650 when it fell to Brandenburg-Prussia, becoming part of Brandenburgian Pomerania. The area of the former principality was administered as Fürstenthum county within the Prussian Province of Pomerania until its division in 1872.

== Bishops ==
=== Early bishops ===
- 1140–1162: Adalbert of Pomerania
- 1163–1186: Conrad I of Salzwedel
- 1186–1202: Siegfried I
- 1202–1219: Siegwin
- 1219–1223: Conrad II von Demmin
- 1223–1245: Conrad III von Gützkow

=== Prince-Bishops ===
- 1245–1252: Wilhelm
- 1252–1288: Hermann von Gleichen
- 1288–1298: Jaromar Prince of Rugia (son of Prince Vitslav II)
- 1298: Peter
- 1299–1317?: Heinrich von Wachholz
- 1317?–1324: Conrad IV
- 1324–1329: Wilhelm II
  - 1324–1326: Otto (anti-bishop)
  - 1326–1329: Arnold von Eltz (anti-bishop)
- 1329–1343: Friedrich von Eickstedt
- 1344–1372: John I of Saxe-Lauenburg, son of Eric I, Duke of Saxe-Lauenburg
- 1372–1385: Philipp von Rehberg
- 1386–1394: John II Wilken von Kosselyn
  - 1386–1392: Bogislaw VIII, Duke of Pomerania, diocesan administrator, ruling Pomerania-Stargard 1377–1417
- 1394–1398: Bogislaw VIII, Duke of Pomerania, bishop elect, rivalling John III
- 1394–1398: John III Kropidło, Duke of Opole-Strzelce, rivalling Bogislaw VIII
- 1398–1410: Nikolaus Bock
- 1410–1424: Magnus of Saxe-Lauenburg, prince-bishop of Hildesheim, 1424–1452
- 1424–1449: Siegfried II von Bock
- 1449–1469: Henning Iwen
- 1449–1471: sede vacante
- 1471: Henning Kessebogen
- 1471–1479: Count Ludwig von Eberstein-Naugard
- 1479: Nicolaus von Tüngen, also Prince-Bishop of Warmia 1467–1489
- 1479–1482: Marinus Freganus
- 1482–1485: Angelo Geraldini, also Bishop of Sessa Aurunca 1462–1486
- 1486–1498: Benedikt von Waldstein
  - 1486–1488: Nikolaus Westphal, diocesan administrator
- 1499–1521: Martin Karith
- 1521–1544: Erasmus von Manteuffel-Arnhausen, after 1532 he lost influence in the diocesan territory except of the episcopal secular area around Kolberg

=== Lutheran Bishops and Superintendents ===
- 1544–1549: Bartholomaeus Suawe, bishop, only for the Lutheran state church in the secular episcopal area
- 1549–1556: Martin Weiher von Leba (de), bishop, only for the Lutheran state church in the secular episcopal area
- 1556–1558: vacancy, the succeeding administrators, colloquially called bishops, lacked any theological skills
- 1558–1567: Georg Venetus, Stiftssuperintendent (i.e. superintendent of the Hochstift/prince-bishopric)
- 1568–1602: Petrus Edeling, superintendent of the prince-bishopric
- 1605–1620: Adam Hamel, superintendent of the prince-bishopric
- 1622–1645: Immanuel König, superintendent of the prince-bishopric

=== Pomeranian Prince-Administrators ("Bishops") ===
- 1556–1574: John Frederick, Duke of Pomerania, † 1600
- 1574–1602: Casimir IX, Duke of Pomerania-Wolgast, † 1605
- 1602–1618: Francis, Duke of Pomerania-Barth, † 1620
- 1618–1623: Ulrich, Duke of Pomerania-Barth
- 1623–1637: Bogislaw XIV, Duke of Pomerania
- 1637–1650: Ernst Bogislaw von Croÿ, Prince of Croÿ, † 1684

== See also ==
- Roman Catholic Archdiocese of Szczecin-Kamień
- Roman Catholic Diocese of Koszalin-Kołobrzeg
