= Adalbert of Pomerania =

Adalbert of Pomerania (German: Adalbert or Albert von Pommern, Polish: Wojciech I) (born before 1124; died 1162) was the first bishop of the 12th century Pomeranian bishopric, with its see in Wolin (also Jumne, Julin). He was a monk of the Michaelsberg Abbey, Bamberg and former chaplain to Bolesław III Wrymouth of Poland, whence he knew the Pomeranian language of the temporarily Polish-subjugated West Slavic population, whereas the Joms Vikings and other Germanic inhabitants of the Pomeranian coast understood his old German language.

== Life ==
Adalbert participated in the conversion of the pagan inhabitants of Pomerania (Lutici and Slavic Pomeranians) during the missionary expeditions of Otto of Bamberg in 1124 and 1128, when he aided Otto as his assistant and interpreter. Adalbert is assumed to be of Polish origin.

The territory was put under the jurisdiction of the archbishopric of Magdeburg by Holy Roman emperor Otto I, King of Germany. In 1133 the Magdeburg archbishop Saint Norbert received verification by the pope of his jurisdiction over a number of dioceses, including those in Pomerania. However, bishop Otto of Bamberg had actually baptized the Pomeranians and therefore thought to add it to his southern Bamberg archdiocese and in order to avoid conflicts, pope Innocent II exempted the Pomeranian bishopric(s).

Otto did not succeed during his lifetime in founding a diocese, due to a conflict between the archbishops of Magdeburg and Gniezno about ecclesiastical hegemony in the area. Pope Innocent II founded the diocese by a papal bull of 14 October 1140, and made the church of St. Adalbert at (Julin (Wollin/Wolin) on Wollin/Wolin island the see of the diocese. In the bull, the new diocese was placed "under the protection of the see of the Holy Peter", thwarting ambitions of the archbishops of Magdeburg and Gniezno, who both wanted to incorporate the new diocese as suffragan into their archdioceses.

Otto had recommended his chaplain Adalbert as bishop, which was supported by Ratibor I, Duke of Pomerania. Adalbert was consecrated bishop at Rome. Adalbert and Ratibor I founded Stolpe Abbey at the side of Wartislaw I's assassination by a pagan in 1153, the first monastery in Pomerania. The new foundation was occupied by monks from Berge Abbey near Magdeburg and all churches to be built in the future were subordinated to it.

In 1147, the Wendish Crusade, a campaign of the Northern Crusades, was mounted by bishops and nobles of the Holy Roman Empire. The crusaders pillaged the land and besieged Demmin and Szczecin despite the fact that both towns were (officially) Christian already. Adalbert took part in the negotiations that finally led to the lifting of the Szczecin siege by the crusaders.

After the death of Duke Ratibor I, Adalbert received the same support from his two nephews, Dukes Bogislaw I and Kasimir I. His last act was the confirmation of the richly gifted Grobe Monastery near Usedom, founded by Ratibor I, on 8 June 1159.

When Wolin was destroyed by Danes in the late 12th century, the diocese was moved to Cammin (also Kammin, now Kamień Pomorski ); this bishopric became known as the Roman Catholic Diocese of Kammin.
