= Christianization of Pomerania =

Medieval Pomerania was converted from Slavic paganism to Christianity under Bolesław III Wrymouth, by bishop Otto of Bamberg in 1124 and 1128 (Duchy of Pomerania), and in 1168 by Absalon (Principality of Rügen).

Earlier attempts at Christianization, undertaken since the 10th century, failed or were short-lived. The new religion stabilized when the Pomeranian dukes founded several monasteries and called in Christian, primarily German settlers during the Ostsiedlung. The first Pomeranian abbey was founded in 1153 at the site where the first Christian duke of Pomerania, Wartislaw I, was slain by a pagan. The Duchy of Pomerania was organized by the Roman Catholic Church in the Bishopric of Cammin in 1140. Pomeranian areas not belonging to the duchy at this time were attached to the dioceses of Włocławek (East), Roskilde (Rügen) and Schwerin (West).

== Bishopric of Havelberg (948-983) ==
When the Bishopric of Havelberg was founded in 948, the constitution document mentions the area between Peene and Oder among the bishopric's belongings. In 983, the Holy Roman Empire lost control over the region due to a Slavic uprising.

== Diocese of Kolobrzeg (Kolberg, 1000–1005) ==
The first Polish duke Mieszko I invaded Pomerania and subdued the gard of Kołobrzeg (Kolberg) and the adjacent areas in the 960s. He also fought the Wolinians, but despite a won battle in 967, he did not succeed in the town of Wolin itself. His son and successor Boleslaw I continued to campaign in Pomerania, but also failed to subdue the Wolinians and the lower Oder areas.

During the Congress of Gniezno in 1000, Boleslaw created the first, yet short-lived, bishopric in Pomerania Diocese of Kołobrzeg, subordinate to the Archdiocese of Gniezno, headed by Saxon bishop Reinbern, which was destroyed when Pomeranians revolted in 1005. Of all Lutici, the Wolinians were especially devoted to participation in the wars between the Holy Roman Empire and Poland from 1002 to 1018 to prevent Bolesław I the Brave from reinstating his rule in Pomerania.

== Failed mission of Günther (1017) ==
In 1017, a priest called Günther tried to convert the inhabitants of Vorpommern; the mission was not successful.

== Failed mission of Bernard (1122) ==
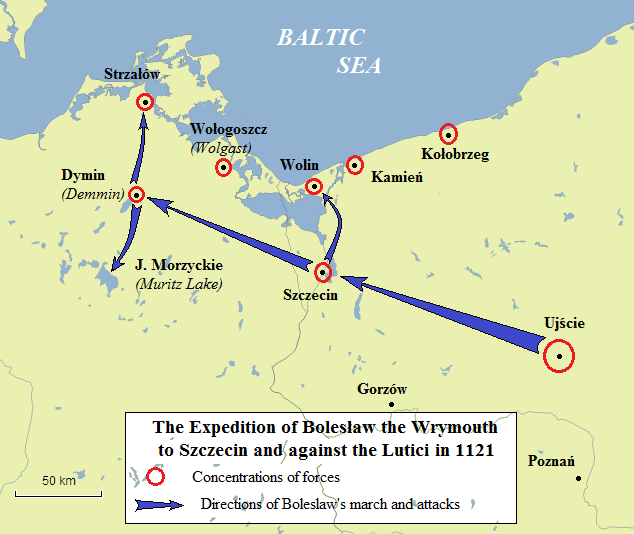
The expedition of Boleslaw III of Poland to Szczecin and west of the Oder to subjugate the Slavic Lutici, in 1121. The conquest paved the way for the Christianization of Pomerania by Otto of Bramberg, sent by Boleslaw.

Another attempt was made following the subjugation of Pomerania by Boleslaw III of Poland. In 1122, Spanish monk Bernard (also Bernhard) traveled to Jumne (Wolin), accompanied only by his chaplain and an interpreter. The Pomeranians, however, were not impressed by his missionary efforts and finally threw him out of town.

Bernard was later made bishop of Lebus.

== Otto of Bamberg (1124/1128) ==
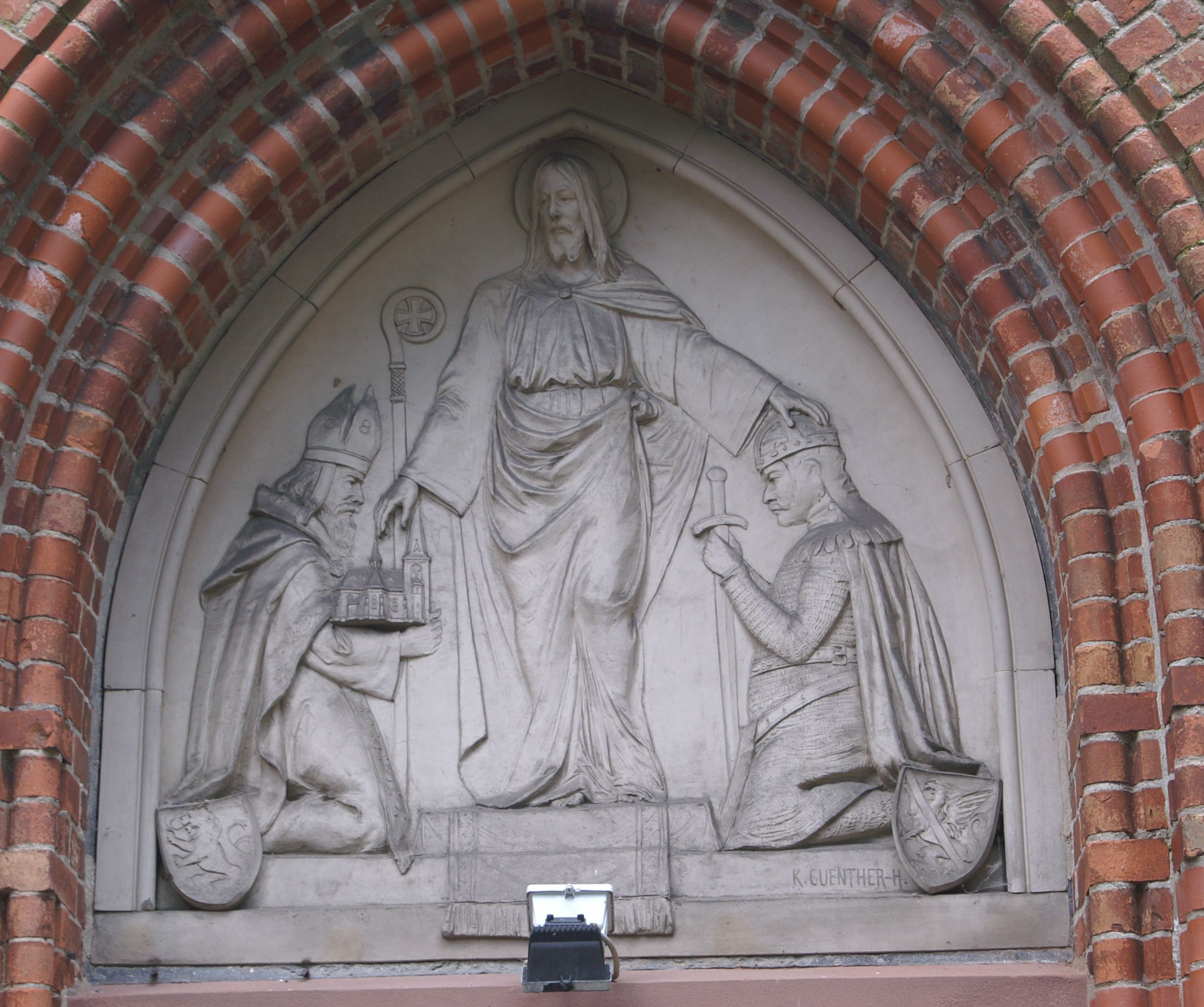
Conversion of Pomerania, depicted in Stolpe's Wartislaw Memorial Church

After Bernard's failure, Boleslaw III asked Otto of Bamberg to convert Pomerania to Christianity, which he accomplished in his first visit in 1124/25. Otto's strategy differed markedly from the one Bernard used: While Bernard traveled alone and as a poor and unknown priest, Otto, a wealthy and famous man, was accompanied by 20 clergy of his own diocese, numerous servants, and 60 warriors supplied to him by Boleslaw, and carried with him numerous supplies and gifts. Otto arrived in Pyritz, and the fact that he was already wealthy assured the Pomeranians that his aim was only to convert them to Christianity, not to become wealthy at the expense of the Pomeranian people. He persuaded the Pomeranians that their conversion would protect them from further punishment by his God, which was how the devastating Polish conquest was depicted. This approach turned out to be successful, and was backed by parts of the Pomeranian nobility who had already been raised as Christians, like Duke Wartislaw I, who encouraged and promoted Otto's mission. Many Pomeranians had already been baptized in Pyritz and also in the other burghs Otto visited.

Timeline of Otto von Bamberg's first mission
Date	Event
May 1124	Otto von Bamberg arrives in Pomerania via the Zantoch stronghold.
5 or 6 June 1124	first baptism in Pomerania
8 June 1124	arrival in Pyrzyce
18/19 June 1124	first baptism in Pyrzyce
24 June - mid-September 1124	mission in Kamień Pomorski
eight days in late September 1124	mission in and around Wolin
nine weeks since early October 1124	mission in Szczecin
mid-December 1124	mission in Gartz, Lubin, return to Szczecin, return to Wolin
late January and early February 1125	return to Kammin, mission in Cloden, Kołobrzeg and Białogard
11 February 1125	Otto von Bamberg enters the woodlands between Pomerania and Greater Poland
15 February 1125 or later	Otto arrives in Usch and proceeds towards Gniezno

Otto of Bamberg returned on 19 April 1128, this time invited by duke Wartislaw I himself, aided by the emperor Holy Roman Emperor Lothar II, to convert the Slavs of Western Pomerania just incorporated into the Pomeranian duchy, and to strengthen the Christian faith of the inhabitants of Stettin and Wollin, who fell back into heathen practices and idolatry. Otto this time visited primarily Western Pomeranian burghs, had the temples of Gützkow and Wolgast torn down and on their sites erected the predecessors of today's St Nikolai and St Petri churches, respectively. The nobility assembled in a congress in Usedom, where they accepted Christianity on June 10, 1128. Otto then was titled apostolus gentis Pomeranorum, made a saint by pope Clement III in 1189, and was worshipped in Pomerania even after the Protestant Reformation. Otto aborted the mission in November 1128 on behalf of the emperor, after he had sought to mediate the conflicts between the Pomeranian and Polish dukes.

Adalbert of Pomerania, the later Pomeranian bishop, participated in Otto's mission as an interpreter and assistant.

== Pomeranian dioceses ==
=== Diocese of Kammin (Cammin, 1140) ===
On Otto of Bamberg's behalf, a diocese was founded with the see in Wollin (Julin, Jumne, Vineta), a major Slavic and Viking town in the Oder estituary. On October 14, 1140, Adalbert of Pomerania was made the first Bishop by Pope Innocent II. Otto however had died the year before. There was a rivalry between Otto's Diocese of Bamberg, the Diocese of Magdeburg and the Diocese of Gniezno for the incorporation of Pomerania. Pope Innocent II solved the dispute by repelling their claims and placing the new diocese directly under his Holy See. The see of the diocese was the church of St Adalbert in Wollin. The diocese had no clear-cut borders in the beginning, but roughly reached from the Tribsees burgh in the West to the Leba River in the East. In the South, it comprised the northern parts of Uckermark and Neumark. As such, it was shaped after the territory held by Ratibor I, Duke of Pomerania.

After ongoing Danish raids, Wollin was destroyed, and the see of the diocese was shifted across the Dievenow to Cammin's (also Kammin, now Kamień Pomorski) St John's church in 1176. This was confirmed by the pope in 1186. In the early 13th century, the Cammin diocese, along with the Pomeranian dukes, gained control over Circipania. Also, the bishops managed to gain direct control over a territory around Kolberg (now Kolobrzeg) and Köslin (now Koszalin).

=== Dioceses of Włocławek, Roskilde and Schwerin ===
Pomeranian areas outside the Duchy of Pomerania were assigned to other dioceses. The Pomerelian areas were integrated into the Kuyavian Diocese of Włocławek. The Rugian areas were integrated into the Diocese of Schwerin (mainland) and the Diocese of Roskilde (islands).

== Wendish Crusade (1147) ==
In 1147, the Wendish Crusade, a campaign of the Northern Crusades, was mounted by bishops and nobles of the Holy Roman Empire. The crusaders pillaged the land and besieged Demmin and Szczecin despite the fact that both towns were (officially) Christian already. Wollin's bishop Adalbert took part in the negotiations that finally led to the lifting of the Szczecin siege by the crusaders. Ratibor I, Duke of Pomerania, went to the assembly of the Imperial Diet in Havelberg the following year, where he swore to be a Christian.

== Absalon (1168) ==
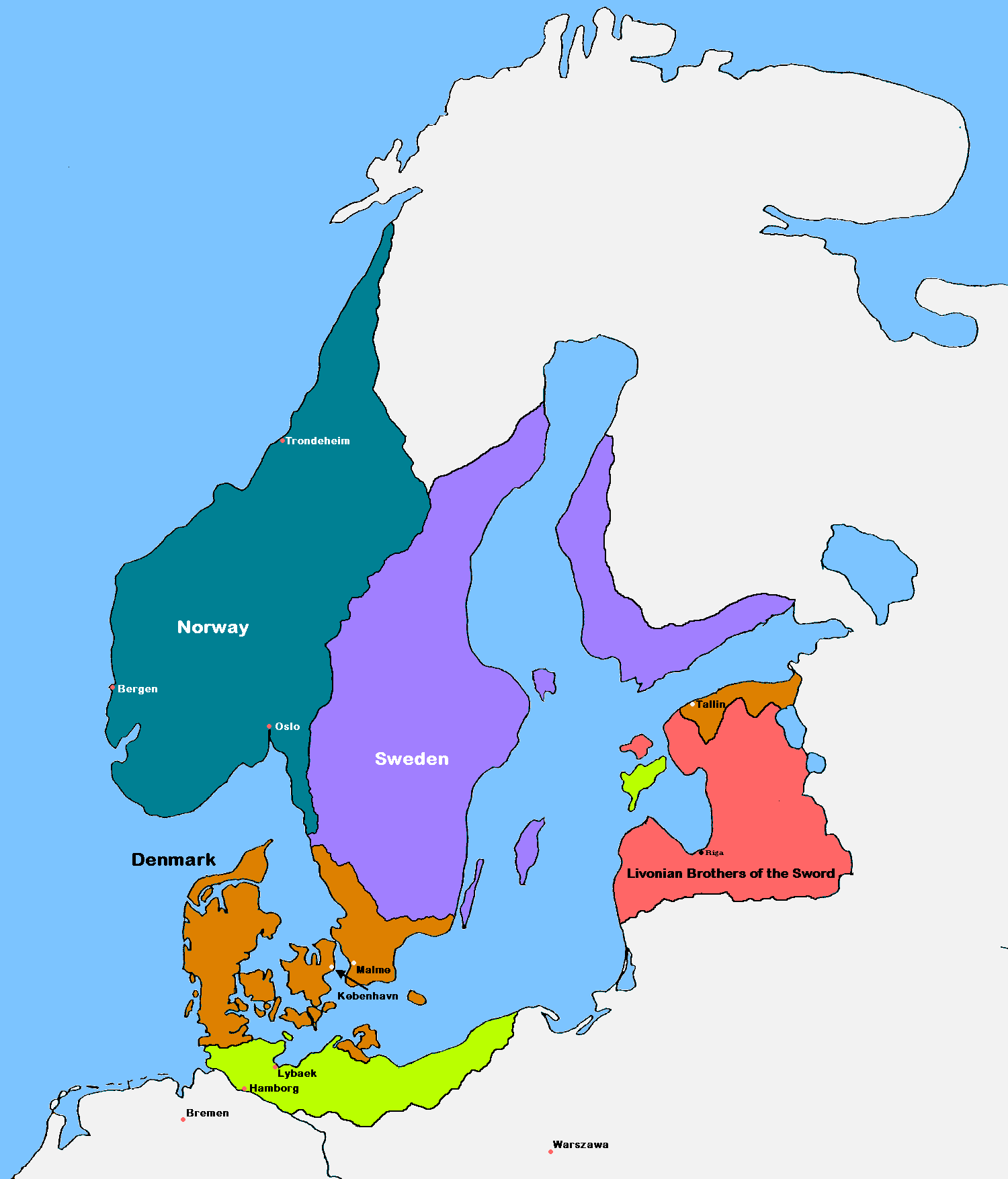
Scandinavia in 1219. Denmark in the 1170s, including the Principality of Rügen, is shown in orange; later gains including the Duchy of Pomerania are shown in light green.

After Otto von Bamberg's mission, only the Rani principality of Rugia (Rügen) remained pagan. This was changed by a Danish expedition of 1168, launched by Valdemar I of Denmark and Absalon, archbishop of Roskilde. The Danish success in this expedition ended a series of conflicts between Denmark and Rügen. The Rügen princes, starting with Jaromar I, became vassals of Denmark, and the principality would be Denmark's bridgehead on the southern shore of the Baltic for the next few centuries. The 1168 expedition was decided when, after a Danish siege of the burgh of Arkona, a fire broke out, leaving the defenders unable to further withstand the siege. Since Arkona was the major temple of the superior god Swantewit and therefore crucial for the powerful clerics, the Rani surrendered their other strongholds and temples without further fighting. Absalon had the Rani burn the wooden statues of their gods and integrated Rügen into the Diocese of Roskilde. The mainland of the Rügen principality was integrated into the Diocese of Schwerin.

== Monasteries ==
After the successful conversion of the nobility, monasteries were set up on vast areas granted by local dukes, both to further implement the Christian faith and to develop the land. The monasteries actively took part in the Ostsiedlung.

=== Cistercian ===
- Stolpe Abbey (1153 by Benedictinians, since 1304 Cistercian) near Gützkow
- Dargun Abbey (1173) in Circipania near the ducal residence burgh, later town of Demmin
- Kolbatz (1173) now Kołbacz in Poland
- Oliva Abbey (1186) (now part of nearby Danzig (Gdansk))
- Bergen (1193) in the center of Rügen, near the Ranis' former main burgh Charenza and just besides the residence of the Princes of Rügen, Rugard.
- Hilda/Eldena (1199) (now part of nearby Greifswald)
- Neuenkamp (1231)
- Stettin (1243)
- Marienflies (1248)
- Buckow (1252/1260) near Schlawe
- Ueckermünde (1260, later moved to Jasenitz)
- Stettin Marienstift (1261)
- Köslin (1278)
- Krummin (1289) on the island of Usedom
- Hiddensee (1296)
- Verchen (1304), south of Demmin
- Stettin Ottenstift (1346)

=== Premonstratensian ===
- Grobe/Pudagla (also Usedom Abbey) (1155), near Usedom (town) on the isle of Usedom
- Broda near the old Liutizian main temple site and capital, Rethra and the later town of Neubrandenburg
- Gramzow in the center of the Uckermark near the Ukrani burgh Oberuckersee and the town of Prenzlau
- Marienbusch (1224) near Treptow an der Rega
- Stolp

=== Dominican Order ===
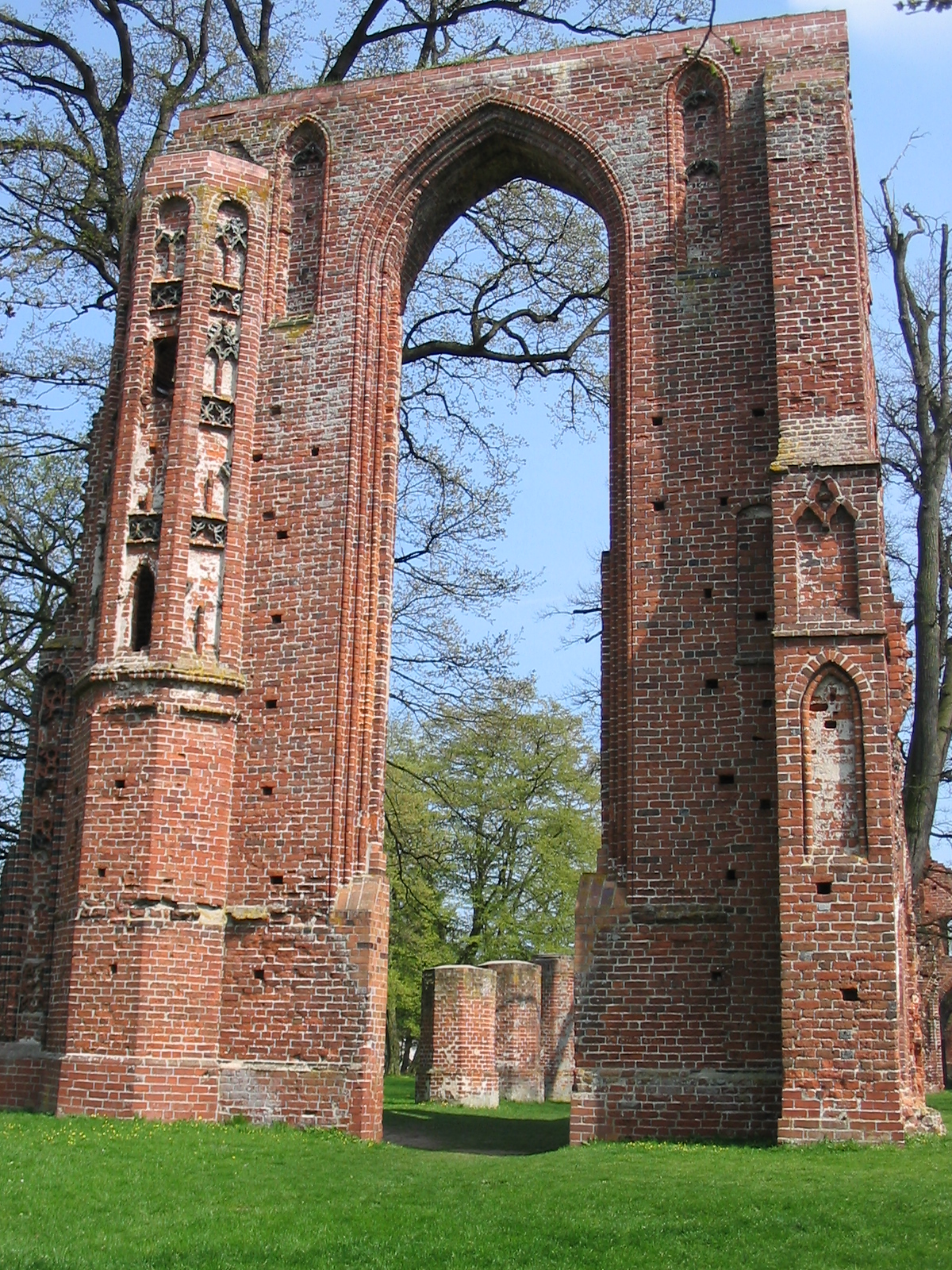
Ruins of Hilda Abbey (Eldena, Greifswald, founded in 1199) by Danish Cistercian monks

- Stralsund (1251)
- Cammin (1295)
- Greifswald Schwarzes Kloster ("Black Abbey") (1254)
- Pasewalk (1272)
- Stolp (1278)
- Prenzlau
- Soldin

=== Franciscan ===
- Stettin (1240)
- Prenzlau (before 1250)
- Stralsund (1254)
- Greifswald Graues Kloster ("Grey Abbey", donated by the Counts of Gützkow, now Pomerania State Museum) (1262)
- Pyritz
- Greifenberg

=== Augustinian ===
- Pyritz
- Gartz (Oder) (13th century)
- Stargard (13th century)
- Lippehne (1276)
- Anklam (14th century)
- Marienthron (14th century) near Neustettin
- Jasenitz - now Jasienica in Police

=== Benedictinian ===
- Stolpe Abbey (1253–1304)
- Kolberg

== See also ==
- Conversion of Poland
