= Karnin Lift Bridge =

Vertical-lift bridge

Coordinates: 53°50′37″N 13°51′20″E

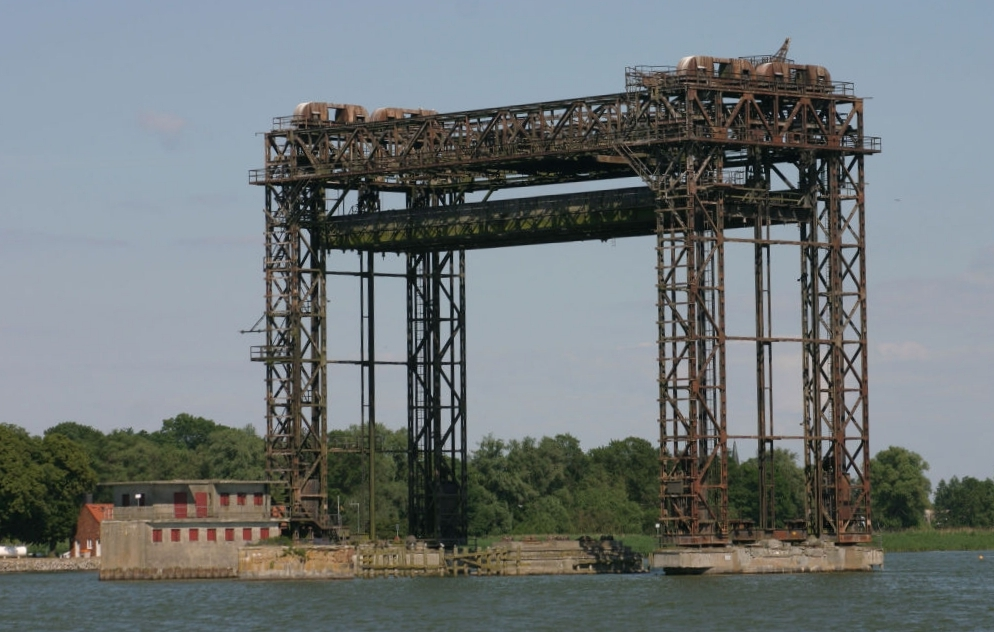
Karnin Lift Bridge in 2006

The Karnin Lift Bridge (German: Hubbrücke Karnin) is a railway bridge over the Peenestrom estuary in North Germany that was opened in 1933 and destroyed in 1945. It was part of the old Ducherow–Swinemünde railway. The lifting part of the bridge has stood since the end of the Second World War as a relic and technical monument in the middle of the Peenestrom. It was nominated for designation as a Historic Symbol of Engineering in Germany.

== Construction and history ==
A predecessor of the lift bridge was built in 1875 initially as a manually operated swing bridge. It was normally kept open to enable shipping in the Peenestrom to pass and was only closed when a train needed to cross the bridge. In 1908 the line was upgraded to double track.

The lift bridge was built in 1932 and 1933 as a result of the rise in railway operations and higher traffic loads. In the same period the Niederfinow Boat Lift was built to similar design principles and is still in operation today. The commonality of the two projects was so close that the cables of the Karnin Lift Bridge were pre-stressed on the construction site of the Niederfinow Boat Lift and then transported by special railway wagons to Karnin.

The bridge had a total length of 360 metres; the length of the lifting frame is 51.7 metres and its height 35 metres. The centre pier of the old swing bridge was left in place as an additional abutment for the lifting section; that and a lightweight design of the actual lifting section resulted in considerable savings in the weight of the moving part of the bridge.

Until its destruction on 28 April 1945, the bridge was the most important transport link from Usedom to the mainland. The bridge crossed the Strom, as the southern part of the Peenestrom is called, from the mouth of the Peene to the Stettin Lagoon, between Kamp and Karnin. This link was of great importance for the touristic development of the island, as well as the military installations on Usedom (the ammunition dump near Usedom town and the Peenemünde Army Research Centre from 1936). At the end of the Second World War the bridge was blown up by the Wehrmacht, in order to hinder the advance of the Red Army. They destroyed the flood bridges over the island and mainland, leaving the actual lift bridge undamaged. The centre section was saved because there were still units of the German navy operating in the Stettin Lagoon and they wanted to keep open an escape route to the Baltic Sea.

After the Second World War the railway link and bridge were not rebuilt because a section of the line now ran over Polish territory on Usedom near Swinemünde (Polish: Świnoujście). The blown-up flood bridges that had collapsed into the Peenestrom were recovered after 1945 and partly used in the rebuilding of the destroyed Oder bridges on the Prussian Ostbahn in Küstrin. The route of the old railway line from Ducherow via Karnin, Usedom and Dargen to Swinemünde can still be made out on satellite and aerial photographs.

Work on plans drawn up in the 1960s to rebuild the railway line and bridge was repeatedly shelved. Meanwhile, its transportation function was taken over by the Peene Bridge at Wolgast, which was designed as a combined railway and road bridge.

In 1990/91 bridge engineer Hans Nadler saved the lift bridge section from the serious threat of demolition. To carry out his aims of preserving and rebuilding the bridge as a monument, he and other like-minded people founded the Usedom Railway Society (Usedomer Eisenbahnfreunde e.V.) in 1992. Beginning in 1997, the society restored the station building at Karnin station and from 1999 to 2005 ran a small exhibition on the line's history.

The good condition of the lift bridge today is due to the fact that a rust-resistant steel was used, which corrodes very little even when not regularly painted.

== Current situation ==
In Germany's 2003 Federal Transport Infrastructure Plan, the rebuilding of the line from Seebad Heringsdorf via Świnoujście to Ducherow was listed under the international projects section. Such a link would cut the travel time between Berlin and the island of Usedom from the present four hours to about two hours. Because the Karnin Lift Bridge is on the Ducherow–Swinemünde railway, current attempts to rebuild the bridge have been included as part of that. On 9 April 2010 in Berlin around 50 politicians and business representatives from Germany and Poland founded the Karnin Bridge Action Coalition (Aktionsbündnis Karniner Brücke), which intends to push forward the reconstruction of the railway and the reactivation of the bridge. In November 2010 it began collecting signatures Germany-wide for a petition to rebuild the southern railway link on the island of Usedom via Karnin. At the same time the Usedom Railway Society and Dargen Cycle Museum (Zweiradmuseum Dargen) presented a model of the historic lift bridge at 1:27 scale, which is to be displayed publicly in various German cities as well as in Szczecin.

Present appearance

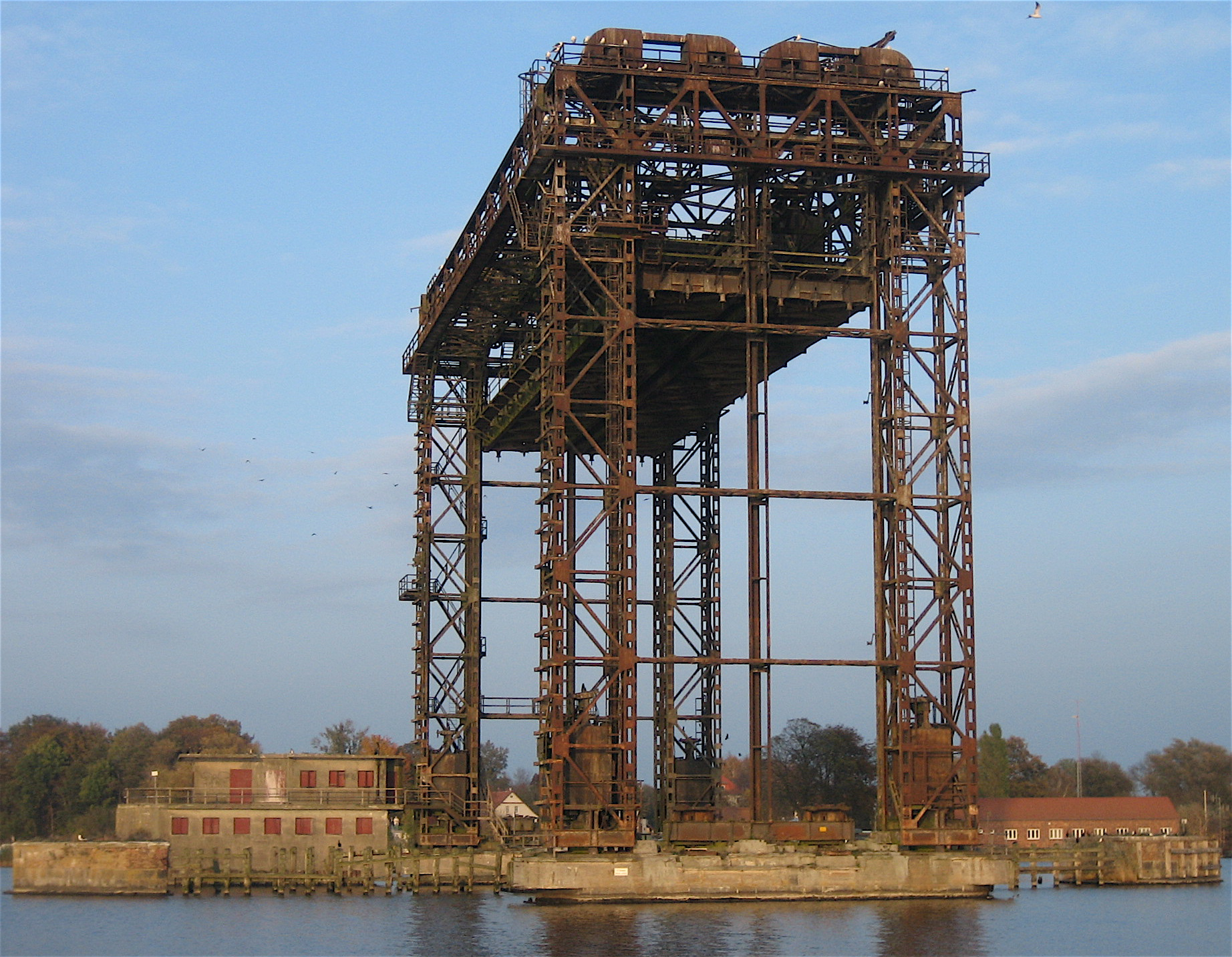
Side view

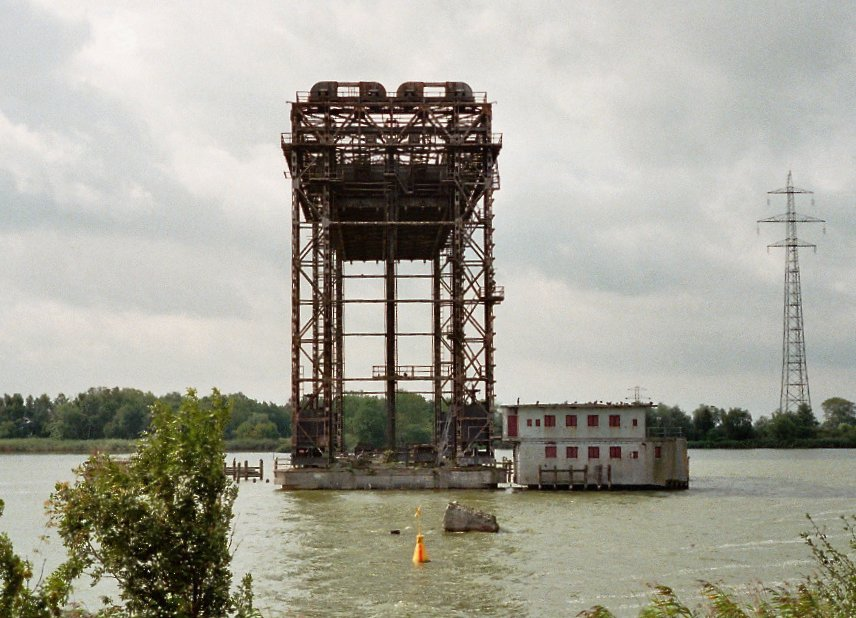
Frontal view

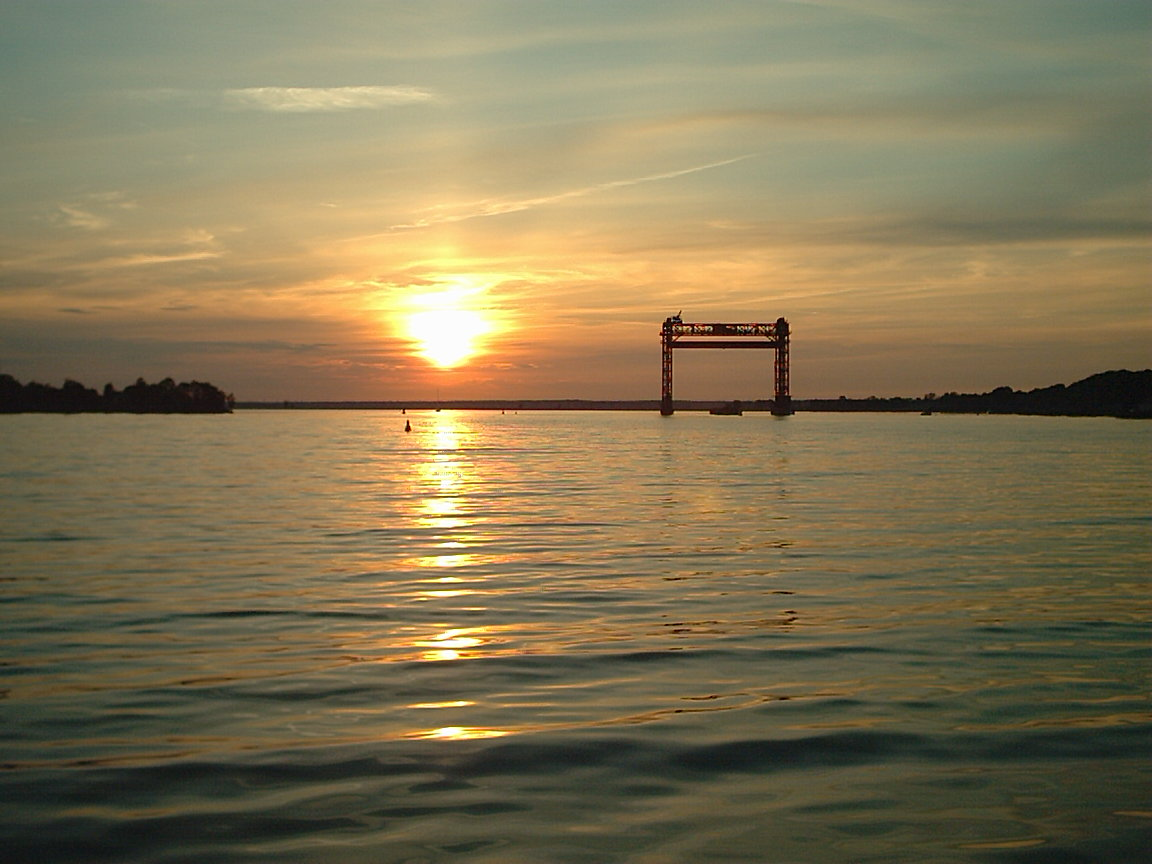
Technical monument: centre section of the Karnin Lift Bridge in the Peenestrom

== Literature ==
- Joachim Evers; Hans Nadler (2003), The Eisenbahnhubbrücke Karnin (in German), Radke-Verlag, ISBN 3-932614-16-X
- Heiko Bergmann (2007), The Eisenbahnhubbrücke Karnin – technisches Meisterwerk bei Usedom (in German), Ueckermünde: Küsten-Regionalverlag, ISBN 978-3-9809539-2-4
