= Pomeranians (Slavic tribe) =

West Slavic tribe

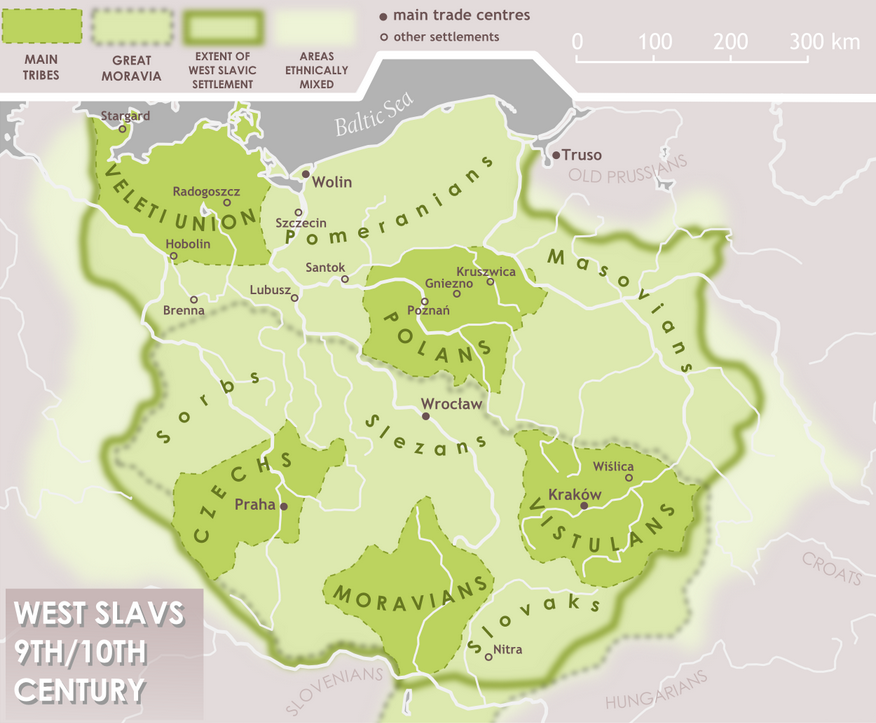
West Slavic ethnic groups, 9th to 10th centuries

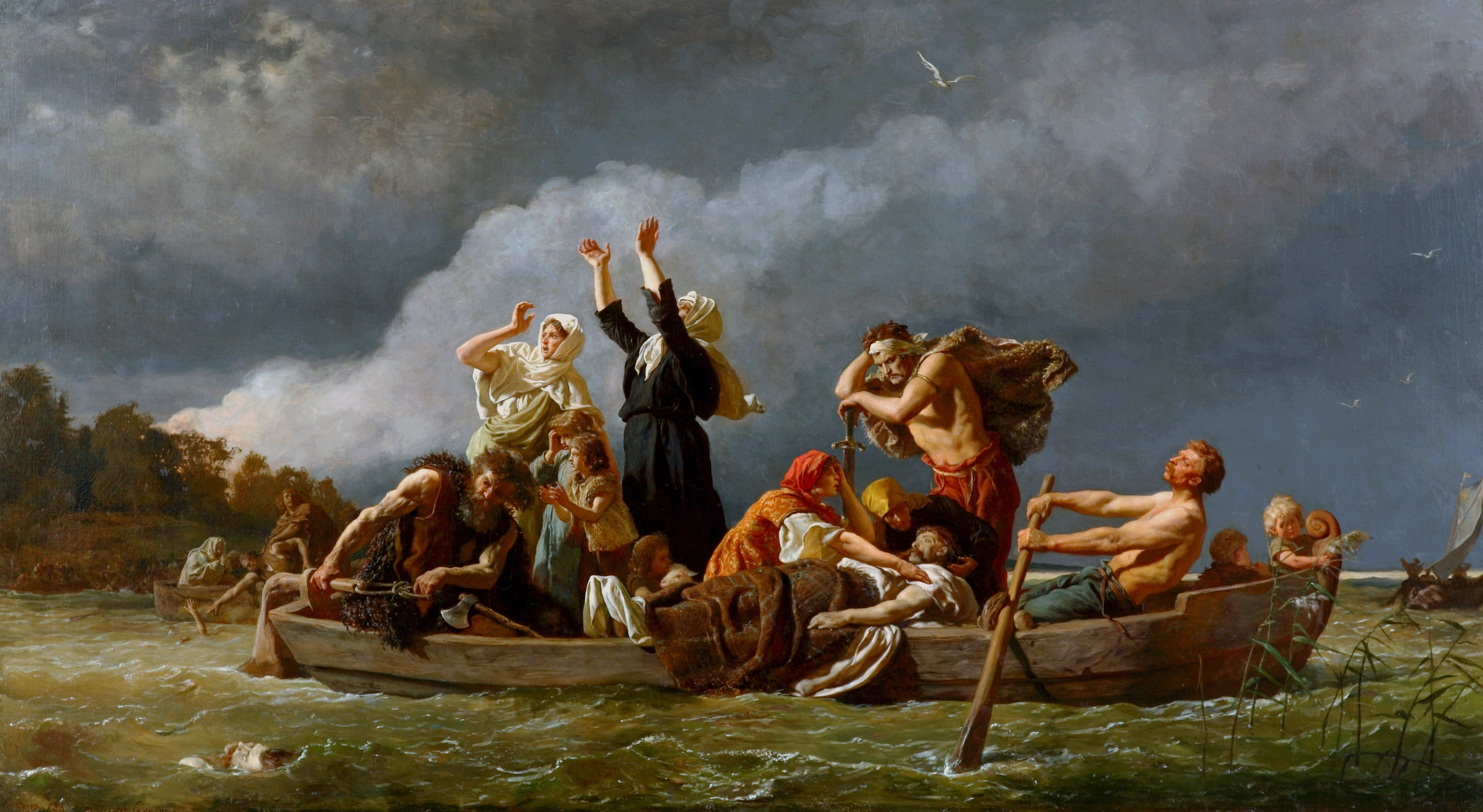
Without land. Pomeranians ousted by the Germans to the Baltic Islands by Wojciech Gerson, 1888, National Museum in Szczecin

Coat of arms of the House of Griffin

The Pomeranians (Kashubian: Pòmòrzónie; Polish: Pomorzanie; German: Pomoranen), first mentioned as such in the 10th century, were a West Slavic tribe, which from the 5th to the 6th centuries had settled in the region of Pomerania, along the southern coast of the Baltic Sea between the mouths of the Recknitz and Vistula Rivers. They spoke the Pomeranian language which belonged to the Lechitic languages, a branch of the West Slavic language family.

The name Pomerania has its origin in the Old Polish po more, which means "Land at the Sea".

== Prehistory ==
Following the exit of the Hamburgian hunters, the area was inhabited successively by Celts and the Wielbark Culture (Germanic tribes similar to the Goths and the Rugians). Groups of Slavs populated the area as a result of the Slavic migration. The Pomeranian tribes formed around the 6th century. There was also a Pomeranian culture, which was replaced by the Jastorf culture.

From around the 6th century, West Slavic tribes migrated via the Vistula and Oder Rivers into the southern Baltics, where sizable settlements of Vikings and Danes and large trading centers thrived, such as Jomsburg at the mouth of the Oder and Danzig at the mouth of the Vistula and possibly Baltic settlement centres between the Parsęta and the Vistula. According to the 12th-century Nestor Chronicle, the Pomeranians, as well as Poles, Masovians and Lusitanians originated from the tribe of the Lechites.

=== 10th to 12th centuries ===
By 967, Duke Mieszko I had after a decisive battle against the Wolinians, led by Wichmann the Younger, gained full control over the lands between the Vistula and the mouth of the Oder. The earliest known documented use of the term Pomorie dates to 997 in reference to the Duke of Pomorie.

The Piast dukes of Poland began to incorporate the Pomeranians into their realm and succeeded initially. In 1005, Polish Duke Bolesław I the Brave loses control over the area. In the Annales Altahenses, a Zemuzil Bomerianorum is mentioned as the first duke known by name in 1064.

During the 12th century, the pagan Pomeranians faced continuous incursions by their expanding Christian neighbours of Denmark, Poland and the Saxon dukes of the Holy Roman Empire. In 1121, they were eventually subdued by Polish Duke Bolesław III Wrymouth, who established a diocese with its seat at Kołobrzeg, where Reinbern became the first bishop. Pomerania was Christianized with the help of the German missionary Otto of Bamberg.

At the same time the Pomeranian Prince Wartislaw I conquered the former Lutici lands west of the Oder. After his successors from the House of Griffins were defeated by the Saxons at the 1164 Battle of Verchen, they accepted the overlordship of Duke Henry the Lion. The Pomeranian lands were eventually divided, with the Western parts entering the Holy Roman Empire as the Duchy of Pomerania in 1181, and the Eastern part consisting of Pomerelia under the Samborides coming under the influence of Poland and, from 1309 onwards, the Teutonic Order.

The influx of settlers from the Holy Roman Empire during the Ostsiedlung caused the Germanization of Pomerania, as many native Pomeranians were slowly and gradually assimilated and discontinued the use of their Slavic language and culture.

The direct descendants of the Pomeranians include:

- Kashubians, who speak the Kashubian language
- Slovincians
- Kociewiacy
- Borowiacy
- Western Pomeranians, who speak Low German or Standard German
- Eastern Pomeranians, who were expelled from Pomerania in 1945 and settled in various parts of Germany and now speak either local dialects or Standard German.

== See also ==
- Conversion of Pomerania
- Kashubian-Pomeranian Association
- Pomeranian culture
- Polish tribes
- Early history of Pomerania
- List of Medieval Slavic tribes
