= Ratibor I =

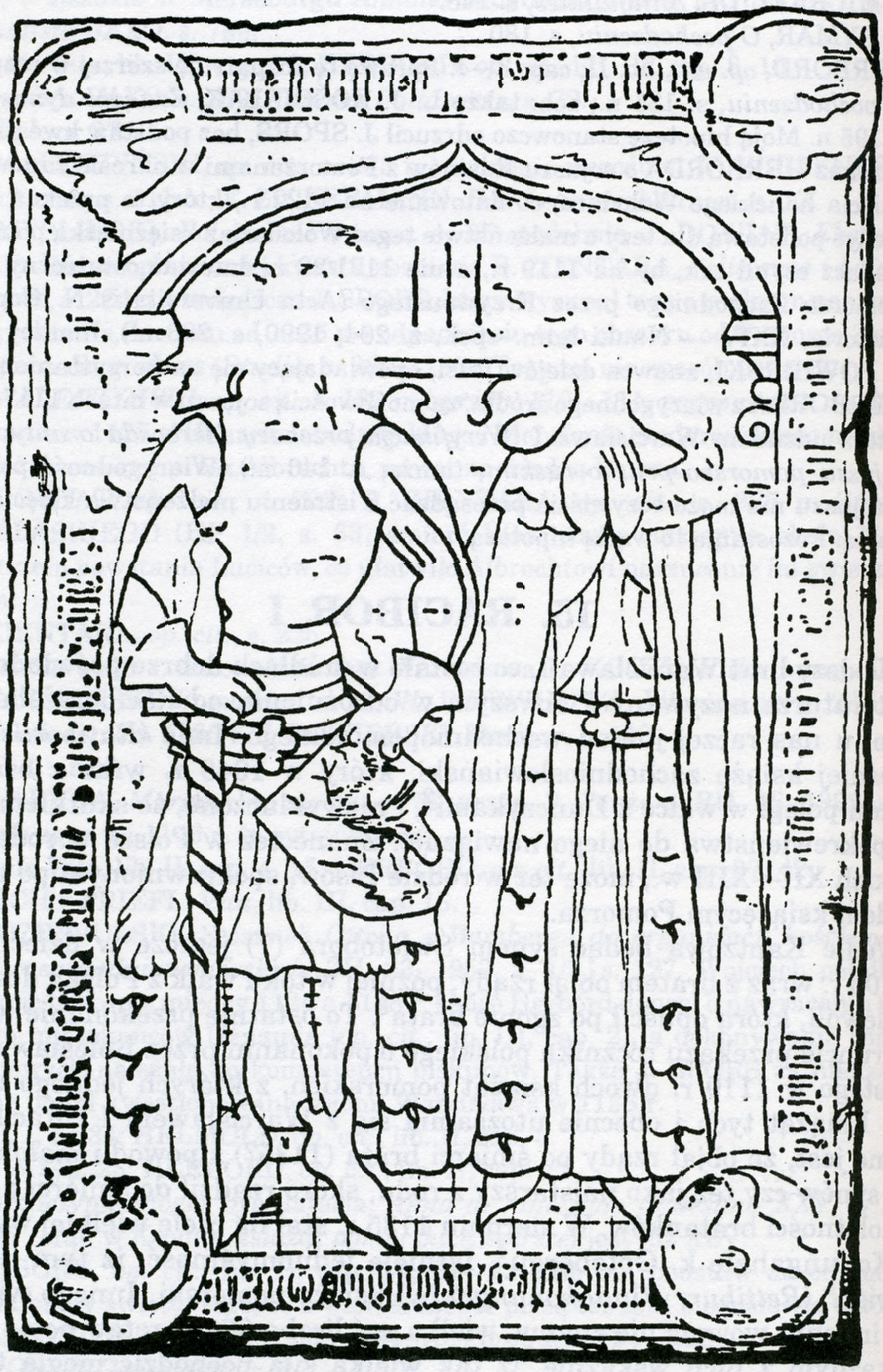
Prince Racibor I with his wife Przybysława. Tombstone from around 1370 in the church tower in Usedom.

Ratibor I (Racibor) (c. 1124 – 1156) of the House of Pomerania (Griffins) was Duke of Pomerania. He was married to Pribislawa (Przybysława), and was the ancestor of the Ratiborides sideline of the Griffins.

Initially he might have ruled the Land of Słupsk-Sławno and also ruled the duchy of his brother Wartislaw I who was slain by pagans in place of his minor sons from 1136 to 1156.

In 1135, he raided the Norwegian city of Kungahälla (now Kungälv in Sweden).

During the Wendish Crusade in 1147, he managed to end the siege of Szczecin together with Wolin bishop Adalbert.

== Family ==
In 1153, Ratibor and Adalbert founded Stolpe Abbey at the Peene River near Gützkow.

With Pribislawa Iaroslavovna (Princess of Volhynia), he had at least four children.

- Swantepolk II (or Swantopolk), who succeeded his father in Słupsk-Sławno
- Margareta (or Margarete) ∞ Bernhard I of Ratzeburg
- Bogislav (or Wartislaw)
- Dobroslawa

Ratibor I House of Pomerania Born: ~ 1124 Died: April or May 1156
Preceded by Wartislaw I of Pomerania-Demmin and Stettin	Duke of Pomerania; 1135–1156	Succeeded by Bogislaw I of Pomerania-Stettin
Preceded by Wartislaw I of Pomerania-Demmin and Stettin	Duke of Pomerania; 1135–1156	Succeeded by Casimir I of Pomerania-Demmin
Preceded by unknown, probably Swantepolk I	Duke of Schlawe-Stolp until 1156	Succeeded by Swantepolk II of Schlawe-Stolp

== See also ==
- List of Pomeranian duchies and dukes
- History of Pomerania
- Duchy of Pomerania
- House of Pomerania
- Lands of Schlawe and Stolp
