= Otto of Bamberg =

German Christian missionary

Saint Otto of Bamberg
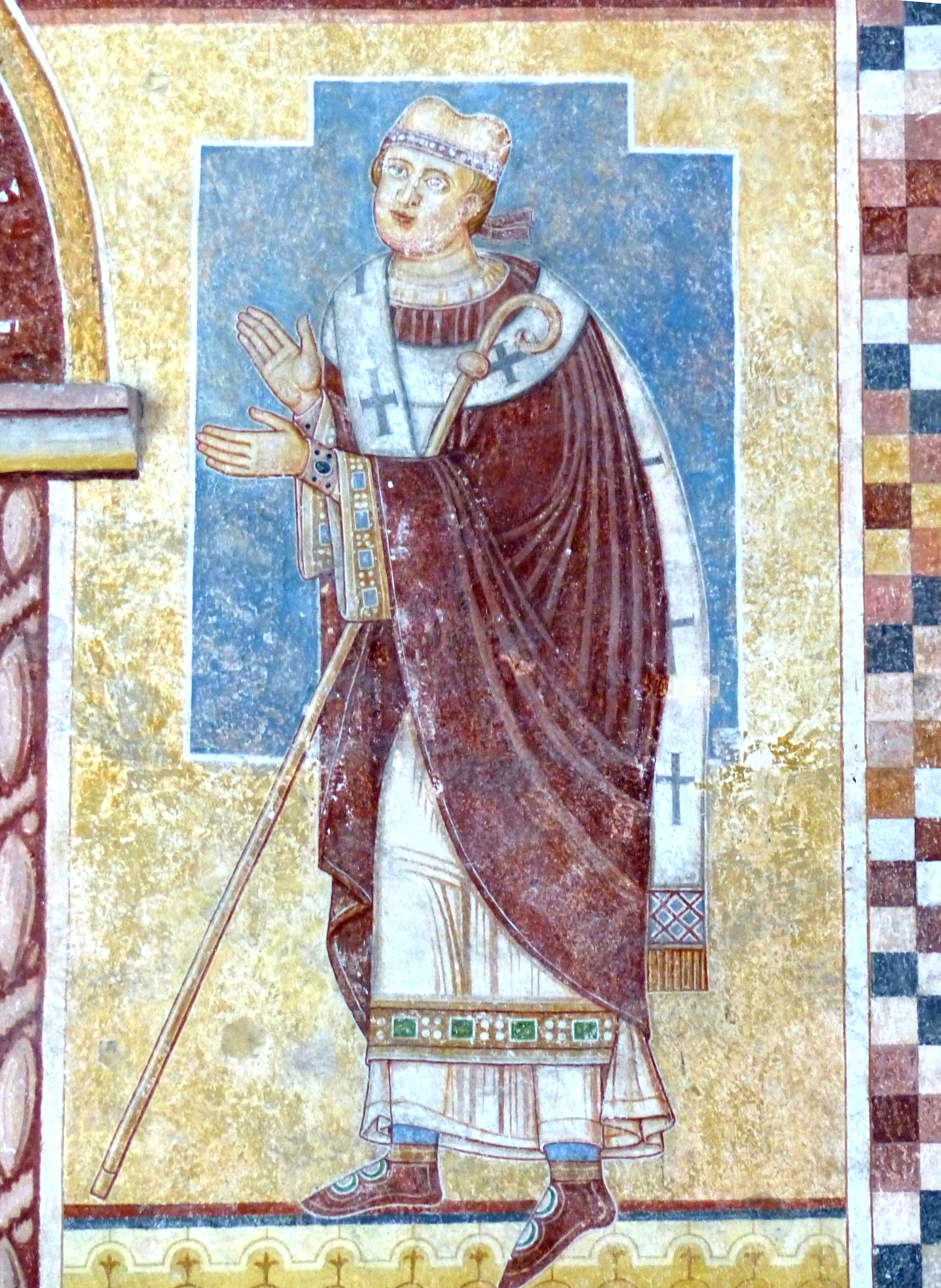
- Otto of Bamberg depicted in a Romanesque fresco, Prüfening Abbey, c. 1130

Bishop and Confessor; Apostle of Pomerania
- Born: c. 1060; Mistelbach, Franconia(?)
- Died: 30 June 1139; Bamberg, Franconia
- Venerated in: Catholic Church
- Canonized: 1189, Rome by Pope Clement III
- Major shrine: Michaelsberg Abbey, Bamberg, Bavaria, Germany
- Feast: 2 July

Otto of Bamberg (1060 or 1061 – 30 June 1139) was a German missionary and papal legate who converted much of medieval Pomerania to Christianity. He was the bishop of Bamberg from 1102 until his death. He was canonized in 1189.

== Early life ==
Three biographies of Otto were written in the decades after his death. Wolfger of Prüfening wrote his between 1140 and 1146 at Prüfening Abbey; Ebo of Michelsberg wrote between 1151 and 1159); and Herbord of Michelsberg wrote in 1159.

According to contemporary sources, Otto was born into a noble (edelfrei) family which held estates in the Swabian Jura. He was related to the Staufers through his mother. A possible descent from the Franconian noble house of Mistelbach has not been conclusively established. As his elder brother inherited their father's property, Otto prepared for an ecclesiastical career and was sent to school, probably in Hirsau Abbey or one of its filial monasteries.

When in 1082 the Salian princess Judith of Swabia, sister of Emperor Henry IV, married the Piast duke Władysław I Herman, he followed her as a chaplain to the Polish court. In 1091 he entered the service of emperor Henry IV; he was appointed the emperor's chancellor in 1101 and supervised the construction of Speyer Cathedral.

== Bishop ==
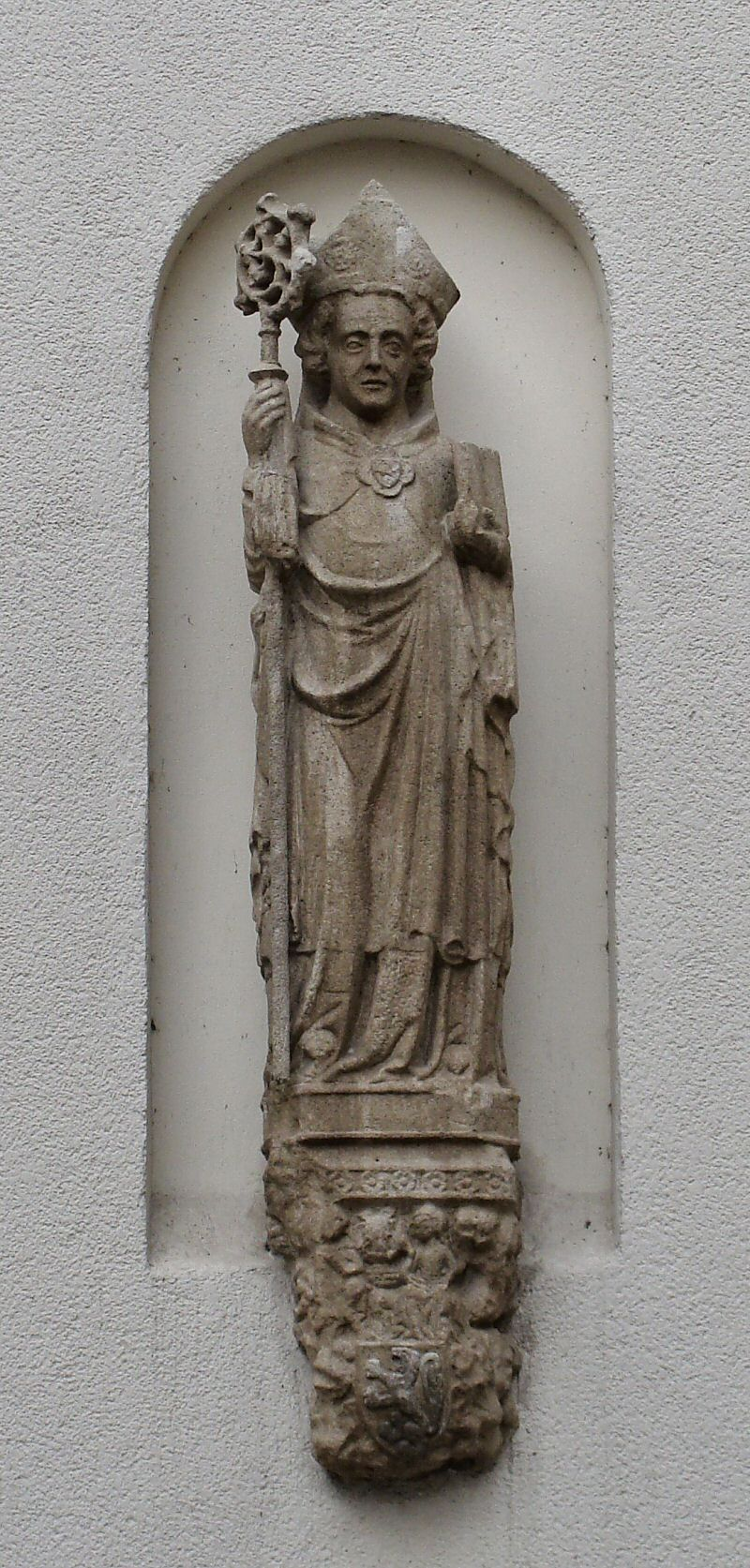
Statue of Otto in the Pomeranian Ducal Castle, Szczecin

In 1102, the emperor appointed and invested him as Bishop of Bamberg in Franconia (now in the state of Bavaria), and Otto became one of the leading princes of medieval Germany. He consolidated his widely scattered territories and during his tenure as bishop, Bamberg rose to great prominence. Otto established more than 30 monasteries and hospitals between Carinthia and Saxony and had castles built. He helped the population out of his own pocket when they were in need.

In 1106 Otto received the pallium from Pope Paschal II. It was Bishop Otto, substituting for the imprisoned archbishop Adalbert of Mainz, who clothed Hildegard of Bingen as a Benedictine nun at Disibodenberg Abbey about 1112. He remained loyal to the Imperial court and, as a consequence, was suspended by a papal party led by Cuno of Praeneste at the Synod of Fritzlar in 1118. He achieved fame as diplomat and politician, notably during the Investiture Controversy between the emperor and the papacy. At the Congress of Würzburg in 1121, Otto successfully negotiated the peace treaty, the Concordat of Worms, which was signed in 1122. For his contribution, Otto I received gifts from Emperor Heinrich V for the benefit of the cathedral. In the 1130s, he continued to arbitrate between Emperor Lothair of Supplinburg and the rising Hohenstaufens.

As bishop, Otto led a simple and frugal life, but did much to improve his ecclesiastical and temporal realms. He restored and completed Bamberg Cathedral after it had been damaged by fire in 1081, improved the cathedral school, established numerous monasteries and built a number of churches throughout his territory. He greatly expanded the town of Bamberg, rebuilding the Monastery of St. Michael, which had been destroyed by an earthquake around 1117.

== Missionary ==
Among his great accomplishments was his peaceful and successful missionary work among the Pomeranians, after several previous forcible attempts by the Polish rulers and the Spanish bishop Bernard to convert Pomerania to Christianity had failed. Otto was sent on his first mission by the Polish duke Bolesław III Wrymouth in 1124.

Otto's approach was decidedly different from Bernard's. Bernard traveled alone and as a poor and unknown priest, whereas Otto, a wealthy and famous man, was accompanied by 20 clergy of his own diocese, numerous servants, 60 warriors supplied to him by Boleslaw, and carried with him numerous supplies and gifts. The fact that he was already wealthy assured the Pomeranians that his aim was only to convert them to Christianity, not to become wealthy at their expense. As the official papal legate, he converted a large number of Pomeranians, notably in the towns of Pyrzyce, Kamień, Szczecin, and Jomsborg, and became known as the "Apostle of Pomerania." The Bamberg bishop is said to have baptized over 22,000 people in Pomerania and founded eleven churches.

After he returned to Bamberg in 1125, some pagan customs began to reassert themselves, and Otto journeyed once more to Pomerania in 1128. In this he had the support of Wartislaw I, Duke of Pomerania. He also sent priests from Bamberg to serve in Pomerania. His intent to consecrate a bishop for Pomerania was thwarted by the bishops of Magdeburg and Gniezno who claimed metropolitan rights over Pomerania. Only after his death in 1139 was his former companion, Adalbert of Pomerania, consecrated as Bishop of Wolin, in 1140.

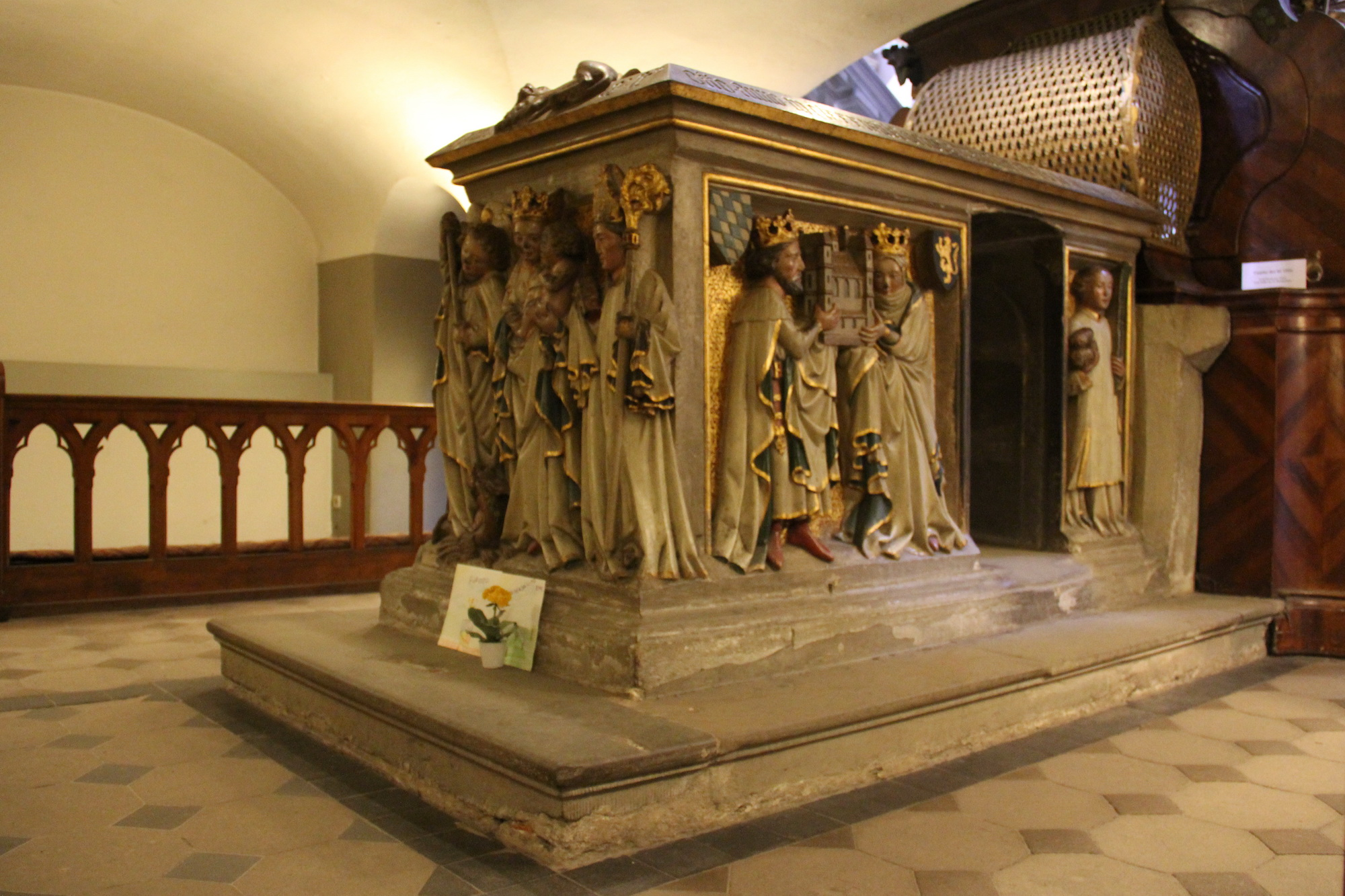
Otto's tomb in the Michaelsberg Abbey Church

The area of eastern Pomerania around Gdańsk was Christianized via Pomerania as well, and the monastery of Oliwa was established at that time, while Prussia was Christianized later via Riga by the Teutonic Knights.

== Veneration ==
Otto died on 30 June 1139, and was buried in Michaelsberg Abbey, Bamberg. He was canonised in 1189 by Pope Clement III. Although he died on 30 June, his name is recorded in the Roman martyrology on 2 July. The high festival of the saint is still celebrated in the Archdiocese of Bamberg on September 30.

Otto is the patron saint of the Archdiocese of Bamberg, co-patron of the Archdiocese of Berlin, of the Diocese of Stettin-Kammin, and invoked for help against fever and rabies.

== See also ==
- Christianization of Pomerania
