= Wartislaw I =

First duke of Pomerania and founder of the Griffin dynasty

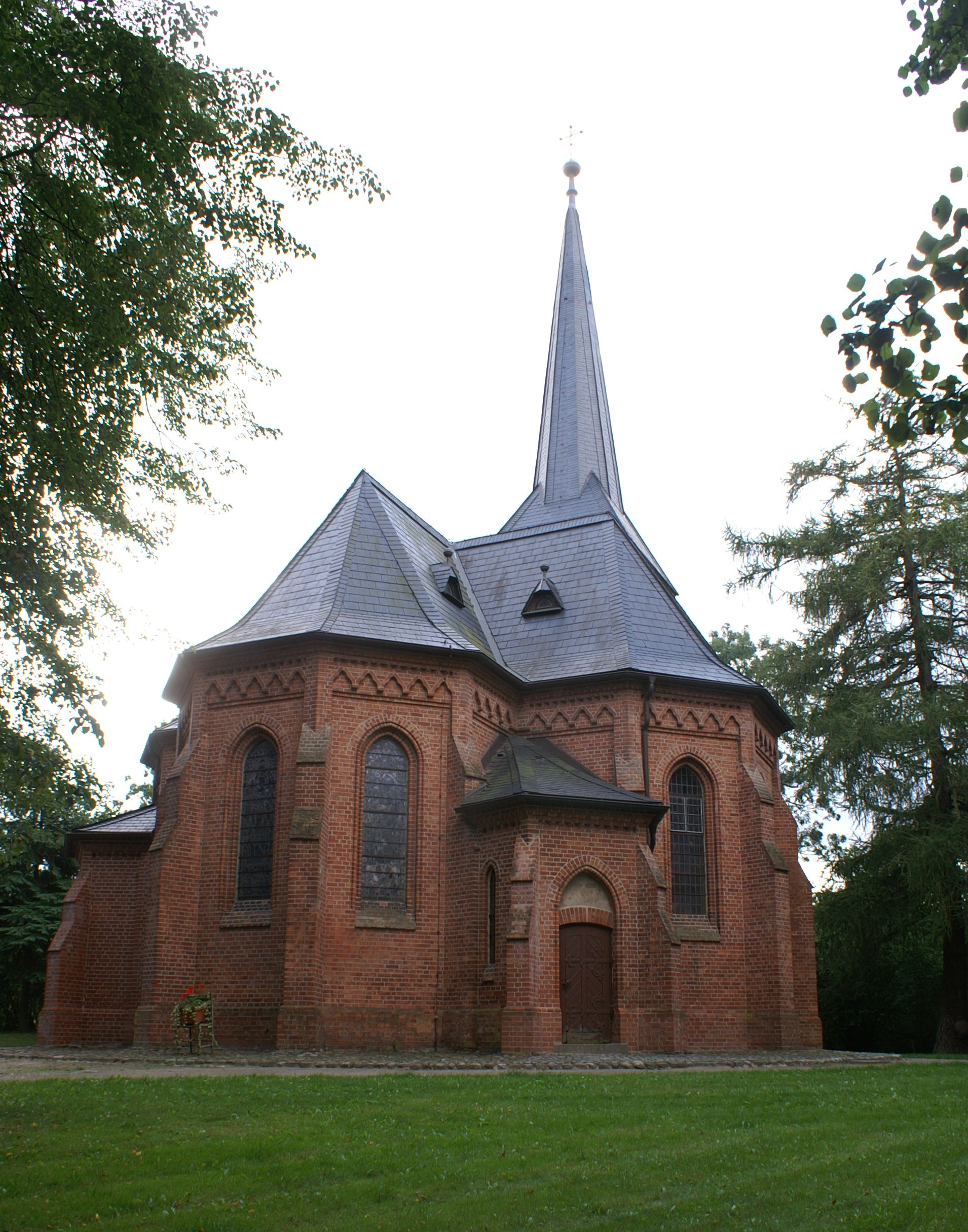
Wartislaw Memorial Church, Stolpe.

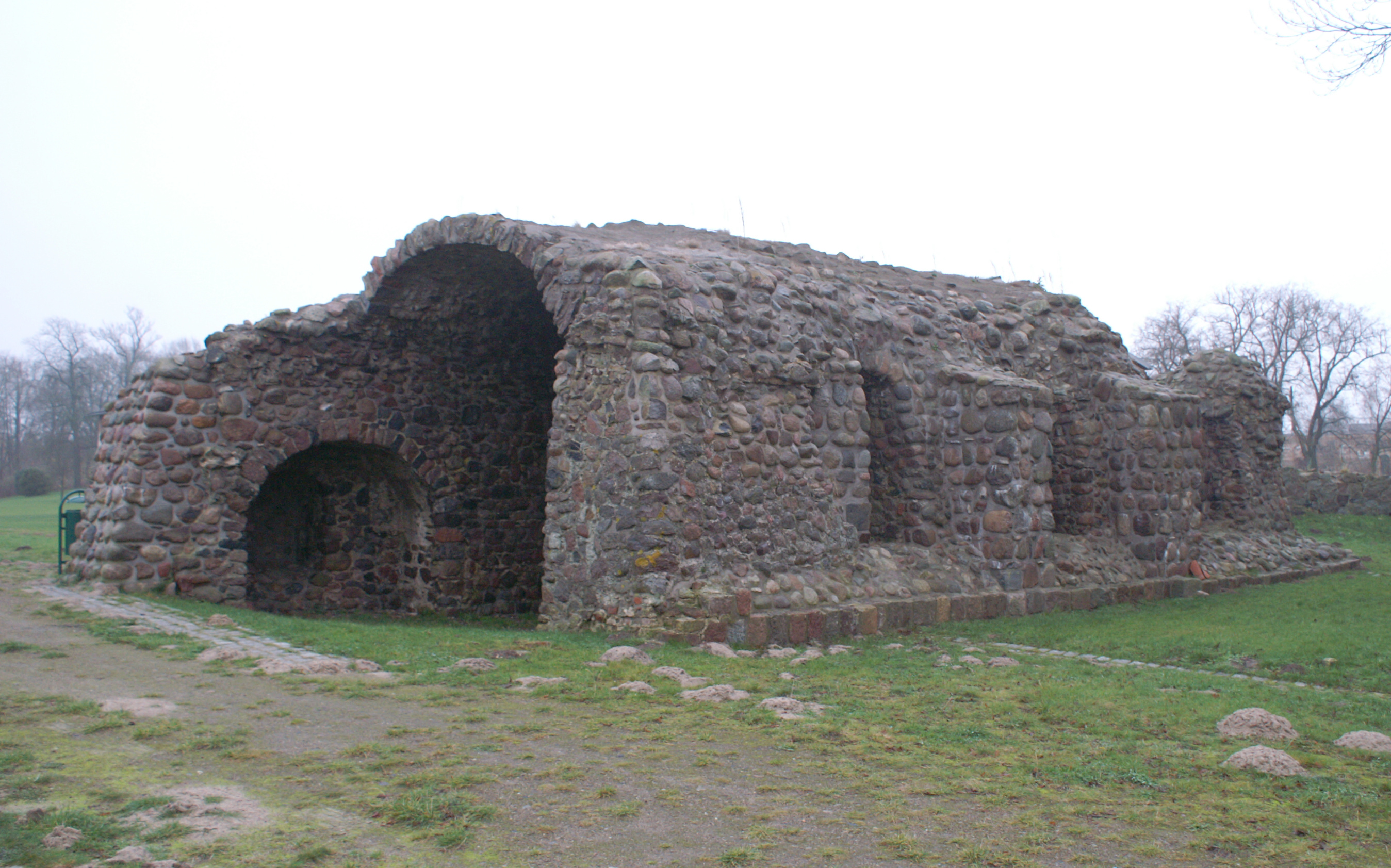
Ratibor, Wartislaw's brother, founded Stolpe Abbey, Pomerania's oldest monastery, in Wartislaw's memory.

Wartislaw I (Warcisław I; c. 1092 – August 9, 1135) was the first historical ruler of the Duchy of Pomerania and the founder of the Griffin Dynasty.

Most of the information about him comes from the writings on the life of Otto of Bamberg. He was of Slavic origin, most likely born around the turn of the twelfth century. Early in life he was probably a "crypto-Christian", after being baptized while a prisoner of the Saxons, because he wanted to hide his new religion from his still pagan subjects. In 1109 Wartislaw was defeated in the Battle of Nakło by Bolesław III Wrymouth, the Duke of Poland. By 1112, Wartislaw had failed to keep faith with Bolesław, who in response besieged Nakło. This led to Wartislaw reswearing fealty to Bolesław. A year later he was again violating the terms of the agreement with Bolesław, which result in a military campaign against him. Faced with overwhelming odds, Wartislaw agreed to pay tribute to Bolesław, as well as to Christianize Pomerania. To that effect, he, along with Bolesław, backed Otto of Bamberg in his successful Conversion of Pomerania. By 1124 his residence was in (Kammin) Kamień Pomorski.

The last time he is mentioned explicitly in chronicles is by Saxo Grammaticus who describes a joint Polish-Danish expedition against Wartislaw around 1129/1130, which was directed at the islands of Wolin and Uznam. The Danish King Niels is supposed to have taken him prisoner but released later after the intervention of "King of the Obotrites" Canute Lavard.

The author of the chronicles of Otto does not give the name of Wartislaw's wife, only that she was a Christian. Otto also forced Wartislaw to send home his previous 24 wives and concubines before he could marry her. The Pomeranian chronicler Thomas Kantzow, writing almost four hundred years later, states that Wartislaw was married to a Heila from Saxony. She is supposed to have died in 1128 and the following year the Duke married Ida, the daughter of Niels of Denmark or of Canute Lavard (Kanztow changed his chronicles in subsequent editions in this respect). However, the names and origins of both supposed wives have been questioned by later historians. Edward Rymar argues that if Wartislaw had indeed been married to a German princess then sources such as the life of Otto would have surely mentioned that fact. Rymar hypothesizes instead that Wartislaw's wife was probably from the Ruthenian Rurik dynasty.

He had two sons and a daughter: Bogusław I, Duke of Pomerania, Casimir I, Duke of Pomerania, and Woizlava, who married Pribislav of Mecklenburg.

Wartislaw was murdered sometime between 1134 and 1148, and was succeeded by his brother Ratibor I. The site of Wartislaw's death near Stolpe in the modern district of Vorpommern-Greifswald, where he is said to have been slain by pagans, is marked by a rock called Wartislawstein with an engraved Christian cross in remembrance of his missionary efforts.

== See also ==
- List of Pomeranian duchies and dukes
- History of Pomerania
- Duchy of Pomerania
- House of Pomerania
- Gryfici (Świebodzice)

== Sources ==
- Dalewski, Zbigniew (2008). Ritual and Politics: Writing the History of a Dynastic Conflict in Medieval Poland. Brill.

Wartislaw I House of Pomerania Born: ~ 1091 Died: 1135
Preceded by unknown	Duke of Pomerania; 1120s–1135	Succeeded by Ratibor I
