= Stolpe Abbey =

Monastery in Pomerania, Germany

Coordinates: 53°52′23.71″N 13°33′41.19″E

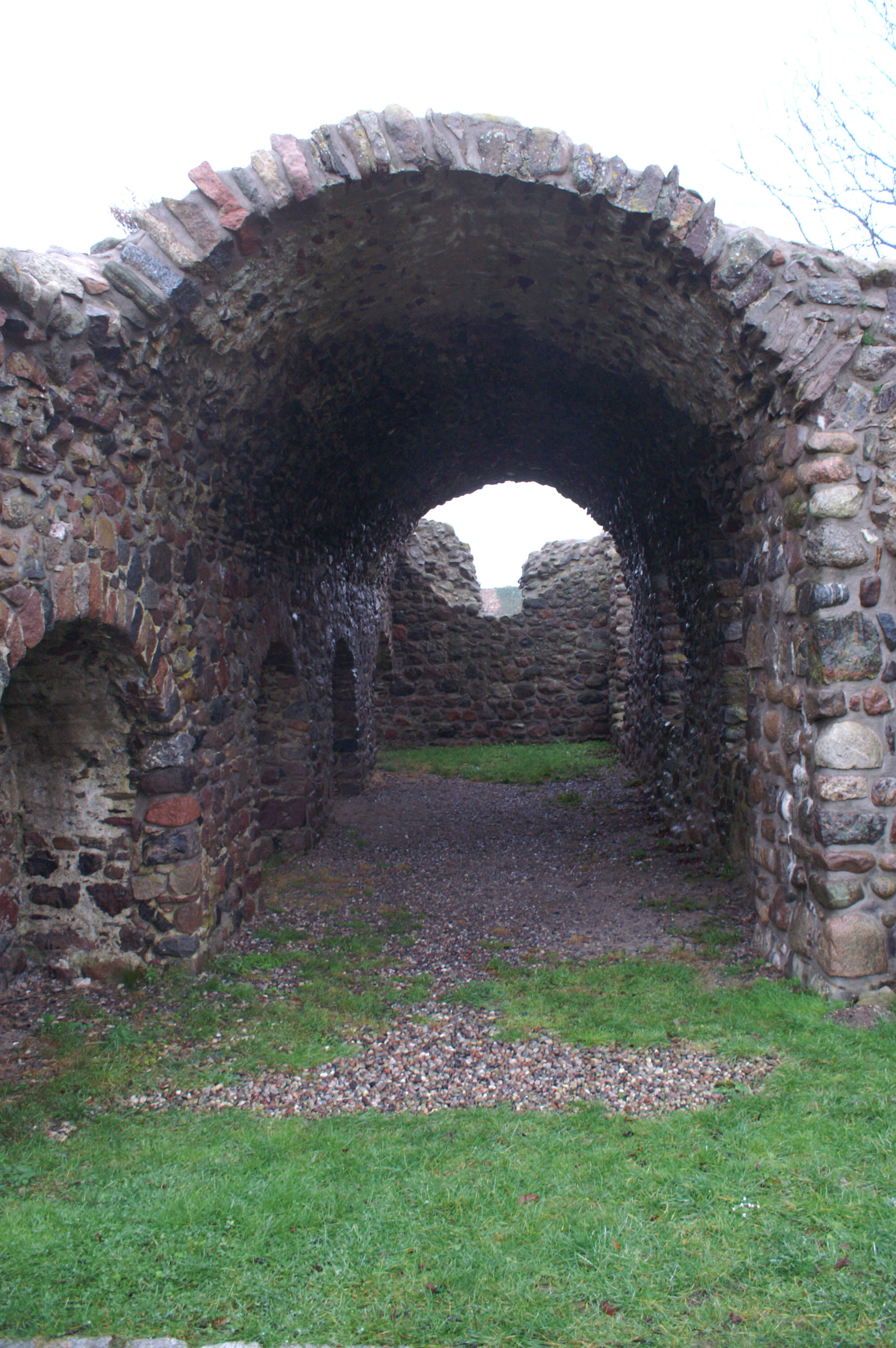
Ruins of Stolpe Abbey

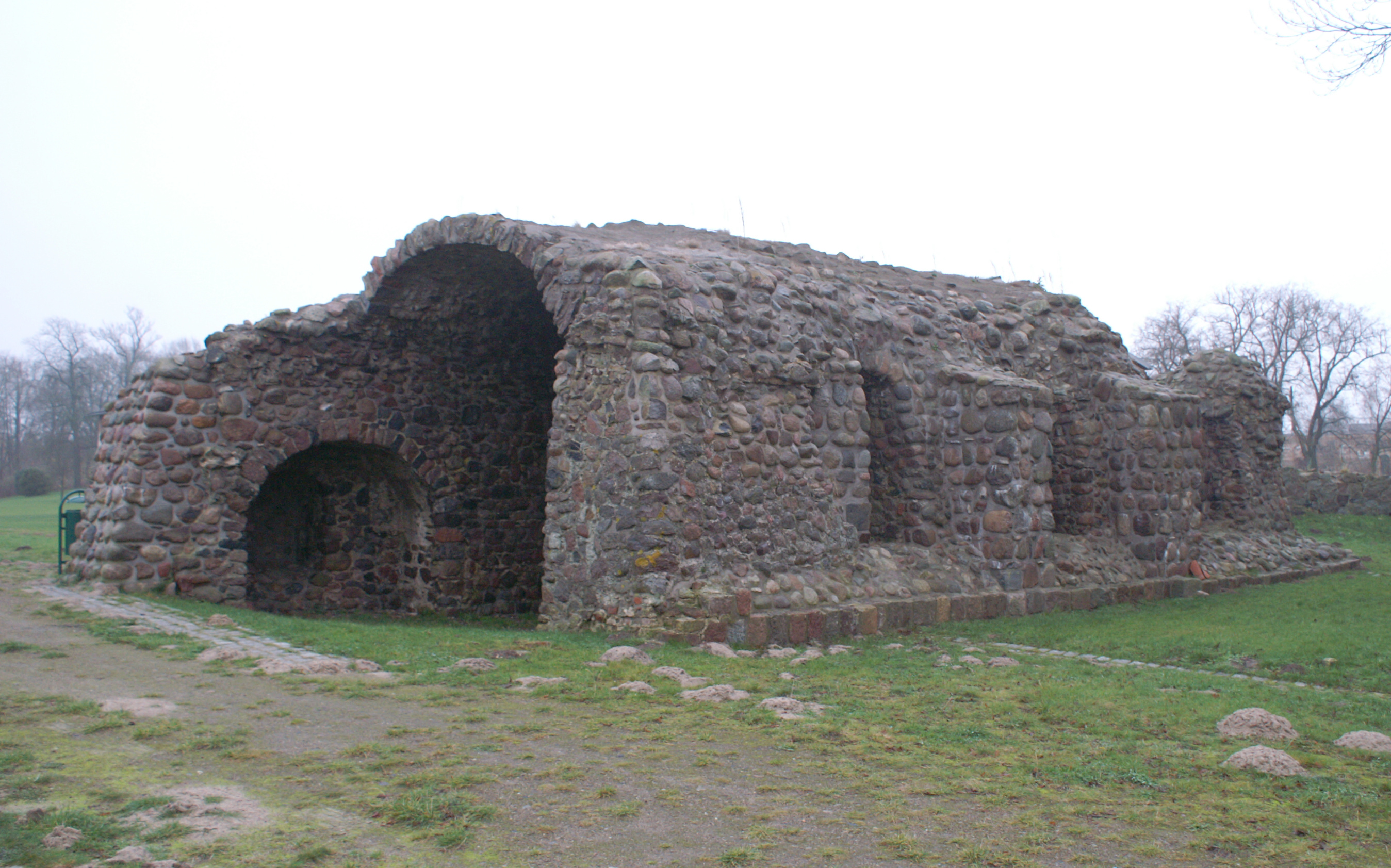
Ruins of Stolpe Abbey

Location of Stolpe in Vorpommern-Greifswald

Stolpe Abbey (German: Kloster Stolpe; founded 1153, dissolved 1534) was the first monastery in Pomerania. It was located on the southern bank of the Peene River between Gützkow and Anklam near the village of Stolpe an der Peene.

Ratibor I, Duke of Pomerania, founded the abbey on 3 May 1153 in memory of his brother Wartislaw I. Wartislaw, who had subdued the area and converted its people to Christianity in the late 1120s, was killed near the site of the future monastery; according to legend he was murdered by a Liutician pagan.

The abbey was settled by Benedictine monks from Berge Abbey near Magdeburg. The Pomeranian dukes and the Counts of Gützkow granted the new foundation extensive lands in the vicinity. In 1164, a meeting between the Duke of Saxony, Henry the Lion, and King Valdemar I of Denmark was held here.

In 1304, the abbey became part of the Cistercian Order, and was made a daughter house of Pforta Abbey. In 1305, Kärkna Abbey (also known as Falkenau Abbey) and in 1319 Padise Abbey, both in Estonia, were put under the authority of Stolpe.

In 1534, Stolpe Abbey was dissolved in the course of the Protestant Reformation. The Thirty Years' War made a battleground of Stolpe and left the abbey buildings in ruins.

== See also ==
List of Christian religious houses in Mecklenburg-Vorpommern
