= Pomerania in the High Middle Ages =

Pomerania during the High Middle Ages covers the history of Pomerania in the 12th and 13th centuries.

The early 12th century Obodrite, Polish, Saxon, and Danish conquests resulted in vassalage and Christianization of the formerly pagan and independent Pomeranian tribes. Local dynasties ruled the Principality of Rügen (House of Vitslav), the Duchy of Pomerania (House of Pomerania, "Griffins"), the Lands of Schlawe and Stolp (Ratiboride branch of the Griffins), and the duchies in Pomerelia (Samborides).

The dukes of Pomerania expanded their realm into Circipania and Uckermark to the southwest, and competed with the Kingdom of Poland and the Margraviate of Brandenburg for territory and formal overlordship over their duchies. Pomerania-Demmin lost most of its territory and was integrated into Pomerania-Stettin (Szczecin) in the mid-13th century. When the Ratiborides died out in 1223, competition arose for the Lands of Schlawe and Stolp, which changed hands numerous times.

Starting in the High Middle Ages, an influx of German settlers and the introduction of German law, custom, and Low German language began the process of Germanisation (Ostsiedlung). Many of the people groups that had dominated the area during the Early Middle Ages, such as the Slavic Rani, Lutician and Pomeranian tribes, were assimilated into the new German Pomeranian culture. The Germanisation was not complete, as the Kashubians, descendants of Slavic Pomeranians, dominated many rural areas in Pomerelia, and the eastern part of the region remained Polish. The arrival of German colonists and Germanization mostly affected both the central and local administration.

The conversion of Pomerania to Christianity was achieved primarily by the missionary efforts of Absalon and Otto von Bamberg, by the foundation of numerous monasteries, and through the Christian clergy and settlers. A Pomeranian diocese was set up in Wolin, the see was later moved to Cammin (Kammin, Kamień Pomorski).

== Obodrite realm (1093–1128) ==
After the decline of the Lutician federation and the subsequent expansion of the Obodrite realm into former Lutician areas, and following the victory of Obodrite prince Henry in the Battle of Schmilau in 1093, Helmold of Bosau reported that among others the Luticians, Pomeranians and Rani had to pay tribute to Obodrite prince Henry. The Rani however launched a naval expedition in 1100, in the course of which they sieged Liubice, a predecessor of modern Lübeck and then the Obodrite capitol. This attack was however repulsed, and the Rani became tributary again. After they had killed Henry's son Woldemar and stopped paying tribute, Henry retaliated with two expeditions launched in the winters of 1123/24 and 1124/25, supported by Wendish and Saxon troops. The Rani Svetovit priests were forced to negotiate, and the island was spared only in return for an immense sum which had to be collected from the continental Slavs further east. At this time, Wartislaw I, Duke of Pomerania, was already expanding his realm into Liutician territories south of the Rani. Regrouping after Henry's death (1127), the Rani again assaulted and this time destroyed Liubice in 1128, ending Obodrite influence in the Pomeranian territories.

== As part of Poland (1102/22–1138) ==
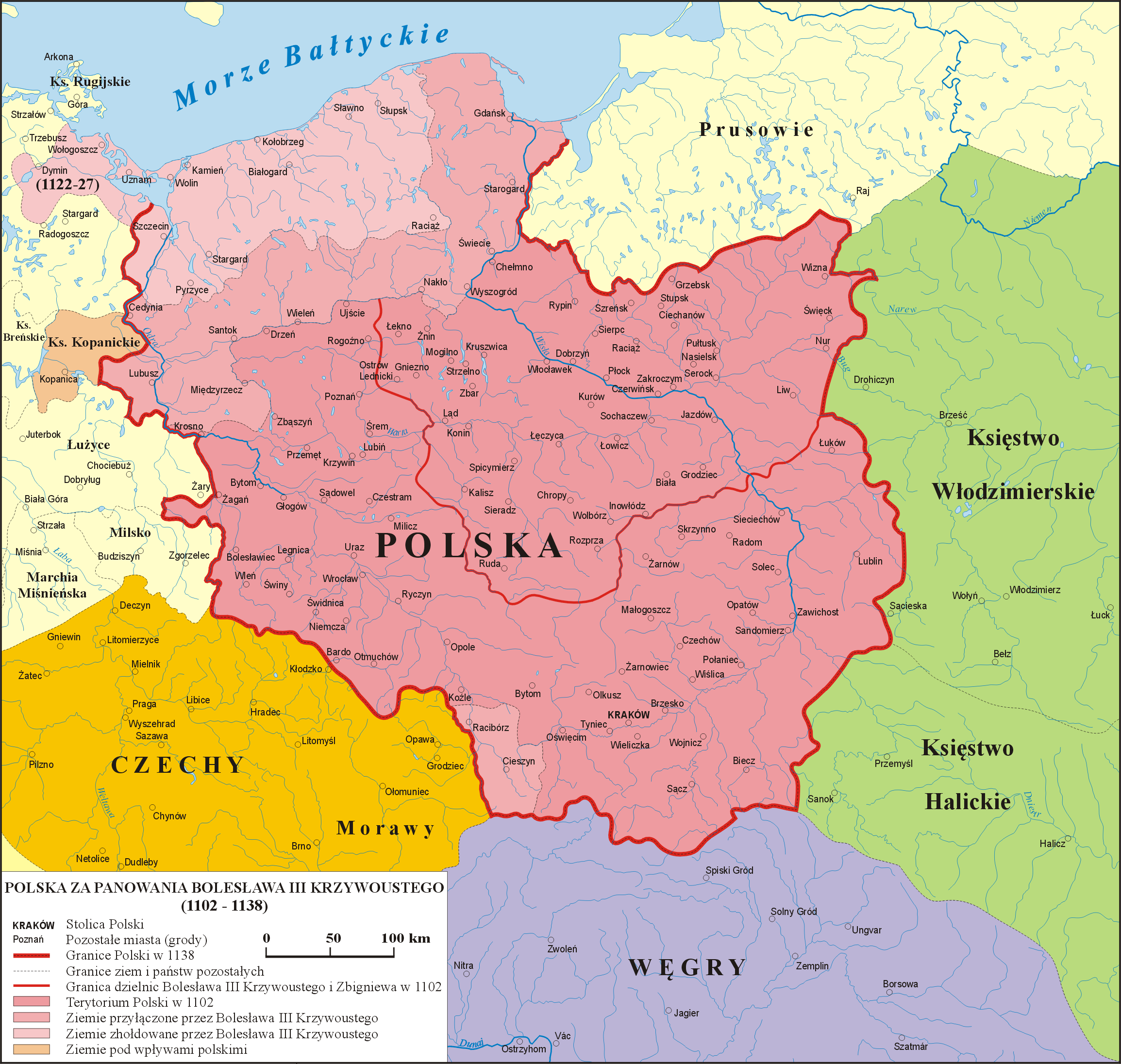
Poland at the time of Bolesław III Wrymouth in 1102-1138, with Pomerania as part of the realm.

In several expeditions mounted between 1102 and 1121, most of Pomerania had been acquired by the Polish duke Bolesław III Wrymouth.

From 1102 to 1109, Bolesław campaigned in the Noteć and Parsęta area. The Pomeranian residence in Białogard was taken already in 1102. From 1112 to 1116, Bolesław took all of Pomerelia. From 1119 to 1122, the area towards the Oder was acquired. Szczecin was taken in the winter of 1121/1122.

The conquest resulted in a high death toll and devastation of vast areas of Pomerania, and the Pomeranian dukes became vassals of Boleslaw III of Poland. Deportations of Pomeranians to Poland took place. The terms of surrender after the Polish conquest were that Wartislaw had to accept Polish sovereignty, convert his people to Christianity, and pay an annual tribute to the Polish duke.

The Annals of Traska report that "Boleslaw III crossed the sea and captured castles." The currently prevailing view is that this mention refers to a campaign in Pomerania, but proposed targets also include the Levant, Denmark and Öland. In Pomerania, Boleslaw's targets may have been Rügen/Rugia, Wolin or Szczecin.

In c. 1130 the conquests of Bolesław III reached the island of Rugia (Rügen), and in 1135 modern Hither Pomerania and Rugia were recognized as a Polish fief.

== Emergence of Pomeranian dynasties - Samborides and Griffins ==
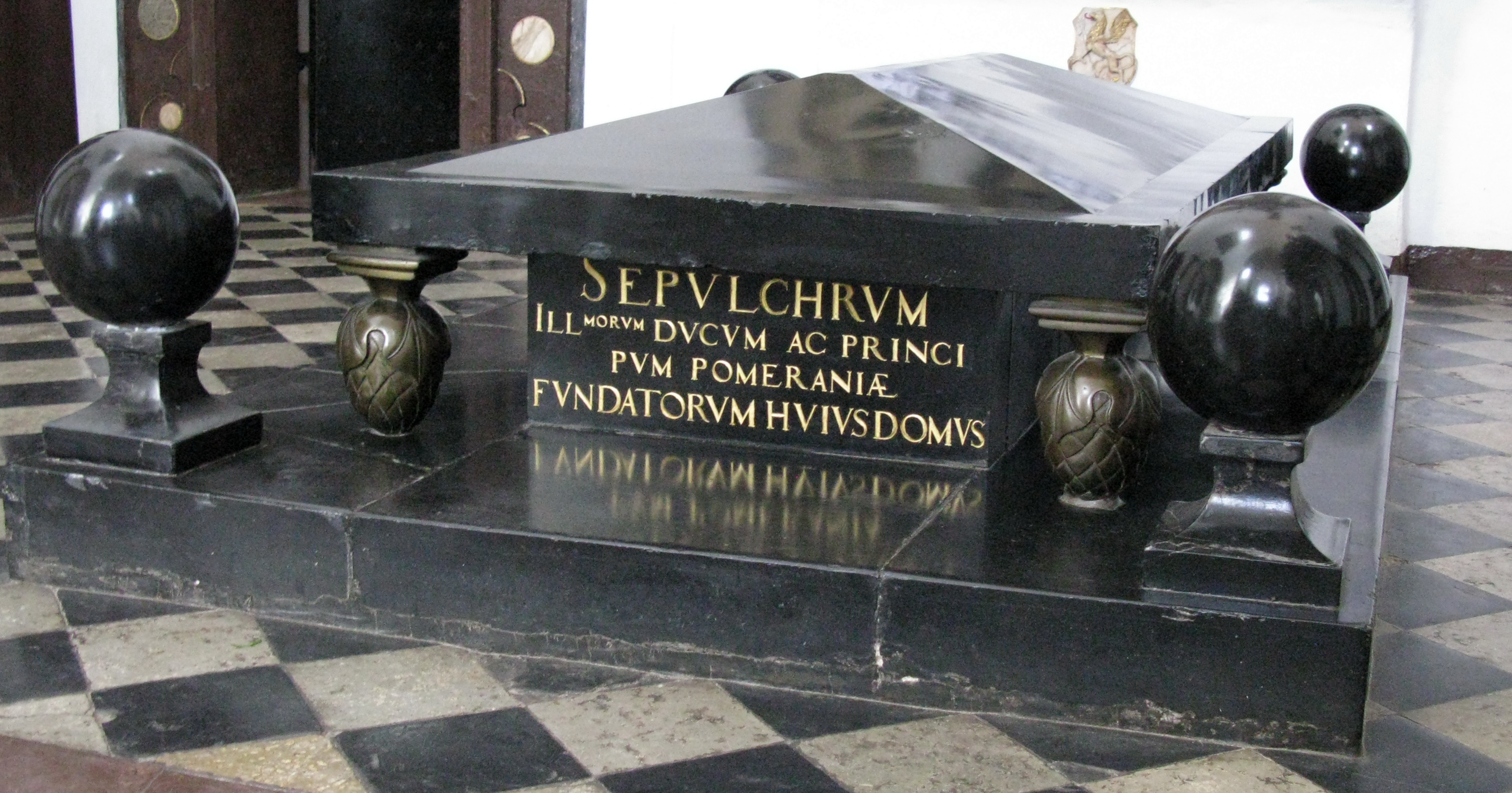
Tomb of the medieval dukes of Gdańsk Pomerania of the House of Sobiesław with the Latin name Pomerania at the Oliwa Cathedral in Gdańsk

Pomerelia, initially under Polish control, was ruled by the Samborides dynasty from 1227 until 1294. The duchy was split temporarily into districts of Gdańsk, Białogarda, Świecie and Lubieszewo–Tczew .

In Pomerania proper, Polish rule ended with Boleslaw III's death in 1138. The Słupsk and Sławno areas (Lands of Schlawe and Stolp were ruled by Ratibor I and his descendants (Ratiboriden branch of the Griffin House of Pomerania) until the Danish occupation and extinction of the Ratiboride branch in 1227.

The areas stretching from Kołobrzeg to Szczecin were ruled by Ratibor's brother Wartislaw I and his descendants (House of Pomerania, also called Griffins, of which he was the first ascertained ancestor) until the 1630s.

== Conversion of Pomerania ==
The first attempt to convert the Pomeranians to Christianity following the acquisition of Pomerania by Boleslaw III of Poland was made in 1122. The Spanish monk Bernard (also Bernhard) travelled to Jumne (Wolin), accompanied only by his chaplain and an interpreter. The Pomeranians however were not impressed by his missionary efforts and finally threw him out of town. Bernard was later made bishop of Lubusz.

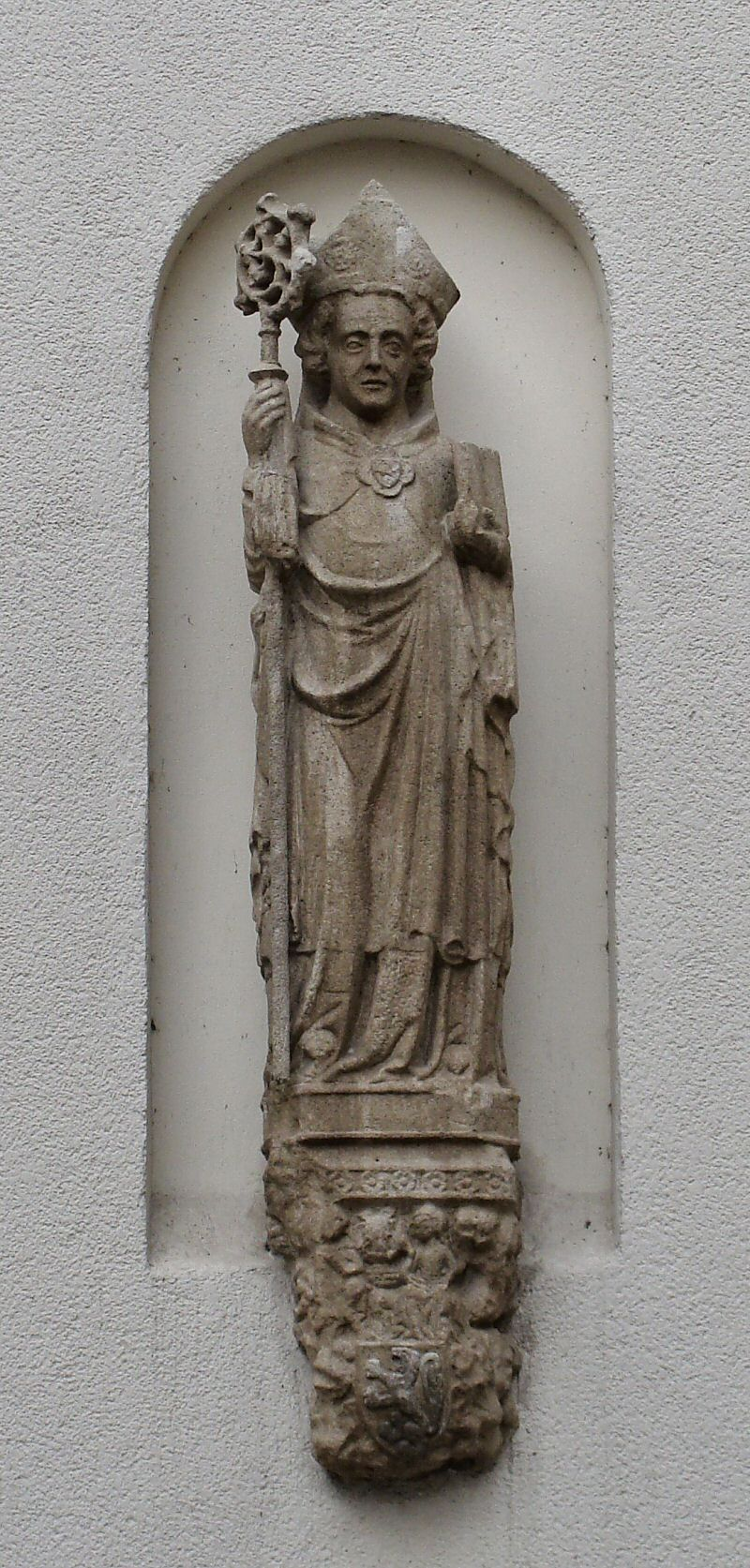
Statue of Otto of Bamberg at the Ducal Castle in Szczecin

After Bernard's misfortune, Boleslaw III asked Otto of Bamberg to convert Pomerania to Christianity, which he accomplished in his first visit in 1124/25. Otto's strategy severely differed from the one Bernard used: While Bernard travelled alone and as a poor and unknown priest, Otto, a wealthy and famous man, was accompanied by 20 clergy of his own diocese, numerous servants, 60 warriors supplied to him by Boleslaw, and carried with him numerous supplies and gifts. After arriving in Pyrzyce, the Pomeranians were assured that Otto's aim was not the gain of wealth at the expense of the Pomeranian people, as he was wealthy already, but only to convert them to Christianity, which would protect the Pomeranians from further punishment by God, as which the devastating Polish conquest was depicted. This approach turned out to be successful, and was backed by parts of the Pomeranian nobility that in part was Christian raised already, like duke Wartislaw, who encouraged and promoted Otto's mission. Many Pomeranians were baptized already in Pyrzyce and also in the other burghs visited. Afterwards, also Kamień, Szczecin and Wolin accepted Christianity, however, the two latter cities only after Bolesław III intervened and promised to reduce taxes.

At this first mission, Otto founded at least eleven churches, two of those each in Szczecin and Wolin. In Szczecin and Wolin, some locals still tried to fight Christianization.

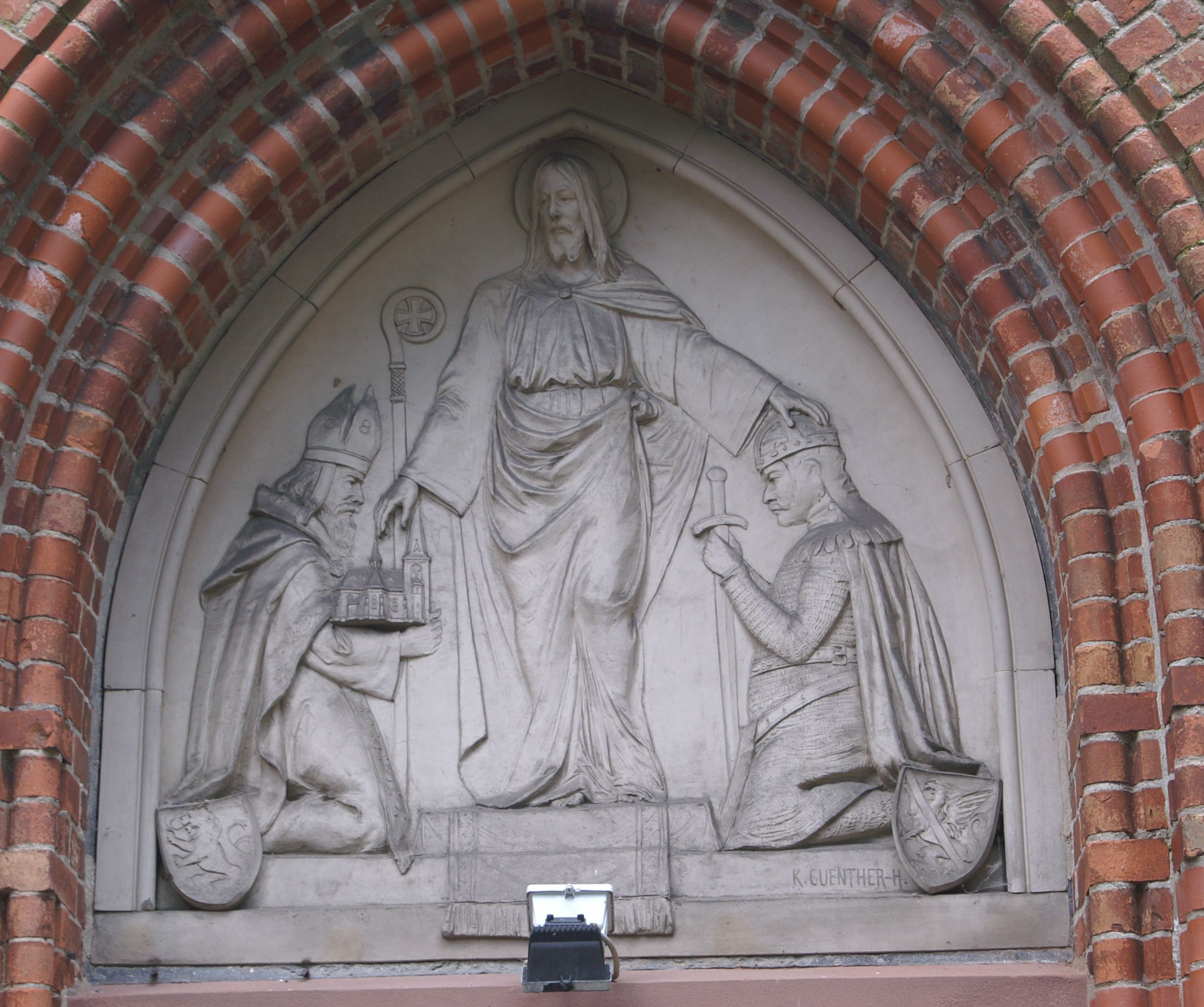
Conversion of Pomerania, depicted in Stolpe's Wartislaw Memorial Church

Otto of Bamberg returned in 1128, this time invited by duke Wartislaw himself, aided by the emperor Holy Roman Emperor Lothair III, to convert the Slavs of Western Pomerania just incorporated into the Pomeranian duchy, and to strengthen the Christian faith of the inhabitants of Szczecin and Wolin, who fell back into heathen practices and idolatry. Otto this time visited primarily Western Pomeranian burghs, had the temples of Gützkow and Wolgast torn down and on their sites erected the predecessors of today's St. Nicholas and St. Peter churches, respectively, before turning to Kamień, Wolin and Szczecin. The nobility assembled to a congress in Usedom, at which they accepted Christianity on 10 June 1128. Otto then was titled apostolus gentis Pomeranorum, made a saint by pope Clement III in 1189, and was worshiped in Pomerania even after the Protestant Reformation.

Holy Roman Emperor Lothair claimed the areas west of the Oder for his empire. Thus the terms of Otto's second mission were not negotiated with Boleslaw III of Poland, but with Lothar and Wartislaw. However Lothair terminated the mission in the fall of 1128, probably because he distrusted Otto's contacts with Boleslaw. Otto visited Gniezno on his way back to Bamberg.

Adalbert of Pomerania, the later Pomeranian bishop, participated in Otto's mission as an interpreter and assistant.

The priests of the numerous gods worshipped before the conversion were one of the most powerful class in the early medieval society. Their reaction to the Christianization of Pomerania was ambiguous: In 1122, they saved missionary Bernhard's life by declaring him insane, otherwise he would have been killed in Wolin. On the other hand, Otto of Bamberg's mission was a far larger threat to the established pagan tradition, and eventually it succeeded in Christianization of the region. There are reports of unsuccessful assassination attempts made against Otto of Bamberg by the pagan priesthood. Following Otto's success, some of the pagan priests were crucified, while it is unknown what happened to the others. It has been speculated that they adapted to the new reality.

All of Pomerania from the Oder to the Vistula was under the ecclesiastical administration of the Polish Archdiocese of Gniezno until 1123/c. 1140, when new dioceses were founded.

=== Pomeranian diocese (1140) ===
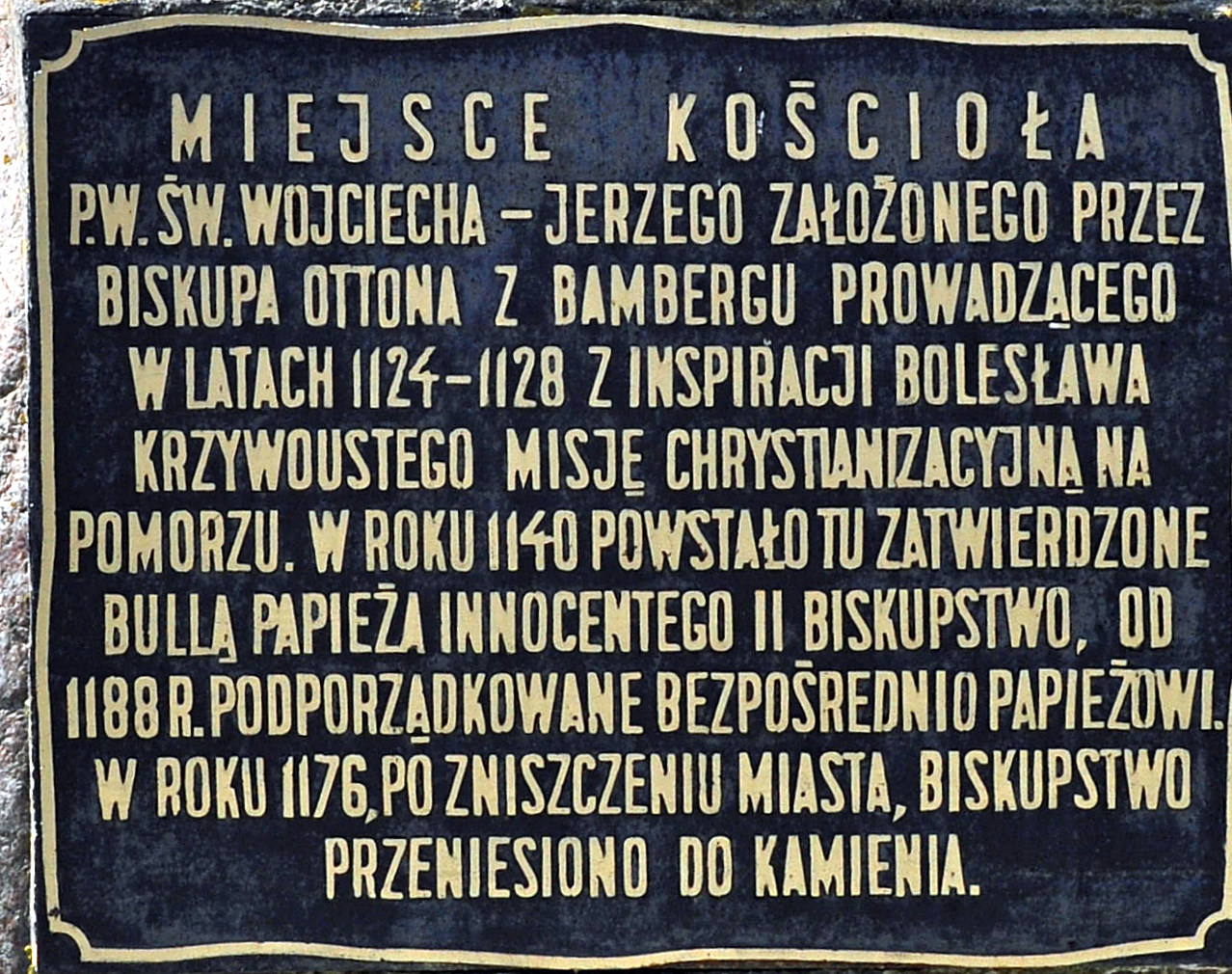
Plaque at the site of the first cathedral in Wolin

On Otto of Bamberg's behalf, a diocese was founded with the see in Wolin (Julin, Jumne, Vineta), a major Slavic and Viking town in the Oder estituary. On 14 October 1140 Adalbert of Pomerania was made the first Bishop by Pope Innocent II. Otto however had died the year before. There was a rivalry between Otto's Diocese of Bamberg, the Diocese of Magdeburg and the Archdiocese of Gniezno for the incorporation of Pomerania. Pope Innocence II solved the dispute by repelling their claims and placed the new diocese directly under his Holy See. The see of the diocese was the church of St Adalbert in Wolin. The diocese had no clear-cut borders in the beginning, but roughly reached from the Tribsees burgh in the West to the Łeba River in the East. In the South, it comprised the northern parts of Uckermark and Neumark. As such, it was shaped after the territory held by Ratibor I, Duke of Pomerania.

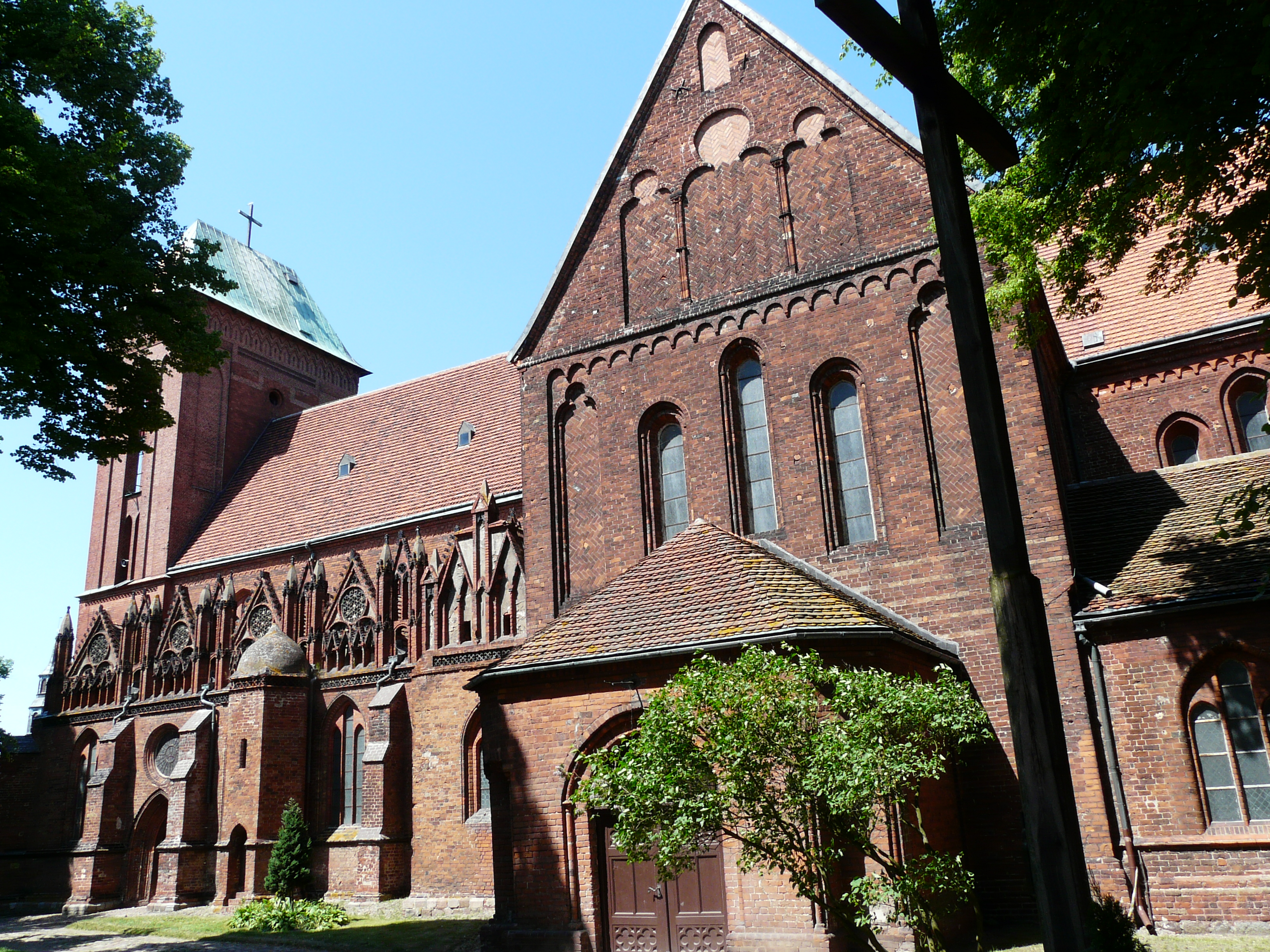
Cathedral, Kamień Pomorski, a Historic Monument of Poland

After ongoing Danish raids, Wollin was destroyed, and the see of the diocese was shifted across the Dziwna to Kamień Pomorski's St John's church in 1176. This was confirmed by the pope in 1186. In the early 13th century, the Kamień diocese along with the Pomeranian dukes gained control over Circipania. Also, the bishops managed to gain direct control over a territory around Kołobrzeg and Koszalin.

In the 12th century, the Pomerelian areas were integrated into the Polish Diocese of Włocławek, based in Kuyavia, a region neighbouring with Pomerelia in the south. In the early 13th century, Słupsk and Sławno passed from the ecclesiastical administration of the Bishopric of Kamień to the Archdiocese of Gniezno, within which an archdeaconry was established with its seat in Słupsk. The Słupsk archdeaconry existed until 1317, when the city passed again to the ecclesiastical administration of the Diocese of Kamień.

=== Monasteries ===
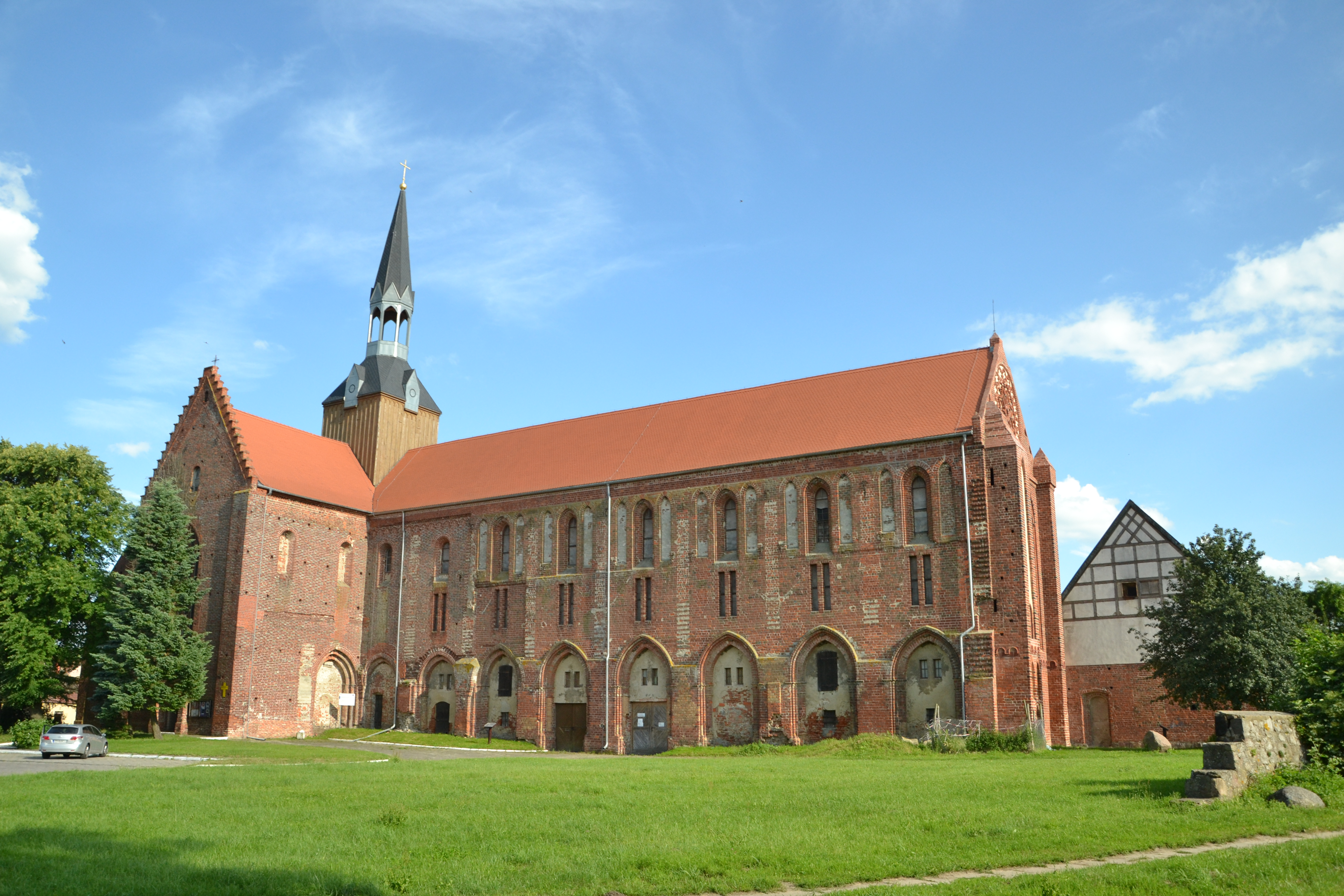
Kołbacz Abbey, a Historic Monument of Poland

After the successful conversion of the nobility, monasteries were set up on vast areas granted by local dukes both to further implement Christian faith and to develop the land. The monasteries actively took part in the Ostsiedlung. Most of the clergy originated in Germany, some in Poland, and since the mid-12th century also from Denmark.

The Cistercian monasteries in Kołbacz, Oliwa and Pelplin, founded in 1173, 1188 and 1274, respectively, are listed as Historic Monuments of Poland.

=== Wendish Crusade (1147) ===
In 1147, the Wendish Crusade, a campaign of the Northern Crusades, was mounted by bishops and nobles of the Holy Roman Empire and Poland. The crusaders ravaged the land and laid siege to Demmin and Szczecin despite them (officially) being already Christian. Wolin's bishop Adalbert took part in the negotiations that finally led to the lifting of the Szczecin siege by the crusaders. Ratibor I, Duke of Pomerania, went to the Imperial Diet in Havelberg the following year, where he swore to be a Christian.

== Partition of 1155 - Pomerania-Demmin and Pomerania-Stettin ==
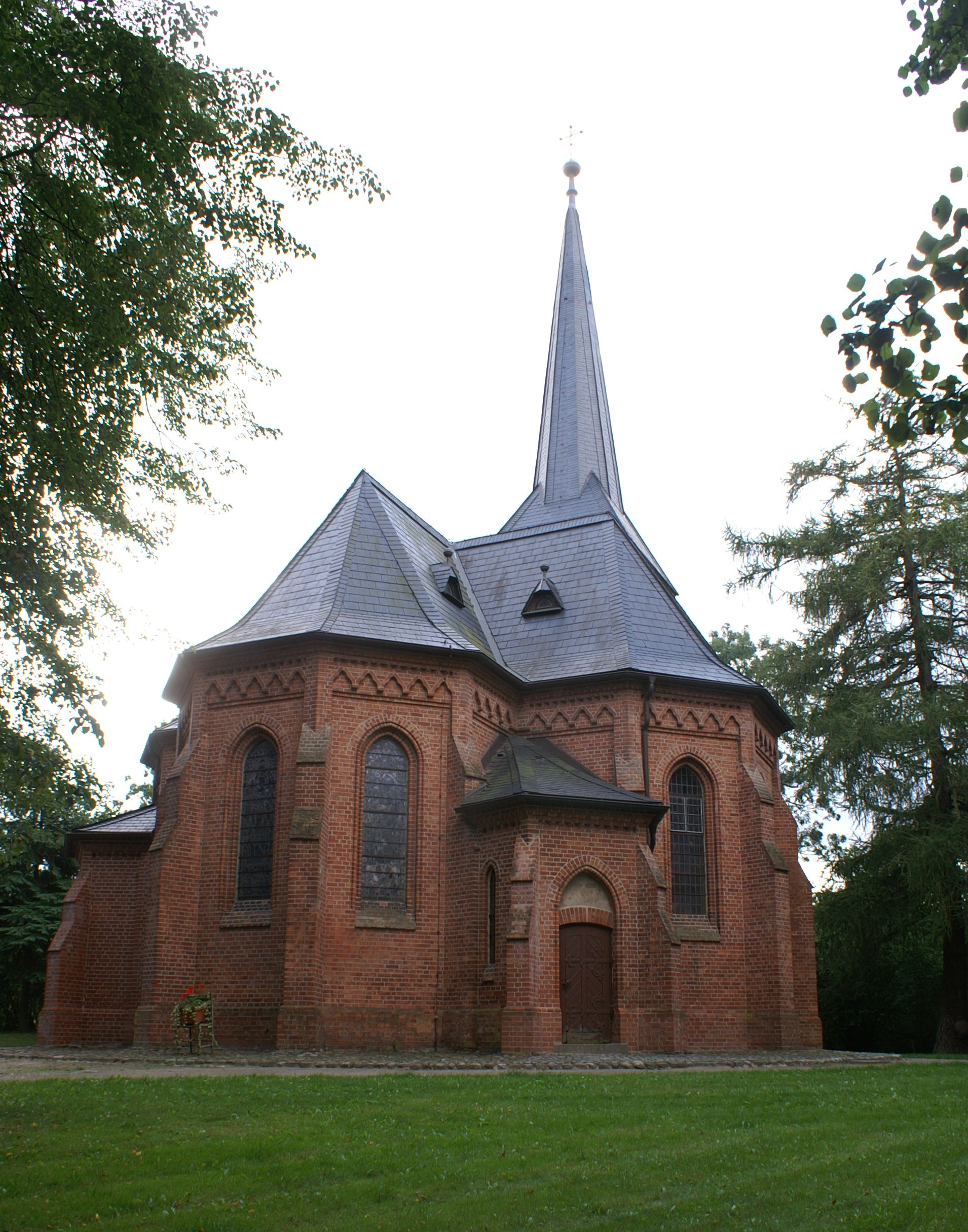
Wartislaw Memorial Church, Stolpe. Ratibor also founded Stolpe Abbey in Wartislaw's memorial.

Wartislaw I died between 1134 and 1148. His brother Ratibor I, duke in the Słupsk and Sławno Land, ruled in place of Wartislaw's sons, Bogislaw I and Casimir I until his death in about 1155. Then the duchy was split into Pomerania-Demmin, ruled by Casimir, including the upper Peene, Tollense, Dziwna and Rega areas, and Pomerania-Szczecin, ruled by Bogislaw, including the lower Peene, Uecker, Oder, and Ina areas. The Kołobrzeg area was ruled in common as a codominion.

== Westward expansion of Wartislaw I ==
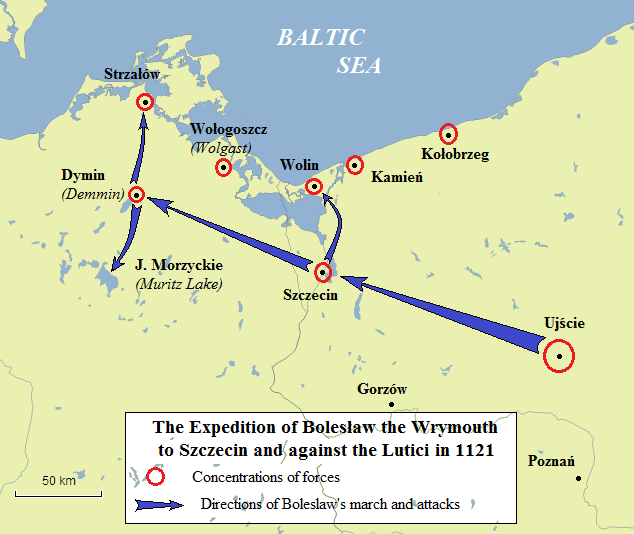
The expedition of Boleslaw III of Poland to Szczecin and east of the Oder to subjugate the Slavic Lutici, in 1121.

In the meantime, Wartislaw managed to conquer territories west of the Oder river, an area inhabited by Lutici tribes weakened by past warfare, and included these territories into his Duchy of Pomerania. Already in 1120, he had expanded west into the areas near the Oder Lagoon and Peene river. Most notably Demmin, the Principality of Gützkow and Wolgast were conquered in the following years.

The major stage of the westward expansion into Lutici territory occurred between Otto of Bamberg's two missions, 1124 and 1128. In 1128, Demmin, the County of Gützkow and Wolgast were already incorporated into Wartislaw I's realm, yet warfare was still going on. Captured Lutici and other war loot, including livestock, money, and clothes were apportioned among the victorious. After Wartislaw's Lutician conquests, his duchy lay between the Bay of Greifswald to the north, Circipania, including Güstrow, to the west, Kolberg/Kołobrzeg in the east, and possibly as far as the Havel and Spree rivers in the south.

After the conquests, Wartislaw's realm stretched from the Bay of Greifswald in the North and Circipania with Güstrow in the West to the Havel and possibly also the Spree rivers in the South and the Kolobrzeg area in the east.

These gains were not subject to Polish over lordship, but were placed under over lordship of Nordmark margrave Albert the Bear, who according to Bialecki was a dedicated enemy of Slavs, by Lothair III, Holy Roman Emperor. Thus, the western territories contributed to making Wartislaw significantly independent from the Polish dukes. Wartislaw was not the only one campaigning in these areas. The Polish duke Boleslaw III, during his Pomeranian campaign launched an expedition into the Müritz area in 1120/21, before he turned back to subdue Wartislaw. The later Holy Roman Emperor Lothair III (then Saxon duke Lothair I of Supplinburg) in 1114 initiated large scale campaigns against the local Lutici tribes resulting in their final defeat in 1228. Also, the territories were invaded by Danish forces multiple times, who, coming from the Baltic Sea, used the rivers Peene and Uecker to advance to a line Demmin–Pasewalk. At different times, Pomeranians, Saxons and Danes were either allies or opponents. The Pomeranian dukes consolidated their power in the course of the 12th century, yet the preceding warfare had left these territories completely devastated.

== Society under Wartislaw I ==
During Wartislaw I's rule society was composed of the Pomeranian freeman and the slaves, who consisted mostly of Wendish, German or Danish war captives. The freemen generally made their living from agriculture, fishing and husbandry, as well as hunting and trade. Their social status depended both on accumulated wealth as well as noble status. The proportion of slaves in the total population of the area was relatively small and in fact the Pomeranians exported slaves to Poland.

The largest settlements were Wolin and Szczecin, each of which had a few thousand inhabitants, and a biweekly market day. While some historians address these settlements as towns, this is rejected by others due to the differences to later towns. They are usually referred to as early towns, proto-towns, castle towns or emporia; their Slavic designation was *grod (gard in Pomeranian and Polabian language). (Note: In German historiography, larger pre-Ostsiedlung settlements comprising castles and suburbia are usually termed Burgstadt (lit. "castle town"), in contrast to the earlier emporia (Seehandelsplätze) at the Baltic coast and the later Rechtsstadt (lit. "law town") or communal town; both Burgstadt and emporia are also described as Frühstadt (lit. "early town"). The contemporary Slavic cognate of Burgstadt was *grod Pomeranian and Polabian: gard, it resembled the contemporary West European vicus and villa in structure and layout, but not the West European civitas markets. In Slavic-speaking regions, Ostsiedlung narrowed the meaning of *grod to denote the castles only, while towns were termed *město (orig. "site", [cf. Polish miast]; in areas not affected by Ostsiedlung, towns were termed *grod, cf. Russian город). Brather, Sebastian (2001). Archäologie der westlichen Slawen. Siedlung, Wirtschaft und Gesellschaft im früh- und hochmittelalterlichen Ostmitteleuropa. de Gruyter. pp. 141f., 148, 154–155. ISBN 3-11-017061-2. Medieval Latin lacked a dedicated term for the Burgstadt settlements, contemporary documents refer to them as civitates, oppida or urbes Brachmann, Hansjürgen (1995). "Von der Burg zur Stadt. Die Frühstadt in Ostmitteleuropa". Archaeologia Historica. 20: 315–321, 315. Schich (2007) rejected a proposal of Stoob (1986) to discontinue the use of compound words including "town" for these places, such as Protostadt (lit. "proto town"), Burgstadt, Frühstadt and Stoob's own, earlier proposal Grodstadt (lit. "grod town"). Stoob says that this would unjustifiably suggest a relation to the high medieval towns. Schich says that "if - despite the undisputable break in the 'urban' development in this area - terms like Burgstadt and Frühstadt are used here, then this is based on a broader [...] understanding of the term 'town.' Frühstadt then denotes an early form of town-like settlements preceding the high medieval towns, without insinuating an evolution from Burgstadt or Frühstadt to the communal town." Schich, Winfried (2007). Schich, Winfried; Neumeister, Peter (eds.). Wirtschaft und Kulturlandschaft. BWV Verlag. p. 266. ISBN 978-3-8305-0378-1. Cf. also Benl, R, in Buchholz (1999), p. 75.) The population of Pomerania was relatively wealthy in comparison to her neighbors, owing to abundant land, inter-regional trade and piracy.

Wartislaw's power and standing differed depending on the area. In the east of his duchy (Kamień Pomorski, Białogard, and Kołobrzeg area) his power was strongest, tribal assemblies are not documented. In the center (Wolin, Szczecin, and Pyrzyce area) Wartislaw had to yield the decisions of the local population and nobility. In the towns, Wartislaw maintained small courts. Every decision of Wartislaw had to pass an assembly of the elders and an assembly of the free. In the newly gained Lutici territories of the West, Wartislaw managed to establish a rule that resembled his rule in the eastern parts, but also negotiated with the nobility.

== Pomeranian expeditions to Scandinavia ==
In 1134, Pomeranian troops invaded Denmark and even looted Roskilde, then the Danish capital. In 1135, Norwegian Konghelle was attacked and sacked.

== Saxon conquest (1164) ==
The Griffin dukes of Pomerania sought Polish support against Germans and Danes, but Poland, weakened due to its fragmentation into smaller principalities after 1138, could not provide it.

In the West, bishops and dukes of the Holy Roman Empire mounted expeditions to Pomerania. Most notable for the further fate of Pomerania are the 1147 Wendish Crusade and the 1164 Battle of Verchen, the Pomeranian dukes became vassals of Henry the Lion, of Saxony. Circipania came under control of the Pomeranian dukes at about this time. Despite this vassalage, Henry again sieged Demmin in 1177 when he allied with the Danes, but reconciled with the Pomeranian dukes thereafter.

== Danish conquests (1168–1185) ==
From the North, Denmark attacked Pomerania. Several campaigns throughout the 12th century (in 1136, 1150, 1159 and throughout the 1160s) culminated in the defeat of the Principality of Rugia in 1168.

=== Conquest and conversion of the Rugian principality (1168) ===
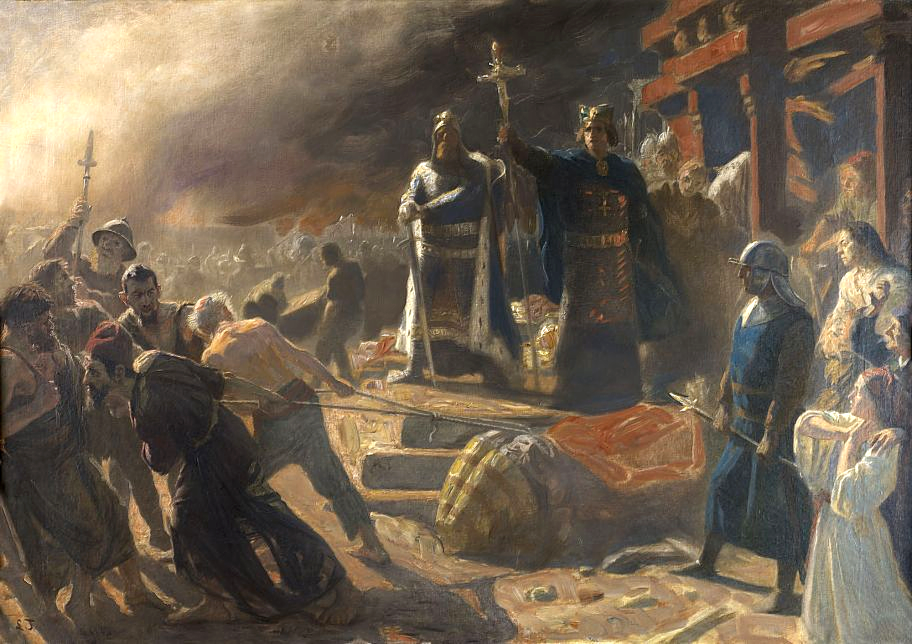
Bishop Absalon topples the god Svetovit at Arkona, by Laurits Tuxen

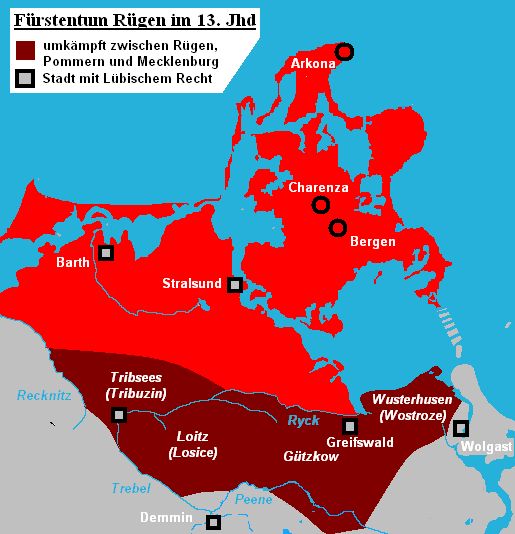
Principality of Rugia, 13th century

The island of Rügen and the surrounding areas between the Recknitz, Peene and Ryck rivers were the settlement area of the West Slavic Rani (or Rujani) tribe. After Otto von Bamberg's mission, only the Rani principality of Rugia (Rügen) remained pagan. This was changed by a Danish expedition of 1168, launched by Valdemar I of Denmark and Absalon, archbishop of Roskilde. The Danish success in this expedition ended a series of conflicts between Denmark and Rügen. The Rügen princes, starting with Jaromar I, became vassals of Denmark, and the principality would be Denmark's bridgehead on the southern shore of the Baltic for the next centuries. The 1168 expedition was decided when after a Danish siege of the burgh of Arkona, a fire broke out leaving the defendants unable to further withstand the siege. Since Arkona was the major temple of the superior god Svetovit and therefore crucial for the powerful clerics, the Rani surrendered their other strongholds and temples without further fighting. Absalon had the Rani hand out and burn the wooden statues of their gods and integrated Rügen in the Diocese of Roskilde. The mainland of the Rügen principality was integrated into the Diocese of Schwerin.

=== Danish conquest of all Pomerania (1170–1185) ===
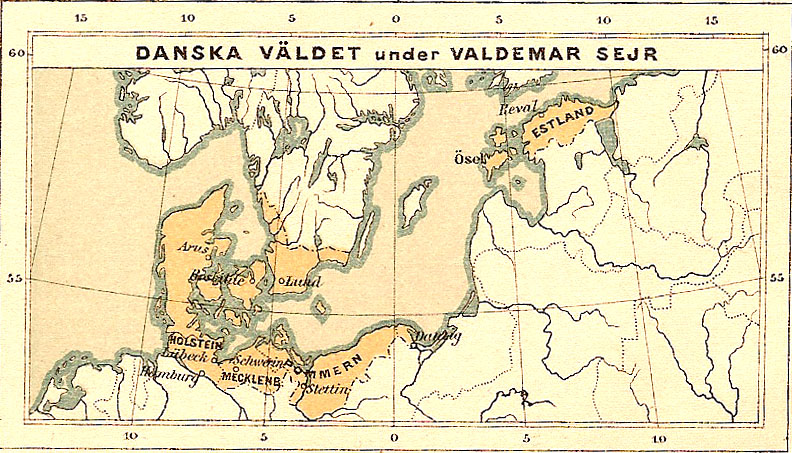
Pomerania as a part of Denmark under Valdemar II (nicknamed "Sejr", "the Victorious")

When the Rugian princes became vassals of Valdemar I of Denmark in 1168, the Saxon-Danish alliance broke apart.

In the fall of 1170, the Danes raided the Oder estituary. In 1171, the Danes raided Circipania and took Cotimar's burgh in Behren-Lübchin. In 1173, the Danes turned to the Oder Lagoon again, taking the burgh of Szczecin. Wartislaw II Swantiboriz, castellan of Szczecin, became a Danish vassal. In 1177, the Danes again raided the Oder Lagoon area, also the burgh of Wolgast in 1178.

In 1184, Bogislaw I led the Pomeranian navy towards Rügen. On emperor Barbarossa's initiative, Bogislaw was to take the Principality of Rügen from the Danes, whose king Canut VI had refused him the oath of fealty. Though superior in numbers, the Pomeranian navy was utterly defeated by the Danish navy led by Absalon near Koos island in the Bay of Greifswald.

In 1184 and 1185, three campaigns of the Danes resulted in making Bogislaw I, Duke of Pomerania a Danish vassal. These campaigns were mounted by Valdemar's son and successor for the Danish throne, Canute VI of Denmark. In the Duchy of Pomerania the Danish period lasted until Valdemar II of Denmark lost the Battle of Bornhöved on 22 July 1227. Danish supremacy prevailed until 1325 in the Rugian principality. During this time, the emperor formally renounced his claims on the southern Baltic Sea in favour of Denmark.

== Holy Roman Empire (1181) ==
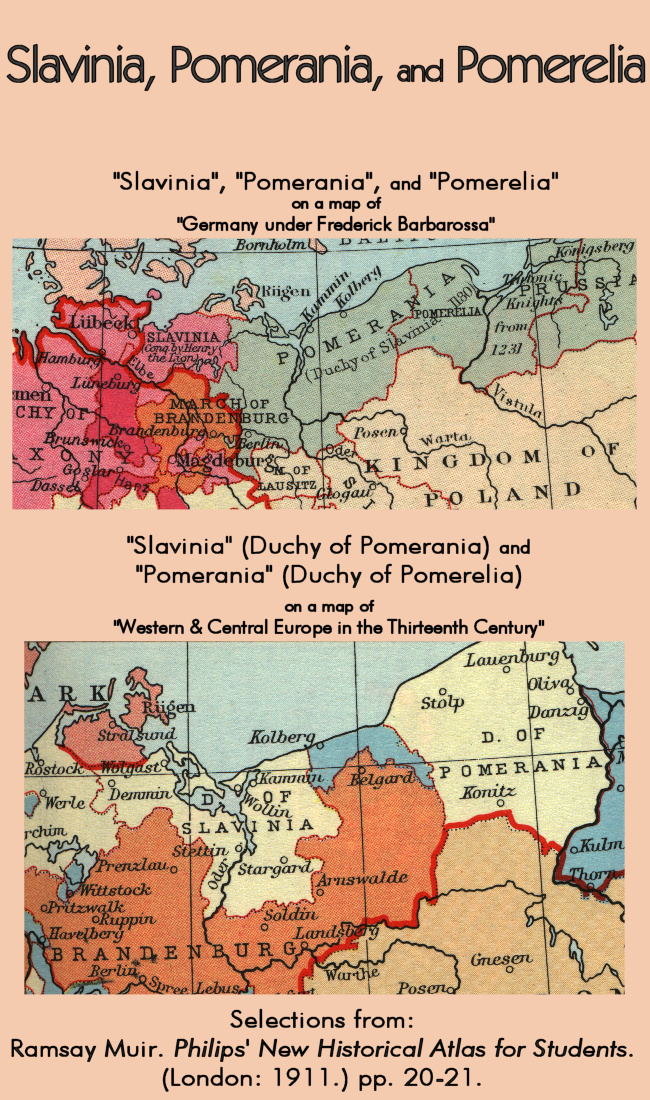
Pomerania in the 12th and 13th centuries

Following internal struggles, Henry the Lion fell against Holy Roman Emperor Frederick Barbarossa in 1181. Bogislaw I took his duchy as a fief directly from Barbarossa in the same year.

At that time, the duchy was also referred to as Slavinia (German: Slawien) (yet this was a term applied to several Wendish areas such as Mecklenburg and the Principality of Rügen). The duchy remained in the Empire, although Denmark managed to take control of the southern Baltic including the Duchy of Pomerania from the 1180s until the 1227 Battle of Bornhöved.

== Society in the late 12th and early 13th centuries ==
While in the early 12th century most of the Pomeranians were free, by the late 12th century only the nobility and knights remained free. They were free in their decisions concerning their property and actions, though formally they had to apply for the duke's support.

The class of the unfree still consisted of prisoners of war, but additionally one became unfree after conviction of a major criminal offense or if one was unable to pay one's debts. The unfree made up for an estimated 15% of the population and primarily had to work on the lands of the free.

Most of the population of this time was largely dependent on the duke. This dependency could also result in becoming dependent on a person other than the duke, if the duke granted parts of his lands including the population thereon to a noble, a church, or a monastery. This class shared certain obligations and restrictions with the unfree, for example a head tax, and a restricted right to marry.

Their major obligations were participation in the duke's military campaigns, defense of the duchy, erection and maintenance of the ducal buildings (burghs, courts, bridges), to hand over horses, oxen, and carriages to the duke or his officials on demand, to host and to cater the duke or his officials on demand, to supply rations for the duke's journeys, a periodic tribute in form of a fixed amount of meat and wheat, and also a church tax ("biskopownica", since 1170 "Garbenzehnt").

== German settlement ==
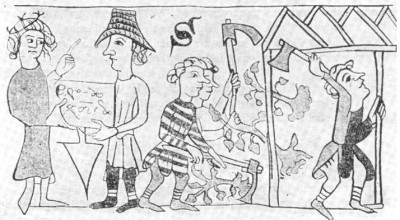
Ostsiedlung illustrated in the Sachsenspiegel. The man with the hat is the lokator, who recruited the settlers (right) for the landlord (left) and oversaw the construction of the town or village in turn for an elevated administrative position.

Beginning in the 12th century, on the initiative of monasteries, as well as the local nobility, German settlers began migrating to Pomerania in a process later termed the Ostsiedlung. The local nobles and rulers encouraged the settlement in order to strengthen and consolidate their position and to develop and intensify land use, while the settlers were attracted by the privileges that were granted to them.

Through a process that spanned three hundred years, in western Pomerania the local Slavic population was mostly assimilated, while in the eastern part, Slavic Kashubians and Slovincians held on to their ethnic culture and identity.

=== Rural settlement ===
Before the Ostsiedlung, Pomerania was rather sparsely settled. Around 1200, a relatively dense population could be found on the islands of Rügen, Usedom and Wolin, around the gards of Szczecin, Koszalin, Pyrzyce and Stargard, around the Parsęta river (Kołobrzeg area), the lower Peene river, and between Sławno and the Łeba valley. Largely unsettled were the hilly regions and the woods in the South. The 12th century warfare, especially the Danish raids, depopulated many areas of Pomerania and caused severe population drops in others (e.g. Usedom). At the turn to the 13th century, only isolated German settlements existed, e.g. Hohenkrug and other German villages, and the merchant's settlement near the Szczecin castle. In contrast, the monasteries were almost exclusively run by Germans and Danes.

The first German and Danish settlers arrived since the 1170s and settled in the Peene area, the Uckermark, the Szczecin area and southern Pomerania.

Significant German settlement started in the first half of the 13th century. Ostsiedlung was a common process at this time in all Central Europe and was largely run by the nobles and monasteries to increase their income. Also, the settlers were expected to finish and secure the conversion of the non-nobles to Christianity. In addition, the Danes withdrew from most of Pomerania in 1227, leaving the duchy vulnerable to their expansive neighbors, especially Mecklenburg, Brandenburg, and Henry I of Silesia.

Besides the Slovincian area, the last records of a Slavic language in the Duchy of Pomerania are from the 16th century: In the Oder area, a few Slavic fishing villages are recorded, and east of Kolberg (Kołobrzeg) and Köslin (Koszalin), a more numerous Slavic-speaking population must have existed, as can be concluded from a 1516 decree forbidding the use of the Slavic language at the Köslin market.

=== Foundation of towns ===
Before the Ostsiedlung, urban settlements of the emporia and gard types existed, for example the city of Szczecin which counted between 5,000 and 9,000 inhabitants, and other locations like Demmin, Wolgast, Usedom, Wolin, Kołobrzeg, Pyrzyce and Stargard, though many of the coastal ones declined during the 12th century warfare. Previous theories that urban development was "in its entirety" brought to areas such as Pomerania, Mecklenburg or Poland by Germans are now discarded, and studies show that these areas had already growing urban centres in process similar to Western Europe These population centres were usually centered on a gard, which was a fortified castle which housed the castellan as well as his staff and the ducal craftsmen. The surrounding town consisted of suburbs, inhabited by merchants, clergy and the higher nobles. According to Piskorski this portion usually included "markets, taverns, butcher shops, mints, which also exchanged coins, toll stations, abbeys, churches and the houses of nobles".

Important changes connected to Ostsiedlung included

- location: All Ostsiedlung towns in Pomerania except for Szczecin, Wolin and probably Kamień were founded on empty space, even if they were located near Slavic settlements. Piskorski (1997) says that for the towns with a Slavic predecessor, "usually, the settlement from the west did not only mean granting German law and a new administration, but also the shift of the old settlement location, because the new German-law town emerged not at the place, but in the vicinity of the old center, whereby sometimes the distance between them was several kilometers as e.g. in the case of Pomeranian Kolberg." By leaving the Slavic settlement untouched, the landlord not only avoided dealing with complicated property rights inside, but also kept the services and income generated by its dependent population. Piskorski also says there were isolated exceptions as in the case of Szczecin and Wolin, where pre-existing settlements were integrated into the new town: "In such cases, the old settlements were surveyed anew and built anew." Benl (1999) likewise says that Wolin and probably Kamień Pomorski were exceptional in that they were built on the spot of former, yet decayed settlements, and that Szczecin was exceptional in that two German settlements, set up close to the Slavic castle and settlement, were included in the later town. Likewise, Mangelsdorf (1990) says that the cities in Mecklenburg-Vorpommern "have their roots in the slavonic period, and usually came up near a slavonic castle or settlement with a commercial background." Mangelsdorf further says that "new in-town excavations illustrate the connection between slavonic and german settlements and the influence of material culture. [...] Slavic material culture, especially pottery, died [...] in Mecklenburg-Antepomerania at the end of the 13th century."
- population: Germans formed a majority in the towns from the beginning. They moved in either directly from the West or from the surrounding areas. People of Slavic descent also lived in the towns, but primarily in suburbs (Wieken) outside the walls, which were either continuations of pre-existing Slavic settlements (many of those were soon abandoned) or new foundations owned by the landlord. Since around 1300, the towns acquired these Wieken. A small number of Jews also settled in medieval Pomeranian towns.
- legal status: Prior to the Ostsiedlung, all inhabitants of the duchy were subject to ducal law, meaning that distinct sets of laws were applied to individuums according to their descent, regardless whether they lived in large or small settlements. In contrast, German town law was granted to the inhabitants of Ostsiedlung towns, making their inhabitants personally free and subject to the town's jurisdiction. This however did not apply to resident clergymen and vassals of the duke. Many towns were able to expand the privileges and freedoms gained by their foundation in the following years.
- social differentiation: The upper class in the Ostsiedlung towns were the patricians, who were primarily occupied with long-distance trade and dominated the town's council.
- layout: The towns were set up with regular streets resembling a checkerboard-like pattern. The shape of the town was either oval (e.g. Bahn), rectangular with rounded corners (e.g. Greifenhagen) or rectangular (e.g. Treptow); Altdamm was built in a circular and Pyritz in a triangular shape. In the center was the market place with the townhall.

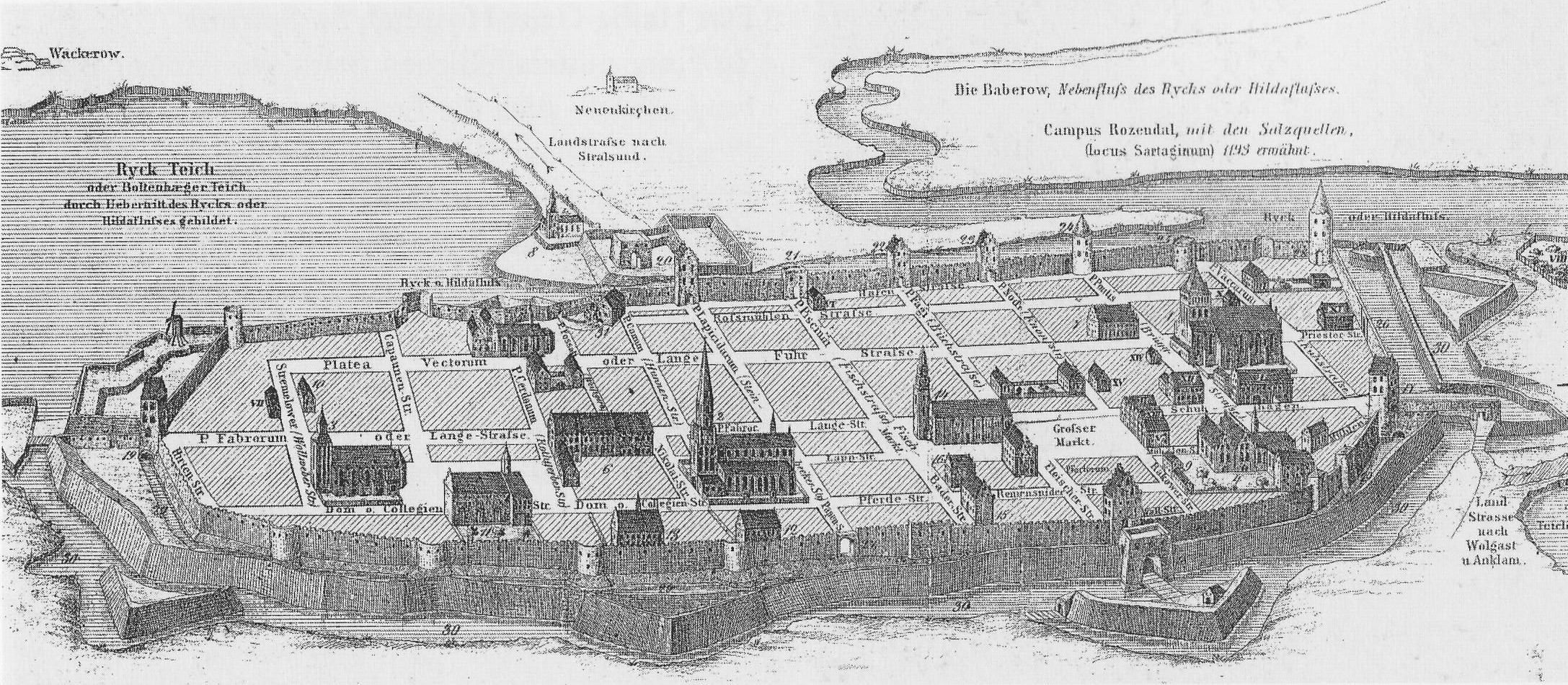
Medieval Greifswald with the checkerboard-type layout typical for Ostsiedlung towns. Locators set up rectangular blocs in an area resembling an oval with a central market, and organized the settlement.

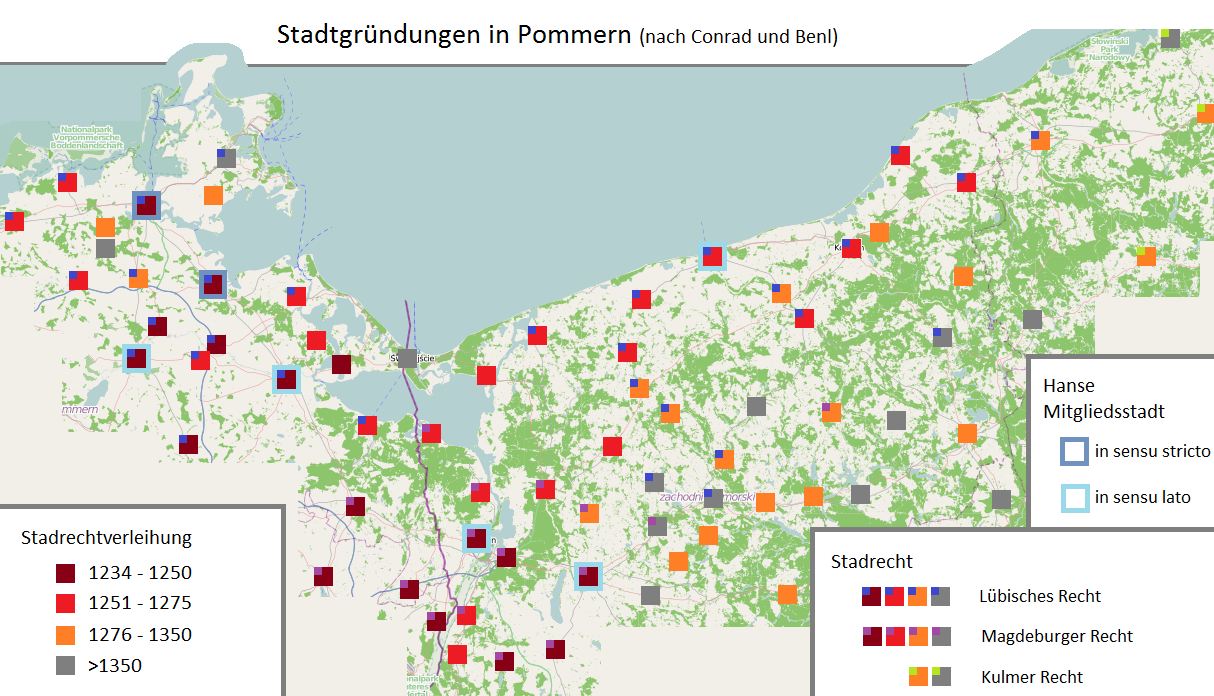
Granting of town rights in the area of the later Pomeranian province, superimposed on OSM. Most towns with Lübeck law appealed to Greifswald, most towns with Magdeburg law to Stettin.

Between 1234 and 1299, 34 towns were founded in the Pomeranian duchy, this number increased to 58 in the late Middle Ages. The towns were built on behalf of the Pomeranian dukes or ecclesiastic bodies like monasteries and orders. Most prominent on this issue was Barnim I of Pomerania-Stettin, who since was entitled "the towns' founder". The towns build on his behalf were granted Magdeburg Law and settled predominantly by people from the western Margraviate of Brandenburg, while the towns founded in the North (most on behalf of the Rugian princes and Wartislaw III of Pomerania-Demmin were granted Lübeck Law and were settled predominantly by people from Lower Saxony. The first towns were Stralsund (Principality of Rügen, 1234), Prenzlau (Uckermark, then Pomerania-Stettin, 1234), Bahn (Knights Templar, about 1234), and Stettin (1237/43), Gartz (Oder) (Pomerania-Stettin, 1240), and Loitz (by Detlev of Gadebusch, 1242). Other towns built in the 1240s were Demmin, Greifswald (by Eldena Abbey), Altentreptow.

According to Rădvan (2010), "a relevant example for how towns were founded (civitas libera) is Prenzlau today within German boundaries, close to Poland. It was here that, a short distance from an older Slavic settlement, duke Barnim I of Pomerania entrusted in 1234-35 the creation of a new settlement to eight contractors (referred to as fondatores) originating from Stendal, Saxony. The eight, who were probably relatives to some degree, were granted 300 Hufen (around 4800 ha) that were to be distributed to settlers, each one of the fondatores being entitled to 160 ha for himself and the right to build mills; one of them became the duke's representative. The settlers' land grant was tax exempt for three years, and it was to be kept in eternal and hereditary possession. A 1.5 km (1 mi) perimeter around the settlement was provided for unrestricted use by the community of pastures, forests, or fishing. Those trading were dispensed of paying taxes for land under ducal authority. Without being mentioned in the founding act, the old Slavic community persisted as nothing more that a suburb to the new town. Aside from several topical variations, many settlements in medieval Poland and other areas followed a similar pattern."

Many towns with a gard in close proximity had the duke level the castle when they grew in power. Stettin, where the castle was inside the town, had the duke level it already in 1249, other towns were to follow. The fortified new towns had succeeded the gards as strongholds for the country's defense. In many cases, the former Slavic settlement would become a suburb of the German town ("Wiek", "Wieck"). In Stettin, two "Wiek" suburbs were set up anew outside the walls, to which most Slavs from within the walls were resettled. Such Wiek settlements did initially not belong to the town, but to the duke, although they were likely to come into possession of the town in the course of the 14th century. Also in the 14th century, Slavic Wiek suburbs lost their Slavic character.

In western Pomerania, including Rugia, the process of Ostsiedlung differed from how it took place in other parts of Eastern Europe in that a high proportion of the settlers was composed of Scandinavians, especially Danes, and migrants from Scania. The highest Danish influence was on the Ostsiedlung of the then Danish Rugian principality. In the possessions of the Rugian Eldena Abbey, a Danish establishment, settlers who opened a tavern would respectively be treated according to Danish, German and Wendish law.

Wampen, Ladebow, and other villages near Greifswald are of Danish origin. Yet, many Scandinavian settlers in the Pomeranian towns were of German origin, moving from older German merchants' settlements in Sweden to the newly founded towns at the Southern Baltic shore.

== Territorial changes in the 13th century ==
=== War with Brandenburg ===
During the reign of Otto I, Margrave of Brandenburg and son of Albert I of Brandenburg (1100–1170), Brandenburg claimed sovereignty over Pomerania. Yet, in 1181, Holy Roman Emperor Frederick I invested Duke Bogislaw I of the Griffin House of Pomerania with the Duchy of Slavia (Pomerania). This was not accepted by the Margraviate of Brandenburg and triggered several military conflicts.

Between 1185 and 1227, Pomerania along with most of the southern Baltic coast remained under sovereignty of Denmark. However, Brandenburg again tried to gain sovereignty over Pomerania, and in 1214 for a short time conquered Szczecin. After Denmark lost the Battle of Bornhöved in 1227, Denmark lost all her territories on the southern Baltic shore, including Pomerania.

At this time, the Duchy of Pomerania was co-ruled by duke Wartislaw III of Demmin and duke Barnim I of Szczecin. After the Danes retreated, Brandenburg took her chance and invaded Pomerania-Demmin. In 1231, Holy Roman Emperor Frederick II gave the duchy, which then was again a part of the empire, as a fief to the Ascanian margraves of Brandenburg.

Denmark also attempted to restore her rule and took Wolgast and Demmin in 1235, but was driven out the same year. Wartislaw had to accept Brandenburg's overlordship in the 1236 Treaty of Kremmen, furthermore he had to hand over most of his duchy to Brandenburg immediately, that was the Burg Stargard Land and adjacted areas (all soon to become a part of Mecklenburg, forming the bulk of the later Mecklenburg-Strelitz area). Circipania was already lost to Mecklenburg in the years before.

In the 1250 Treaty of Landin between Pomeranian dukes and margraves of Brandenburg, Barnim I managed to reassert the rule of his Griffin house over Pomerania, but lost the Uckermark to Brandenburg.

Brandenburg since 1250 expanded eastward. In 1250/52, the margraves gained half of Lubusz Land, including the Kostrzyn Land between Warta and Mietzel (Myśla), and the terra Chinz north of the Mietzel river, both previously held by Barnim. In the course of the 1250s, the margraves further gained the Santok and Drezdenko castellanies except for the burghs itself, of both castellanies actually belonging to Greater Poland, Barnim had held the northern parts. In 1261, Barnim lost the Myślibórz area, and in the following years the Cedynia area to Brandenburg.

In 1264, Duke Wartislaw III of Demmin died, his cousin Barnim I (the Good) became the sole ruler of the duchy. In 1266, Barnim I married Mechthild, the daughter of Otto III, Margrave of Brandenburg.

In 1269, Barnim lost the Choszczno area to the margraves. Before his death, he bought the western part back in 1278.

Bogislaw IV lost the Pełczyce area and Zinnenburg Land (terra Arnhausen and terra Schivelbein), in 1280. All former Pomeranian territories east of the Oder lost to Brandenburg in the 13th century became parts of the Brandenburgian Neumark ("new march").

=== War with Silesia ===
In 1234 and 1241, Silesian dukes Henry I and Henry II expanded their realm to the North, and even took control of areas north of the Warta river previously held by the Dukes of Pomerania. The Griffin dukes, Silesian Piasts, Dukes of Greater Poland, the bishops of Lubusz and the bishops of Kamień all competed for the Warta/Noteć area, centered on the burgh of Santok. Until 1250, Barnim I, Duke of Pomerania had recovered most of the previous Pomeranian territory and sought to secure them with the settlement of Germans, while Zantoch burgh was held by Przemysł II of Greater Poland.

=== Competition for Sławno and Słupsk ===
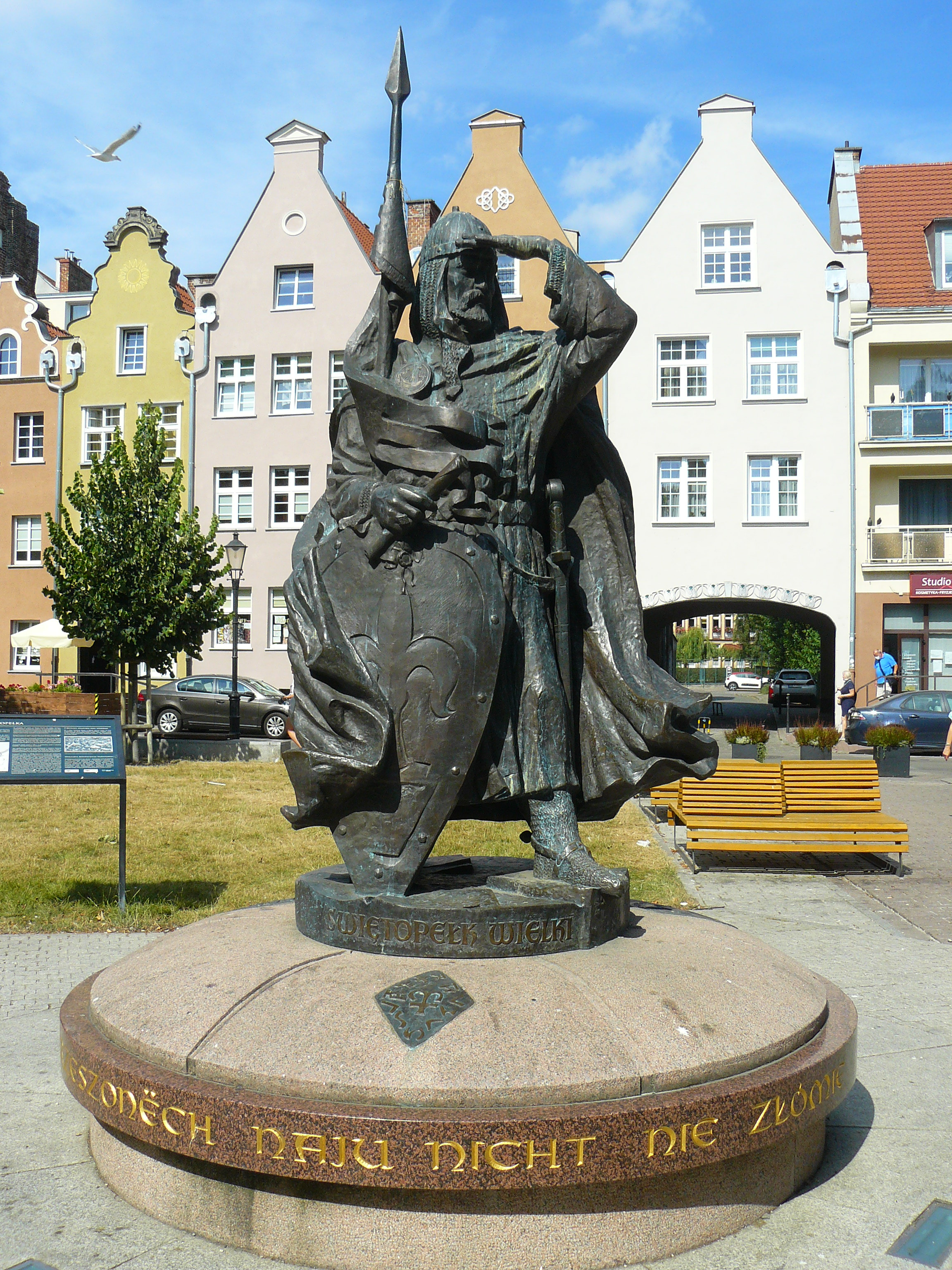
Monument of Duke Świętopełk II in Gdańsk

The last member of the Ratiborides branch of the Griffins, Ratibor II, died in 1223. This led to a competition between the Griffins and the Pomerelian Samborides for inheritance of Sławno and Słupsk. Because Ratibor died during the Danish period, Denmark administered the area until she had to withdraw after the lost Battle of Bornhöved in 1227. Barnim I, Duke of Pomerania, took control of the lands immediately after the Danish withdrawal, but had to yield Pomerelian duke Swietopelk's rights, whose relationship to the Ratiborides was closer. Swietopelk took over the Sławno and Słupsk area in 1235/36. The Griffins mounted an unsuccessful campaigns to gain the area in 1236/38, 1253, 1259, and 1266. After the death of Świętopełk II in 1266, Barnim I took over the area and kept it until 1269, when Rugian prince Vitslav II took over. He withdrew in 1277 and left the area to Brandenburg. In 1283, Mestwin II of Pomerelia took over. Competition arose anew after his death in 1294. In 1296, Vitslav's son Sambor launched another campaign.

When the area became incorporated into the Pomerelian duchy, the Swienca family gained control and gradually evolved to autonomously acting counts.

== Bibliography ==
- Buchholz, Werner, ed. (1999). Pommern (in German). Siedler. ISBN 3-88680-272-8.
- Buske, Norbert (1997). Pommern (in German). Schwerin: Helms. ISBN 3-931185-07-9.
- Addison, James Thayer (2003). Medieval Missionary: A Study of the Conversion of Northern Europe Ad 500 to 1300. Kessinger Publishing. ISBN 0-7661-7567-7.
- Heitz, Gerhard; Rischer, Henning (1995). Geschichte in Daten. Mecklenburg-Vorpommern (in German). Münster-Berlin: Koehler&Amelang. ISBN 3-7338-0195-4.
- Herrmann, Joachim (1985). Die Slawen in Deutschland (in German). Berlin: Akademie-Verlag. ISBN 3-515-07671-9.
- Inachin, Kyra (2008). Die Geschichte Pommerns (in German). Rostock: Hinstorff. ISBN 978-3-356-01044-2.
- Krause, Gerhard; Balz, Horst Robert (1997). Müller, Gerhard (ed.). Theologische Realenzyklopädie (in German). De Gruyter. ISBN 3-11-015435-8.
- Labuda, Gerard (1993). "Chrystianizacja Pomorza (X–XIII stulecie)". Studia Gdańskie (in Polish). Vol. IX. Gdańsk-Oliwa.
- Maclear, George Frederick (1969). Apostles of Mediaeval Europe. Ayer Publishing. ISBN 0-8369-2803-2.
- Medley, D. J. (2004). The church and the empire. Kessinger Publishing. ISBN 1-4191-5673-X.
- Palmer, William (2005). A Compendioius Ecclesiastical History from the Earliest Period to the Present Time. Kessinger Publishing. ISBN 1-4179-8323-X.
- Piskorski, Jan Maria (1997). "Die mittelalterliche Ostsiedlung - ein alter Streit und neue Ergebnisse". In Seibt; et al. (eds.). Transit Brügge-Novgorod. Eine Straße durch die europäische Geschichte. Essen. pp. 194–203.
- Piskorski, Jan Maria (1999). Pommern im Wandel der Zeiten (in German). Zamek Ksiazat Pomorskich. ISBN 83-906184-8-6. OCLC 43087092.
- Piskorski, Jan Maria (2007). "Slawen und Deutsche in Pommern im Mittelalter". In Herbers, Klaus; Jaspert, Nikolas (eds.). Grenzräume und Grenzüberschreitungen im Vergleich: der Osten und der Westen des mittelalterlichen Lateineuropa (in German). Akademie Verlag. ISBN 978-3-05-004155-1.
- Sommerfeld, Wilhelm von (2005). Geschichte der Germanisierung des Herzogtums Pommern oder Slavien bis zum Ablauf des 13. Jahrhunderts (in German). Adamant Media Corporation (unabridged facsimile of the edition published by Duncker & Humblot, Leipzig 1896). ISBN 1-4212-3832-2. (restricted online preview)
- Srokowski, Stanisław (1947). Pomorze Zachodnie. Studium geograficzne, gospodarcze i społeczne (in Polish). Instytut Bałtycki.
- Wernicke, Horst (2000). Greifswald:Geschichte der Stadt (in German). Helms. ISBN 3-931185-56-7.
- Zientara, Benedykt; Smolka, Stanisław; Loew, Peter Oliver (2002). Heinrich der bärtige und seine Zeit: Politik und Gesellschaft im mittelalterlichen Schlesien (in German). Oldenbourg Wissenschaftsverlag. ISBN 3-486-56615-6.
