= Principality of Gützkow =

Former monarchy in Europe

Principality of Gützkow Fürstentum Gützkow (German) Księstwo choćkowskie (Polish)
- until c. 1128
- Capital: Gützkow
- Religion: Slavic paganism
- Princeps
  - ?–c. 1128: Mitzlaw of Gützkow
- Historical era: Middle Ages
Preceded by	Succeeded by
Lutici	Duchy of Pomerania

Principality of Gützkow (Note: German: Fürstentum Gützkow; Polish: Księstwo choćkowskie) was an independent principality in Western Pomerania that existed in the Middle Ages until c. 1128. It was inhabited by the Lutici tribe and was centred around its capital, Gützkow. Around 1128, it was conquered by the Duchy of Pomerania and reorganised into Castellany of Gützkow. The sources written by Otto mention princeps Mitzlaw of Gützkow to be the ruler of the state around 1128.

== History ==
Until the 12th century, the burgh of Gützkow was a center of the principality inhabited by the Lutici tribe. By the time when Otto of Bamberg had converted the area into Christianity, the state was already conquered by the Duchy of Pomerania and reorganized into Castellany of Gützkow.

== Bibliography ==
- Theodor Pyl (1881). "Jaczo von Salzwedel". Allgemeine Deutsche Biographie (in German). Vol. 13. Leipzig: Duncker & Humblot. pp. 632–636.
- Theodor Pyl (1881). "Johann III. und IV.". Allgemeine Deutsche Biographie (in German). Vol. 14. Leipzig: Duncker & Humblot. pp. 218–221.
- Roderich Schmidt (1966). "Gützkow, Grafen von". Neue Deutsche Biographie (in German). Vol. 7. Berlin: Duncker & Humblot. pp. 290–291.
- Wächter, Joachim: Zur Geschichte der Besiedlung des mittleren Peeneraums. In: Beiträge zur Geschichte Vorpommerns: die Demminer Kolloquien 1985–1994. Thomas Helms Verlag, Schwerin 1997, ISBN 3-931185-11-7 (in German)
- Wächter, Joachim: Das Fürstentum Rügen - Ein Überblick. In: Beiträge zur Geschichte Vorpommerns: die Demminer Kolloquien 1985–1994. Thomas Helms Verlag, Schwerin 1997, ISBN 3-931185-11-7 (in German)
- Wöller, Werner: Vor- und Frühgeschichte, Mittelalter und frühe Neuzeit. In: Ortsgeschichtskommission Gützkow beim Rat der Stadt Gützkow (publ.): Heimatgeschichte von Gützkow und Umgebung. Heft 2/1990, pp. 4–23 (in German)
