= County of Gützkow =

Feudal Pomeranian county (1129–1359)

County of Gützkow Grafschaft Gützkow (German)
- County of Duchy of Pomerania
- Coat of arms
- Capital: Gützkow
- Government
- Count
  - 1129–? (last): Dobrosława of Pomerania
  - 1351–1359 (last): Johann III of Gützkow
- History
  - Dobrosława of Pomerania being titled the Countess of Gützkow: 1129
- Contained within
  - Country: Duchy of Pomerania
Preceded by	Succeeded by
Castellany of Gützkow	Vogtei Gützkow

The County of Gützkow (German: Grafschaft Gützkow) was a county located within the Duchy of Pomerania in the High Middle Ages. It was established in 1129 from the Castellany of Gützkow. Following the death of its last count in 1359, it was re-established into the Vogtei Gützkow.

== County of Gützkow (1219-1359) ==
Wartislaw was castellan of Gützkow until his death in 1219. His wife Dobroslawa, daughter of Bogislaw II, Duke of Pomerania, was styled Countess of Gützkow in a 1226 document approving the transfer of various lands to the nearby Stolpe Abbey. In 1234, Dobroslawa married the German noble Jaczo von Salzwedel, who expanded the old burgh on Gützkow's Schlossberg hill with stone buildings.

Around 1230, German settlers were invited to the sparsely settled central and northern areas devastated by earlier warfare. The German settlement was part of the pattern of larger migrations and social changes known as Ostsiedlung ("eastwards settlement"). Hanshagen was named after Count Johann I of Gützkow. Konrad II von Salzwedel, Jaczo's brother and since 1233 bishop of the Roman Catholic Diocese of Cammin (under the name Konrad III), advanced his relatives by enfeoffing them with lands belonging to Usedom Abbey (Grobe, Pudagla). Gützkow evolved into a town and was granted Lübeck law.

To oppose Eldena Abbey, which dominated the northern areas, Jaczo and Dobroslawa in 1242 founded a Franciscan friary (Grey Friars) in Greifswald, at this time the marketplace of Eldena. Hence this friary housed the tombs of the von Gützkow family. An inscription on the ceiling read:

"Anno MCCLXII [...] Fratres minores primo intraverunt hanc civitatem ad obtinendum. Vocati a Domino Jackecen comite generoso de Gutzkow, [...] quorum corpora hic in choro requiescunt. Nota: quod generosus Comis Jackecen de Gutzkow hanc aream dedit fratibus in honorem sanctorum Petri et Pauli [...]"

The Counts of Gützkow also minted their own coins.

Jaczo's sons Johann I, Konrad and Jaczo II were until 1270 called Herren von Gützkow (lords of Gützkow), thereafter Grafen von Gützkow (Counts of Gützkow). The marriage of Jaczo II and Cecislawa of Putbus was already arranged by the time they were aged five and two, respectively, Cecislawa being a princess of a branch of the family of the princes of Rügen who ruled the areas north of Gützkow. Other arrangements connected the Gützkow family with the House of Pomerania. In 1295, Jaczo II was a witness to the internal partition of the Duchy of Pomerania, which made Gützkow a part of Pomerania-Wolgast. Jaczo's grandson, Nikolaus of Gützkow, was in 1319 appointed by Wartislaw IV of Pomerania-Wolgast to lead a court.

Johann III and Johann IV were involved in a conflict with the Pomeranian dukes about their mother Margarete's possessions. Margarete's brother, Bogislaw IV, Duke of Pomerania, had handed over the areas of Konsages, Schlatkow and Bünzow as dowry. Probably when Wartislaw IV, Duke of Pomerania, claimed these areas, they joined Pomerania's opponent Mecklenburg in the first war for the Rugian succession. After the Battle of Griebenow, the Counts of Gützkow settled the conflict, changed sides and fought for the dukes of Pomerania. In 1327 they besieged the town of Barth. In April 1328, an army led by the Counts of Gützkow and assisted by troops from Demmin and Altentreptow won the decisive Battle of Völschow against the troops of Heinrich II of Mecklenburg (the Lion).

In 1329 - 1334, Counts Johann III and Johann IV assisted the dukes of Pomerania-Stettin in the Pomeranian-Brandenburgian War against the Margraviate of Brandenburg. In 1331 (1334), they participated in the Battle of Kremmer Damm. Due to the high war costs, they sold many areas to the town of Greifswald, e.g. in 1334 - 1351 Sanz, Müssow and Guest.

Count Johann V of Gützkow died on October 25, 1351, during the Battle of Schoppendamm near Loitz fighting in the Second War for the Rugian Succession. When his uncle Johann III died soon afterwards in 1359, the House of Gützkow became extinct in the male line. Until 1378, the sisters of Johann V continued to live in Burg Gützkow. The Counts of Gützkow were succeeded by the Dukes of Pomerania, who hence added "Count of Gützkow" to their title. The Gützkow coat of arms was incorporated into the arms of Pomerania. Subsequent to the dissolution of Pomerania as independent dukedom, the line Pommern-Stettin continued the use of the subsidiary title e.g. Erich v. Gützkow-Peglow.

== Vogtei Gützkow (1359-c.1600) ==
Gützkow represented in the 17th century coat of arms of the Duchy of Pomerania (bottom, center)

The name Grafschaft Gützkow (County of Gützkow) was further used to describe the area that the Pomeranian dukes had turned into a Vogtei. The last Vogt was Hans Owstin, who is mentioned in the 1480s. In the beginning of the 16th century, the Vogtei Gützkow was made part of Amt Wolgast, that comprised the area of the former Vogtei, the territory of Wusterhusen and the areas east of Gützkow. Even after the Vogtei was dissolved, the area was still referred to as Grafschaft Gützkow.

== Territory ==
The area of the principality, castellany, county and Vogtei of Gützkow did not change significantly over time. In the north, it was bordered by the rivers Ryck and Ziese. In the east, the border ran east of Züssow, Ranzin, Vitense and Owstin. In the west, the border ran west of Dersekow. In the south, the county was bordered by the Peene river, from time to time including the territories of Miserez and Ploth south of the Peene. At the end of the 12th century, the territory of Loitz was for some time part of Gützkow.

Stolpe Abbey received many gifts of land on both sides of the Peene River shortly after the principality was subdued by the Pomeranians. Jaromar I, Prince of Rügen, donated vast areas on both sides of the Ryck River to Eldena Abbey while he was appointed by the king Canute VI of Denmark to rule in the place of the infant sons of the subdued Bogislaw I, Duke of Pomerania, in 1189 - 1212. Thus, Gützkow's territory was sandwiched between that of Eldena in the north and that of Stolpe in the south.

The Counts of Gützkow gave parts of their county in fee to the knightly families of Behr, von Horn and von Heyden.

== Gützkow branch of the House of Salzwedel ==
1. Jaczo von Salzwedel (b. c.1180, d. c.1248), married Dobroslawa of Pomerania
  1. Johann I
  2. Konrad I (III), married N.N. von Werle, daughter of Nikolaus I von Werle
  3. Jaczo II (b. 1244, d. before 1297) married Cecislawa von Putbus (b. 1247, d. after 1295)
    1. Jaczo III married N.N. von Werle, daughter of Johann I von Werle
      1. Nikolaus
      2. Bernhard, mentioned 1317 in the Peace of Templin
    2. Johann II married Margarete von Pommern, daughter of Barnim I, Duke of Pomerania-Stettin
      1. Jaczo IV (d. 1319 in the Battle of Wöhrden)
      2. Johann III der Ältere (the Elder) (d. 1359)
      3. Johann IV der Jüngere (the Younger) (Henning) (d. 1334 after the Battle of Kremmer Damm), married Mechthild von Schwerin, daughter of Gunzelin V von Schwerin
        1. Johann V (d. 25.October 1351 in the Battle of Schoppendamm near Loitz
        2. Elisabeth (d. about 1378)
        3. Mechthild (d. about 1378)
2. Konrad II von Salzwedel (d. 1241), as Konrad III Bishop of Cammin (1233–1241)

== Sources and references ==
- Theodor Pyl (1881). "Jaczo von Salzwedel". Allgemeine Deutsche Biographie (in German). Vol. 13. Leipzig: Duncker & Humblot. pp. 632–636.
- Theodor Pyl (1881). "Johann III. und IV.". Allgemeine Deutsche Biographie (in German). Vol. 14. Leipzig: Duncker & Humblot. pp. 218–221.
- Roderich Schmidt (1966). "Gützkow, Grafen von". Neue Deutsche Biographie (in German). Vol. 7. Berlin: Duncker & Humblot. pp. 290–291.
- Wächter, Joachim: Zur Geschichte der Besiedlung des mittleren Peeneraums. In: Beiträge zur Geschichte Vorpommerns: die Demminer Kolloquien 1985–1994. Thomas Helms Verlag, Schwerin 1997, ISBN 3-931185-11-7 (in German)
- Wächter, Joachim: Das Fürstentum Rügen - Ein Überblick. In: Beiträge zur Geschichte Vorpommerns: die Demminer Kolloquien 1985–1994. Thomas Helms Verlag, Schwerin 1997, ISBN 3-931185-11-7 (in German)
- Wöller, Werner: Vor- und Frühgeschichte, Mittelalter und frühe Neuzeit. In: Ortsgeschichtskommission Gützkow beim Rat der Stadt Gützkow (publ.): Heimatgeschichte von Gützkow und Umgebung. Heft 2/1990, pp. 4–23 (in German)
