= Castellany of Gützkow =

11th-century administrative subdivision in Central Europe

- Castellany of Duchy of Pomerania
- c. 1128–1129
- Capital: Gützkow
- Government
  - Type: Castellany
- Castellan
  - c. 1128 – 1129: Wartislaw I
- History
  - Conquest of the Principality of Gützkow: c. 1128
  - Death of Wartislaw I: 1129
- Contained within
  - Country: Duchy of Pomerania
Preceded by	Succeeded by
Principality of Gützkow	County of Gützkow
- Today part of: Germany

The Castellany of Gützkow (German pronunciation: [ˈɡʏtskoː]; German: Grafschaft Gützkow; Polish: Kasztelania choćkowska) was a castellany in the Duchy of Pomerania in the High Middle Ages, centered on the burgh of Gützkow. It was established before 1128 from the Principality of Gützkow, following its conquest by Pomerania. In 1229, following the death of its castellan, Wartislaw I, it was reorganised into the County of Gützkow. Currently, its territory forms a part of Mecklenburg–West Pomerania in Germany.

== History ==
Until the 12th century, the area centred around the burgh of Gützkow was controlled by the Principality of Gützkow, inhabited by the Lutici tribe. Before 1128, by the time when missionary Otto of Bamberg converted the area into Christianity, the state was already conquered by the Duchy of Pomerania and reorganized into Castellany of Gützkow. Wartislaw I, the duke of Pomerania, served as its castellan. Following his death in 1129, the area was reorganised into the County of Gützkow, with Wartislaw's daughter, Dobrosława of Pomerania, being titled the Countess of Gützkow.
