= Erich Gülzow =

German historian (1888–1954)

Erich Gülzow (29 March 1888 – 16 August 1954) was a German local historian, philologist and publisher. He wrote books on the history of Vorpommern and Rügen island. Through his publications on Ernst Moritz Arndt he became known beyond the borders of Pomerania.

== Life ==
Gülzow was born in Loitz in 1888 as the son of the local teacher and chronicler Christian Gülzow (1856–1934) and his wife Marie. After attending the Gymnasium Stralsund he pursued German studies, Romance studies and theology at the universities of Freiburg, Grenoble and Greifswald. For his dissertation about Heinrich von dem Türlin, he was honoured with the title of doctor in 1913. After passing the examination for the higher-level teaching qualification in 1914, he moved to Barth. At the secondary school there he was active from 1919 as Studienrat.

During this time he turned his attention to the history of Vorpommern and began to publish numerous writings and essays as an author and editor. He initiated the series "Barther Heimatbücherei" and in 1922 edited the 800-page "Chronik der Stadt Barth" by the late Wilhelm Bülow and published it. From 1935 to 1939 he published the series "Grimmener Heimatbücherei". On his suggestion, the Historische Kommission für Pommern published the Pommersche Lebensbilder in three volumes.

In the 1930s he focused his historical research on Ernst Moritz Arndt, about whose estate he had built up a collection since the 1920s. He participated in a historical-critical complete edition of Arndt's work, which was supported by the German Research Foundation and the universities of Greifswald and Bonn. In 1941 he retired early in order to devote himself better to this task. After the project leader Paul Hermann Ruth, who died in the Second World War, was called up, Gülzow took over the overall management. He did valuable detailed work in researching Arndt's life and work, but also put himself at the service of National Socialism.

After the end of the war, numerous research materials on Ernst Moritz Arndt were lost or destroyed. In October 1948 Gülzow made an attempt to re-establish the Arndt society, but was ultimately unsuccessful.

Gülzow died in Barth at age 66.

== Publications ==
- Zur Stilkunde der Krone Heinrichs von dem Türlin.Hermann Haessel, Leipzig 1914
- Barth vor 125 Jahren. Barth 1920
- Ernst Moritz Arndt in Schweden. Greifswald 1920
- Vom Barther Schulwesen in früheren Tagen. Barth 1921
- Ernst Moritz Arndt und Stralsund. Stralsund 1922
- Menschen und Bilder aus Pommerns Vergangenheit. Stralsund 1928
- Loitzer. Waberg, Grimmen 1939
- Gottlieb Mohnike
