= Slavinia =

Historical region

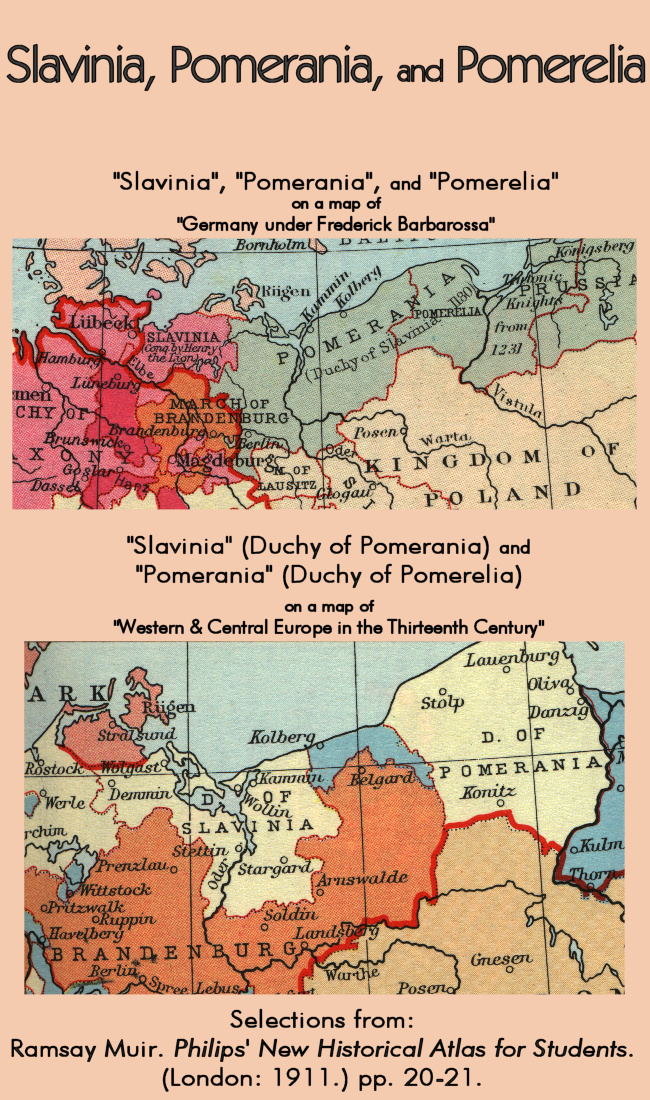
Slavinia, Pomerania, and Pomerelia in the 12th and 13th centuries

Slavinia (German: Slawien; Polish: Sławinia) is a historical region around the Oder River delta and the Szczecin Lagoon in Pomerania. It is part of present-day Germany and Poland, specifically Western Pomerania and Farther Pomerania, stretching from the Peene River in the west to the Parsęta in the east.

== History ==
From about 1156, the Griffin duke Bogusław I, elder son of the first Pomeranian sovereign Wartislaw I, ruled in Pomerania around Szczecin. He fought against the Saxon duke Henry the Lion in the 1164 Battle of Verchen, was defeated, and became Henry's liensman. When, in 1180, Henry was deposed by Emperor Frederick Barbarossa, Bogusław appeared at the emperor's camp near Lübeck and was enfeoffed with "Slavinia". The exact borders of the territory are unknown, as is its status as an Imperial estate. Four years later, Bogusław had to submit to King Canute VI of Denmark.

The term Duchy of Slavinia was sometimes used to denote the Griffin Duchy of Pomerania, located at the mouth of the Oder and ruled by the descendants of Duke Wartislaw I from the early 12th century on, from the Pomerelian lands in the east which were under the rule of the Samborides, initially as Polish vassals, and which were also called Duchy of Pomerania at the time. (Note: "...A distinction was made between Slavinia, or modern [i.e., 1911] Pomerania, and Pomerellen" (Chisholm 1911, pp. 47–48).)

The Griffin dukes remained under Danish overlordship until the 1227 Battle of Bornhöved. Under the rule of Bogusław's grandson Barnim I and his descendants during the Late Middle Ages, the Duchy of Pomerania was gradually Germanized culturally and linguistically, due to the immigration of German settlers in the course of the Ostsiedlung.

== See also ==
- Pomerania during the High Middle Ages
- Lands of Schlawe and Stolp
