= Bodo von Dewitz =

German art historian

Bodo Balthasar von Dewitz (11 April 1950 – 17 November 2017) was a German art historian. His work focused on historical photography.

== Life ==
Dewitz was born in Göttingen. After starting a commercial apprenticeship in the art trade, he studied German, history and education in Hamburg from 1971 to 1976. After the Staatsexamen, he studied art history in Berlin and Hamburg from 1977 to 1985, graduating with a doctorate (Dr. phil.) under Martin Warnke.

While still a student, he inventoried the daguerreotype collection at the Museum für Kunst und Gewerbe Hamburg. In 1985, he took over the management of the Agfa Foto-Historama in the Wallraf-Richartz-Museum/Museum Ludwig in Cologne. He later became head of the photographic collections and deputy director of the Museum Ludwig. Dewitz retired in spring 2013.

In 2004, the Faculty of Philosophy of the Rheinische Friedrich-Wilhelms-Universität Bonn, where he had been teaching since 1989, awarded him the title of Honorary Professor.

Dewitz died in Bonn at the age of 67. He was married and had two children.

== Activity ==
Dewitz conceived a number of outstanding and highly regarded exhibitions, his first already during his studies at the Städtisches Museum Braunschweig on war photography, which he then also made the subject of his dissertation. When the "Agfa Foto-Historama" was to be auctioned off in 2005, he succeeded in having the photo collection recognised as national cultural property and thus saved 11,000 photos for the Cologne museum. He was also able to save for the Museum Ludwig the collection of historical photographs by Robert Lebeck, photographs by Ursula Schulz-Dornburg, the Wolfgang Reisewitz's archive (fotoform), the Daniela Mrázkowá collection of photographs of the Russian avant-garde and most recently the Man Ray's-Leo Fritz Gruber's Archive.

== Exhibitions ==
- Das Agfa Foto-Historama im Wallraf-Richartz-Museum/Museum Ludwig der Stadt Köln, 1986
- An den süßen Ufern Asiens. Ägypten, Palästina, Osmanisches Reich – Reiseziele des 19. Jahrhunderts in frühen Photographien, 1988
- Hugo Erfurth – Photograph zwischen Tradition und Moderne, 1992
- Dom – Tempel – Skulptur. Architekturphotographien by Walter Hege, 1993
- Italien – Sehen und Sterben. Photographien der Zeit des Risorgimento (1845–1870), 1994
- Silber und Salz: Zur Frühzeit der Photographie im deutschen Sprachraum 1839–1860, 1989
- Alles Wahrheit! Alles Lüge! Photographie und Wirklichkeit im 19. Jahrhundert, (Sammlung Robert Lebeck), 1996
- Die Reise zum Nil: 1849–1850; Maxime Ducamp and Gustave Flaubert in Ägypten, Palästina und Syrien, 1997
- Schatzhäuser der Photographie. Die Sammlung des Fürsten zu Wied, 1998
- David Octavius Hill & Robert Adamson. Von den Anfängen der künstlerischen Photographie im 19. Jahrhundert, 2000
- Kiosk. Eine Geschichte der Fotoreportage, (Sammlung Robert Lebeck), 2001
- Ich sehe was, was du nicht siehst! Sehmaschinen und Bilderwelten, (Sammlung Werner Nekes), 2002
- Shooting Stalin – Die wunderbaren Jahre des Fotografen James Abbe, 2004
- Facts – Tatsachen. Fotografien des 19. und 20. Jahrhunderts, 2006
- Chargesheimer 1924–1971: Bohémien aus Köln, 2007
- Marinus – Heartfield: politische Fotomontagen der dreißiger Jahre, 2008
- Bilder machen Leute: Die Inszenierung des Menschen in der Fotografie, 2008
- La Bohème. Die Inszenierung des Künstlers in Fotografien des 19. und 20. Jahrhunderts, Landesmuseum Koblenz, 2010
- Politische Bilder. Sowjetische Fotografien, (Sammlung Mrázkowá), 2009
- Sternstunden des Glamour – Gesellschaftsbilder, Künstlerporträts und Modefotografien des 20. Jahrhunderts, 2011
- Art Spiegelman – Co-Mix. Eine Retrospektive von Comics, Zeichnungen und übrigem Gekritzel, 2012
- Man Ray – L. Fritz Gruber Archiv, 2013

== Publications ==
In addition to the catalogues for the exhibitions mentioned above, Dewitz published

- Daguerreotypien, Ambrotypien und Bilder anderer Verfahren aus der Frühzeit der Photographie. With Fritz Kempe. Series: Dokumente der Photographie Band 2, Museum für Kunst und Gewerbe Hamburg, 1983.
- Agfa Foto-Historama Köln. Westermann, Braunschweig 1988.
- So wird bei uns der Krieg geführt. Amateurfotografie im Ersten Weltkrieg. tuduv studie, Munich 1989.
- Hugo Erfurth: Menschenbild und Prominentenportrait 1902–1936. Wienand, Cologne 1989.
- Traffic. Hatje Cantz, Ostfildern-Ruit 2005.
- Schönheit, Macht, Vergänglichkeit: Fotografien aus der Sammlung Seiner königlichen Hoheit Prinz Ernst August von Hannover, Herzog zu Braunschweig und Lüneburg. Steidl edition, Göttingen 2009.
- Die Geschichte von Gostilitzy: Schloss und Gut des Carl von Siemens bei St. Petersburg. Werner Siemens-Stiftung, Thomas Helms Verlag, Schwerin 2009.
- "... die machen wieder in Familie!" Neugier auf Vergangenheit: Die Geschichte der Familie von Dewitz in Bildern. Edited with Michael and Werner von Dewitz, Thomas Helms Verlag, Schwerin 2013.
- Werner von Siemens. Sein Leben, sein Werk und seine Familie. Das Lebenswerk in Bildern. Thomas Helms Verlag Schwerin 2016, ISBN 978-3-944033-39-6.
- Carl von Siemens. Sein Leben, sein Werk und seine Familie. Das Lebenswerk in Bildern. Thomas Helms Verlag Schwerin 2016, ISBN 978-3-944033-40-2.
- Ich liebte helle Farben. Die Malerin Charlotte E. Pauly. Thomas Helms Verlag Schwerin 2018, ISBN 978-3-944033-16-7.

== Awards ==
In 2002, together with Robert Lebeck, he received the Annual Infinity Award of the International Center of Photography, New York, for the exhibition "Kiosk".

== Sources ==
- Bodo von Dewitz / Alexander Kraus / Andreas Renner: Kein Künstler, aber ein "verspielter Hund" Bodo von Dewitz über das Kuratieren als kreativen Prozess, in: zeitenblicke 10, Nr. 2, 22. Dezember 2011, URN: urn:nbn:de:0009-9-31879
- Helga Meister: Bodo von Dewitz: Ein Glücksfall für die Fotografie, in the Westdeutsche Zeitung, 30 January 2013
- Steffen Siegel: Vom Foto-Historama zur kritischen Fotogeschichte: Ein Nachruf auf Bodo von Dewitz (1950–2017), in Rundbrief Fotografie 24, No. 4, 2017, N.F. 96, p. 57.
- Herbert Molderings: Zum Tod von Bodo von Dewitz. In Fotogeschichte, issue 147 (2018). Online
