= Hendrik Born =

German admiral (1944–2021)

- Born: 5 July 1944; Loitz, Pomerania, Prussia, Germany
- Died: 2 August 2021 (aged 77) Bremen, Germany
- Allegiance: East Germany
- Branch: Volksmarine
- Service years: 1963-1990
- Rank: Vice admiral
- Commands: 1st Fleet, People's Navy (Volksmarine)

Hendrik Born (5 July 1944 – 2 August 2021) was a Vizeadmiral (vice admiral) of the East German Navy (Volksmarine) and the last chief of the People's Navy and its youngest Vizeadmiral.

== Childhood ==
Born's parents had eight children. His father worked for the railway after returning in 1950 from captivity as a prisoner of war in the Soviet Union. His family moved to Stralsund, where Hendrik Born attended school at the Hansa Gymnasium. His career goal was to be a teacher. After joining the Society for Sport and Technology (GST), he sailed on the type K-10 Cutter and participated in training courses at the People's Navy "Karl Liebknecht" university. This exposure helped him decide to become a professional sailor.

== Naval career ==
Born entered into military school and began training on 29 August 1963. He was appointed to the rank of Leutnant zur See (Ensign) upon graduation on 1 October 1967. During this time, Born joined the Socialist Unity Party of Germany (SED). He served from 1967 to 1970, as fire control officer on "Riga" type coastal vessels #124 and #122 in the 4th Fleet at Warnemünde, East Germany. This was followed by command from 1970 to 1972 of a Condor II class minesweeper #345. Born was promoted to the rank of Kapitänleutnant (lieutenant) on 7 October 1972. That same year, Born began studies at the Soviet Naval Academy in Leningrad.

In Leningrad, Born met Inessa Andreewna Komkova who later became his wife. He completed his studies at the Soviet Naval Academy in 1976 and graduated with distinction. On 1 October 1976, Born was promoted to the rank of Korvettenkapitän (lieutenant commander). Born was selected to take command of a "Koni" coastal frigate 142 in the 4th Fleet. While waiting for the delivery of this ship, Born and his crew trained on board its sister ship the "Rostock" and lived on a 4th Fleet accommodation ship until 1978. However, there was a significant delay in delivery of this ship from the Soviet Union. Most of Born's crew were short term specialists whose three years enlistment ended before the ship was delivered. Unfortunately another officer took command of it in 1979 when it was christened the "Berlin".

In 1978, Born was placed on the staff of the 4th Fleet as part of the staff operational work group. In preparation for the large Warsaw Pact maneuver "Brotherhood of Arms 80" („Waffenbrüderschaft 80“), he worked in a Rostock, East Germany office building called the Rostocker Ständehaus on the exercise's naval plans including its deception plan. On 7 October 1980, Born was promoted to the rank of Fregattenkapitän (commander), and in 1981 became the deputy director for operational work and later chief of staff of the 4th Protection Brigade.

In 1981, he moved to the 1st Flotilla at Peenemünde, where he served as the Deputy Commander and Deputy Chief of Staff. He assumed command of the 1st Fleet in 1984, a position he held until 1989. On 7 March 1985, he was promoted to Kapitän zur See (captain at sea) and again promoted on 7 October 1988 to Konteradmiral (rear admiral). He became the youngest admiral of the People's Navy. In August 1988, he led a naval visit to the Swedish Navy in Gothenburg, Sweden.

After Admiral Theodor Hoffmann became the East German Minister of National Defense, he selected Born as his replacement as the Chief of the People's Navy. Born was promoted to Vizeadmiral (vice admiral) on 11 December 1989. He held this position until his retirement on 2 October 1990. Born was the first Chief of the People's Navy, who was not the Deputy Minister of National Defense. After German Reunification Born served a few weeks as a civilian adviser to Bundesmarine Flottillenadmiral (flotilla admiral) Dirk Horten who had taken command of what was left of the People's Navy.

== Later life ==
After retirement Born was hired by Bremer Vulkan and later became MAN Turbo's sales manager in the Caspian Sea region and Turkey. When Volksmarine veterans Dieter Flohr and Peter Seemann wrote their history of the East German navy, Die Volksmarine, Born wrote a seven-paragraph commentary for the book's preface. Die Volksmarine was published in 2009.

Born died on 2 August 2021, aged 77.

== Military ranks ==
- Leutnant zur See - 1 October 1967
- Oberleutnant zur See - 1969
- Kapitänleutnant - 7 October 1972
- Korvettenkapitän - 1 October 1976
- Fregattenkapitän - 7 October 1980
- Kapitan zur See - 1 March 1985
- Konteradmiral - 7 October 1988
- Vizeadmiral - 11 December 1989

== Commands ==
- 1970-72 - "Condor II" class minesweeper #345
- 1976-78 - "Koni" coastal frigate #142 "Berlin"
- 1981-83 - Chief of Staff of the 4th Protection Brigade in Warnemünde
- 1983-84 - Chief of Staff of the 1st Flotilla in Peenemünde
- 1984-89 - Chief of the 1st Flotilla in Peenemünde
- December 1989 - 2 October 1990 - Chief of the People's Navy

== Medals and decorations ==
- Kampforden für Verdienste um Volk und Vaterland (VVO) in Bronze

Preceded by Theodor Hoffmann (admiral)	Chief of the Volksmarine - German Democratic Republic; 1989–1990	Succeeded by None
