= Dobrosława of Pomerania =

Pomeranian countess and princess

Countess of Gützkow and Schlawe
- Tenure: 1129–? (Gützkow)
- Born: before 1129
- Died: after 1226
- Spouse: Bolesław of Kuyavia
- House: Griffin
- Father: Bogusław I

Dobrosława of Pomerania (Note: Polish: Dobrosława pomorska; German: Dobroslawa von Pommern) (before 1129 – after 1226) was a princess from Griffin dynasty. She was Countess of Gützkow and Schlawe. She was most likely the daughter of Bogusław I, duke of Pomerania, and his wife, Walpurga.

== Biography ==
Dobrosława of Pomerania was most likely the daughter of Bogusław I, duke of Pomerania, and his wife, Walpurga, of the Griffin dynasty. In 1129, following the death of Wartislaw I, the castellan in the Castellany of Gützkow, she was titled the Countess of Gützkow, with the County of Gützkow being formed under her rule. She was also Countess of Schlawe.

Probably between 1187 and 1189, she had married Bolesław of Kuyavia, Duke of Kuyavia. In the marriage, she is thought to have had two or three children: Wierzchosława Bolesławówna, Audacja Małgorzata and a daughter whose name is unknown.

== Citations ==
=== Bibliography ===
- O. Balzer, Genealogia Piastów, wyd. II, Wydawnictwo Avalon, Kraków 2005, ISBN 83-918497-0-8.
- E. Rymar, Rodowód książąt pomorskich, Szczecin, Pomeranian Library, 2005, ISBN 83-87879-50-9, OCLC 69296056.
- J.W. Szymański, Książęcy ród Gryfitów, Goleniów–Kielce 2006, ISBN 83-7273-224-8.
