= Thomas Helms Verlag =

German publishing house

The Thomas Helms Verlag is a specialist publisher for North German culture, monument preservation, local and regional history, history, church and art history and is based in Schwerin in Mecklenburg-Western Pomerania.

== History ==
In 1994, the publishing house was founded by the Schwerin photographer Thomas Helms who by then had already created the illustrations for many books. Among others, he worked for the Henschelverlag, the Evangelische Verlagsanstalt, the Union Verlag Berlin, Koehler & Amelang, E. A. Seemann, the publishing houses Christiansen, Wachholtz Verlag, Edition Temmen, Verlag Schnell und Steiner and Droemer Knaur. His focus is on architectural photography, and he is particularly interested in the history and regional studies of Mecklenburg and Pomerania.

The publishing house is a member of the Börsenverein des Deutschen Buchhandels.

== Program ==
Since the founding of the publishing house, which was first called thomasius, more than 350 titles have been produced, many of them in several editions, with a focus on regional, cultural, architecture, church and art history of Mecklenburg and Western Pomerania. There are also a number of titles on northern German contemporary history. The programme features both scholarly titles and popular science publications. The series "Beiträge zur Architekturgeschichte und Denkmalpflege in Mecklenburg und Vorpommern", edited by Sabine Bock, now comprises thirteen weighty publications, some of which are multi-volume; the series "Beiträge zur pommerschen Landes-, Kirchen- und Kunstgeschichte", founded by Norbert Buske, already contains 18 titles and the series "Geschichte. Architecture. Art. Contributions to the Cultural Landscapes of Mecklenburg and Western Pomerania".

== Authors and editors ==
The authors and editors of the publishing house include Axel Attula, Sabine Bock, Michael Buddrus, Adrian Bueckling, Norbert Buske, Bodo von Dewitz, Otto Emersleben, Friederike Drinkuth, Dieter Greve, Hellmut Hannes, Ulrich Hermanns, Johannes Hinz, Max Reinhard Jaehn, Volker Janke, Bernd Kasten, Otto Kindt, Ingrid Lent, Günter Möbus, Ernst Münch, Christian Nieske, Frank Pergande, Haik Thomas Porada, Hans Reddemann, Fred Ruchhöft, Dirk Schleinert, Manfred Schukowski, Horst Wernicke, Rainer Wiedemann and many others.

== Awards ==
Two authors of the publishing house were awarded the Annalise-Wagner-Preis for their manuscripts that were published by the publishing house. In 2007, Sabine Bock received the prize for her work Herrschaftliche Wohnhäuser auf den Gütern und Domänen in Mecklenburg-Strelitz. Architektur und Geschichte (Beiträge zur Architekturgeschichte und Denkmalpflege. Vol. 7.1–3), ISBN 978-3-935749-05-3, and in 2016, Friederike Drinkuth was awarded for her historical-biographical sketch on Duchess Dorothea Sophie of Mecklenburg-Strelitz (1692-1765), was published under the title Männlicher als ihr Gemahl. Herzogin Dorothea Sophie von Mecklenburg-Strelitz] (ISBN 978-3-944033-00-6).
