= Norbert Buske =

German politician (1936–2023)

Member of the Landtag of Mecklenburg-Vorpommern
- In office 1990–1994

Personal details
- Born: 2 January 1936 Demmin, Germany
- Died: 20 October 2023 (aged 87)
- Party: CDU
- Occupation: Theologian

Norbert Buske (2 January 1936 – 20 October 2023) was a German theologian and politician. A member of the Christian Democratic Union, he served in the Landtag of Mecklenburg-Vorpommern from 1990 to 1994.

Buske died on 20 October 2023, at the age of 87.
