= Loitz =

Town in Mecklenburg-Vorpommern, Germany

- Town
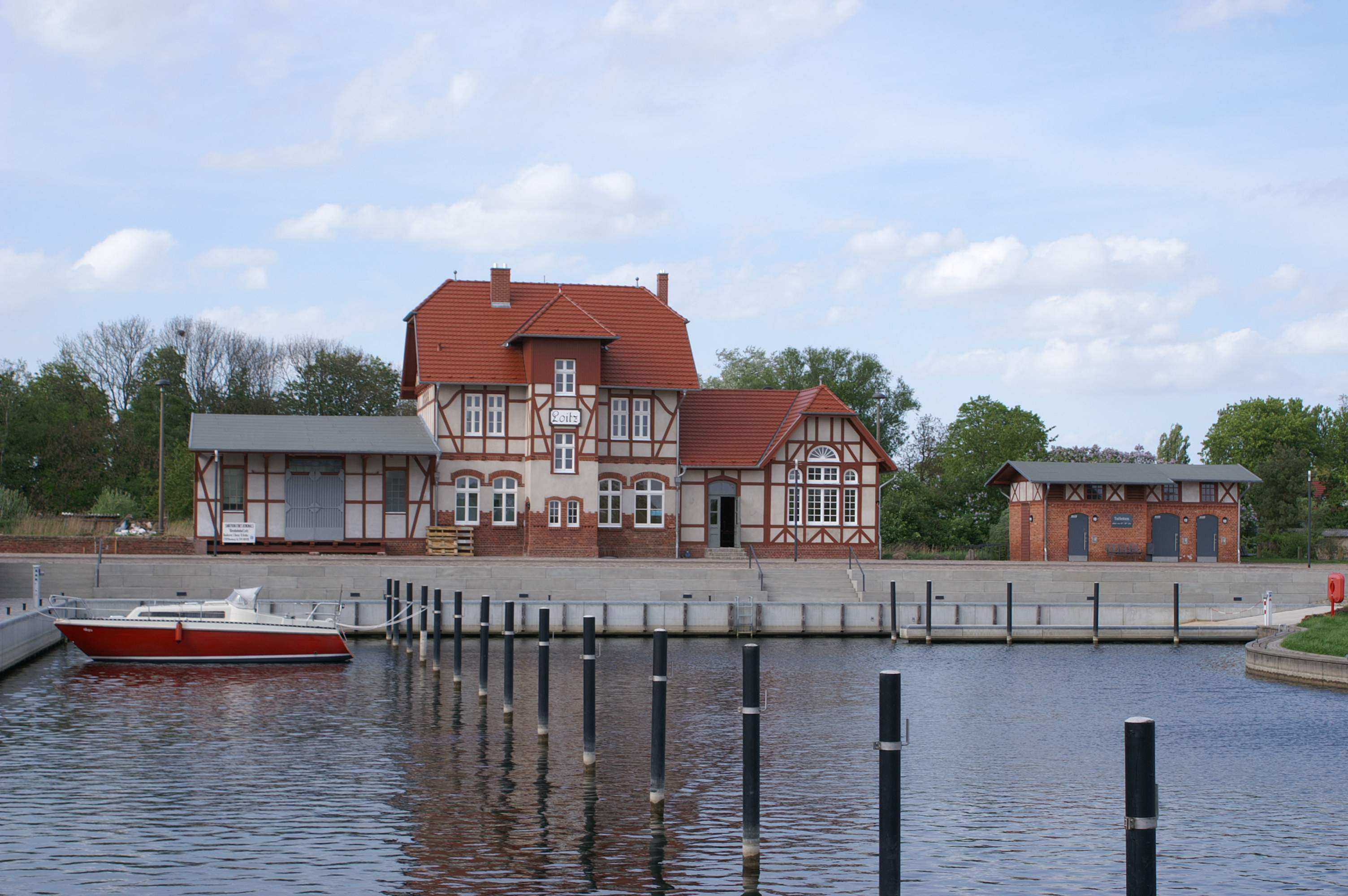
- Marina of Loitz

- Coat of arms

- Location of Loitz within Vorpommern-Greifswald district
- Interactive map of Loitz
- Location within Germany Location within Mecklenburg-Vorpommern
- Coordinates: 53°58′N 13°09′E
- Country: Germany
- State: Mecklenburg-Vorpommern
- District: Vorpommern-Greifswald
- Municipal assoc.: Peenetal/Loitz
- Subdivisions: 13

Government
  - Mayor: Christin Witt (CDU)

Area
  - Total: 89.91 km^{2} (34.71 sq mi)
- Elevation: 6 m (20 ft)

Population (2025-12-31)
  - Total: 4,157
  - Density: 46.24/km^{2} (119.7/sq mi)
- Time zone: UTC+01:00 (CET)
  - Summer (DST): UTC+02:00 (CEST)
- Postal codes: 17121
- Dialling codes: 039998
- Vehicle registration: DM, VG
- Website: www.loitz.de

Loitz (German pronunciation: [ˈløːts]) is a town in the Vorpommern-Greifswald district, in Mecklenburg-Western Pomerania, Germany. It is situated on the river Peene, 10 km northeast of Demmin, and 22 km southwest of Greifswald.

== Notable people ==
- Erich Gülzow (1888–1954), local historian, philologist and publisher
- Hendrik Born (1944–2021), vice admiral of the Volksmarine (East German Navy)
