= Gützkow =

Town in Mecklenburg-Vorpommern, Germany

- Town
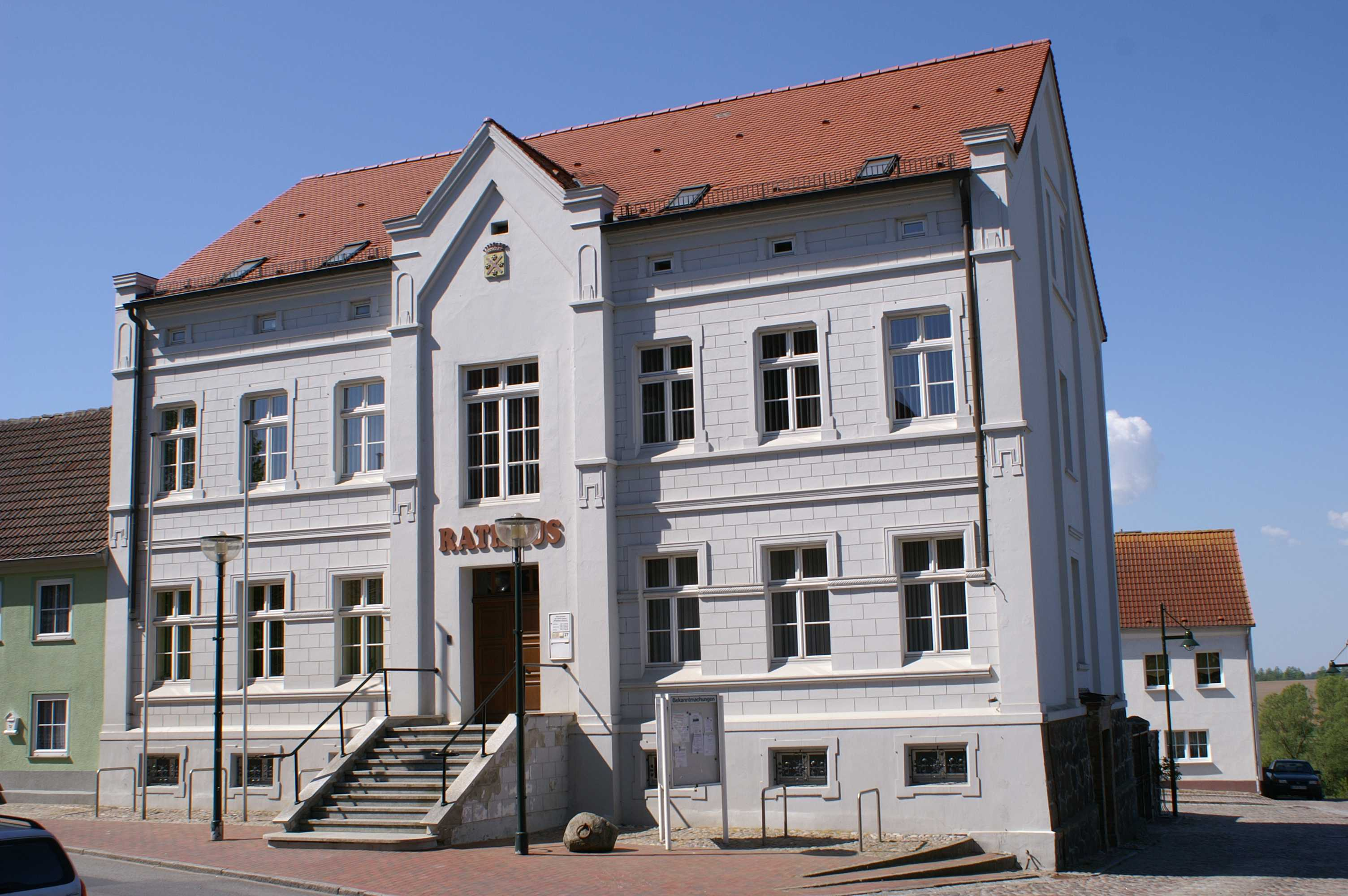
- Town hall of Gützkow

- Flag Coat of arms

- Location of Gützkow within Vorpommern-Greifswald district
- Interactive map of Gützkow
- Location within Germany Location within Mecklenburg-Vorpommern
- Coordinates: 53°57′N 13°25′E
- Country: Germany
- State: Mecklenburg-Vorpommern
- District: Vorpommern-Greifswald
- Municipal assoc.: Züssow

Government
  - Mayor: Jutta Dinse

Area
  - Total: 57.65 km^{2} (22.26 sq mi)
- Elevation: 12 m (39 ft)

Population (2025-12-31)
  - Total: 2,965
  - Density: 51.43/km^{2} (133.2/sq mi)
- Time zone: UTC+01:00 (CET)
  - Summer (DST): UTC+02:00 (CEST)
- Postal codes: 17506
- Dialling codes: 038353
- Vehicle registration: VG
- Website: guetzkow.de

Gützkow (German pronunciation: [ˈɡʏtskoː]) is a town in the District of Vorpommern-Greifswald in Mecklenburg-Vorpommern, in north-eastern Germany. It is situated some 15 kilometres (9.3 mi) south of Greifswald, on the north bank of the River Peene. Gützkow was the central town of the medieval County of Gützkow.

== Etymology ==
The name Gützkow is derived from the Slavic Old Polabian language, as is the case of most toponyms in Mecklenburg-Vorpommern. The oldest records of the name are 1128 as "Gozgauia", 1140 Chozcho, 1163 Gozkowe, 1175 Gotzchowe, 1183 Chozkowe, 1207 Gotzkowe, 1214 Chozcowe, 1228 Gutzkowe and are derived from Polabian Gost = German Gast (English "guest"), the town having had a temple, to which many guests traveled. The assumption of a person named Chockov (place of Chocek, Chocek as name-giver) is not based on facts.

Other historical earliest historical names include Gokecowe, Gotzekowe and Gotzkovborg.

== History ==
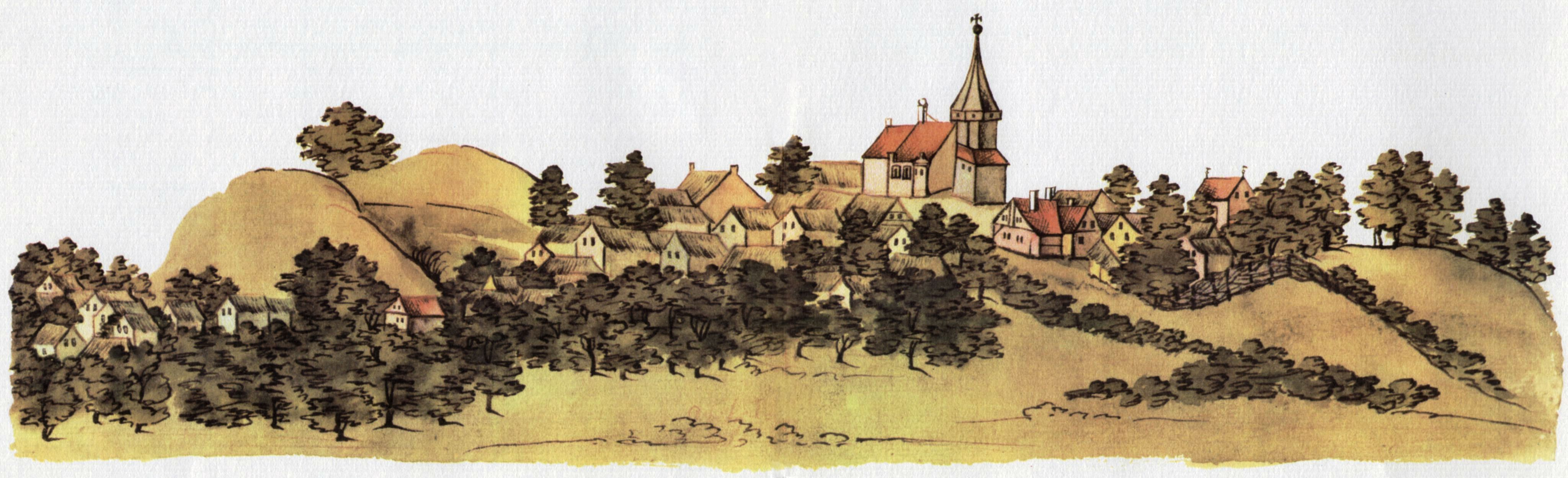
17th-century view of the town

In 1128, it became a part of the Duchy of Pomerania, a vassal duchy of Poland, then ruled by Bolesław III Wrymouth, who initiated Christianization, entrusting this task to Otto of Bamberg. A church was established in 1140. The town was raided by King Valdemar I of Denmark in 1163 and 1177. Around 1189 the town passed to the Principality of Rügen, a vassal of Denmark, and around 1216 it returned to the Duchy of Pomerania.

Following the Thirty Years' War it became part of Sweden, and in 1815 it passed to Kingdom of Prussia.
