= List of Pomeranian duchies and dukes =

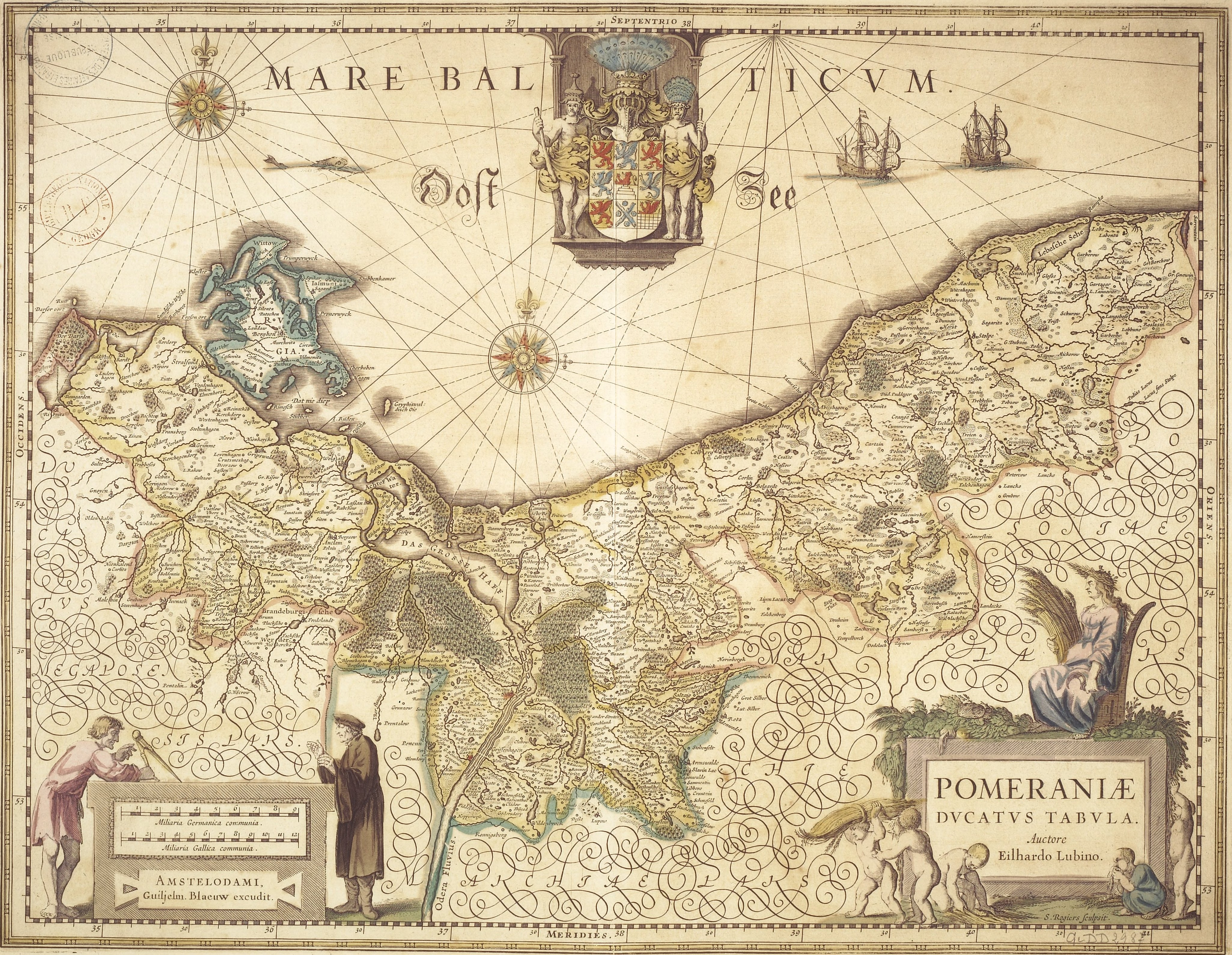
Map of the historical Duchy of Pomerania from the 17th century

This is a list of the duchies and dukes of Pomerania.

== Dukes of the Slavic Pomeranian tribes (All Pomerania) ==
The lands of Pomerania were firstly ruled by local tribes, who settled in Pomerania around the 10th and 11th centuries.

=== Non-dynastic ===
Ruler	Born	Reign	Death	Ruling part	Consort	Notes
Siemomysł	c.1000 or 1020	After 1000–1046	c.29 June 1046	All Pomerania	Unknown	First known duke of all Pomerania. His origins are unknown.
Świętobor	before 1046	1060–1106	1106	All Pomerania	Anna	Son of Siemomysl.
Świętopełk I	before 1106	1106–1113	1113	Gdańsk Pomerania (future Pomerelia)	Unknown	

In 1106, Pomerania is divided by his two older sons: Wartislaw, who founded the House of Pomerania and the Duchy of Pomerania, and Świętopełk I. After Swietopelk's death, his lands were occupied by the Saxon prince Lothar of Supplinburg. In 1155, the lands regained independence under Sobieslaw I, who founded the dynasty of the Samborides, and the Duchy of Pomerelia.

== Duchy of Pomerania ==
The Duchy resulted from the partition of Świętobor, Duke of Pomerania, in which his son Wartislaw inherited the lands that would become in fact known as Pomerania.

The Pomeranian Griffin

=== Partitions of Pomerania ===
==== First partition 1155–1264 ====
In 1155, Pomerania was divided in Pomerania-Szczecin and Pomerania-Demmin. In the struggle to shake off Polish and Danish claims to feudal overlordship, Pomerania approached the Holy Roman Empire. In 1181, while staying in the camp outside the walls of Lübeck, Emperor Frederick I Barbarossa recognised Bogislaw I as duke of S(c)lavia, as it was called in the document. However, three years later in the Battle in the Bay of Greifswald (1184) the Danish Canute VI forced Pomerania to accept him as liege lord. In 1190 the Land of Słupsk-Sławno separated itself from Szczecin. With the defeat of Denmark in the Battle of Bornhöved (1227) Pomerania shook off the Danish liege-lordship, except for the city of Szczecin which remained under Danish suzerainty until 1235.

In 1231 Emperor Frederick II granted the immediate liege lordship over Pomerania to the Margrave of Brandenburg, who enforced this claim by the Treaties of Kremmen (1236) and of Landin (1250). Thus Pomerania had become a fief of Brandenburg, thus an only mediate (indirect) subfief of the Empire, with Brandenburg itself being an immediate imperial fief.

In 1227, Słupsk came to Eastern Pomerania (Pomerelia) within fragmented Poland, Sławno to Western Pomerania. In 1238 both became part of Pomerelia, ruled by the House of Sobiesław, and following the extinction of the line in 1294, both were directly reintegrated with Poland in accordance with the Treaty of Kępno. In 1317, the area became part of the Pomerania-Wolgast (Wołogoszcz), first as a pawn from Brandenburg, and definitively in 1347.

After Wartislaw III died heirless in 1264, Barnim I became sole duke of the whole duchy. After Barnim's death, the duchy was to be ruled by his sons Barnim II, Otto I and Bogislaw IV. The first years, Bogislaw, being the eldest, ruled in place of his too young brothers.

==== Second partition 1295–1368 ====
In 1295, the Duchy of Pomerania was divided roughly by the Peene and Ina rivers, with the areas north of these rivers ruled by Bogislaw IV became Pomerania-Wolgast, whereas Otto I received Pomerania-Szczecin south of these rivers.

==== Third partition 1368–1376 ====
In 1368, Pomerania-Wolgast was divided into a western part (German: Wolgast diesseits der Swine, including the name-giving residence in Wolgast) and an eastern part (German: Wolgast jenseits der Swine, in literature also called Pomerania-Stolp or Duchy of Słupsk after the residence in Słupsk (Stolp)), which came back under Polish suzerainty as a fief.

==== Fourth partition 1376/1377–1478 and Pomeranian immediacy ====
In 1376, the western part of Pomerania-Wolgast (German: Wolgast diesseits der Swine) was subdivided in a smaller western part sometimes named Pomerania-Barth (Bardo) after the residence in Barth, and an eastern part which included the residence in Wolgast. In the following year, the Duchy of Słupsk was divided into a western part which included Stargard and an eastern part which included the residence in Słupsk (Stolp).

In 1459, the eastern partitions of Pomerania-Wolgast around Stargard and Stolp ceased to exist. In 1478, after 200 years of partition, the duchy was reunited for a short period when all her parts were inherited by Bogislaw X. By the Treaty of Pyritz in 1493 Pomerania shook off the Marcher liege lordship and became again an immediate imperial estate, after new disputes finally confirmed by the Treaty of Grimnitz in 1529, both treaties provided Brandenburg succession in case the Pomeranian dukes would become extinct in the male line.

==== Fifth and sixth partitions 1531–1625 ====
In 1531, Pomerania was partitioned into Pomerania-Stettin (Szczecin) and Pomerania-Wolgast. This time however, in contrast to the earlier partitions with the same names, Pomerania-Wolgast included the western, and Pomerania-Stettin the eastern parts of the duchy. In 1569, were created the duchies of -Barth (split off from -Wolgast) and -Rügenwalde (Darłowo) (split off from -Stettin).

==== Definitive reunification and annexation to Sweden ====
In 1625, Bogislaw XIV reunited all Pomerania under his rule. However, in 1637, Sweden hold western parts of Pomerania (Hither Pomerania), originally including Stettin, legalised by the Peace of Westphalia in 1648 (Swedish Pomerania, several times reduced in favour of Brandenburgian Pomerania). Between 1637 and 1657 Lauenburg-Bütow Land (Lębork and Bytów) were reintegrated directly to Poland as a reverted fief, thereafter passed to Brandenburg under Polish overlordship until the Partitions of Poland. In 1648, Brandenburg prevailed in the Peace of Westphalia with its claim only for eastern parts of Pomerania (Farther Pomerania), with the Brandenburg electors officially holding simultaneously the title of dukes of Pomerania until 1806 (end of the Empire and its enfeoffments), but de facto integrating their Pomerania into Brandenburg-Prussia, making it one of the provinces of Prussia in 1815, then including former Swedish Pomerania.

=== Dukes of Pomerania: the House of Griffins ===
==== Partitions of Pomerania under Griffins rule ====
Duchy of Pomerania (1st creation) (1121–1156)
Duchy of Demmin (1156–1264)	Duchy of Stettin (1st creation) (1156–1264)		Duchy of Schlawe-Stolp (1156–1238)
Duchy of Pomerania (2nd creation) (1264–1295)
			Duchy of Stettin (2nd creation) (1295–1464)
Duchy of Rugen (1368–1478)	Duchy of Wolgast (1st creation) (1295–1478)	Duchy of Stolp (1368–1459)	Duchy of Stettin (2nd creation) (1295–1464)
Duchy of Pomerania (3rd creation) (1478–1531)
Duchy of Wolgast (2nd creation) (1531–1625)		Duchy of Stettin (3rd creation) (1531–1625)
Duchy of Pomerania (4th creation) (1625–1637)

==== Table of rulers ====
(Note: Here the numbering of the dukes is the same for all duchies, as all were titled Dukes of Pomerania, despite the different parts of land or particular numbering of the rulers. The dukes are numbered by the year of their succession.)

Ruler	Born	Reign	Ruling part	Consort	Death	Notes
Warcislaus I	c.1091 First son of Świętobor, Duke of Pomerania (?)	1121 – 9 August 1135	Duchy of Pomerania	24 pagan wives Heila of Saxony before 1128 one child Ida of Denmark; 1129 three children	1135; Stolpe an der Peene aged 43–44	Possible children of Świętobor, Duke of Pomerania, divided their inheritance. Warcislaus was the first duke of Pomerania and founder of the family as a vassal of Poland. A pagan, he converted to Christianity in the beginning of the 12th century. Then, along with his son Bolesław, backed Otto of Bamberg in his successful Conversion of Pomerania. As for Racibor, he was the ancestor of the Ratiboriden branch of the House of Pomerania that ruled Słupsk-Sławno.
Racibor I	c.1095 Second son of Świętobor, Duke of Pomerania (?)	1121 – 1156	Duchy of Schlawe-Stolp	Pribislava Yaroslavna of Volhynia; 1136 four children	1156 aged 60–61	Possible children of Świętobor, Duke of Pomerania, divided their inheritance. Warcislaus was the first duke of Pomerania and founder of the family as a vassal of Poland. A pagan, he converted to Christianity in the beginning of the 12th century. Then, along with his son Bolesław, backed Otto of Bamberg in his successful Conversion of Pomerania. As for Racibor, he was the ancestor of the Ratiboriden branch of the House of Pomerania that ruled Słupsk-Sławno.
Regency of Racibor I, Duke of Schlawe-Stolp (1135-1156)						Children of Warcislaus, divided their inheritance, but given their minority, ceded rule to their uncle. In 1184 after the death of his nephew Warcislaus II, Boguslaus I reunited Stettin and Demmin.
Boguslaus I	1127; First son of Warcislaus I and Ida of Denmark	9 August 1135 – 18 March 1187	Duchy of Stettin	Walburga of Denmark three children Anastasia of Greater Poland; 26 April 1177 two children	18 March 1187; Sosnitza aged 59–60	Children of Warcislaus, divided their inheritance, but given their minority, ceded rule to their uncle. In 1184 after the death of his nephew Warcislaus II, Boguslaus I reunited Stettin and Demmin.
Casimir I	c.1130 Second son of Warcislaus I and Ida of Denmark	9 August 1135 – 1180	Duchy of Demmin	Pritolawa no children	1180 aged 49–50	Children of Warcislaus, divided their inheritance, but given their minority, ceded rule to their uncle. In 1184 after the death of his nephew Warcislaus II, Boguslaus I reunited Stettin and Demmin.
Swietopelk	c.1140 Son of Racibor I and Pribislava Yaroslavna of Volhynia	1156–c.1190	Duchy of Schlawe-Stolp	Unmarried	c.1190 aged 49–50	Left no descendants. His land passed to a cousin.
Warcislaus II	c.1160 Third son of Boguslaus I and Walburga of Denmark	1180–1184	Duchy of Demmin	Sophia of Poland no children	c.1184 aged 23–24	After his death Demmin returned briefly to Pomerania.
Regency of Anastasia of Greater Poland (1187-1208)						Children of Bogislaw I, they split once more the duchy between them.
Boguslaus II	1177; First son of Boguslaus I and Anastasia of Greater Poland	18 March 1187 – 23 January 1220	Duchy of Stettin	Miroslava of Pomerelia; 1210 three children	23 January 1220 aged 42–43	Children of Bogislaw I, they split once more the duchy between them.
Dobroslawa	c.1175? Daughter of Boguslaus I and Anastasia of Greater Poland	18 March 1187 – 1230	Duchy of Stettin (at Schlawe and Gützkow)	Wartislaw, castellan of Stettin c.1200 one child	c.1230 aged 44–45	Children of Bogislaw I, they split once more the duchy between them.
Casimir II	c.1180 First son of Boguslaus I and Anastasia of Greater Poland	18 March 1187 – 1219	Duchy of Demmin	Ingard of Denmark; 1210 two children	1219 aged 38–39	Children of Bogislaw I, they split once more the duchy between them.
Boguslaus III	c.1170? Son of Boguslaus of Schlawe-Stolp	c.1190–1223	Duchy of Schlawe-Stolp	A daughter of Mieszko III of Poland before 1223 two children	1223 aged 52–53	Nephew of Swietopelk.
Regency of Ingard of Denmark (1219-1226)						After his death in 1264, Barnim became the sole duke.
Warcislaus III	c.1210 Son of Casimir II and Ingard of Denmark	1219 – 17 May 1264	Duchy of Demmin	Sophia; 1236 three children	17 May 1264 aged 53–54	After his death in 1264, Barnim became the sole duke.
Racibor II	c.1190? Son of Boguslaus III	1223–1238	Duchy of Schlawe-Stolp	Unmarried	1238 aged 47–48?	After his death without descendants, the land returned to Pomerania.
Stolp annexed to Pomerania
Regency of Miroslava of Pomerelia (1220-1226)						Since 1227 the dukes were again vassals of the Holy Roman Empire. In 1264 Barnim reunited all Pomerania.
Barnim I the Good	c.1217 Son of Boguslaus II and Miroslava of Pomerelia	23 January 1220 – 17 May 1264	Duchy of Stettin	Anna Maria of Saxony c.1240 three children Margaret of Brunswick-Lüneburg; 1252/3 one child Matilda of Brandenburg c.1265 six children	13 December 1278; Dąbie aged 60–61	Since 1227 the dukes were again vassals of the Holy Roman Empire. In 1264 Barnim reunited all Pomerania.
Barnim I the Good	c.1217 Son of Boguslaus II and Miroslava of Pomerelia	17 May 1264 – 13 December 1278	Duchy of Pomerania	Anna Maria of Saxony c.1240 three children Margaret of Brunswick-Lüneburg; 1252/3 one child Matilda of Brandenburg c.1265 six children	13 December 1278; Dąbie aged 60–61	Since 1227 the dukes were again vassals of the Holy Roman Empire. In 1264 Barnim reunited all Pomerania.
Boguslaus IV	c.1255 Son of Barnim I and Margaret of Brunswick-Lüneburg	13 December 1278 – 24 February 1309	Duchy of Wolgast (in Pomerania until 1295)	Matilda of Brandenburg-Stendal between 1275 and 1278 no children Margaret of Rügen; 13 August 1284 six children	24 February 1309 aged 53–54	Ruled jointly. Bogislaw was the eldest son of Barnim I, and ruled with his stepmother, who was regent of her own sons. From 1294 Bogislaw ruled directly with his half-brothers Barnim and Otto, who reached majority in that year. Following the death of Barnim without descendants in 1295, Bogislaw and Otto divided Pomerania between them: Bogislaw retained Wolgast and Otto received Stettin.
Regency of Matilda of Brandenburg, co-ruling with Bogislaw IV (1278-1294)						Ruled jointly. Bogislaw was the eldest son of Barnim I, and ruled with his stepmother, who was regent of her own sons. From 1294 Bogislaw ruled directly with his half-brothers Barnim and Otto, who reached majority in that year. Following the death of Barnim without descendants in 1295, Bogislaw and Otto divided Pomerania between them: Bogislaw retained Wolgast and Otto received Stettin.
Barnim II	c.1277 First son of Barnim I and Matilda of Brandenburg	13 December 1278 – 28 May 1295	Duchy of Pomerania	Unmarried	28 May 1295 aged 17–18	Ruled jointly. Bogislaw was the eldest son of Barnim I, and ruled with his stepmother, who was regent of her own sons. From 1294 Bogislaw ruled directly with his half-brothers Barnim and Otto, who reached majority in that year. Following the death of Barnim without descendants in 1295, Bogislaw and Otto divided Pomerania between them: Bogislaw retained Wolgast and Otto received Stettin.
Otto I	1279; Second son of Barnim I and Matilda of Brandenburg	13 December 1278 – 31 December 1344	Duchy of Stettin (in Pomerania until 1295)	Elisabeth of Holstein; April 1296 two children	31 December 1344 aged 64–65	Ruled jointly. Bogislaw was the eldest son of Barnim I, and ruled with his stepmother, who was regent of her own sons. From 1294 Bogislaw ruled directly with his half-brothers Barnim and Otto, who reached majority in that year. Following the death of Barnim without descendants in 1295, Bogislaw and Otto divided Pomerania between them: Bogislaw retained Wolgast and Otto received Stettin.
Warcislaus IV	c.1270 Son of Boguslaus IV and Matilda of Brandenburg-Stendal	24 February 1309 – 1 August 1326	Duchy of Wolgast	Elisabeth of Lindow-Ruppin; 11 April 1316 or 1317 three children	1 August 1326 aged 55–56	In 1325 annexed the Principality of Rügen.
Matilda	c.1300 Daughter of Otto I and Elisabeth of Holstein	1317 – 12 July 1331	Duchy of Stettin (at Stavenhagen)	John III, Lord of Werle; 20 January 1317 three children	12 July 1331 aged 30–31	Daughter of Otto I, received from her father the town of Stavenhagen, which passed, through her marriage, to Werle.
Stavenhagen annexed to Werle
Regency of Elisabeth of Lindow-Ruppin (1326-1330)						Sons of Bogislaw IV, ruled jointly. In 1368, Boguslaus, the last surviving brother, divided the land with his brother Barnim's heirs: They kept Wolgast, and Boguslaus created Stolp for himself.
Boguslaus V the Great	c.1318 Slupsk; First son of Warcislaus IV and Elisabeth of Lindow-Ruppin	1 August 1326 – 23 April 1374	Duchy of Stolp (at Wolgast until 1368)	Elisabeth of Poland; 24 or 25 February 1343 three children Adelaide of Brunswick-Grubenhagen; 1362 or 1363 four children	23 April 1374; Belbuck aged 55–56	Sons of Bogislaw IV, ruled jointly. In 1368, Boguslaus, the last surviving brother, divided the land with his brother Barnim's heirs: They kept Wolgast, and Boguslaus created Stolp for himself.
Barnim IV the Good	1325; Second son of Warcislaus IV and Elisabeth of Lindow-Ruppin	1 August 1326 – 22 August 1365	Duchy of Wolgast (at Rügen and Wolgast itself)	Sophia of Mecklenburg-Werle; 1343 three children	22 August 1365 aged 39–40	Sons of Bogislaw IV, ruled jointly. In 1368, Boguslaus, the last surviving brother, divided the land with his brother Barnim's heirs: They kept Wolgast, and Boguslaus created Stolp for himself.
Warcislaus V the Father of the People	c.1 November 1326; Third son of Warcislaus IV and Elisabeth of Lindow-Ruppin	1 August 1326 – 1390	Duchy of Wolgast (at Szczecinek)	Anna of Mecklenburg-Stargard before 1390 no children	1390 aged 63–64	Sons of Bogislaw IV, ruled jointly. In 1368, Boguslaus, the last surviving brother, divided the land with his brother Barnim's heirs: They kept Wolgast, and Boguslaus created Stolp for himself.
Szczecinek rejoined Wolgast
Barnim III the Great	c.1300 Son of Otto I and Elisabeth of Holstein	31 December 1344 – 14 August 1368	Duchy of Stettin	Agnes of Brunswick-Grubenhagen; 1330 five children	14 August 1368 aged 67–68	Co-ruling since 1320.
Casimir III	1348; First son of Barnim III and Agnes of Brunswick-Grubenhagen	14 August 1368 – 24 August 1372	Duchy of Stettin	Unmarried	24 August 1372; Chojna aged 23–24	
Warcislaus VI the One-Eyed	1345; First son of Barnim IV and Sophia of Mecklenburg-Werle	22 August 1365 – 13 June 1394	Duchy of Rügen	Anne of Mecklenburg-Stargard; 1 October 1363 four children	13 June 1394; Klępino Białogardzkie aged 48–49	Sons of Barnim IV, ruled jointly. In 1377, they divided the land: Bogislaw kept Wolgast and Warcislaus retained Rügen. However, as Bogislaw died without heirs, Warcislaus reunited Rügen with Wolgast.
Warcislaus VI the One-Eyed	1345; First son of Barnim IV and Sophia of Mecklenburg-Werle	7 March 1393 – 13 June 1394	Duchy of Wolgast	Anne of Mecklenburg-Stargard; 1 October 1363 four children	13 June 1394; Klępino Białogardzkie aged 48–49	Sons of Barnim IV, ruled jointly. In 1377, they divided the land: Bogislaw kept Wolgast and Warcislaus retained Rügen. However, as Bogislaw died without heirs, Warcislaus reunited Rügen with Wolgast.
Boguslaus VI	1354; Second son of Barnim IV and Sophia of Mecklenburg-Werle	22 August 1365 – 7 March 1393	Duchy of Wolgast	Judith of Saxe-Lauenburg between 1369 and 1377 no children Agnes of Brunswick-Lüneburg; 14 or 19 September 1389; Celle two children	7 March 1393 aged 38–39	Sons of Barnim IV, ruled jointly. In 1377, they divided the land: Bogislaw kept Wolgast and Warcislaus retained Rügen. However, as Bogislaw died without heirs, Warcislaus reunited Rügen with Wolgast.
Swantibor I	1351; Second son of Barnim III and Agnes of Brunswick-Grubenhagen	24 August 1372 – 21 June 1413	Duchy of Stettin	Anne of Nuremberg; 17 September 1363 four children	21 June 1413 aged 61–62	Brothers of Casimir III, ruled jointly.
Boguslaus VII the Elder	c.1355 Third son of Barnim III and Agnes of Brunswick-Grubenhagen	24 August 1372 – 1404	Duchy of Stettin	Unknown before 1404 no children	1404 aged 48–49	Brothers of Casimir III, ruled jointly.
Casimir IV	1351; First son of Boguslaus V and Elisabeth of Poland	23 April 1374 – 2 January 1377	Duchy of Stolp	Kenna of Lithuania; 1360 no children Margaret of Masovia; 1368 or 1369 no children	2 January 1377 aged 25–26	After his death his sons divided the land.
Margaret of Masovia	c.1355 Daughter of Siemowit III, Duke of Masovia and Euphemia of Opava	2 January 1377 – 1379	Duchy of Stolp (at Bydgoszcz, Dobryzn, Gniewkowo, Inowroclaw and Wyszogrod)	Casimir IV; 1368 or 1369 no children Henry VII, Duke of Brzeg; 1379 two children	1409 aged 53–54	Widow and brothers of Casimir IV. Margaret received some towns from her husband as seats, which she may have been dispossessed after marrying again in 1379; as for the rest of the inheritance: Warcislaus received Stolp, and Boguslaus and Barnim received Stargard together. The death of Warcislaus made possible, for Boguslaus and Barnim, the reunion of the inheritance of their father. However, there was an heir to Stolp: Boguslaus, who would be brought up in Denmark and changed name to Eric.
Warcislaus VII	1363; Second son of Boguslaus V and Elisabeth of Poland	2 January 1377 – 1395	Duchy of Stolp	Maria of Mecklenburg-Schwerin; 23 March 1380 one child	1395 aged 31–32	Widow and brothers of Casimir IV. Margaret received some towns from her husband as seats, which she may have been dispossessed after marrying again in 1379; as for the rest of the inheritance: Warcislaus received Stolp, and Boguslaus and Barnim received Stargard together. The death of Warcislaus made possible, for Boguslaus and Barnim, the reunion of the inheritance of their father. However, there was an heir to Stolp: Boguslaus, who would be brought up in Denmark and changed name to Eric.
Boguslaus VIII Magnus	c.1364 First son of Boguslaus V and Adelaide of Brunswick-Grubenhagen	2 January 1377 – 11 February 1418	Duchy of Stolp (at Stargard until 1395)	Sophia of Holstein c.1398 two children	11 February 1418 aged 53–54	Widow and brothers of Casimir IV. Margaret received some towns from her husband as seats, which she may have been dispossessed after marrying again in 1379; as for the rest of the inheritance: Warcislaus received Stolp, and Boguslaus and Barnim received Stargard together. The death of Warcislaus made possible, for Boguslaus and Barnim, the reunion of the inheritance of their father. However, there was an heir to Stolp: Boguslaus, who would be brought up in Denmark and changed name to Eric.
Barnim V	1369; Second son of Boguslaus V and Adelaide of Brunswick-Grubenhagen	2 January 1377 – 1403	Duchy of Stolp (at Stargard until 1395)	Hedwig of Lithuania; 27 September 1396 one child	1403 aged 33–34	Widow and brothers of Casimir IV. Margaret received some towns from her husband as seats, which she may have been dispossessed after marrying again in 1379; as for the rest of the inheritance: Warcislaus received Stolp, and Boguslaus and Barnim received Stargard together. The death of Warcislaus made possible, for Boguslaus and Barnim, the reunion of the inheritance of their father. However, there was an heir to Stolp: Boguslaus, who would be brought up in Denmark and changed name to Eric.
Bydgoszcz, Dobryzn, Gniewkowo, Inowroclaw and Wyszogrod were annexed to the Duchy of Opole
Barnim VI	c.1365 First son of Warcislaus VI and Anne of Mecklenburg-Stargard	13 June 1394 – 22 September 1405	Duchy of Wolgast	Veronica of Nuremberg circa or before 1395 three children	22 September 1405; Pütnitz aged 39–40	Children of Warcislaus VI, divided their inheritance.
Warcislaus VIII	1373; Second son of Warcislaus VI and Anne of Mecklenburg-Stargard	13 June 1394 – 23 August 1415	Duchy of Rügen	Agnes of Saxe-Lauenburg circa or before 1398 four children	23 August 1415 aged 41–42	Children of Warcislaus VI, divided their inheritance.
Regency of Warcislaus VIII, Duke of Pomerania-Rügen (1405-1415)						Sons of Barnim VI, divided their inheritance, but after Barnim VII's death without descendants, Warcislaus IX reunited it.
Barnim VII the Elder	1390; First son of Barnim VI and Veronica of Nuremberg	22 September 1405 – 22 September 1450	Duchy of Wolgast (at Demmin)	Unmarried	22 September 1450; Gützkow or Wolgast aged 59–60	Sons of Barnim VI, divided their inheritance, but after Barnim VII's death without descendants, Warcislaus IX reunited it.
Warcislaus IX	c.1400 Second son of Barnim VI and Veronica of Nuremberg	22 September 1405 – 17 April 1457	Duchy of Wolgast	Sophia of Saxe-Lauenburg; 1420 four children	17 April 1457; Wolgast aged 56–57	Sons of Barnim VI, divided their inheritance, but after Barnim VII's death without descendants, Warcislaus IX reunited it.
Demmin rejoined Wolgast
Otto II	c.1380 First son of Swantibor I and Anne of Nuremberg	21 June 1413 – 27 March 1428	Duchy of Stettin	Agnes of Mecklenburg-Stargard c.1411 no children	27 March 1428 aged 47–48	Sons of Swantibor I, ruled jointly. Casimir participated in the famous Battle of Grunwald (1410).
Casimir V	c.1380 Second son of Swantibor I and Anne of Nuremberg	21 June 1413 – 13 April 1435	Duchy of Stettin	Catherine of Brunswick-Lüneburg circa or before 1420 three children Elisabeth of Brunswick-Grubenhagen circa or before 1439 one child	13 April 1435 aged 54–55?	Sons of Swantibor I, ruled jointly. Casimir participated in the famous Battle of Grunwald (1410).
Regency of Agnes of Saxe-Lauenburg (1415-1425)						Children of Warcislaus VIII. Swantibor and Barnim ruled jointly. As they had no descendants, their possessions returned to the sons of Barnim VI. Sophie was given separate lands, inherited later by Werle.
Barnim VIII the Younger	c.1405 First son of Warcislaus VIII and Agnes of Saxe-Lauenburg	23 August 1415 – 19 December 1451	Duchy of Rügen	Anna of Wunstorf c.1435 one child	19 December 1451 aged 45–46	Children of Warcislaus VIII. Swantibor and Barnim ruled jointly. As they had no descendants, their possessions returned to the sons of Barnim VI. Sophie was given separate lands, inherited later by Werle.
Swantibor II the Calm	c.1408 Second son of Warcislaus VIII and Agnes of Saxe-Lauenburg	23 August 1415 – 1435	Duchy of Rügen	Unmarried	c.1435 aged 26–27	Children of Warcislaus VIII. Swantibor and Barnim ruled jointly. As they had no descendants, their possessions returned to the sons of Barnim VI. Sophie was given separate lands, inherited later by Werle.
Sophia	c.1405? Daughter of Warcislaus VIII and Agnes of Saxe-Lauenburg	23 August 1415 – 1453	Duchy of Rügen (at Barth, Zingst and Damgarten)	William, Lord of Werle after 1426 one child	1453 aged 47–48?	Children of Warcislaus VIII. Swantibor and Barnim ruled jointly. As they had no descendants, their possessions returned to the sons of Barnim VI. Sophie was given separate lands, inherited later by Werle.
Rügen briefly joined Wolgast; Barth, Zingst and Damgarten annexed to Werle
Regency of Sophia of Holstein (1418-1425)						
Boguslaus IX	1407; Son of Boguslaus VIII and Sophia of Holstein	11 February 1418 – 7 December 1446	Duchy of Stolp	Maria of Masovia; 24 June 1432; Poznań two children	7 December 1446 aged 38–39	
Regency of Frederick II, Elector of Brandenburg (1435-1440)						Son of Casimir V.
Joachim the Younger	1424; Son of Casimir V and Catherine of Brunswick-Lüneburg	13 April 1435 – 4 October 1451	Duchy of Stettin	Elisabeth of Brandenburg; 29 September 1440 one child	4 October 1451	Son of Casimir V.
Regency of Maria of Masovia (1446-1449)						Son of Warcislaus VII and original heir of Stolp in 1394, was under regency of his cousin's widow, Maria. His absence was probably the cause of his being bypassed in the Pomeranian succession. Also King of the Union of Kalmar between Denmark, Sweden and Norway.
Eric I	1381; Darłowo; Son of Warcislaus VII and Maria of Mecklenburg-Schwerin	1449 – 3 May 1459	Duchy of Stolp	Philippa of England; 26 October 1406; Lund one child	3 May 1459; Darłowo aged 77–78	Son of Warcislaus VII and original heir of Stolp in 1394, was under regency of his cousin's widow, Maria. His absence was probably the cause of his being bypassed in the Pomeranian succession. Also King of the Union of Kalmar between Denmark, Sweden and Norway.
Regency of Frederick II, Elector of Brandenburg (1451-1458)						After his death without descendants, Stettin was annexed to Wolgast.
Otto III	29 May 1444; Son of Joachim and Elisabeth of Brandenburg	4 October 1451 – 7 September 1464	Duchy of Stettin	Unmarried	7 September 1464 aged 20	After his death without descendants, Stettin was annexed to Wolgast.
Stettin annexed to Wolgast
Sophie	1435; Daughter of Boguslaus IX and Maria of Masovia	3 May 1459 – 1474	Duchy of Stolp	1451 twelve children	24 August 1497; Slupsk aged 61–62	Heir of Eric I. Despite her husband had inherited the duchy itself, the fact that she only renounced her rights to Pomerania in 1474 is possibly a sign of a co-rulership between the spouses.
Eric II	1427; First son of Warcislaus IX and Sophia of Saxe-Lauenburg	17 April 1457 – 5 July 1474	Duchy of Wolgast	1451 twelve children	5 July 1474; Wolgast aged 46–47	Children of Warcislaus IX, divided their inheritance. In 1464 Eric absorbed Stettin, but it was only with Warcislaus' death that Pomerania was reunited, already under Eric's son, Boguslaus.
Warcislaus X	1435; Second son of Warcislaus IX and Sophia of Saxe-Lauenburg	17 April 1457 – 17 December 1478	Duchy of Rügen	Elisabeth of Brandenburg; 5 March 1454 two children Magdalena of Mecklenburg-Stargard; 1472 no children	17 December 1478; Franzburg aged 42–43	Children of Warcislaus IX, divided their inheritance. In 1464 Eric absorbed Stettin, but it was only with Warcislaus' death that Pomerania was reunited, already under Eric's son, Boguslaus.
Rügen annexed to Wolgast
Boguslaus X the Great	3 June 1454; Darłowo; Son of Eric II, Duke of Pomerania-Wolgast and Sophie, Duchess of Pomerania-Stolp	5 July 1474 – 17 December 1478	Duchy of Wolgast	Margaret of Brandenburg; 20 September 1477; Prenzlau no children Anna Jagiellon of Poland; 2 February 1491; Szczecin eight children	5 October 1523; Szczecin aged 69	Reunited Pomerania in 1478.
Boguslaus X the Great	3 June 1454; Darłowo; Son of Eric II, Duke of Pomerania-Wolgast and Sophie, Duchess of Pomerania-Stolp	17 December 1478 – 5 October 1523	Duchy of Pomerania	Margaret of Brandenburg; 20 September 1477; Prenzlau no children Anna Jagiellon of Poland; 2 February 1491; Szczecin eight children	5 October 1523; Szczecin aged 69	Reunited Pomerania in 1478.
George I	11 April 1493; First son of Boguslaus X and Anna of Poland	5 October 1523 – 10 May 1531	Duchy of Pomerania	Amalie of the Palatinate; 22 May 1513; Szczecin three children Margaret of Brandenburg; 23 January 1530; Berlin one child	10 May 1531; Szczecin aged 38	Sons of Bogislaw X, ruled jointly. After George's death, Barnim divided Pomerania with his nephew Philip. After his abdication in 1569, his possessions went to Pomerania-Wolgast.
Barnim IX the Pious	2 December 1501; Second son of Boguslaus X and Anna of Poland	5 October 1523 – 1569	Duchy of Stettin (in co-rulership in Pomerania until 1531)	Anna of Brunswick-Lüneburg; 2 February 1525; Szczecin seven children	2 November 1573; Szczecin aged 71	Sons of Bogislaw X, ruled jointly. After George's death, Barnim divided Pomerania with his nephew Philip. After his abdication in 1569, his possessions went to Pomerania-Wolgast.
Margaret of Brandenburg	1511; Daughter of Joachim I Nestor, Elector of Brandenburg and Elizabeth of Denmark	10 May 1531 – 15 February 1534	Duchy of Pomerania (at Barth, Damgarten, Tribsees, Grimsby and Klempenow)	George I 23 January 1530; Berlin one child John V, Prince of Anhalt-Zerbst; 15 February 1534; Dessau six children	November 1577 aged 65–66	Heirs of George I. Margaret received her jointure in some towns in Pomerania, which were returned to the main duchy after her second marriage; Philip divided the main duchy with his uncle, Barnim IX.
Philip I the Pious	14 July 1515; Szczecin; Son of George I and Amalie of the Palatinate	10 May 1531 – 14 February 1560	Duchy of Wolgast	Maria of Saxony; 27 February 1536; Torgau ten children	14 February 1560; Wolgast aged 44	Heirs of George I. Margaret received her jointure in some towns in Pomerania, which were returned to the main duchy after her second marriage; Philip divided the main duchy with his uncle, Barnim IX.
Barth, Damgarten, Tribsees, Grimsby and Klempenow joined Wolgast
Ernest Louis the Fair	20 November 1545; Second son of Philip I and Maria of Saxony	14 February 1560 – 17 June 1592	Duchy of Wolgast	Sophie Hedwig of Brunswick-Wolfenbüttel; 20 October 1577; Wolgast three children	17 June 1592	Sons of Philip I, ruled jointly. Divided the land in 1569: Ernest Louis kept Wolgast, John Frederick received Stettin, Bogislaw received Barth and Neuenkamp (later Franzburg), and Barnim received Darłowo. In 1592 Bogislaw became tutor of his nephew Philip Julius. In 1600 after the death of John Frederick without children, the land was inherited by Barnim, who reunited it with Darłowo. At the latter's death in 1603 also with no descendants, Boguslaus received Stettin and united it with Barth. but he gave Rügenwalde to one of his sons, and gave Barth and Neuenkamp to Philip Julius.
John Frederick the Strong	27 August 1542; Wolgast; First son of Philip I and Maria of Saxony	1569 – 9 February 1600	Duchy of Stettin (in co-rulership in Wolgast 1560-69)	Erdmuthe of Brandenburg; 17 February 1577; Szczecin no children	9 February 1600; Wolgast aged 57	
Barnim X the Younger	15 February 1549; Wolgast; Fourth son of Philip I and Maria of Saxony	1569 – 1 September 1603	Duchy of Stettin (in co-rulership in Wolgast 1560-69; in Darłowo until 1600)	Anna Maria of Brandenburg; 8 January 1581; Berlin no children	1 September 1603; Szczecin aged 54	
Boguslaus XIII [XI]	9 August 1544; Wolgast; Third son of Philip I and Maria of Saxony	1569 – 7 March 1606	Duchy of Stettin (in co-rulership in Wolgast 1560-69; in Barth until 1603)	Clara of Brunswick-Lüneburg; 8 September 1572 eleven children Anna of Schleswig-Holstein-Sonderburg; 31 May 1601 no children	7 March 1606; Szczecin aged 61	
Regency of Boguslaus XIII [XI], Duke of Pomerania (1592-1598)						Reunited Barth with Wolgast in 1603. Left no descendants. His part joined Stettin.
Philip Julius	27 December 1584; Son of Ernest Louis and Sophie Hedwig of Brunswick-Wolfenbüttel	17 June 1592 – 6 February 1625	Duchy of Wolgast	Agnes of Brandenburg; 25 June 1604; Berlin no children	6 February 1625 aged 40	Reunited Barth with Wolgast in 1603. Left no descendants. His part joined Stettin.
Wolgast annexed to Stettin
George II	30 January 1582; Fourth son of Boguslaus XIII [XI] and Clara of Brunswick-Lüneburg	7 March 1606 – 27 March 1617	Duchy of Stettin (at Darłowo only)	Unmarried	27 March 1617 aged 35	Children of Bogislaw XIII (XI), divided their inheritance. As happened in the previous generation, each brother received a part of Stettin, and the parts were progressively reunited with each childless brother's death. In 1625 Boguslaus reunited all Pomerania, but as neither he nor his brothers had descendants, Pomerania was annexed by the Kingdom of Sweden by lack of heirs.
Philip II the Pious	29 July 1573; Franzburg; First son of Boguslaus XIII [XI] and Clara of Brunswick-Lüneburg	7 March 1606 – 3 February 1618	Duchy of Stettin	Sophia of Schleswig-Holstein-Sonderburg; 10 March 1607; Treptow an der Rega no children	3 February 1618; Szczecin aged 44	Children of Bogislaw XIII (XI), divided their inheritance. As happened in the previous generation, each brother received a part of Stettin, and the parts were progressively reunited with each childless brother's death. In 1625 Boguslaus reunited all Pomerania, but as neither he nor his brothers had descendants, Pomerania was annexed by the Kingdom of Sweden by lack of heirs.
Francis	24 March 1577; Barth; Second son of Boguslaus XIII [XI] and Clara of Brunswick-Lüneburg	7 March 1606 – 27 November 1620	Duchy of Stettin (at Barth until 1618)	Sophie of Saxony; 26 August 1610; Dresden no children	27 November 1620; Szczecin aged 43	Children of Bogislaw XIII (XI), divided their inheritance. As happened in the previous generation, each brother received a part of Stettin, and the parts were progressively reunited with each childless brother's death. In 1625 Boguslaus reunited all Pomerania, but as neither he nor his brothers had descendants, Pomerania was annexed by the Kingdom of Sweden by lack of heirs.
Boguslaus XIV [XII] the Sociable	31 March 1580; Barth; Third son of Boguslaus XIII [XI] and Clara of Brunswick-Lüneburg	7 March 1606 – 6 February 1625	Duchy of Stettin (at Darłowo until 1620)	Elisabeth of Schleswig-Holstein-Sonderburg; 1615 no children	10 March 1637; Szczecin aged 56	Children of Bogislaw XIII (XI), divided their inheritance. As happened in the previous generation, each brother received a part of Stettin, and the parts were progressively reunited with each childless brother's death. In 1625 Boguslaus reunited all Pomerania, but as neither he nor his brothers had descendants, Pomerania was annexed by the Kingdom of Sweden by lack of heirs.
Boguslaus XIV [XII] the Sociable	31 March 1580; Barth; Third son of Boguslaus XIII [XI] and Clara of Brunswick-Lüneburg	6 February 1625 – 10 March 1637	Duchy of Pomerania	Elisabeth of Schleswig-Holstein-Sonderburg; 1615 no children	10 March 1637; Szczecin aged 56	Children of Bogislaw XIII (XI), divided their inheritance. As happened in the previous generation, each brother received a part of Stettin, and the parts were progressively reunited with each childless brother's death. In 1625 Boguslaus reunited all Pomerania, but as neither he nor his brothers had descendants, Pomerania was annexed by the Kingdom of Sweden by lack of heirs.

== Principality of Rugia ==
The Principality was initially a Danish feud, under local rulers, which formed a dynasty.

=== House of Wizlaw ===
Ruler	Born	Reign	Ruling part	Consort	Death	Notes
Ratislaus	c.1105 ?	c.1130-1141	Principality of Rügen	Unknown three children	1141 aged 35–36	First known ruler of Rügen.
Tetzlav	c.1130 First son of Ratislaus	1141-c.1175	Principality of Rügen	Unknown at least one child	c.1175 aged 44–45?	Children of Raclaw, ruled jointly.
Jaromar I	c.1140 Second son of Ratislaus	1141-1218	Principality of Rügen	Hildegard of Denmark (1157-?) c.1180 five children	1218 aged 77–78?	Children of Raclaw, ruled jointly.
Barnuta	c.1180 First son of Jaromar I and Hildegard of Denmark	1218-1221	Principality of Rügen	Slavonica at least one child	c.1235 aged 54–55	Abdicated to his brother in 1221.
Vislav I	c.1180 Second son of Jaromar I and Hildegard of Denmark	1221 – 7 June 1250	Principality of Rügen	Margaret Sverkersdotter of Sweden (before 1200-5 March 1232) c.1215 six children	7 June 1250 aged 69–70	
Jaromar II	c.1218 Son of Vislav I and Margaret Sverkersdotter of Sweden	7 June 1250 – 20 August 1260	Principality of Rügen	Euphemia of Pomerelia (c.1225–1270) c.1240 three children	20 August 1260 aged 41–42	
Vislav II	1240; First son of Jaromar II and Euphemia of Pomerelia	20 August 1260 – 29 December 1302	Principality of Rügen	Agnes of Brunswick-Lüneburg c.1265 eight children	29 December 1302 aged 61–62	Children of Jaromar II, ruled jointly.
Jaromar III	1249; Second son of Jaromar II and Euphemia of Pomerelia	20 August 1260 – 1282	Principality of Rügen	Unmarried	1282 aged 42–43	Children of Jaromar II, ruled jointly.
Vislav III	1265; First son of Vislav II and Agnes of Brunswick-Lüneburg	29 December 1302 – 8 November 1325	Principality of Rügen	Margaret c.1305 no children Agnes of Lindow-Ruppin; 1310 three children	8 November 1325 aged 36–37	Children of Vislav II, ruled jointly. After their childless deaths, the principality was annexed to Pomerania-Wolgast.
Sambor	1267; Second son of Vislav II and Agnes of Brunswick-Lüneburg	29 December 1302 – 4 June 1304	Principality of Rügen	Unmarried	4 June 1304 aged 36–37	Children of Vislav II, ruled jointly. After their childless deaths, the principality was annexed to Pomerania-Wolgast.

== Duchy of Pomerelia ==
In 1155, the lands which belonged to Świętopełk I were organized by Sobieslaw I into the Duchy of Eastern Pomerania, also known as the Pomerelia, a provincial duchy of fragmented Poland. Sobiesław founded the House of Sobiesław.

The dukes of Pomerelia were using the Latin title dux Pomeraniae ("Duke of Pomerania") or dux Pomeranorum ("Duke of the Pomeranians").

The Pomerelian Griffin

=== Partitions of the Duchy of Pomerelia ===
In 1215, the duchy was divided in other smaller duchies: Gdańsk, Białogarda, Lubiszewo and Świecie.

Gdańsk Białogarda Lubiszewo Świecie

1155-1190
Duchy of Pomerelia-Gdańsk; Became independent in 1215.	Duchy of Pomerelia-Białogarda; Became independent in 1215.	Duchy of Pomerelia-Lubiszewo; Became independent in 1215.	Duchy of Pomerelia-Świecie; Became independent in 1215.

In 1271 the duchy is reunited and in 1294 reincorporated directly into Poland per the Treaty of Kępno.

=== Dukes of Pomerelia ===
==== Non-dynastic ====
Ruler	Born	Reign	Death	Ruling part	Consort	Notes
Świętopełk I	before 1106	1106–1113	1113	Pomerania-Gdańsk (future Pomerelia)	Unknown	He wasn't duke of Pomerelia, but ruled in the lands that became Pomerelia 40 years later.

==== House of Sambor (1155–1296) ====
Ruler	Born	Reign	Death	Ruling part	Consort	Notes
Sobieslaw I	c.1130	1155-1178	1178	Pomerelia	Unknown before 1150 two children	
Sambor I	c.1150	1178-1205	7 February or 30 December 1205	Pomerelia	Unknown before 1205 two children	
Mestwin I the Peaceful	c.1160	1205-1220	1/2 July 1220	Pomerelia	Swinisława of Poland c.1190 eight children	Brother of Sambor.
Świętopełk II the Great	c.1190	1220-1266	11 January 1266	Pomerelia-Gdańsk	Salomea of Halych before 1220 one child Euphrosyne of Greater Poland c.1220 two children Hermengard of Schwerin c.1230 two children	Son of Mestwin I. Ruler in Gdańsk, used the title Dux (Duke) from 1227.
Wartislaw I	c.1195	1220–1233	11 January 1233	Pomerelia-Białogarda-Lubiszewo-Świecie	unmarried	Son of Mestwin I. Ruler in Świecie, used the title Dux (Duke) from 1227. After his death his domains were divided between the younger brothers.
Racibor I	c.1212	1233–1262	6 June 1272	Pomerelia-Białogarda	unmarried	Son of Mestwin I. Joined the Teutonic Order in 1262, and -Białogarda was annexed by -Gdańsk.
Sambor II	c.1212	1233–1270	30 December 1277	Pomerelia-Lubiszewo	Matilda of Mecklenburg six children	Son of Mestwin I. He initially resided at a burgh located in the later village of Lubiszewo. After the town of Tczew was founded nearby in the course of the German Ostsiedlung, the dukes shifted their residence to the town.
Mestwin II	1220	1233–1270	29 December 1294	Pomerelia-Świecie	Judith of Wettin before 1275 two children Euphrosyne of Opole; 1275 (div.1288) no children Sulisława after 1288 no children	Son of Swiatopelk I. In 1270, he reunited the duchy.
Wartislaw II	1237	1266–1270	9 May 1271	Pomerelia-Gdańsk	unmarried	Son of Swietopelk II. After his death without descendants, Gdańsk was absorbed by the reunited Duchy of Pomerelia.
Mestwin II	1220	1270–1294	29 December 1294	Pomerelia	Judith of Wettin before 1275 two children Euphrosyne of Opole; 1275 (div.1288) no children Sulisława after 1288 no children	Reunites the duchy in 1270. In 1282, he transfers suzerainty back to Poland, and in 1294 Pomerelia was reincorporated directly into Poland.

=== Later history of Pomerelia ===
- 1296–1299 Part of Kuyavia within Poland
- 1299–1308 Part of Poland
- 1308–1454 Part of the State of the Teutonic Order
- 1454–1466 Thirteen Years' War between Poland and the Teutonic Order
- 1466–1772 Pomeranian Voivodeship (1466–1772) within the Kingdom of Poland, which was part of the Polish–Lithuanian Commonwealth from 1569
- 1772–1793 Mostly annexed by Prussia in the First Partition of Poland, except for Gdańsk, which remained with Poland until Second Partition of Poland
- 1793–1807 Province of West Prussia within the Kingdom of Prussia (Prussian Partition of Poland)
- 1807–1814 Part of Prussia, except for the Free City of Danzig (Gdańsk) a Napoleonic client state, with François Joseph Lefebvre ennobled as Duc de Dantzic (1808–1820)
- 1814–1918 Part of the Kingdom of Prussia, which was part of the German Empire from 1871
  - 1814–1829 Province of West Prussia
  - 1829–1878 Province of Prussia
  - 1878–1919 Province of West Prussia
- 1920–1939 Part of Poland as the Pomeranian Voivodeship, except of Free City of Danzig, a League of Nations mandate
- 1939–1945 German occupation: Danzig-West Prussia, province of Nazi Germany
- 1945–present Part of Poland again

== See also ==
- History of Pomerania
