= Duchy of Pomerania-Stargard =

Former monarchy in Europe

Duchy of Pomerania-Stargard Herzogtum Pommern-Stargard (German) Księstwo stargardzkie (Polish) Ducatus Stargardensis (Latin)
- 1377–1478
- Coat of arms

- Pomerania in 1400, including the Pomerania-Stolp, with which Stargard was in the personal union.
- Status: State of the Holy Roman Empire; Personal union with Pomerania-Stolp (1395–1402, 1403–1478); Fiefdom of Kingdom of Poland (1410–1478)
- Capital: Stargard
- Religion: Roman Catholic
- Government: Feudal duchy
- Duke
  - 1377–1402 (co-first): Barnim V
  - 1377–1418 (co-first): Bogislaw VIII
  - 1474–1478 (last): Bogislaw X
- Historical era: High Middle Ages
  - Separation from Pomerania-Stolp: 1377
  - Personal union with Pomerania-Stolp: 1395
  - Becoming the fiefdom of Kingdom of Poland: 1410
  - Incorporation into Duchy of Pomerania: 1478
| Preceded by | Succeeded by |
| Pomerania-Stolp | Duchy of Pomerania |
- Today part of: Poland

The Duchy of Pomerania-Stargard, (Note: German: Herzogtum Pommern-Stargard) also known as the Duchy of Stargard (Note: Polish: Księstwo stargardzkie; Latin: Ducatus Stargardensis) located in Western Pomerania in the Holy Roman Empire, was a feudal duchy with its capital in Stargard. It was formed in 1377, when it separated from Pomerania-Stolp. In 1395, it fell under the control of the Duke of Pomerania-Stolp, and continued to be ruled by the successive Dukes of the House of Griffins until its dissolution in 1478, when it was incorporated into a unified Duchy of Pomerania.

== History ==
=== Bogislaw VIII and Barnim V ===
After the death of Duke Casimir IV of Pomerania-Stolp in 1377, Pomerania-Stargard separated from the duchy, forming a separate state with the capital in Stargard. Pomerania-Stargard was ruled by two brothers, Bogislaw VIII and Barnim V, who inherited the lands from Casimir. In 1386, Bogislaw VIII and his brother Wartislaw VII signed an alliance with the State of the Teutonic Order, hoping to reclaim the lands that belonged to the previous duke, Casimir IV. In 1390, Bogislaw VIII switched sides, signing an alliance with the Kingdom of Poland. In 1395, Bogislaw VIII allied with Władysław II Jagiełło, and in 1403, he became his courtier, pledging his alliance to Poland, in case of war against the Teutonic Order.

In 1395, after the death of Wartislaw VII (older brother of Stargard dukes), they inherited Pomerania-Stolp, making the personal union between two states. In 1402, they divided the lands between each other, with Bogislaw VIII becoming the sole ruler of Pomerania-Stargard and the duchy receiving the lands of Wolin, Kamień, Gryfice, Stargard, Trzebiatów and Białogard. After the death of Barnim V in 1403, Bogislaw VIII became the duke of Pomerania-Stolp again, reunifying the two duchies.

In 1409, during the Polish–Lithuanian–Teutonic War, Bogislaw VIII again allied with the Teutonic Order. He switched sides the following year and allied with Poland in 1410. He fought on their side during the Battle of Grunwald. On 29 August 1410, he pledged the submission of his duchies to the king of Poland. In the exchange, he received Lauenburg and Bütow Land as well as Człuchów, Biały Bór, Debrzno, Świdwin and Czarne. Bogislaw VIII died on 11 February 1418.

== List of rulers ==
- Bogislaw VIII and Barnim V (1377–1402)
- Bogislaw VIII (1402–1418)
- Bogislav IX (1418–1446) (Sophie of Holstein as regent from 1418 to 1425)
- Eric I (1449–1459)
- Eric II (1459–1474)
- Bogislaw X (1474–1478)

== Bibliography ==
- Źródła do kaszubsko-polskich aspektów Pomorza Zachodniego do roku 1945, vol. 1 by B. Wachowiak, in Pomorze Zachodnie pod rządami książąt plemiennych i władców z dynastii Gryfitów: (990-1121-1637-1648/1653) by Z. Szultka. Polska Akademia Nauk, Instytut Historii im. Tadeusza Manteuffla, Wydawnictwo Poznańskie, Zrzeszenie Kaszubsko-Pomorskie, Poznań–Gdańsk. 2006. ISBN 83-7177-459-1. (Polish)
- Gryfici. Książęta Pomorza Zachodniego by K. Kozłowski and J. Podralski. Szczecin. Krajowa Agencja Wydawnicza. 1985. ISBN 83-03-00530-8, OCLC 189424372. (Polish)
- Rodowód książąt pomorskich by E. Rymar. Szczecin. Pomeranian Library. 2005. ISBN 83-87879-50-9, OCLC 69296056. (Polish)
