= Barnim VI =

Barnim VI, Duke of Pomerania
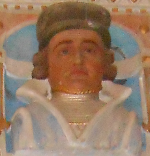
- Sculpture from the epitaph in Kenz
- Born: c. 1365
- Died: 22 September 1405; Pütnitz, near Ribnitz-Damgarten
- Buried: Kenz, now part of Kenz-Küstrow
- Noble family: House of Griffin
- Spouse: Veronica of Hohenzollern
- Issue: Barnim VII, Duke of Pomerania; Wartislaw IX, Duke of Pomerania
- Father: Wartislaw VI, Duke of Pomerania
- Mother: Anne of Mecklenburg-Stargard

Barnim VI, Duke of Pomerania (c. 1365 – 22 September 1405 in Pütnitz, near Ribnitz-Damgarten) was duke of Pomerania-Wolgast from 1394 to 1405. He was the son of Wartislaw VI of Pomerania-Wolgast.

Barnim is known for his engagement in piracy. He erected a fort and a port for this purpose in Ahrenshoop, which was destroyed by Rostock in 1395. He allowed the Victual Brothers, a pirate organization assaulting vessels of the Hanseatic League in the Baltic Sea, to use the Peene river as a winter refuge and the Bay of Greifswald as a basis. In 1398, he signed a treaty with the Teutonic Knights not to further support the Victual Brothers (then also "Likedeelers"), but kept on engaging in piracy himself. On one of his expeditions, he was caught by the Hanseatic League in Copenhagen's port. From 1400-1403, he aided the dukes of Mecklenburg-Werle in their campaigns against Lübeck. Barnim himself was wounded once at Lübeck's gates.

In 1405, Barnim died of the Black Death. To avoid this fate, he went on a pilgrimage to Kenz near Barth, but died on his way in Pütnitz (a part of today's Ribnitz-Damgarten) on 23 September 1405. He was buried in Kenz, where a large wooden statue resembling Barnim was furnished.

== Marriage and issue ==
He married Veronica of Hohenzollern, daughter of Frederick V, Burgrave of Nuremberg, and had at least two sons:

- Barnim VII, Duke of Pomerania
- Wartislaw IX, Duke of Pomerania
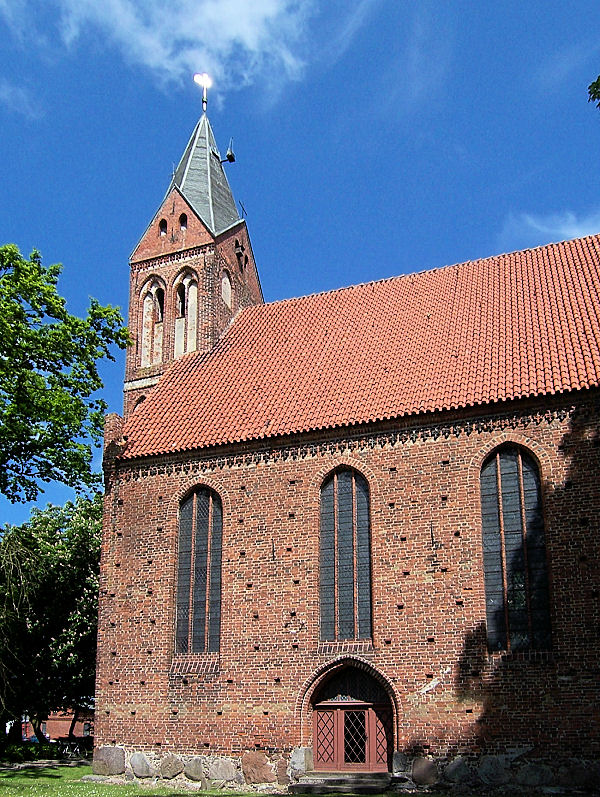
Kenz church. In the Late Middle Ages, the church was a prime destination for pilgrimages due to a nearby holy spring. Barnim, infected with the Black Death, died during his pilgrimage and was buried in Kenz.

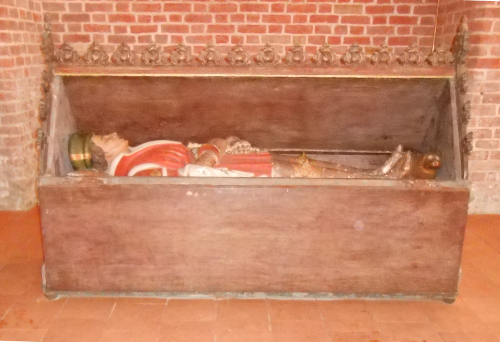
Cenotaph for Barnim VI in St. Mary's church, Kenz, containing a wooden statue

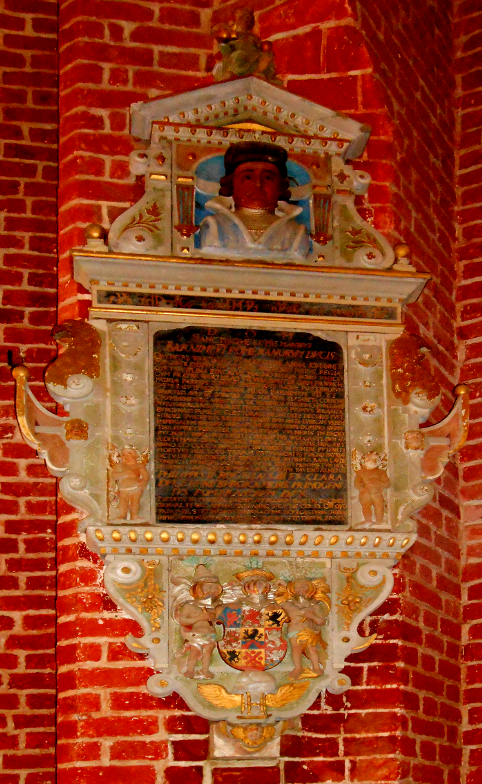
Epitaph for Barnim VI in St. Mary's church, Kenz

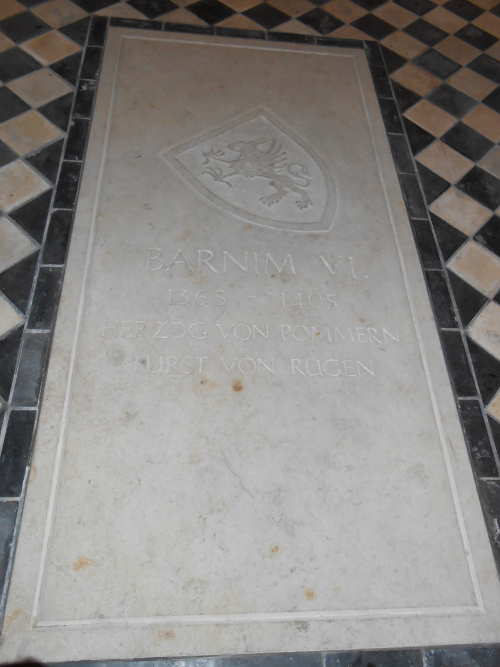
Tombstone for Barnim VI in St. Mary's church, Kenz

== See also ==
- List of Pomeranian duchies and dukes
- History of Pomerania
- Duchy of Pomerania
- House of Pomerania

== Ancestors ==
Ancestors of Barnim VI

8. Wartislaw IV, Duke of Pomerania
4. Barnim IV, Duke of Pomerania
9. Elisabeth of Lindow-Ruppin
2. Wartislaw VI, Duke of Pomerania
10. John II of Werle
5. Sophie of Werle
11. Matilda of Brunswick-Grubenhagen
1. Barnim VI, Duke of Pomerania
12. Henry II of Mecklenburg
6. John I, Duke of Mecklenburg-Stargard
13. Anna of Saxony
3. Anne of Mecklenburg-Stargard
14. Adolph VII, Count of Holstein-Schauenburg
7. Anna of Holstein-Pinneberg and Schauenburg
15. Heilwig of Lippe

Barnim VI House of Griffins Born: c. 1365 Died: 22 September 1405
| Preceded by Wartislaw VI | Duke of Pomerania-Wolgast; 1394-1405 | Succeeded by Wartislaw IX |
