= Wartislaw =

Wartislaw (Polish Warcisław) is a Polish name. It may refer to:

- Wartislaw I, Duke of Pomerania (c. 1091-1135)
- Wartislaw II, Duke of Pomerania (1160-1184)
- Wartislaw III, Duke of Pomerania (1210-1264)
- Wartislaw IV, Duke of Pomerania (before 1290–1326)
- Wartislaw V, Duke of Pomerania (1326-1390)
- Wartislaw VI, Duke of Pomerania (1345-1394)
- Wartislaw VII, Duke of Pomerania (1363/1365–1394/1395)
- Wartislaw VIII, Duke of Pomerania (1373-1415)
- Wartislaw IX, Duke of Pomerania (c. 1400-1457)
- Wartislaw X, Duke of Pomerania (1435-1478)
