= Congress of Kraków =

Meeting of European monarchs in Poland in 1364

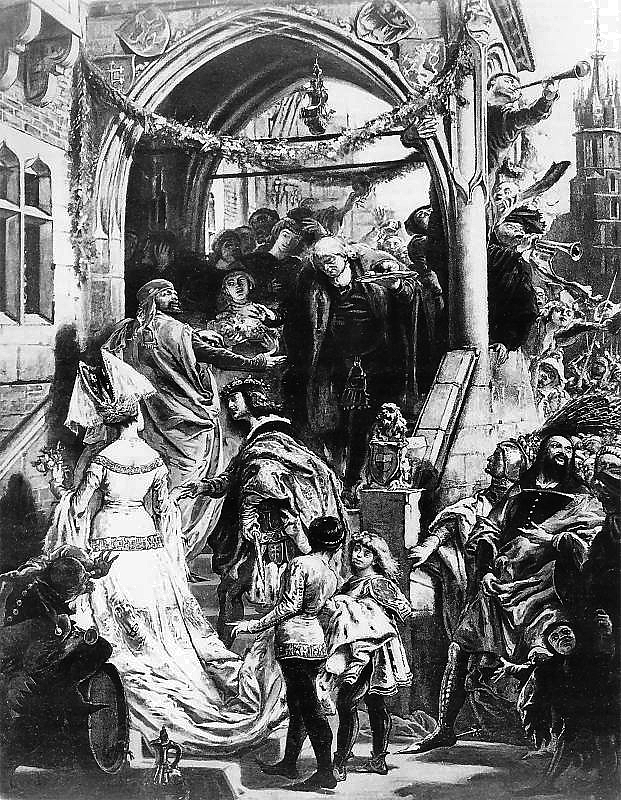
Congress of Kraków

The Congress of Kraków (Polish: Zjazd krakowski) was a meeting of monarchs initiated by King Casimir III the Great of Poland and held in Kraków (Cracow) around September 22–27, 1364. The pretext for calling the meeting was very likely a proposed anti-Ottoman crusade, but the Congress was actually concerned mostly with European diplomacy issues, of which preeminent were peaceful relations and the balance of power in central Europe and negotiating a common response to the Turkish threat through the project of a central European league of states.

The participants, who were guests of the Polish king, were Charles IV, Holy Roman Emperor, King Louis I of Hungary, King Valdemar IV of Denmark, King Peter I of Cyprus, Siemowit III of Masovia, Bolko II of Świdnica, Władysław Opolczyk, Rudolf IV, Duke of Austria, Bogislaw V, Duke of Pomerania, Casimir IV, Duke of Pomerania, Otto V, Duke of Bavaria and Louis VI the Roman.

The Congress, which took place in lavish surroundings, was intended as a manifestation of the Polish king's power and wealth and echoed throughout Europe. It included a famous banquet at the house of the Kraków merchant Mikołaj Wierzynek, which was organised by the city council. The occasion for the feast, which, according to Jan Długosz, lasted for 21 days, was the recent wedding of Charles IV and Casimir's granddaughter Elizabeth of Pomerania.

The several medieval sources available do not always agree on the timing and other issues. Possibly, there were two separate congresses, one in 1363 that had to do with the marriage and another in 1364 that was the more political congregation of the monarchs. In 1364, among the issues discussed were the Angevin succession to the Polish throne and the ratification of the peace treaty involving Louis I and Charles IV among others that was arbitrated by Casimir III and Bolko II. An important source is a poem of Guillaume de Machaut, who described the banquet in Wierzynek's house
