= Casimir IV =

Casimir IV may refer to:

- Casimir IV Jagiellon (1427–1492), King of Poland and Grand Duke of Lithuania
- Casimir IV, Duke of Pomerania (1351–1377)
