= Barnim VII =

Barnim VII of Pomerania
- Born: 1390
- Died: 22 September 1450 (aged 59–60); Wolgast
- Noble family: House of Griffin
- Father: Barnim VI, Duke of Pomerania
- Mother: Veronica of Hohenzollern

Barnim VII (1390 – 22 September 1450 in Wolgast) was the son of Duke Barnim VI, Duke of Pomerania. He was from 1425 Duke of Pomerania-Wolgast-Demmin and later also Duke of Pomerania-Barth. He supported his brother Wartislaw IX, Duke of Pomerania against Brandenburg.

== Ancestors ==
Ancestors of Barnim VII

8. Barnim IV, Duke of Pomerania
4. Wartislaw VI, Duke of Pomerania
9. Sophie of Werle
2. Barnim VI, Duke of Pomerania
10. John I, Duke of Mecklenburg-Stargard
5. Anne of Mecklenburg-Stargard
11. Anna of Holstein-Pinneberg and Schauenburg
1. Barnim VII, Duke of Pomerania
12. John II of Nuremberg
6. Frederick V, Burgrave of Nuremberg
13. Elisabeth of Henneberg-Schleusingen
3. Veronica of Hohenzollern
14. Frederick II, Margrave of Meissen
7. Elisabeth of Meissen
15. Matilda of Bavaria
