= Bogislaw VIII =

Duke of Pomerania

Bogisław VIII
- Duke of Pomerania
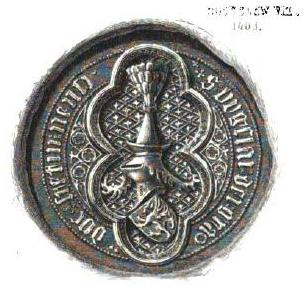
- Seal of Bogisaw VIII (1403)
- Born: c. 1364
- Died: 11 February 1418
- Noble family: House of Griffin
- Spouse: Sophie of Holstein
- Issue Detail: Bogislaw IX, Duke of Pomerania
- Father: Bogislaw V, Duke of Pomerania
- Mother: Adelheid of Brunswick-Grubenhagen

Bogisław VIII (c. 1364 – 11 February 1418), a member of the House of Griffin, was Duke of Pomerania ruling in Pomerania-Stolp from 1395 until his death. He also served as administrator of the Prince-Bishopric of Cammin from 1387 and as Cammin Prince-bishop from 1394 to 1398.

== Background ==
Bogisław was a younger son of Duke Bogisław V of Pomerania from his second marriage with the Welf princess Adelheid, a daughter of Duke Ernest I of Brunswick-Grubenhagen. Upon the partition of the Duchy of Pomerania in 1368/72, his father received the eastern lands around Stolp (now Słupsk). Upon his death in 1374, he was succeeded by his first-born son Casimir IV of Pomerania, Bogisław's half-brother and, by his mother Elizabeth, a grandson of King Casimir III of Poland. After Duke Casimir IV was killed while fighting for the Polish inheritance against his Piast cousin Prince Władysław the White three years later, Bogisław became co-ruler of Pomerania-Stolp, together with his brothers Wartislaw VII and Barnim V.

== Rule with Wartislaw and Barnim ==
As a younger son, Bogisław possibly had prepared for an ecclesiastical career and suspiciously eyed the appointment of John Brun, chancellor of Wenceslaus IV of Bohemia, then king of Germany, as Bishop of Cammin in 1386. To defend the bishopric's autonomy, he concluded an agreement with the cathedral chapter the next year, granting him the rights of a diocesan administrator. Though rigorously opposed by the bishop, Bogisław prevailed and could assume the episcopal ministry himself upon John Brun's death in 1394, however, he resigned four years later in favour of the Culm bishop Nicholas.

The reign of Bogisław and his brothers in Pomerania was influenced by the ongoing conflicts between his eastern neighbours, the Kingdom of Poland and the State of the Teutonic Order. The Pomeranian dukes, whose territory was the only land route to Teutonic Prussia not controlled by Poland, exploited this conflict by frequently changing sides. Soon after the Lithuanian grand duke Jogaila was crowned King of Poland (as Władysław II Jagiełło), the dukes of Pomerania-Stolp left an alliance and, late in 1388, sided with Poland, who had promised to partially respect their claims as King Casimir III's heirs. Thence, the nobles of Pomerania-Stolp robbed the Teutonic Knights and their supply routes, provoking a counter-attack that destroyed many noble strongholds including the fortifications of Köslin (Koszalin). Bogislaw VIII, Barnim V and Wartislaw VII reacted by siding with the Polish king and negotiating mutual trade alleviations.

== Deaths of brothers ==
When their brother Wartislaw VII died in 1395, Bogisław and Barnim V settled a treaty with Teutonic Prussia in neighbouring Pomerelia (Gdańsk Pomerania), which was in constant conflict with Poland, to safeguard their supply routes in return for financial credit. Their cousins, Duke Swantibor III of Pomerania-Stettin and his brother Bogisław VII, changed sides in 1395 and allied with the knights in return for economic aid. However, in 1397 Barnim V concluded an alliance with Poland, married Vytautas' niece Hedwig and entered into Jogaila's service in 1401 until he died in 1402 or 1404.

== Sole rule ==
Bogisław, now sole ruler of Pomerania-Stolp, began a lengthy quarrel with Bishop Nicholas of Cammin about several ecclesiastical estates, which led to Nicholas' expulsion and the appointment of Magnus of Saxe-Lauenburg in 1410. Like his brother Barnim, Duke Bogisław also entered into King Jogaila's service, but changed sides in 1407/08, when he allied with the Teutonic Knights under Grand Master Ulrich von Jungingen and settled their common border. Nevertheless, Bogisław refused any armed support and when the Knights lost the Battle of Tannenberg in July 1410, he changed sides again and allied with Poland in return for the Bütow, Schlochau, Preußisch-Friedland, Baldenburg, Hammerstein and Schivelbein areas, which Poland had gained from Teutonic Prussia before. This, however, was cancelled according to the First Peace of Thorn in 1411.

While Bogisław upheld his alliance with Jogaila, Konrad Bonow of the Cammin diocese in 1414 established an alliance with the Teutonic Knights against both Bogisław and Jogaila, which was turned into a truce soon after. In 1417, Bogisław and the Teutonic knights settled their common border in the Hammerstein area, ending their conflicts. Bogisław died in 1418 and was buried in the cathedral of Cammin. He was succeeded by his son Bogisław IX, who, together with all the other Pomeranian dukes, in 1423 again allied with the Teutonic Knights.

== Family ==
He married Sophie of Holstein, the daughter of Henry II, Count of Holstein-Rendsburg. They had at least three children:

- Bogislaw IX, Duke of Pomerania (c. 1407/1410–1446)
- Adelheid of Pomerania (1410–after 1444/45), married Bernard II, Duke of Saxe-Lauenburg in 1429
- Ingeborg of Pomerania, who married Henry, Duke of Mecklenburg-Stargard

== See also ==
- Pomerania during the Late Middle Ages
- Partitions of the Duchy of Pomerania
- House of Pomerania

Bogislaw VIII House of Griffins Born: c. 1364 Died: 11 February 1418
Catholic Church titles
Regnal titles
Preceded by John II	Administrator of Cammin prince-bishopric due to John II's absence 1387–1392	Succeeded by John II
Catholic Church titles
Regnal titles
Preceded by John II	Prince-Bishop of Cammin rivalled by John III; 1394–1398	Succeeded by Nikolaus Bock
Regnal titles
Preceded by Wartislaw VII	Duke of Pomerania-Stolp; 1395–1418	Succeeded by Bogislaw IX
