= Siemomysł (disambiguation) =

Siemomysł was a 10th-century Duke of Polans, forerunners of the kings of Poland.

Siemomysł can also refer to:-

- Siemomysł, Duke of Pomerania, an 11th-century ruler
- Ziemomysł of Kuyavia, a 13th-century ruler
