= Margaret of Masovia =

Margaret of Masovia Polish: Małgorzata (before 1358 – 14 May 1388/4 April 1396) was Duchess of Pomerania and Brzeg, by her marriages to Casimir IV, Duke of Pomerania and then to Henry VII of Brzeg. She was a member of the House of Piast.

Margaret was a daughter of Siemowit III of Masovia and his wife Euphemia of Opawa. Her paternal grandparents were Trojden I of Masovia and his wife Maria, daughter of Yuri I of Galicia and Euphemia of Kuyavia.

== Life ==
In 1369 Margaret married her first husband Casimir IV, Duke of Pomerania, son of Bogislaw V, Duke of Pomerania and Elizabeth of Poland. The marriage was arranged because Casimir was the grandson of Casimir III the Great and was a possible successor for his grandfather (who never had any sons). Therefore, this marriage was a very important alliance and it had been hoped it would possibly introduce the Masovian blood into the Polish royal family.

Casimir had been married once before to Johanna of Lithuania, who had died the year before Margaret's marriage, without any children.

After the death of Margaret's mother, Siemowit remarried to Anna of Ziębice. They had a couple of children who died young before Anna gave birth to a healthy son, Henry. Siemowit did not believe the child was his; he accused his wife of adultery and had her strangled. Henry was then cast away. After a few years it was reported that the child had physical similarities to his father. Margaret decided to rescue her half-brother and took him to her mansion in Słupsk. Siemowit later accepted that the child was his and made him Bishop of Płock.

Soon after her marriage, Margaret adopted an illegitimate son of King Casimir.

On January 2, 1377, Margaret's husband Casimir died. They had no children.

Two years after the death of her first husband in 1379, Margaret remarried to Henry VII of Brzeg. They were married for eight years and had two children:

1. Margareta (b. 1380/84 - d. after 2 October 1408); she was betrothed to the Sigismund of Luxemburg, King of Bohemia and Emperor, but the marriage never took place.
2. Louis II (b. 1380/85 - d. 30 May 1436).

Margaret's date of death is disputed but it is believed that she died on either 14 May 1388 or 4 April 1396. Her husband died in 1399.
