= Barnim V =

Duke of Pomerania

- Duke of Pomerania
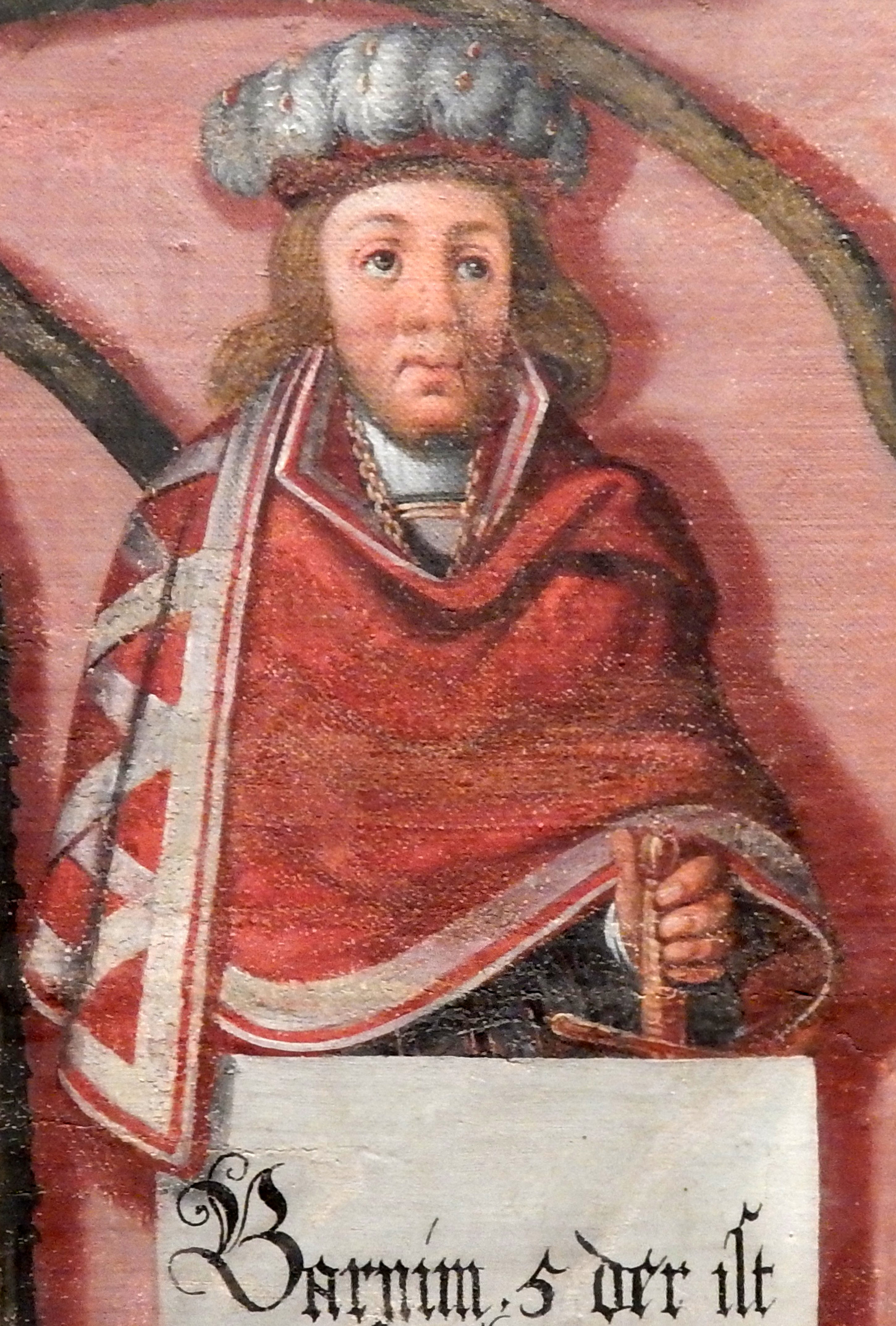
- Barnim V, Duke of Pomerania
- Born: 1369
- Died: c. 1402–1403
- Noble family: House of Griffins
- Father: Bogislaw V, Duke of Pomerania
- Mother: Adelheid of Brunswick-Grubenhagen

Barnim V (1369–1402/1403) was one of the Dukes of Pomerania. He was the son of Bogislaw V. He ruled over parts of Pomerania-Stolp; first the territories near Stargard Szczeciński, and in his last years, 1402–1403, he co-ruled Pomerania-Stolp with his brother, Bogislaw VIII.

Sources on the exact date of his death vary, he died in 1402 (16 May) or early 1403 (13 February).

He married a Lithuanian princess, one of the relatives of Vytautas; they had no children.

He was brother in law to Adelaide of Brunswick and he had a residence in Słupsk.

== Ancestors ==
Ancestors of Barnim V

16. Barnim I, Duke of Pomerania
8. Bogislaw IV, Duke of Pomerania
17. Margaret of Adenoys
4. Wartislaw IV, Duke of Pomerania
18. Wizlaw II, Prince of Rügen
9. Margaret of Rugia
19. Agnes of Brunswick-Lüneburg
2. Bogislaw V, Duke of Pomerania
20. Günther I, Count of Lindow
10. Ulrich I, Count of Lindow-Ruppin
21. Euphemia of Rugia
5. Elisabeth of Lindow-Ruppin
22. Meinhard, Count of Schladen
11. Adelaide of Schaden
23. Adelaide of Warberg
1. Barnim V, Duke of Pomerania
24. Albert I, Duke of Brunswick-Lüneburg
12. Henry I, Duke of Brunswick-Grubenhagen
25. Adelaide of Montferrat
6. Ernest I, Duke of Brunswick-Grubenhagen
26. Albert II, Margrave of Meissen
13. Agnes of Meissen
27. Margaret of Sicily
3. Adelheid of Brunswick-Grubenhagen
28. Otto V, Count of Everstein-Polle
14. Herman III, Count of Everstein-Polle
29. Luitgard of Schladen
7. Adelheid of Everstein-Polle
30. Simon I, Lord of Lippe
15. Adelaide of Lippe
31. Adelaide of Waldeck
