= Sulisława =

Sulisława (died after 25 December 1294) was the daughter of a Pomeranian knight.

She was originally a nun in Słupsk, but in about 1285, she became the mistress of Mestwin II. On 26 August 1288, after his divorce from Euphrosyne of Opole, Mestwin married Sulisława.

== Sources ==
- B. Śliwiński Poczet książąt gdańskich, Gdańsk 2006, s. 53
- B. Śliwiński Kronikarskie niedyskrecje, czyli życie prywatne Piastów, Gdańsk 2004, s. 76-77
