= Wartislaw VI =

Wartislaw VI of Pomerania
- Duke of Pomerania-Wolgast
- Born: 1345
- Died: 13 June 1394 (aged 48–49); Klępino Białogardzkie
- Noble family: House of Griffin
- Spouse: Anne of Mecklenburg-Stargard
- Issue: Barnim VI, Duke of Pomerania; Wartislaw VIII, Duke of Pomerania
- Father: Barnim IV, Duke of Pomerania
- Mother: Sophie of Werle

Wartislaw VI of Pomerania (1345 – 13 June 1394) was a member of the House of Griffin. From 1365 to 1377, he ruled Pomerania-Wolgast jointly with his brother Bogislaw VI. From 1377 until his death, he was the sole ruler of Pomerania-Barth.

== Life ==
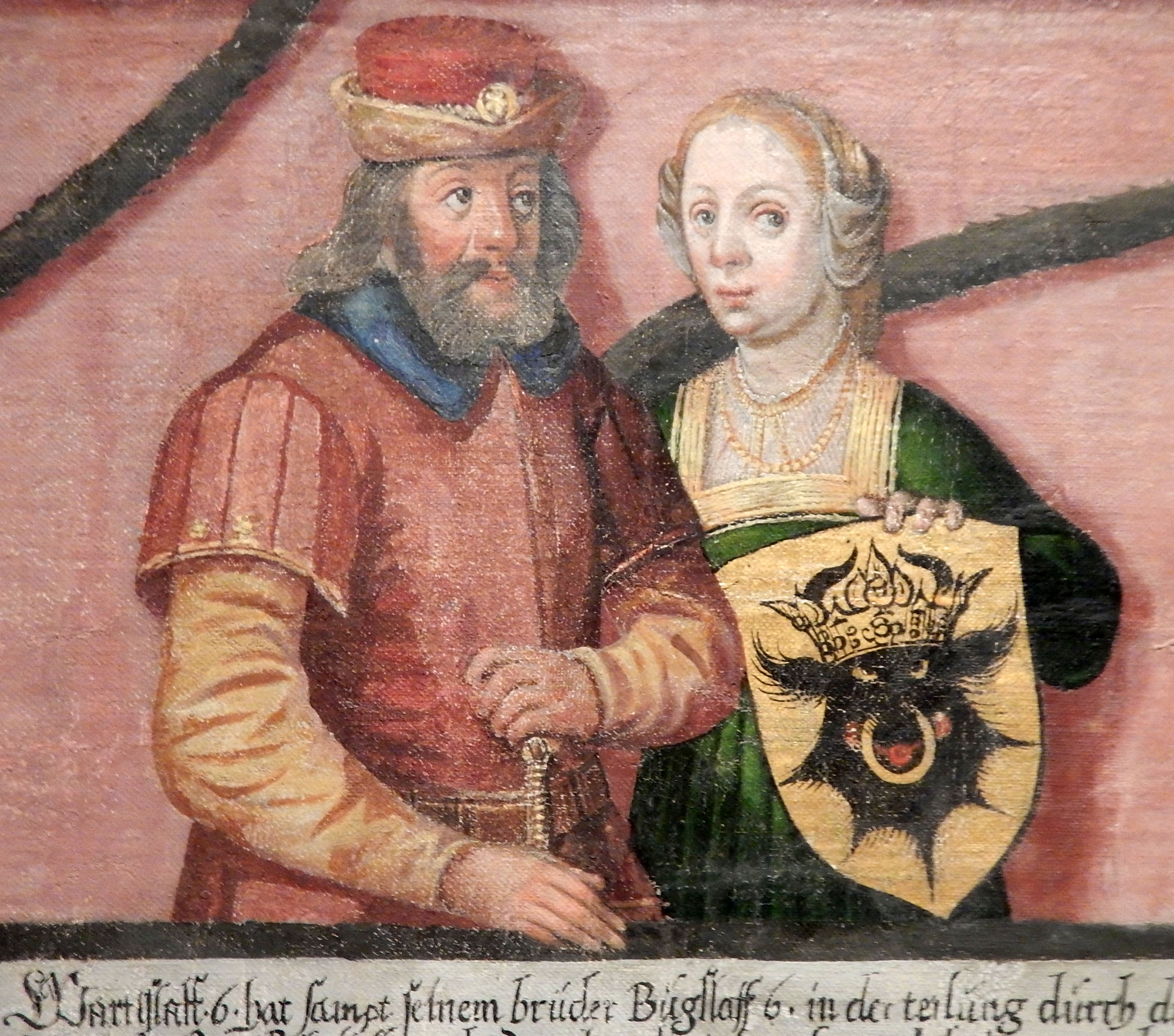
Wartislaw VI., 1st Duke of Pomerania-Barth, with his wife Anne of Mecklenburg-Stargard (on the family tree of the House of Griffins, drawn by Cornelius Krommeny (1598)

He was the eldest son of the Duke Barnim IV of Pomerania-Wolgast-Rügen and his wife, Sophie of Werle.

After the death of his father Barnim IV in 1365, Pomerania-Wolgast was divided in the 1372 Treaty of Anklam into the eastern Duchy of Pomerania-Stolp (from the Swine River to the Leba River), ruled by his uncle Bogislaw V and the western Duchy of Pomerania-Wolgast, ruled jointly by Wartislaw VI and his younger brother Bogislaw VI. In 1377, Pomerania-Wolgast was divided into a smaller Pomerania-Wolgast, ruled by Bogislaw VI, and Pomerania-Barth ruled by Wartislaw VI. In 1396, Bogislaw VI died at Klępino Białogardzkie, without a male heir, and the two parts of Pomerania-Wolgast were reunited under Wartislaw VI.

== Marriage and issue ==
He married Anne of Mecklenburg-Stargard, a daughter of Duke John I of Mecklenburg-Stargard. They had three children:

- Barnim VI, Duke of Pomerania
- Wartislaw VIII, Duke of Pomerania
- Sophie, married Henry the Mild, Duke of Brunswick-Lüneburg

== Ancestors ==
Ancestors of Wartislaw VI

8. Bogislaw IV, Duke of Pomerania
4. Wartislaw IV, Duke of Pomerania
9. Margaret of Rugia
2. Barnim IV, Duke of Pomerania
10. Ulrich I, Count of Lindow-Ruppin
5. Elisabeth of Lindow-Ruppin
11. Adelaide of Schladen
1. Wartislaw VI, Duke of Pomerania
12. John I of Werle
6. John II of Werle
13. Sophie of Lindow-Ruppin
3. Sophie of Werle
14. Henry I, Duke of Brunswick-Lüneburg
7. Matilda of Brunswick-Grubenhagen
15. Agnes of Meissen

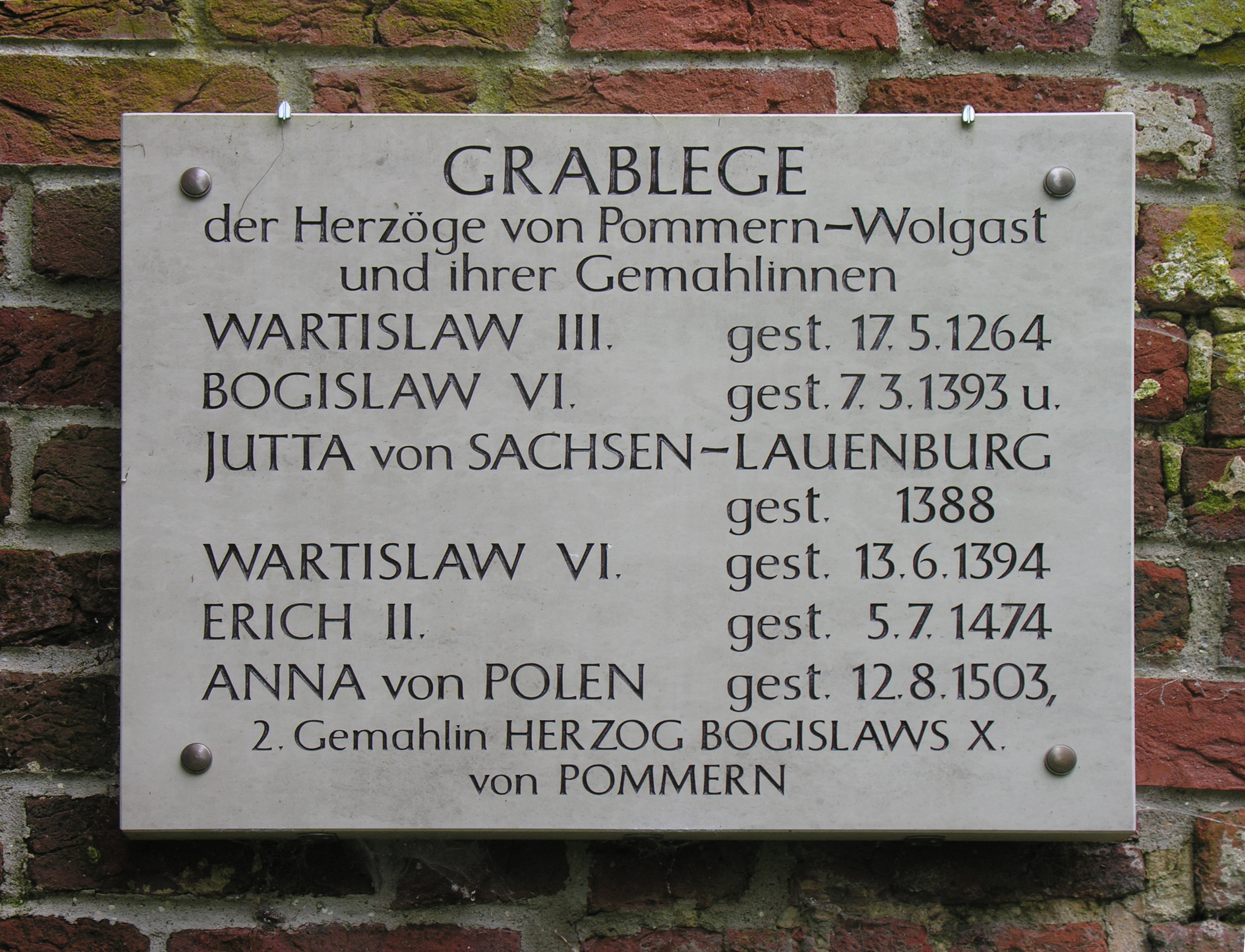
Plaque in Eldena, marking the family grave

Wartislaw VI House of Griffins Born: c. 1345 Died: 13 June 1394
Preceded by Barnim IV	Duke of Pomerania-Wolgast; 1377–1394	Succeeded by Barnim VI
