= Maria of Masovia =

Duchess of Pomerania (1408/15–1454)

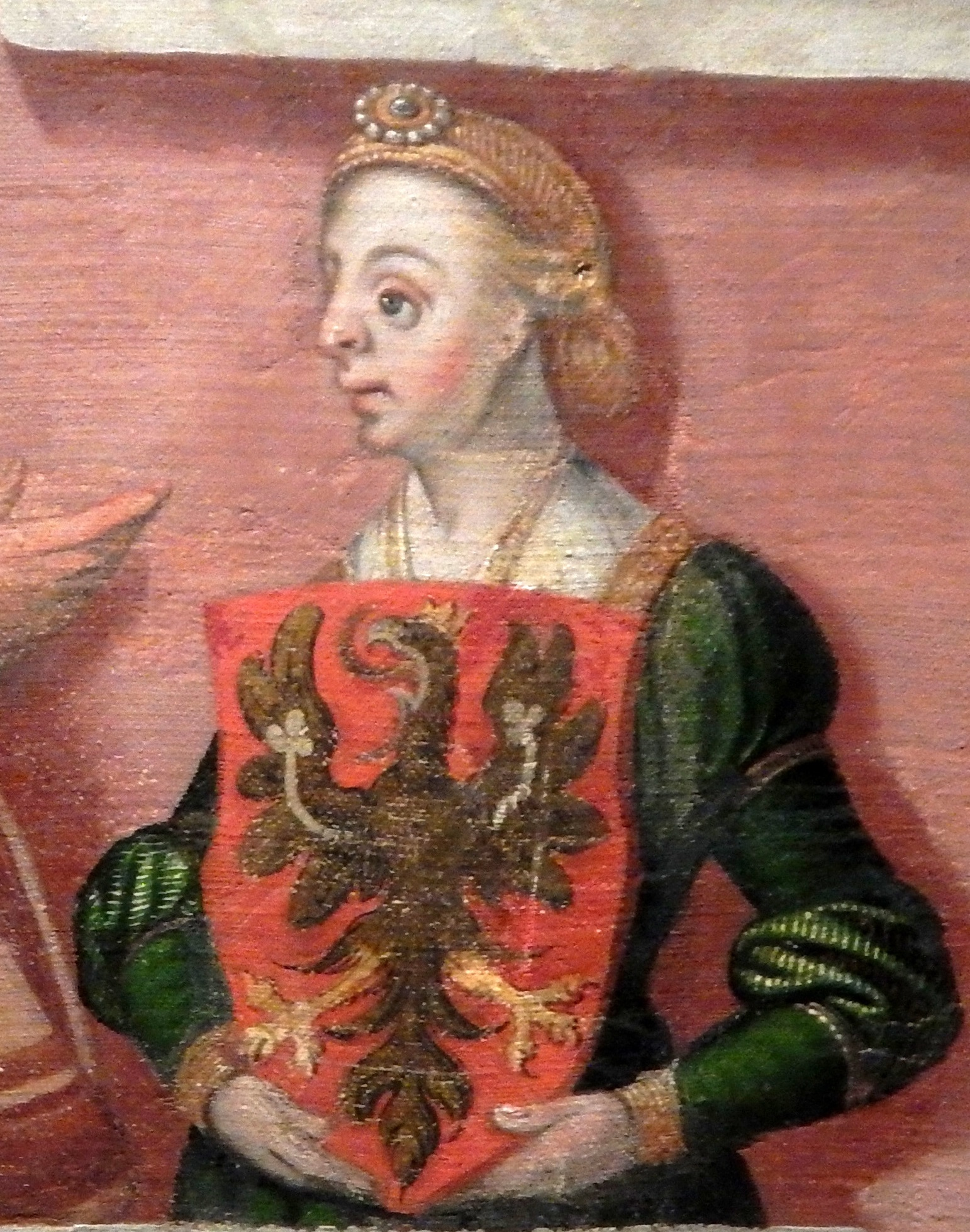
Maria on a family tree by Cornelius Krommeny

Maria of Masovia (pl: Maria mazowiecka; 1408/15–14 February 1454) was a Duchess of Pomerania by marriage to Bogislaw IX, Duke of Pomerania, and regent of Pomerania from 1446 to 1449.

== Life ==
She was the sixth daughter of Siemowit IV, Duke of Masovia and Alexandra, a daughter of Algirdas, Grand Duke of Lithuania and sister of King Władysław II Jagiełło of Poland.

In Poznań on 24 June 1432, Maria married Bogislaw IX, Duke of Pomerania-Wolgast-Słupsk in Stargard, the first cousin and designated heir of Eric of Pomerania, King of Denmark, Norway and Sweden. The marriage strengthened the alliance between Bogislaw IX and King Władysław II Jagiełło against the State of the Teutonic Order, who feared losing the coastal land connecting them with the Holy Roman Empire. For this, the Order tried to prevent the wedding, and Bogislaw IX had to arrive in Poznań dressed like a pilgrim.

After her husband's death on 7 December 1446, Maria became the regent of his domains until 1449, when the male heir, ex-King Eric, returned from Gotland to rule after being deposed from his three Kingdoms 10 years earlier.

Maria died on 14 February 1454. She was buried in the Chapel of Słupsk Castle. During renovations in 1788 her sarcophagus was found and burned.

== Issue ==
- Sophie of Pomerania (1435 – 24 August 1497), married Eric II, Duke of Pomerania.
- Alexandra of Pomerania (ca. 1437 – 17 October 1451), betrothed to Albrecht III Achilles, Margrave of Brandenburg in 1446.
- A daughter (d. young, ca. bef. 30 November 1449).
