= Bogislav IX =

Duke of Pomerania (1407/1410 – 1446)

Bogislav IX, Duke of Pomerania
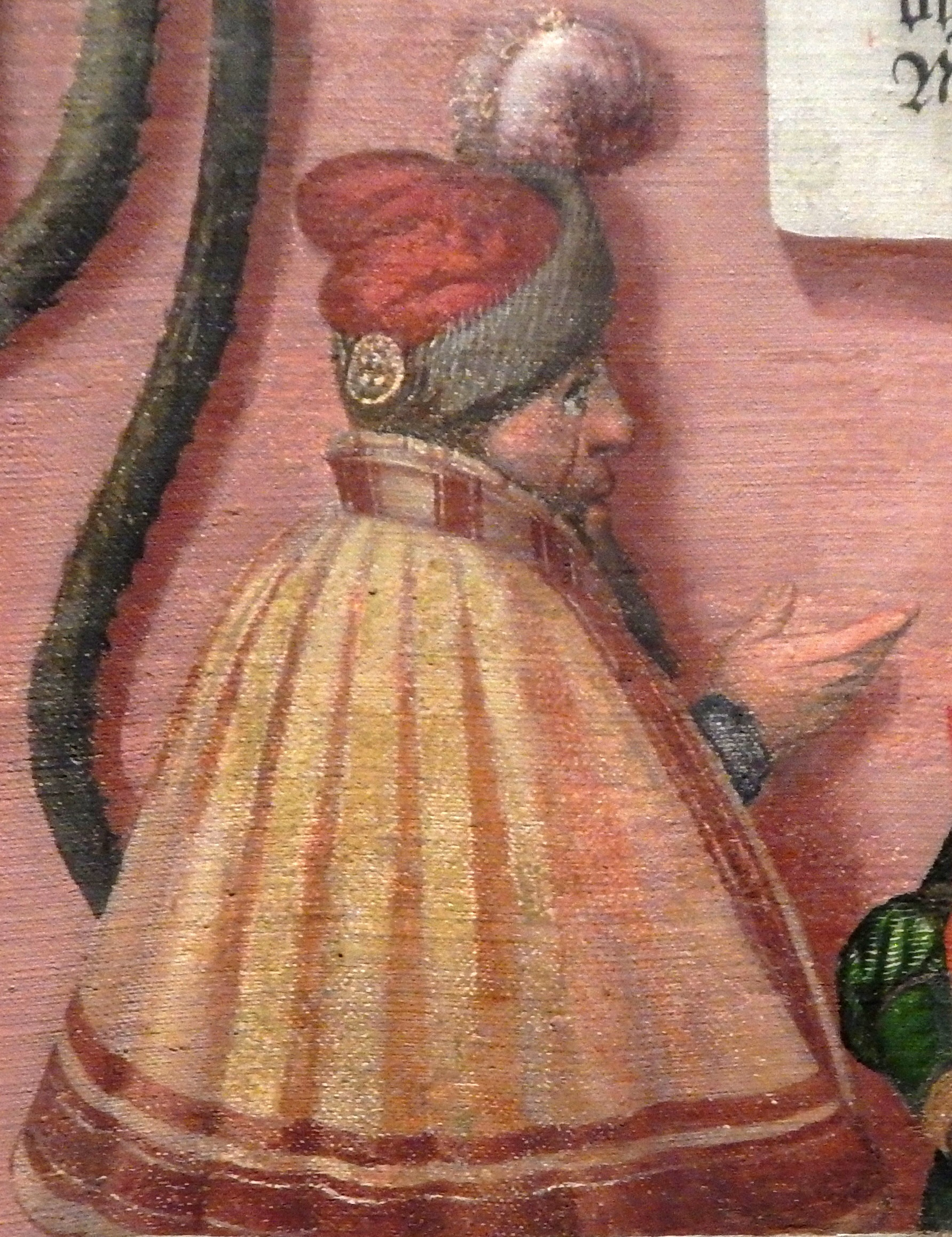
- Bogislaw IX on a family tree by Cornelius Krommeny
- Born: c. 1407–1410
- Died: 7 December 1446
- Noble family: House of Griffin
- Spouse: Maria of Masovia
- Issue: Sophie, Duchess of Pomerania
- Father: Bogislaw VIII, Duke of Pomerania
- Mother: Sophia of Holstein

Bogislav IX (German: Bogislaw IX., Polish: Bogusław IX; 1407/1410 – 7 December 1446), was a duke of Pomerania in Pomerania-Stolp, whose residence was Stargard. In 1439 his first cousin Eric of Pomerania tried in vain to have him recognised as his heir to the Kalmar Union.

Bogislav was the son of Bogislav VIII, Duke of Pomerania, and Sophia of Holstein. On 24 June 1432, in Poznan, he married Maria of Masovia, daughter of Siemowit IV, Duke of Masovia and Alexandra of Lithuania. They had daughters, Sophia, who married Eric II, Duke of Pomerania, and Alexandra, and at least one of unknown name.

During the Polish–Teutonic War (1431–1435), Bogislav opposed the Teutonic Knights and supported the Kingdom of Poland. He was later involved in struggles related to Pomeranian bishops.

Upon his death in 1446, Bogislav IX was succeeded in Pomerania-Stolp by Eric of Pomerania, who ruled as "Erik I".

== See also ==
- List of Pomeranian duchies and dukes
- Pomerania during the Late Middle Ages
- Duchy of Pomerania
- Partitions of the Duchy of Pomerania
- Pomerania-Stolp
- House of Pomerania

Bogislav IX House of Griffins Born: c. 1407-1410 Died: 7 December 1446
Preceded by Bogislaw VIII	Duke of Pomerania-Stolp; 1418–1446	Succeeded by Eric I
