= Henry VII of Brzeg =

Duke of Brzeg and ruler of Niemcza

Henry VII
- Duke of Brzeg
- Coat-of-arms of Silesian-Piasts
- Born: 1344
- Died: 11 July 1399 (aged 54–55)
- Noble family: Silesian Piasts
- Spouses: Helena of Orlamünd; Margaret of Masovia
- Issue: Henry IX; Margareta; Louis II
- Father: Louis I of Brzeg
- Mother: Agnes of Głogów-Żagań

Henry VII with a Scar also known as the Courageous or of Brzeg (Polish: Henryk VII z Blizną, Waleczny or brzeski; 1344 – 11 July 1399), was a Duke of Brzeg (Brieg) since 1361 (as co-regent of his father until 1398) and ruler of Niemcza since 1395.

He was the eldest son of Louis I the Fair, Duke of Brzeg by his wife Agnes, daughter of Henry IV of Głogów-Żagań. The death of his younger brother Wenceslaus in 1358 left him as the only male heir of his father.

In the almost contemporary "Kronice Legnickiej" Henry VII was assigned the term "z Blizną" (with a scar), which was adopted later by historians as a nickname. This term was likely the result of the wounds on his face obtained under unknown circumstances (ca. 1373), where apparently he was near to death.

== Life ==
Henry VII's first official appearance was only in 1358, and despite he being of age to assume government affairs, it wasn't until 1395 (when he was more than fifty years old!), when he received his own district, Niemcza (in fact, he had already obtained in 1382 the right to buy this district from the King Wenceslaus IV, but the formal purchase was made only ten years later, in 1392). The reason for this decision was the policy of Louis I the Fair, who didn't want to make further divisions of the already small Duchy of Brzeg. Instead, since 1360 or 1361 Henry VII was named by his father as co-regent, but without any formal power. He didn't make any protests to his father or claim a separated land for himself, a fact which was very unusual, if other Piast Duchies are considered.

In 1365 Henry VII, together with his cousin Rupert I took part in the expedition of Emperor Charles IV to Provence, during which he visited, among others, the city of Avignon, where he tried to obtain a Prebendary from his family.

Louis I the Fair died on 6/23 December 1398 and Henry VII finally received the long-awaited Duchy of Brzeg as a sole ruler. However, he died unexpectedly eight months later, on 11 July 1399.

== Marriages and Issue ==
By 1369, Henry VII married firstly Helena (d. 19 June 1369), daughter of Otto V, Count of Orlamünde. They had one son:

1. Henry IX (b. 1369 - d. 9 January 1419/10 July 1420).

In July 1379, Henry VII married secondly Margareta (b. bef. 1358 - d. ca. 14 May 1388), daughter of Siemowit III, Duke of Masovia and widow of Casimir IV, Duke of Pomerania. They had two children:

1. Margareta (b. 1380/84 - d. aft. 2 October 1408); she was betrothed to Sigismund of Luxemburg, King of Bohemia, Hungary and later Holy Roman Emperor, but the wedding never took place.
2. Louis II (b. 1380/85 - d. 30 May 1436).

Preceded by Louis I the Fair	Duke of Brzeg with Louis I (until 1398); 1361–1399	Succeeded by Henry IX and Louis II
