= Bogislaw VI =

Bogislaw VI, Duke of Pomerania
- Born: c. 1350
- Died: 7 March 1393
- Noble family: House of Griffin
- Spouses: Jutta of Saxe-Lauenburg; Agnes of Brunswick-Lüneburg
- Father: Barnim IV, Duke of Pomerania
- Mother: Sophie of Werle

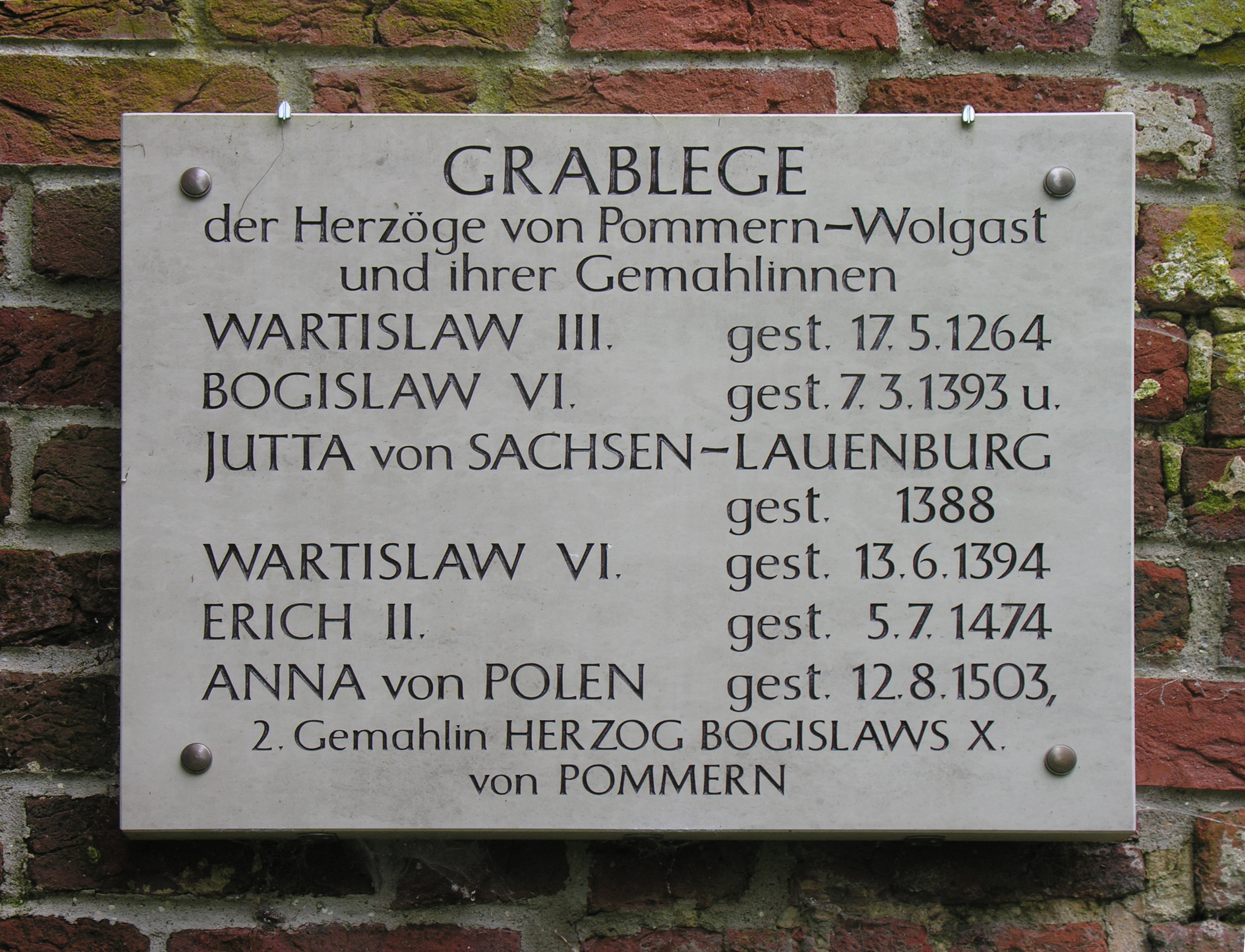
Plaque in Eldena, marking the family grave

Bogislaw VI, Duke of Pomerania (c. 1350 – 7 March 1393) was duke of Pomerania-Wolgast.

In 1365, after the death of his father, Barnim IV, he ruled Pomerania jointly with his brother Wartislaw VI. As they were both minors, they stood under the guardianship of their uncle Bogislaw V, who died in 1374. After some disputes, Pomerania was divided for a three-year period by a treaty signed on 25 May 1368 in Anklam. Bogislaw V received the area east of the Swine river, and the brothers received the area west of the Swine.

Around this time the brothers began raiding the territory of Albert of Sweden. This lasted until Wartislav VI and some of his knights were captured at Damgarten on 10 November 1368. Bogislaw Vi had to pay 1300 Marks to buy his brother free.

Shortly before his death in 1390, Bogislaw founded the village of Ahrenshoop as a port on the Loop and secured it with a castle. However, the settlement was destroyed in 1395 by troops from Rostock, and the harbor filled in.

Bogislaw died in 1393. Since he had no male offspring, his inheritance passed to his brother.

== Marriage and issue ==
Bogislaw VI's first marriage was with Jutta of Saxe-Lauenburg, a daughter of Duke Eric II of Saxe-Lauenburg. Duchess Jutta died in 1388; the marriage remained childless.

In 1389, Bogislaw VI married his second wife, Agnes of Brunswick-Lüneburg, daughter of Duke Magnus II of Brunswick-Lüneburg. Duke Bogislaw and Agnes had two daughters:

- Agnes, who was engaged to be married with Balthasar of Werle, but they probably never actually married
- Sophia (died: c. 1408), who married firstly Duke Eric I of Mecklenburg (d. 1397) and secondly Nicholas V of Werle.

After Bogislaw's death, his widow Agnes married in 1396 Duke Albert III of Mecklenburg-Schwerin.

== See also ==
- List of Pomeranian duchies and dukes

== References and sources ==
- Adolf Häckermann (1876). "Bogislav VI. (VII.) und Wartislav VI." . Allgemeine Deutsche Biographie (in German). Vol. 3. Leipzig: Duncker & Humblot. pp. 46–47.
- Martin Wehrmann: Genealogie des pommerschen Herzogshauses, in: Veröffentlichungen der landesgeschichtlichen Forschungsstelle für Pommern, series 1, vol. 5, Leon Saunier, Stettin, 1937, pp. 88–89, 96–97.
