= Świętobor, Duke of Pomerania =

Świętobor (Latin: Suatobor) was a Pomeranian duke of 11th and 12th century. According to Gesta principum Polonorum of the chronicler Gallus Anonymus, he was a relative of king of Poland, Bolesław III Wrymouth. In one particular instance, Świętobor was imprisoned by his rivals and Bolesław set out with military aid for Świętobór. However, before Bolesław's expedition reached its destination, Świętobór was freed and the king's forces turned around and returned home.

As historical sources do not mention anything else about him, remaining information on Świętobór consists of speculation. Historians assume that he was a ruler of part of Western Pomerania and a descendant of Siemomysł of Pomerania and a relative of Świętopełk, Duke of Pomerania. Modern historians assume that Siemomysł was a descendant of Świętopełk Mieszkowic or Mieszko Mieszkowic.
