= Siemomysł, Duke of Pomerania =

Duke of Pomerania

Siemomysł, Siemosił, or Zemuzil (fl. 11th century) was the first historically verifiable Duke of Pomerania, recorded in 1046 in the Annals of Niederaltaich (Annales Altahensis maiorum).

== Historical record ==
The Annals record reads: "His omnibus peractis rex inde discessit ac Mersiburc, natale sancti Iohannis celebraturus [24 June], perrexit. Illuc etiam Bratizlao dux Boemorum, Kazmir Bolaniorum, Zemuzil Bomeraniorum advenerunt atque regem donis decentibus honoraverunt. [...] Inde discedens apostolorum Petri et Pauli festa [29 June] Mihsina celebravit ubi etiam conventionem secundo habens duces praefatos inter se pacificavit." (Annales Altahensis maiorum ad a. 1046)

This entry describes Zemuzil's attendance of a meeting with Henry III, Holy Roman Emperor in Merseburg ("Mersiburc") on 24 June 1046, along with Bretislaus I, Duke of Bohemia ("Bratizlao dux Boemorum") and Casimir I of Poland ("Kazmir Bolaniorum"). The dukes "honored the emperor with decent gifts", which according to Schmidt (2009) was the payment of tribute. In a second meeting on 29 June in Meißen ("Mihsin"), according to the document, the "aforementioned dukes" concluded a mutual peace agreement.

== Scholarly assessment ==
=== Nature of the dispute ===
Roderich Schmidt (2009) assumes that the peace referenced in the document was necessary, among other reasons, because of fights between Zemuzil and Casimir, and that Zemuzil aided Miecław of Mazovia who had fought against Casimir, previously expelled from Poland but restored with Henry's aid, and was defeated. According to Edward Rymar (2005) the most likely nature of the dispute was the non payment of tribute by the Pomeranian duke to Casimir. After Henry's intermediation Zemuzil failed to pay feudal dues and Casimir invaded and took control of Pomerania in the following year (1047).

=== Žemužilse's realm ===
According to Schmidt it is not possible on the basis of the 1046 record to decide the location of his realm. Edward Rymar, following Łowmiański, believes that Žemužilis was a ruler of a unified Pomeranian state with its center in Kołobrzeg (Kolberg) rather than a smaller duchy, which explains why he was treated by Henry as a co-equal with the rulers of Bohemia and Poland. Schmidt also argues that the mention of Žemužilis along with Bretislaus and Casimir suggest that they were equal in status, and that the political organisation of his realm in 1046 resembled the Bohemian and Polish ones.

On the other hand, Stabenow (1995) says that the great majority of historians regard Zemuzil as ruler of only a part of the area between Oder, Baltic Sea, Vistula, Warta and Noteć, and that the location of his realm within this area is disputed. Stabenow further says that the 1046 entry constitutes the first written record of the Baltic Pomeranians.

=== Name ===
Historians have made several attempts to reconstruct the duke's Slavic name from the version recorded by a German chronicler, "Žemužils". Before the connection between the document from 1040 and the one from 1046 was made the name was variously rendered as Ziemomysł (by Oswald Balcer), Siemosił (by Aleksander Brückner) and even Wszemysł (this particular variant has been abandoned as a hypothesis). Zygmunt Wojciechowski in consultation with Slavicists considered "Žemužilis" to correspond to the diminutive form "Siemysł", short for "Siemomysł". The name appears among the members of the Piast dynasty with the Polish duke Siemomysł and the stem "-Siem", referring to "family" (hence "Siemomysł" is someone "thoughtful of their family"), is also found in the Piast name of the half-legendary Siemowit.

=== Religion ===
According to Rymar, Zemuzil was most likely a Christian or otherwise he would not have had Henry's support, although he might have kept this fact hidden from his still mostly pagan subjects.

=== Proposed genealogies ===
According to Edward Rymar, Zemuzil is often thought to have been the father or the grand father of the Pomeranian Duke Świętobor I. Schmidt says it is not possible on the basis of the 1046 record to decide whether Zemuzil was an ancestor of later Pomeranian dukes, and cites similar conclusions of other German historians Martin Wehrmann and Adolf Hofmeister.

The 19th century German historian Johann Ludwig Quandt believed that Zemuzil and other early Pomeranian dukes of the Griffin dynasty descended from Polish nobility of Lesser Poland, that Zemuzil was made a voivode of his duchy by the Polish king Bolesław I Chrobry, and that he was the grand father of Świętobor I. The Austro-Polish historian Oswald Balzer linked the duke with the Piast dynasty through a matrilineal connection, making his mother the daughter of Bolesław I Chrobry. In a similar way, Henryk Łowmiański saw Zemuzil as the son of a daughter of Mieszko I, the first historical ruler of Poland.

Gerard Labuda said that Zemuzil was most likely related to the Piasts through his mother. Rymar says that the 1040 document is one of the reasons why Zemuzil is sometimes thought to be related to the Polish Piast dynasty. Stanisław Zakrzewski believed the duke to be a brother of the Dytryk proposed as the father of Sememizl by Labuda, and also hypothesized that Zemuzil was an ancestor of Świętobor.

=== Sememizl ===
A document from 1040 mentions a Sememizl. This document is a record of Henry III bestowing upon the cathedral in Naumburg few villages which Sememizl previously held as fiefs from Henry III. According to Edward Rymar, Sememizl is generally identified with Zemuzil due to rarity of this name among Polish Piasts and Pomeranian dukes. Gerard Labuda doubted a connection between Zemuzil and Sememizl, whom he thought to be a son of Dytryk, one of the step brothers of Chrobry who had been banished by the Polish king to Germany.
