= Elizabeth of Poland, Duchess of Pomerania =

Duchess consort of Pomerania (1326–1361)

Elisabeth of Poland
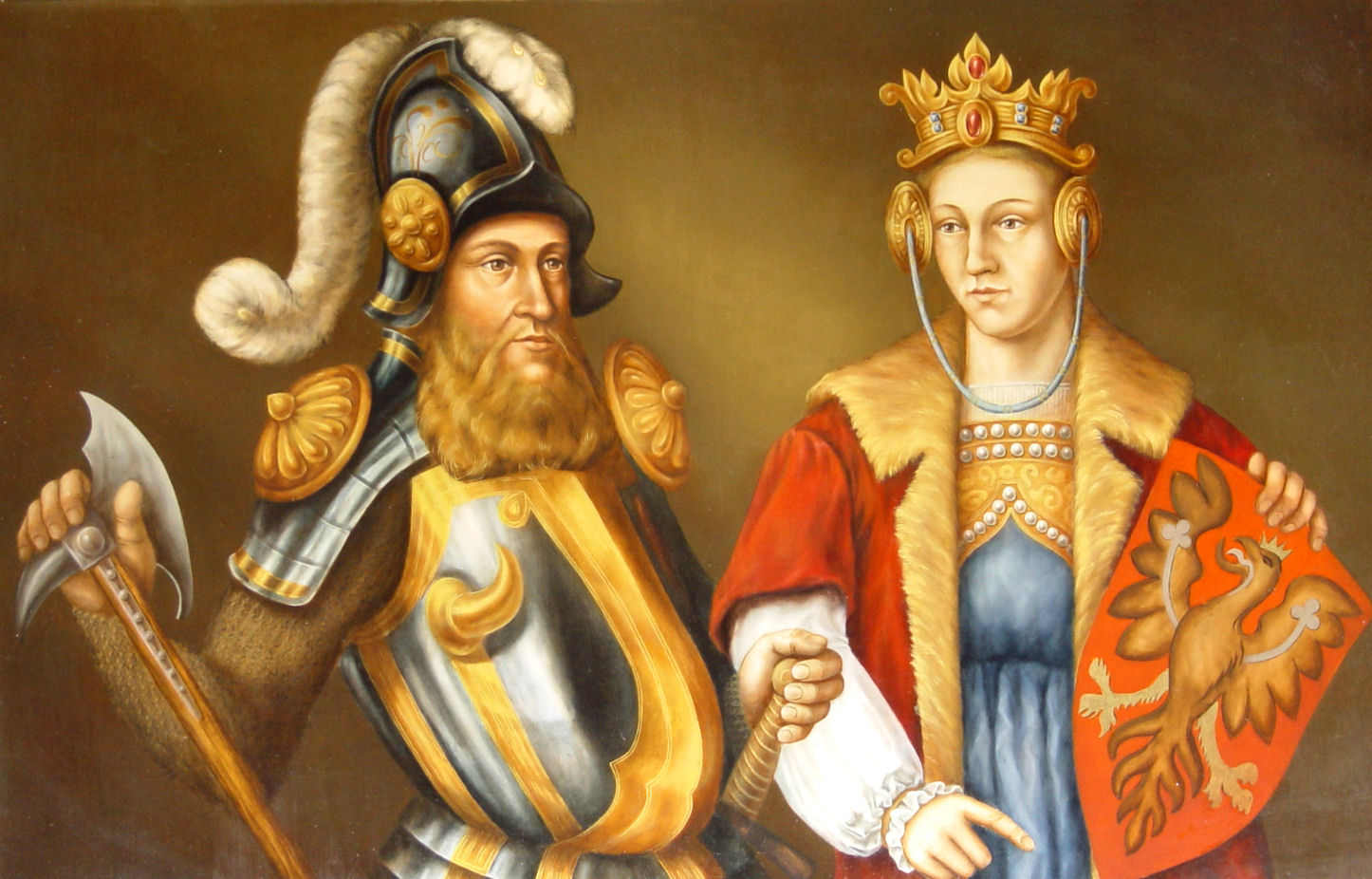
- Elisabeth and her husband

Duchess consort of Pomerania
- Tenure: 1343–1361
- Born: 1326
- Died: 1361 (aged 34–35)
- Spouse: Bogislaw V, Duke of Pomerania
- Issue: Elizabeth, Holy Roman Empress; Casimir IV, Duke of Pomerania
- House: House of Piast (by birth); House of Pomerania (by marriage)
- Father: Casimir III of Poland
- Mother: Aldona of Lithuania

Princess Elisabeth of Poland (Polish: Elżbieta Kazimierzówna; 1326–1361) was the eldest child of Casimir III of Poland and his first wife, Aldona of Lithuania.

== Marriage ==
Elizabeth was originally betrothed to her future brother-in-law, Louis VI the Roman. She was eventually passed over for her younger sister, Cunigunde.

An agreement, directed primarily against the Teutonic Order, was reached on 24 February 1343 in Poznań between Elizabeth's father and Bogislaw V, Duke of Pomerania. As a result, Elizabeth married Bogislaw on 28 February 1343. She received a dowry from her father of 20,000 kop (cents in Prague) and mainly lived in the Castle of Darlowo during her marriage. The couple had two children:

- Elizabeth of Pomerania (1347 – 15 April 1393), wife of Charles IV, Holy Roman Emperor
- Casimir IV of Pomerania (c. 1351 – 2 January 1377)

Her daughter Elizabeth was married in 1363 to the Holy Roman Emperor Charles IV. The marriage took place during the Congress of Kraków; the most celebrated feast commemorating the event took place at the house of Mikołaj Wierzynek (młodszy). Elizabeth of Poland did not live to see her daughter married off. She died in 1361 at a monastery of the Order of Saint Augustine in Świątkach, and was buried there.

Her son, Casimir (Kaźko) was groomed to become Casimir the Great's successor as King of Poland but was sidelined by Louis I of Hungary, and instead succeeded Bogislaw in 1364 as Duke of Pomerania.

== Sources ==
- Davies, Norman (1982). God's Playground: A History of Poland. Vol. I: The Origins to 1795. Columbia University Press.
- Frost, Robert I. (2015). The Making of the Polish-Lithuanian Union 1385-1569. Vol. 1. Oxford University Press.
- Lerski, George J. (1996). "Kazimierz IV". Historical Dictionary of Poland, 966-1945. ABC-CLIO.
