= Bogislaw V of Pomerania =

Bogislaw V
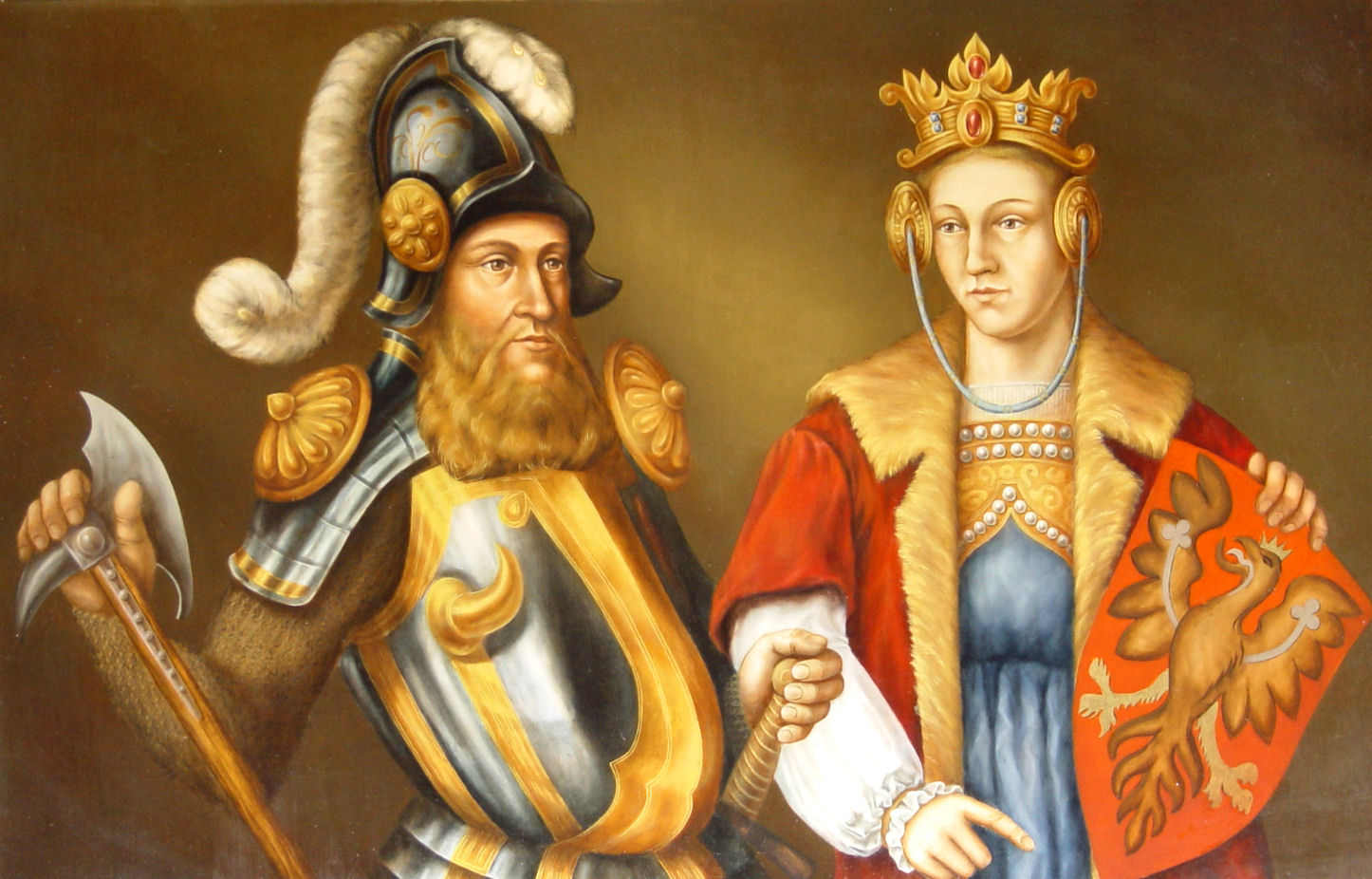

Duke of Pomerania-Wolgast
- Reign: 1 August 1326 – 23 April 1374
- Predecessor: Wartislaw IV
- Successor: Casimir IV

Duke of Pomerania-Stolp
- Reign: 1368 – 23 April 1374
- Successor: Casimir IV

Prince of Rügen
- Reign: 1 August 1326 – 23 April 1374
- Predecessor: Wartislaw IV
- Successor: Bogislaw VI; Wartislaw VI
- Born: c. 1318; Slupsk
- Died: 23 April 1374 (c. 55-56); Belbuck Monastery
- Spouse: Elisabeth Piast; Adelheid of Brunswick-Grubenhagen
- Issue: Elizabeth, Empress of the Holy Roman Empire; Casimir IV of Pomerania; Wartislaw VII of Pomerania; Bogislaw VIII of Pomerania; Barnim V of Pomerania; Margaret of Pomerania
Names
- German: Bogislaw V von Pommern; Polish: Bogusław V pomorski
- House: House of Griffin
- Father: Wartislaw IV, Duke of Pomerania
- Mother: Elisabeth of Lindow-Ruppin

Bogislaw V (Polish: Bogusław, Latin: Bogislaus) (c. 1318 – 23 April 1374), sometimes known as the Great (Polish: Bogusław V Wielki), was a Duke of Pomerania.

Eldest son of Duke Wartislaw IV and Elisabeth of Lindow-Ruppin, Bogislaw had two brothers, Barnim IV and Wartislaw V. The brothers were joint rulers from their father's death in 1326. They allied with King Casimir III of Poland, whose daughter Elisabeth married Bogislaw, against the Teutonic Order. Elisabeth died in 1361; in 1362 Bogislaw married Adelheid Welf, daughter of Ernest I, Duke of Brunswick-Grubenhagen.

The death of Barnim in 1366 led to a quarrel between Bogislaw and Wartislaw, which was settled by a treaty in 1368 partitioning Pomerania between Bogislaw V, Wartislaw V, and Barnim's sons, Bogislaw VI and Wartislaw VI. Bogislaw received most of the Farther Pomeranian parts of Pomerania-Wolgast, thence Pomerania-Stolp (named after the town of Stolp, now Słupsk). Wartislaw received the Neustettin (now Szczecinek) area, and the sons of Barnim received North-Western Pomerania with Rügen and Usedom.

Bogislaw's daughter Elisabeth married the Holy Roman Emperor Charles IV, King of Bohemia in 1363 and he concluded an alliance with his son-in-law in 1370.

== Marriages and children ==
On 28 February 1343, Bogislaw married his first wife Elisabeth of Poland. She was a daughter of Casimir III of Poland and his first wife Aldona of Lithuania. They had two children:

- Elizabeth of Pomerania (1347 – 15 April 1393). She married Charles IV, Holy Roman Emperor.
- Casimir IV of Pomerania (c. 1351 – 2 January 1377).

Elisabeth died in 1361. In 1362, Bogislaw V married his second wife Adelheid of Brunswick-Grubenhagen. She was a daughter of Ernest I, Duke of Brunswick-Grubenhagen and Adelheid of Everstein. They had four children:

- Wartislaw VII of Pomerania (d. 24 February 1395). Father of Eric of Pomerania.
- Bogislaw VIII of Pomerania (c. 1363 – 11 February 1418).
- Barnim V of Pomerania (1369 – 16 May 1402).
- Margaret of Pomerania (1366 – 1407/1410). Married Ernest, Duke of Austria.

== See also ==
- List of Pomeranian duchies and dukes
- Pomerania during the Late Middle Ages
- Duchy of Pomerania
- Partitions of the Duchy of Pomerania
- Pomerania-Stolp
- House of Pomerania

== Sources ==
- Frost, Robert I. (2015). The Making of the Polish-Lithuanian Union 1385-1569. Vol. 1. Oxford University Press.
- Lerski, George J. (1996). "Kazimierz IV". Historical Dictionary of Poland, 966-1945. ABC-CLIO.
- Loud, Graham A.; Schenk, Jochen, eds. (2017). The Origins of the German Principalities, 1100-1350: Essays by German Historians. Routledge.

Bogislaw V of Pomerania House of Griffins Born: c. 1318 Died: 23 April 1374
Preceded by Wartislaw IV	Duke of Pomerania-Wolgast; 1326–1368	Pomerania-Wolgast subdivided
New division	Duke of Pomerania-Stolp; 1368–1374	Succeeded by Casimir IV
