= Barnim IV =

Barnim IV of Pomerania
- Born: 1325
- Died: 22 August 1365 (aged 39–40)
- Noble family: House of Griffin
- Spouse: Sophie of Werle
- Issue: Wartislaw VI; Bogislaw VI; Elisabeth
- Father: Wartislaw IV, Duke of Pomerania
- Mother: Elisabeth of Lindow-Ruppin

Barnim IV of Pomerania (1325 – 22 August 1365) was a Duke of Pomerania-Wolgast-Rügen.

== Life ==
He was the second son of Duke Wartislaw IV of Pomerania-Wolgast and the brother of Bogislaw V and Wartislaw V.

He married Sophie of Werle (1329–1364), the daughter of John II of Werle. They had two sons, Wartislaw VI and Bogislaw VI, and a daughter, Elisabeth, who married Duke Magnus I of Mecklenburg.

He inherited Pomerania-Wolgast-Rügen when his father died in 1326. He was one year old at the time. He shared a guardian with his brother Bogislaw V, Duke of Pomerania-Wolgast-Rügen.

Emperor Charles IV granted Barnim IV Imperial immediacy in 1348.

== Ancestors ==
Ancestors of Barnim IV

8. Barnim I, Duke of Pomerania
4. Bogislaw IV, Duke of Pomerania
9. Margaret of Adenoys
2. Wartislaw IV, Duke of Pomerania
10. Vitslav II, Prince of Rügen
5. Margaret of Rugia
11. Agnes of Brunswick-Lüneburg
1. Barnim IV, Duke of Pomerania
12. Günther I of Londow-Ruppin
6. Ulrich I, Count of Lindow-Ruppin
13. Euphemia of Rugia
3. Elisabeth of Lindow-Ruppin
14. Meinhard of Schladen
7. Adelaide of Schladen
15. Adelaide of Werberg

Barnim IV House of Griffins Born: 1325 Died: 22 August 1365
Preceded by Wartislaw IV	Duke of Pomerania-Wolgast; 1326–1365	Succeeded by Wartislaw VI
