= Elisabeth of Lindow-Ruppin =

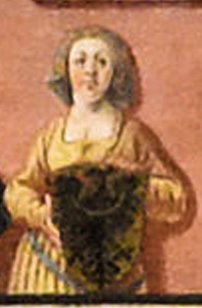

Elisabeth of Lindow-Ruppin (died 1356), was a Duchess consort of Pomerania by marriage to Wartislaw IV, Duke of Pomerania.

She was the regent of Pomerania in 1326–1330 during the minority of her children, Bogislaw V, Duke of Pomerania, Barnim IV, Duke of Pomerania and Wartislaw V, Duke of Pomerania.
