= Wartislaw IV =

Duke of Pomerania-Wolgast from 1309 until his death

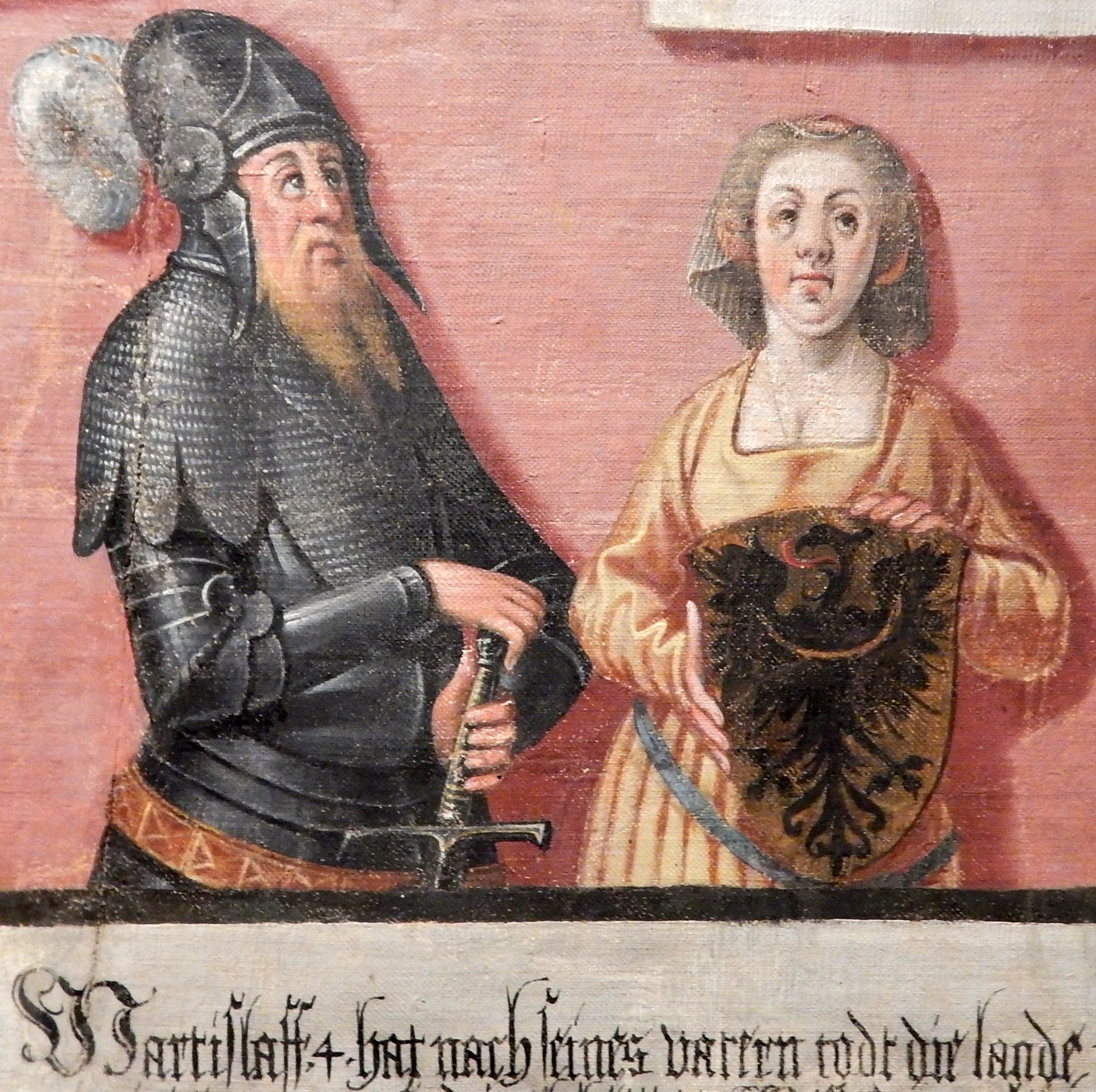

Duke of Pomerania-Wolgast
- Reign: February 1309 – 1 August 1326
- Predecessor: Bogislaw IV
- Successor: Bogislaw V Wartislaw V Barnim IV

Prince of Rügen
- Reign: 1325 – 1 August 1326
- Predecessor: Vitslav III
- Successor: Bogislaw V Wartislaw V Barnim IV
- Born: before 1290
- Died: 1 August 1326; Stralsund
- Spouse: Elisabeth of Lindow-Ruppin
- Issue: Bogislaw V Barnim IV; Wartislaw V
Names
- German: Wartislaw IV von Pommern
- House: House of Griffin
- Father: Bogislaw IV, Duke of Pomerania
- Mother: Margareta of Rügen

Wartislaw IV or Vartislav IV (before 1290 – 1 August 1326) was Duke of Pomerania-Wolgast from 1309 until his death. He was the only son of Duke Bogislaw IV of Pomerania and his wife Margareta, a daughter of Vitslav II, Prince of Rügen. Vartislaw IV had four sisters: Jutta, Elisabeth, Margareta and Eufemia.

Vartislaw IV married Elisabeth, a daughter of Count Ulrich I of Lindow-Ruppin; they had three sons: Bogislav V, Barnim IV and Vartislaw V.

In 1309 Vartislav IV succeeded his father as duke of Pomerania-Wolgast and in 1317 received the Lands of Schlawe and Stolp as a fief from Margrave Waldemar of Brandenburg-Stendal. Upon Valdemar's death in 1319, his minor cousin and heir Henry II was under Vartislav's tutelage, his plans to achieve the rule over Brandenburg however were shattered by King Louis IV of Germany, who finally granted the margraviate to his son Louis V of Wittelsbach in 1323.

In 1321 Vartislav signed an inheritance treaty with his maternal uncle Prince Wizlaw III of Rugia, and upon his death in 1325 oversaw the unification with the Principality of Rügen, then a Danish fief. King Christopher II of Denmark however, despite his former assertions, enfeoffed the Mecklenburg and Werle princes, thereby sparking a war of succession, in which late Vartislav's minor sons, backed by King Christopher's opponent Count Gerhard III of Holstein and Duke Barnim III of Pomerania-Stettin had to struggle for their heritage, until Mecklenburg renounced Rugia in 1328.

Wartislaw IV House of Pomerania Died: 1 August 1326
Preceded by Bogislaw IV	Duke of Pomerania-Wolgast; 1309–1326	Succeeded by Bogislaw V
Preceded by Vitslav III	Prince of Rügen; 1325–1326	Succeeded by Bogislaw V
