= Casimir IV of Pomerania =

Casimir IV, Duke of Pomerania
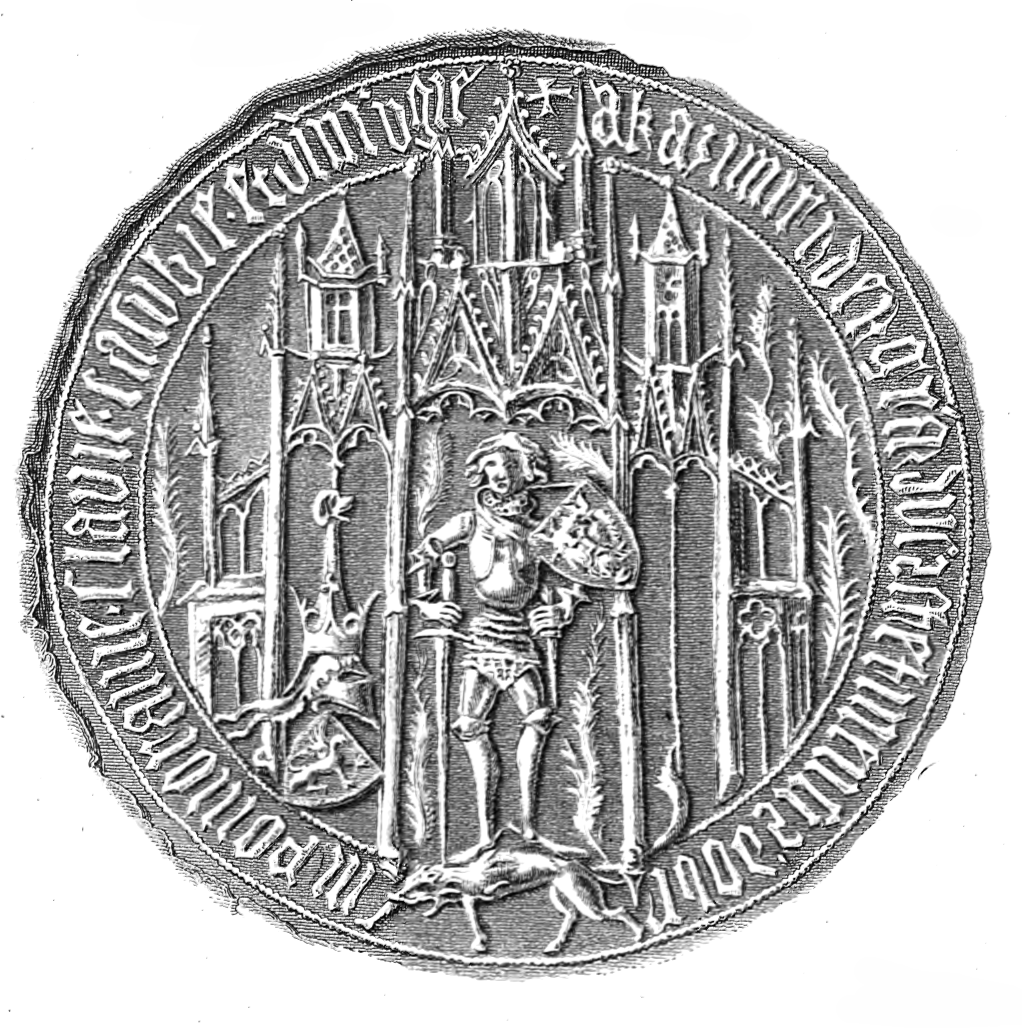
- Seal of Casimir, reading "Kasimir, Dei Gra(tia) Dux Stetinensis, Dobrin, Pomoranie, Slavie, Casubie, Pr(inceps) in Rugie"
- Born: 1351
- Died: 2 January 1377
- Noble family: House of Griffin
- Spouses: Kenna of Lithuania; Margaret of Masovia
- Father: Bogislaw V, Duke of Pomerania
- Mother: Elizabeth of Poland

Casimir IV (Polish: Kazimierz IV or Kaźko Słupski, German: Kasimir IV or Kasimir V; 1351 – 2 January 1377) was a duke of Pomerania in Pomerania-Stolp since 1374.

== Life ==
Casimir was the son of Bogislaw V, Duke of Pomerania and Elizabeth of Poland. His maternal grandfather Casimir III the Great, the last king of Poland from the Piast dynasty, had no sons and brought him up at his court. After his grandfather's death in 1370, young Casimir initially became his partial successor, as the last will gave him lands of Dobrzyń, Bydgoszcz, Kruszwica, Złotów and Wałcz as fiefs. Yet, his ambitions were soon thwarted by Louis I of Hungary, who became the next king of Poland on the grounds of earlier pacts, and nullified the Piast's last will. Duke Casimir only held the land of Dobrzyń as a temporary fief.

In 1360, Casimir married his first wife Kenna of Lithuania. She was the daughter of Algirdas and Uliana Alexandrovna of Tver, raised in the Eastern Orthodox faith. With her marriage, she joined the Roman Catholic Church and was baptised again under the name "Johanna". She died on 27 April 1368, leaving no children.

After a year, Casimir IV married his second wife Margaret of Masovia. She was the daughter of Siemowit III of Masovia and his first wife Euphemia of Opava. They had no children. After Casimir's death of wounds (received in fighting Władysław the White on behalf of King Louis), she married Henry VII, Duke of Lubin and Brzeg.

Although after the death of his father Bogislaw V in 1374 Casimir IV stayed several times in Pomerania-Stolp, most of the time he spent in Bydgoszcz; with his death in 1377 his fiefs fell back to Poland.

== See also ==
- List of Pomeranian duchies and dukes
- Pomerania during the Late Middle Ages
- Duchy of Pomerania
  - Partitions of the Duchy of Pomerania
    - Pomerania-Stolp
- House of Pomerania

== Sources ==
- Braning, Hans (1987). Geschichte Pommerns (in German). Vol. I. Böhlau.
- Buchholz, Werner (1999). Pommern (in German). Siedler.
- Boockmann, Hartmut (1992). Die Anfänge der ständischen Vertretungen in Preussen und seinen Nachbarländern (in German). Oldenbourg Wissenschaftsverlag. ISBN 9783486558401.
- Lerski, George J. (1996). "Kazimierz IV". Historical Dictionary of Poland, 966-1945. ABC-CLIO.
- Rowell, Stephen Christopher (1994). Lithuania Ascending: A Pagan Empire Within East-Central Europe, 1295-1345. Cambridge University Press.
- Wehrmann, Martin (1904). Geschichte von Pommern (in German). Verlag Friedrich Andreas Perthes.

Casimir IV of Pomerania House of Griffins Born: 1351 Died: 2 January 1377
Preceded by Bogislaw V	Duke of Pomerania-Stolp; 1374–1377	Succeeded by Wartislaw VII
