= Maurice, Duke of Saxe-Lauenburg =

Maurice

Duke of Saxe-Lauenburg
- Reign: 1581 – 1612
- Predecessor: Francis I
- Successor: Francis II
- Co-rulers: Magnus II; Francis II)
- Born: 1551
- Died: 2 November 1612 (aged 60–61); Buxtehude
- Consort: Catherine of Spörck
- Issue more...: Moritz Rautenstein (illegitimate); Julius Ernst Rautenstein (illegitimate)
- House: Ascania
- Father: Francis I of Saxe-Lauenburg
- Mother: Sybille of Saxe-Freiberg
- Religion: Lutheran

Maurice of Saxe-Lauenburg (1551 – 2 November 1612, Buxtehude) was the fourth son of Francis I of Saxe-Lauenburg and Sybille of Saxe-Freiberg (Freiberg, *2 May 1515 – 18 July 1592*, Buxtehude), daughter of Duke Henry IV the Pious of Saxony. Maurice ruled Saxe-Lauenburg as duke between 1581 and 1612, together with his elder brothers Magnus II (until 1588) and Francis II, who survived him.

== Life ==
When in 1571 their father Francis I resigned in favour of his then major sons Magnus II and Francis II, Magnus violently tried to repress his younger brother Francis II, however, failing in the end in 1574. Francis I then reascended the throne.

After their father's death in 1581 the then major Maurice and his elder brothers Magnus II and Francis II jointly ruled as dukes in Saxe-Lauenburg. However, in 1588 Francis II and Maurice imprisoned Magnus II in Ratzeburg's castle for his repeated atrocities and continued their joint rule without him.

In 1585 (or 1586) Maurice moved to Buxtehude, then a city in the Prince-Archbishopric of Bremen ruled by his brother Prince-Archbishop Henry of Saxe-Lauenburg, and resided in Buxtehude in the Abtshaus (Abbot's house) of the nunnery of Altkloster (now a component of Buxtehude). In 1588 his mother played a prominent role in his affair with Gisela von Tschammer, against whom she initiated a trial witchcraft. As duke Maurice remained passive and lived in the abbot's house until his death. The abbot's house now serves as a gallery and café. His mother Sibylle died in Buxtehude in 1592.

== Marriage and issue ==
In 1581 Maurice married Katharina von Spörck; however, they divorced the following year. They had no children.

With his mistress Gisela of Saxony (married with Adam von Tschammer) Duke Maurice had two illegitimate sons:

- Moritz Rautenstein (*? – 1617/39*)
- Julius Ernst Rautenstein (*ca. 1590 – ca. 1660*)

== Ancestry ==
Ancestors of Maurice, Duke of Saxe-Lauenburg

16. Bernard II, Duke of Saxe-Lauenburg
8. John V, Duke of Saxe-Lauenburg
17. Adelheid of Pomerania-Stolp
4. Magnus I, Duke of Saxe-Lauenburg
18. Frederick II Irontooth, Elector of Brandenburg
9. Dorothea of Brandenburg
19. Catherine of Saxony
2. Francis I, Duke of Saxe-Lauenburg
20. William IV, Duke of Brunswick and Lunenburg (Wolfenbüttel)
10. Henry IV, Duke of Brunswick and Lunenburg (Wolfenbüttel)
21. Elisabeth of Stolberg-Wernigerode
5. Catherine of Brunswick-Wolfenbüttel
22. Eric II, Duke of Pomerania-Wolgast (=#30)
11. Catherine of Pomerania-Wolgast
23. Sophia of Pomerania-Stolp (=#31)
1. Maurice, Duke of Saxe-Lauenburg
24. Frederick II the Gentle, Elector of Saxony
12. Albert, Duke of Saxony
25. Margarete of Austria
6. Henry IV the Pious, Duke of Saxony
26. George of Poděbrady
13. Sidonie Podiebrad
27. Kunigunde of Sternberg
3. Sybille of Saxe-Freiberg
28. Henry IV the Fat, Duke of Mecklenburg-Schwerin
14. Magnus II, Duke of Mecklenburg-Schwerin
29. Dorothea of Brandenburg
7. Catherine of Mecklenburg-Schwerin
30. Eric II, Duke of Pomerania-Wolgast (=#22)
15. Sophia of Pomerania-Wolgast
31. Sophia of Pomerania-Stolp (=#23)

== Succession box ==
Maurice, Duke of Saxe-Lauenburg House of Ascania Born: 1551 Died: 2 November 1612 in Buxtehude
Regnal titles
Preceded by Francis I	Dukes of Saxe-Lauenburg; 1581 – 1612 with his brother Francis II (1578 – 1619)	Succeeded by Francis II
