= Francis I of Saxe-Lauenburg =

Francis I

Duke of Saxe-Lauenburg
- Reign: 1543 – 1571
- Predecessor: Magnus I
- Successor: Magnus II

Duke of Saxe-Lauenburg
- Reign: 1573 – 1581
- Predecessor: Magnus II
- Successors: Francis II and Maurice (joint rule)
- Born: 1510
- Died: 19 March 1581 (aged 70–71); Buxtehude
- Consort: Sibylle of Saxony
- Issue more...: Magnus II; Francis II; Henry; Maurice; Frederick
- House: House of Ascania
- Father: Magnus I
- Mother: Catherine of Brunswick-Wolfenbüttel
- Religion: Lutheranism

Francis I of Saxe-Lauenburg (1510 – 19 March 1581, Buxtehude) was the eldest child and only son of Duke Magnus I of Saxe-Lauenburg and Catherine of Brunswick-Wolfenbüttel (1488 – 29 July 1563, Neuhaus), daughter of Duke Henry IV the Elder of Brunswick and Lunenburg (Wolfenbüttel). He succeeded his father in 1543 as duke of Saxe-Lauenburg, but resigned in favour of his major son Magnus II in 1571. Two years later, he reascended and was succeeded by Francis II in 1581.

== Life ==
With his thriftiness Francis I deeply plunged Saxe-Lauenburg into debts, to this end he pawned most of the ducal demesnes to his creditors. In 1550 Francis I wielded his influence to make the chapter of the neighbouring Prince-Bishopric of Ratzeburg elect his 7-year-old son Magnus as coming prince-bishop, however, the capitular canons refused.

Heavily indebted and with no further need for good relations with the prince-bishopric Francis I looted Ratzeburg Cathedral in 1552. In 1558 he conquered the prince-episcopal Bridgettine Monastery of Marienwohlde near Mölln, looted and demolished the cloister, forced its vassal farmers to swear him loyalty and pay him dues, and started overfelling in the monasterial woods, selling the timber abroad.

In 1571 – highly indebted – Francis I resigned in favour of his eldest son Magnus II, who had promised to redeem the pawned ducal demesnes with funds he gained as Swedish military commander and by his marriage to a Swedish princess. However, Magnus did not redeem pawns but further alienated ducal possessions, which ignited a conflict between Magnus and his father and brothers Francis (II) and Maurice as well as the estates of the duchy, further escalating due to Magnus' violent temperament.

In 1573 Francis I deposed Magnus and reascended to the throne while Magnus fled to Sweden, the homeland of his wife Sophia Vasa of Sweden. The following year Magnus hired troops in order to take Saxe-Lauenburg with violence. Francis II, an experienced military commander in imperial service, and Duke Adolphus of Holstein-Gottorp, then Lower Saxon Circle Colonel (Kreisobrist), helped Francis I to defeat Magnus. In return Saxe-Lauenburg had to cede the bailiwick of Steinhorst to Adolphus' Holstein-Gottorp in 1575. Francis II again helped his father to inhibit Magnus' second military attempt to overthrow his father in 1578. Francis I then made Francis II his vicegerent actually governing the duchy.

In 1581 - shortly before he died and after consultations with his son Prince-Archbishop Henry of Bremen and Emperor Rudolph II, but unconcerted with his other sons Magnus and Maurice - Francis I made his third son Francis II, whom he considered the ablest, his sole successor, violating the rules of primogeniture. This severed the anyway difficult relations with the estates of the duchy, which fought the ducal practice of growing indebtedness.

== Marriage and issue ==
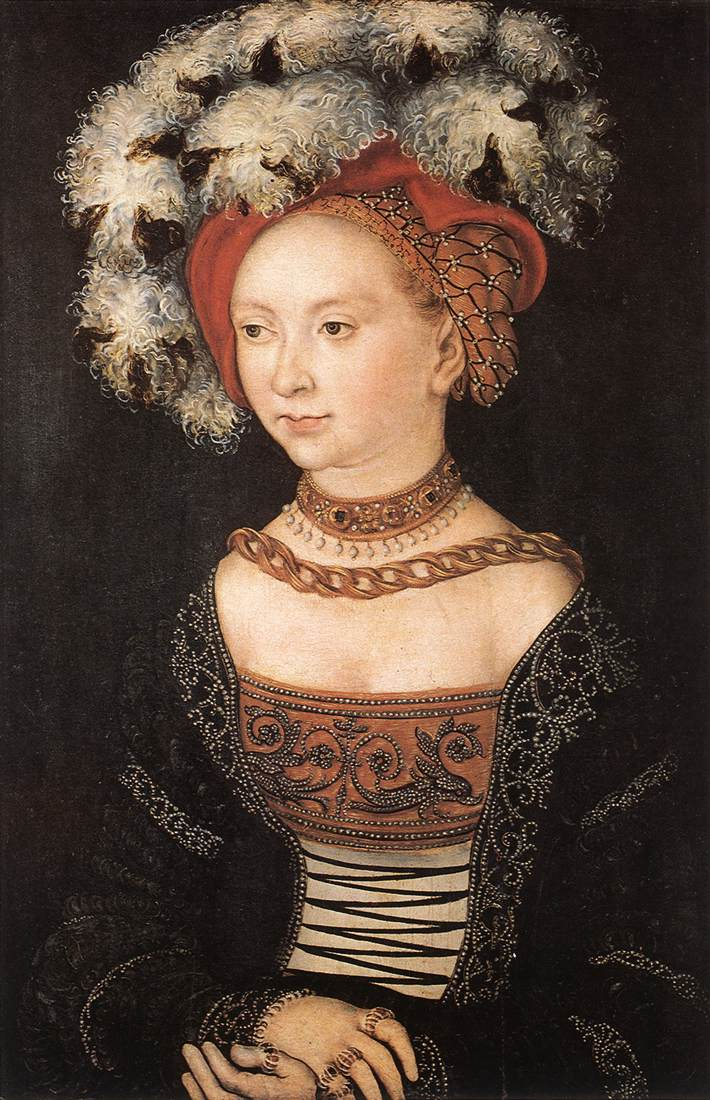
Sibylle of Saxony, ca. 1530

On 8 February 1540 Francis I married in Dresden Sibylle of Saxony (Freiberg, *2 May 1515 – 18 July 1592*, Buxtehude), daughter of Henry IV, Duke of Saxony. They had the following children:

- Albert (*1542 – 1544*)
- Dorothea (Lüneburg, *11 March 1543 – 5 April 1586*, Herzberg am Harz), ∞ Wolfgang, Duke of Brunswick-Grubenhagen (*1531 – 1595*)
- Magnus II (*1543 – 14 May 1603*, Ratzeburg)
- Ursula (*1545 – 22 October 1620*, Schernebeck), married in 1569 Henry, Duke of Brunswick-Dannenberg
- Francis II (*1547 – 1619*)
- Henry (*1 November 1550 – 22 April 1585*, Vörde), as Henry III Prince-Archbishop of Bremen (1567–1585), as well as Prince-Bishop of Osnabrück (Henry II, 1574–1585) and Paderborn (Henry I, 1577–1585), married Anna von Broich
- Maurice (*1551 – 1612*), married in 1581 Katharina von Spörck, divorced in 1582
- Sidonia Catharina (*?– 1594*), married in 1567 (1) Wenceslaus III Adam, Duke of Cieszyn and in 1586 (2) Emmerich III Forgach, Upper Gespan of the Duchy of Teschen
- Frederick (*1554 – 1586*, Cologne), canon at the Cologne and Bremen Cathedrals

Illegitimate children with Else Rautenstein were:

- Franz Rautenstein (*? – after 26 December 1618*)
- Katharina Rautenstein (*1565 – 1587*), ∞ in 1579 Johann Grotjan

== Ancestry ==
Ancestors of Francis I of Saxe-Lauenburg

16. Eric IV, Duke of Saxe-Lauenburg
8. Bernard II, Duke of Saxe-Lauenburg
17. Sophie of Brunswick-Lüneburg
4. John V, Duke of Saxe-Lauenburg
18. Bogislaw VIII, Duke of Pomerania
9. Adelheid of Pomerania-Stolp
19. Sophia of Holstein
2. Magnus I, Duke of Saxe-Lauenburg
20. Frederick I, Elector of Brandenburg
10. Frederick II, Elector of Brandenburg
21. Elisabeth of Bavaria
5. Dorothea of Brandenburg
22. Frederick I, Elector of Saxony
11. Catherine of Saxony
23. Catherine of Brunswick-Lüneburg
1. Francis I, Duke of Saxe-Lauenburg
24. William the Victorious, Duke of Brunswick-Lüneburg
12. William IV, Duke of Brunswick-Lüneburg
25. Cecilia of Brandenburg
6. Henry IV, Duke of Brunswick-Lüneburg
26. Bodo VII, Count of Stolberg-Wernigerode
13. Elisabeth of Stolberg-Wernigerode
27. Anna of Schwarzburg
3. Catherine of Brunswick-Wolfenbüttel
28. Wartislaw IX, Duke of Pomerania
14. Eric II, Duke of Pomerania
29. Sophie of Saxe-Lauenburg
7. Catherine of Pomerania-Wolgast
30. Bogislaw IX, Duke of Pomerania
15. Sophia of Pomerania-Stolp
31. Maria of Masovia

== Notes ==
Francis I of Saxe-Lauenburg House of Ascania Born: 1510 Died: 19 March 1581 in Buxtehude
Regnal titles
Preceded by Magnus I	Duke of Saxe-Lauenburg; 1543 – 1571 resigned in favour of his son Magnus II	Succeeded by Magnus II
Preceded by Magnus II	Duke of Saxe-Lauenburg; 1573/1574 – 1581 deposed Magnus II by force with Francis II (son) (1578 – 1581)	Succeeded by Francis II and Maurice as Administrators of Saxe-Lauenburg
