= Henry of Saxe-Lauenburg =

16th-century Prince-Archbishop of Bremen, Prince-Bishop of Osnabruck and Paderborn

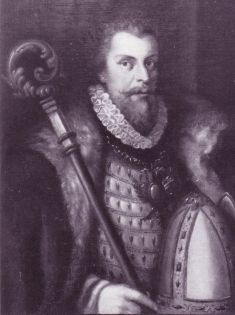
- Henry of Saxe-Lauenburg (1550-1585) as Prince-Bishop Henry II in the gallery of the bishop of Osnabrück at Iburg Castle
- Born: 1 November 1550
- Died: 22 April 1585 (aged 34); Vörde
- Noble family: House of Ascania
- Spouse: Anna Betzdorf
- Father: Francis I, Duke of Saxe-Lauenburg
- Mother: Sibylle of Saxony
- Occupation: Canon, Administrator

Henry of Saxe-Lauenburg (German: Heinrich von Sachsen-Lauenburg; 1 November 1550 – 22 April 1585, Vörde) was a Prince-Archbishop of Bremen (as Henry III), then Prince-Bishop of Osnabrück (as Henry II), then Prince-Bishop of Paderborn (as Henry IV).

== Life ==
=== Early years ===
Henry was a member of the House of Ascania, Saxe-Lauenburg line. He was the third son of Duke Francis I of Saxe-Lauenburg (1543–1581) and his wife Sibylle of Saxony, who had both converted to Lutheranism. Henry was raised Lutheran. At the age of ten, he was promised a prebend as canon (German: Domherr) at the cathedral chapter at Cologne. Since 1564 he studied at the University of Cologne under law professor Dr. Conrad Betzdorf, who housed him and his brother Frederick and was their mentor.

While his youth is recorded as wild, he is recalled as a quiet student. During his studies in Cologne Henry came to know and love Anna von Broich (Borch), who lived as foster child with Betzdorf, since her parents, Cologne's Burgomaster Heinrich von Broich and his wife Ursula, had perished in the plague in 1553. In 1565 he received the prebend and in the following year he advanced to canonicate.

In 1524 the Prince-Archbishopric of Bremen had subjected the autonomous farmers' republic of the Land of Wursten, but the Wursteners still hoped for a liberation and support from the neighbouring Saxe-Lauenburgian exclave of the Land of Hadeln. So the enfranchised capitular canons, which were mostly Lutherans since the Reformation, of Bremen Cathedral and Hamburg Cathedral chapter (with only three votes) elected Henry of Saxe-Lauenburg archbishop on 17 February 1567. Since his predecessor Prince-Archbishop George had no coadjutor, an office usually entailing the succession to the see, several dynasts applied for sons of their houses. Henry's election included a deal stipulated with Henry's father Francis I, who waived any Saxe-Lauenburgian claim to the Land of Wursten, earlier raised by his father Magnus I, as well as to the bailiwick of Bederkesa and Elmlohe, de facto held by Bremen city and abandoned the lawsuit, which Francis had brought to the Imperial Chamber Court to this end.

In his election capitulation (Wahlkapitulation) Henry covenanted to accept the privileges of the Estates of the Prince-Archbishopric (Stiftsstände) and the existing laws. Due to his minority he agreed, that Chapter and Estates would rule the Prince-Archbishopric until coming of age, paying him an annual appanage of 500 rixdollars. For the time being Henry was supposed to work towards his papal confirmation as archbishop.

=== Administrator of Bremen ===
Henry de facto assumed regency in 1569, lacking any papal confirmation. He still had to repay debts from his pre-predecessor Prince-Archbishop Christopher the Spendthrift Henry continued George's financial assanation and developed for a better financial control the budgeting for the prince-archiepicopal expenditures. While Pope Pius V remained sceptic as to Henry's faith, Emperor Maximilian II regarded Henry a true Catholic, putting in a good word for Henry. Thus Maximilian granted Henry an imperial liege indult (Lehnsindult) in 1570, investing him with the princely regalia for the prince-archbishopric although he still lacked the papal confirmation.

Therefore, Henry never officially functioned as archbishop, but as princely Administrator of the Prince-Archbishopric, however, he was nevertheless colloquially referred to as prince-archbishop. Henry always observed the Roman Catholic formalities for the episcopal consecration, although he never wanted to be a Catholic bishop. The All Saints' Flood of November 1 and 2, 1570 inflicted terrible hardship in the Bremian Elbe Marshes.

In 1571 Henry started a campaign against brigandage. Through all his episcopate the Popes Pius V and Gregory XIII as well as the Emperors Maximilian II and Rudolph II tested Henry's obedience once in a while, demanding the succession of Catholic candidates for vacancies in the Bremian Cathedral Chapter - which it sometimes accepted, sometimes denied. In 1567 the Holy See failed to replace the late Canon Christoph of East Frisia with the Catholic Wilhelm Quadt of Landskorn. Two years later Pius V prevailed with the Catholic Jodocus von Galen succeeding the Lutheran Canon Hermann Clüvers. In 1570 Pius ordered Henry to promote Verden's Catholic Cathedral Dean Nikolaus von Hemeling as Bremian cathedral provost (Dompropst), a function including the presidency of the chapter, while Maximilian demanded – using his privilege of presentation – Georg Rudell. However, the capitular canons then elected Henry's brother Frederick, succeeding the late Ludwig von Varendorf. After Frederick's death Gregory XIII demanded succession for the Catholic Theodor von Galen, and prevailed.

The chapter fulfilled the religious functions as in case of sede vacante until 26 September 1580, in order not to complicate a papal confirmation, which, however, never materialised. Henry then postponed his efforts to be recognised by Rome. The Pope succeeded to get a third Catholic canon elected into the else Lutheran chapter, Ahasver von Langen, later Provost of Zeven nunnery between 1601 and 1603, but these three never formed a Catholic opposition within the chapter.

=== Administrator of Osnabrück ===
On 23 May 1574 the cathedral chapter of Osnabrück elected Henry Bishop Henry II, as such lacking papal confirmation and imperial liege indult to rule the prince-bishopric. When the Osnabrück chapter appointed Henry administrator of the prince-bishopric, Henry swore to protect Catholic faith and to maintain peace between the denominations. The papal order not to appoint Henry administrator arrived in Osnabrück only days after his investiture, so that Henry celebrated his festive entering in the prince-bishopric in June 1574. In late 1574, the nuncio to Cologne, Kaspar Gropper, also professor at Cologne University, presented a protocol which evaluated the conditions for Henry's election in Münster and Osnabrück according to Canon Law. For Rome the recognition of Henry's election as bishop was not acceptable.

His reign in Osnabrück is overshadowed by numerous witch burnings. But he also completed the prince-episcopal Fürstenau Castle, started by his predecessor John of Hoya, while the started construction of a residential castle in Osnabrück ended with Henry's sudden death. Henry also ran for the episcopal elections of Münster in 1575, 1577 and 1580, but failed narrowly. The Catholic opposition played no relevant role in Osnabrück.

=== Marriage ===
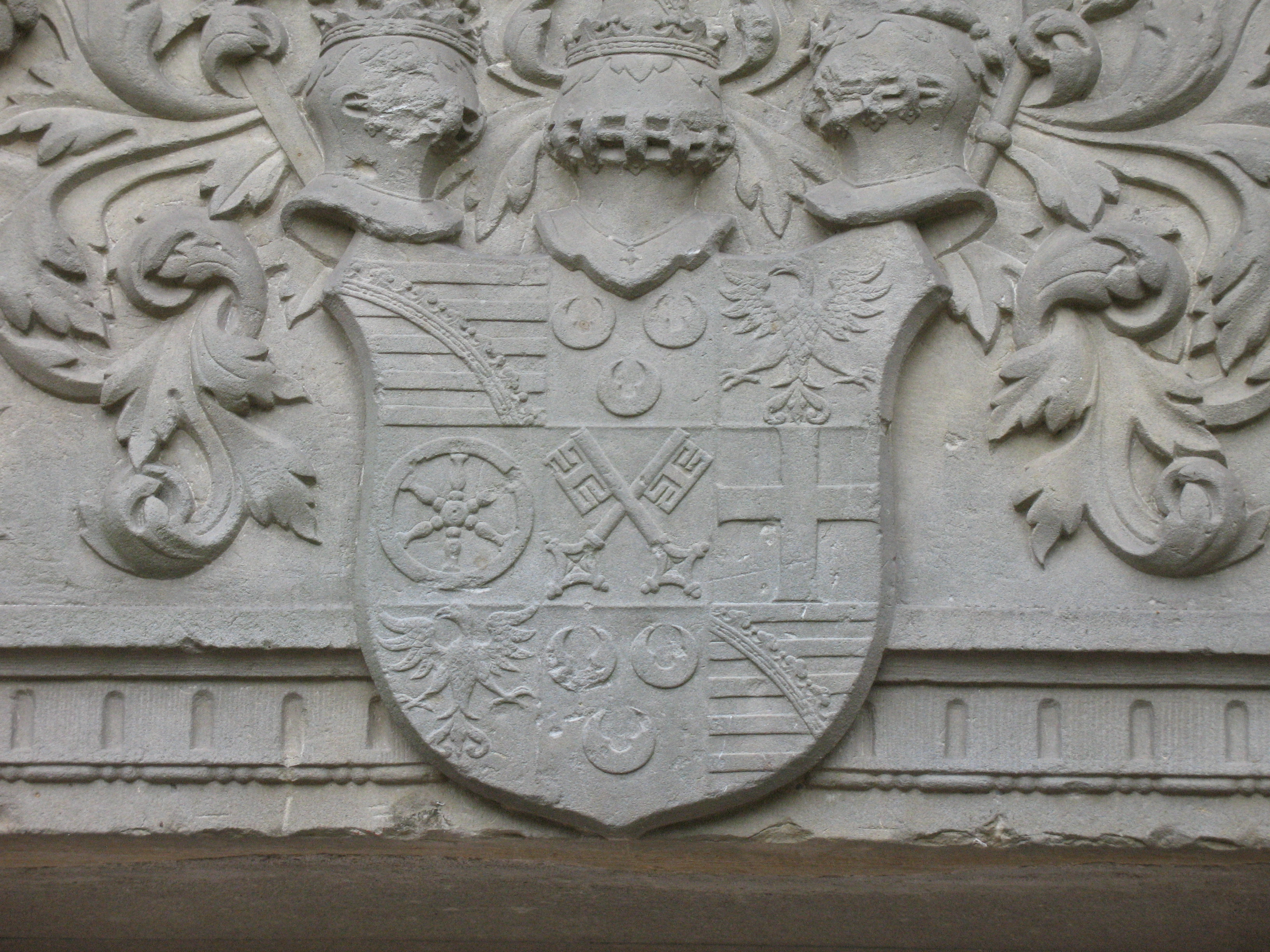
Henry's crest at Burghagen Castle in Hagen im Bremischen, showing the coats of arms of the House of Ascania (upper left and lower right field, upper and lower mid: Count of Brehna, upper right and lower left: Count Palatine of Saxony, middle fields: prince-bishop of Osnabrück, Bremen, and Paderborn (l. to r.).

On 25 October 1575, Court Preacher Hermann Gade married Henry and Anna of Broich (also known as Betzdorf) secretly in the chapel of Burghagen Castle in Hagen im Bremischen. She was supposedly the biological daughter of his mentor, professor Betzdorf in Cologne. Bremen's cathedral chapter approved the wedding, violating Henry's election capitulation, but ordered that future administrators were not to marry. As reason for the marriage, he wrote into the wedding book that he did not possess the gift of chastity. The plague befell the prince-archbishopric in 1575. The year after Henry prompted the renovation of the Vörde hospital and infirmary founded by Prince-Archbishop Johann Rode, as he generally promoted the development of his residential town.

=== Regent of Hadeln ===
Since 1576, in anticipation of the inheritance of the Land of Hadeln, Henry served as regent of that Saxe-Lauenburgian exclave, consented by Emperor Rudolph II. In return Henry paid his indebted father a compensation and assumed his debts with the Counts of Oldenburg. After his father's death in 1581 Henry inherited Hadeln and used the opportunity to renew its Church Order (Lutheran church constitution), first issued in 1526. The publication of the Estates Laws of Hadeln (Hadler Landrecht, 1583), the compilation of which his father Francis had begun, fell into Henry's regency. His brother Francis II disputed Henry as heir, but could not prevail.

=== Administrator of Paderborn ===
In 1577 Pope Gregory XIII announced to excommunicate every capitular canon, who would dare to vote for Henry as administrator. Bremen's cathedral chapter recommended Paderborn's capitulars to elect him bishop there. The cathedral chapter then ignored the papal threat and elected Henry Bishop of Paderborn, as Henry IV, on 14 October 1577. Papal confirmation and liege indult were again denied. As Paderborn's elect Henry chose the motto: "Gott ist mir Anfang und Ende" (God is beginning and end to me). In 1578, Henry ostentatively entered Paderborn accompanied by his wife. The Catholic opposition, forming in Paderborn, troubled Henry's reign there, he failed to expel the Jesuits and Nuncio to Cologne, Giovanni Francesco Bonomi, even considered his impeachment.

=== Arbitration of conflicts ===
During the warlike conflict between his brother Magnus and his father Francis I and other brothers Francis II, and Maurice, Henry functioned as arbiter. In 1581 – shortly before Francis I's death – Henry, his father, and Rudolph II consulted, unconcerted with Magnus and Maurice, concluding that Francis I made his third son Francis II, whom he considered the ablest, his sole successor, violating the rules of primogeniture in Saxe-Lauenburg. The emperor esteemed his skills and thus charged Henry with arbitrations in lawsuits at the Imperial Chamber Court and the Aulic Council.

=== Last years ===
In 1577 he codified the laws of the Bremian knightage (Bremisches Ritterrecht) and decreed a prince-archiepiscopal police ordinance. In the Prince-Archbishopric of Bremen Henry introduced a Lutheran Church Order in 1580 and the Vörde Church Constitution (Vörder Kirchenordnung) in 1582. In order to improve the Lutheran pastoring he introduced regular visitations in the parishes. Thus Henry adopted pastoral functions as a Lutheran in all the Prince-Archbishopric, also in its northeastern part, which belonged in ecclesiastical respect to the Verden See, held by Administrator Eberhard of Holle. Henry urged the Altkloster nunnery (part of today's Buxtehude) to accept the Lutheran Christoph von der Hude as their provost, however, the steadfastly Catholic nuns refused. In reaction to this development the Holy See founded the Roman Catholic Nordic Missions, an endeavour for pastoral care and mission in the area of the de facto ceased archdioceses of Bremen and of Lund. In 1581 Henry prompted a new Court Procedures Code for the Prince-Archbishopric of Bremen.

Henry had consulted his brother Francis II in developing the Church Order for the Lutheran church of Saxe-Lauenburg, which Francis decreed in 1585. In 1581 his father died in Buxtehude, a town under Henry's prince-archiepiscopal rule, also his mother and brother Maurice settled and later died there in 1592 and 1612, respectively. On Palm Sunday, 8 April 1585, after a Lutheran church service in Vörde, riding home Henry met with an equestrian accident, his horse baulked and pitched him. In his residence Vörde Castle he died of his injuries on April 22. On May 21 he was buried in Vörde's Palace Church, his grave was destroyed when the church was demolished in 1682. While in Bremen, the Catholic cause was lost forever, Henry's unexpected death led to a success for the Counter Reformation in Paderborn.

His widow inherited several estates, among them Beverstedtermühlen, which she successfully extended into a Vorwerk. However, her brother-in-law Francis II blamed her to have caused Henry's early death. Francis, after quarreling with Maurice, reacquired the Land of Hadeln for Saxe-Lauenburg.

==== Bremian Landdroste during Henry's reign ====
The chief executive of the prince-archiepiscopal government was the landdrost. During Henry's reign two landdroste officiated.

- 1561–1580: Jobst Behr (d. before 27 October 1582)
- 1580–1583: vacancy
- 1583–1585: Joist Friese (a.k.a. Jobst Frese), since 1580 per pro

Dates and names following Schleif:

== Ancestry ==
Ancestors of Henry of Saxe-Lauenburg

16. Bernard II, Duke of Saxe-Lauenburg
8. John V, Duke of Saxe-Lauenburg
17. Adelheid of Pomerania-Stolp
4. Magnus I, Duke of Saxe-Lauenburg
18. Frederick II Irontooth, Elector of Brandenburg
9. Dorothea of Brandenburg
19. Catherine of Saxony
2. Francis I, Duke of Saxe-Lauenburg
20. William IV, Duke of Brunswick and Lunenburg (Wolfenbüttel)
10. Henry IV, Duke of Brunswick and Lunenburg (Wolfenbüttel)
21. Elisabeth of Stolberg-Wernigerode
5. Catherine of Brunswick-Wolfenbüttel
22. Eric II, Duke of Pomerania-Wolgast (=#30)
11. Catherine of Pomerania-Wolgast
23. Sophia of Pomerania-Stolp (=#31)
1. Henry of Saxe-Lauenburg
24. Frederick II the Gentle, Elector of Saxony
12. Albert, Duke of Saxony
25. Margarete of Austria
6. Henry IV the Pious, Duke of Saxony
26. George of Poděbrady
13. Sidonie Podiebrad
27. Kunigunde of Sternberg
3. Sybille of Saxe-Freiberg
28. Henry IV the Fat, Duke of Mecklenburg-Schwerin
14. Magnus II, Duke of Mecklenburg-Schwerin
29. Dorothea of Brandenburg
7. Catherine of Mecklenburg-Schwerin
30. Eric II, Duke of Pomerania-Wolgast (=#22)
15. Sophia of Pomerania-Wolgast
31. Sophia of Pomerania-Stolp (=#23)

== Notes ==
Henry of Saxe-Lauenburg House of Ascania Born: 1 November 1550 Died: 22 April 1585
Regnal titles
Religious titles
Vacant Title last held by George of Brunswick and Lunenburg	Prince-Archbishop of Bremen; Lutheran Administrator as Henry III; 1567–1585	Vacant Title next held by John Adolph of Schleswig-Holstein-Gottorp
Preceded by John II of Hoya	Prince-Bishop of Osnabrück; Lutheran Administrator as Henry II; 1574–1585	Succeeded by William of Schencking
Preceded by Salentin of Isenburg	Prince-Bishop of Paderborn; Lutheran Administrator as Henry IV; 1577–1585	Succeeded by Dietrich von Fürstenberg
Regnal titles
Vacant Title last held by Magnus of Saxe-Lauenburg	Regent of the Land of Hadeln; 1576–1585	Vacant Title next held by Imperial Custody
