= Francis II of Saxe-Lauenburg =

Francis II
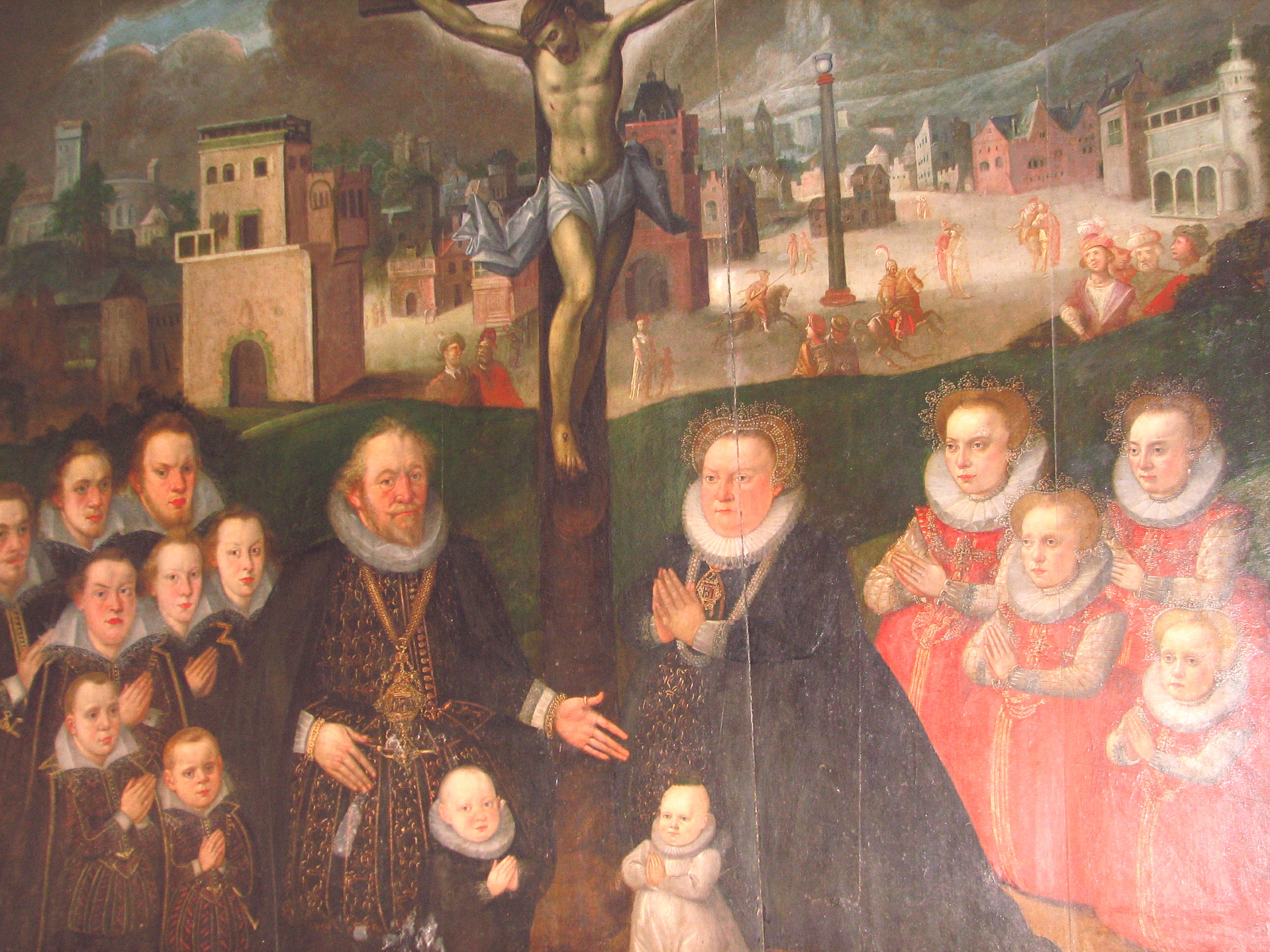
- Portrait of Francis II with his wife Mary and their family, originally in Franzhagen Castle chapel, now in St. Mary's Church in Büchen.

Duke of Saxe-Lauenburg
- Reign: 1586–1619
- Predecessor: Francis I
- Successor: Augustus
- Co-ruler: Maurice
- Born: 10 August 1547; Ratzeburg
- Died: 2 July 1619 (aged 71); Lauenburg upon Elbe
- Burial: St. Mary Magdalene Church, Lauenburg upon Elbe
- Spouse: Margaret of Pomerania-Wolgast; Maria of Brunswick-Lüneburg
- Issue more....: Augustus; Francis Julius; Julius Henry; Francis Charles; Francis Henry
- House: House of Ascania
- Father: Francis I of Saxe-Lauenburg
- Mother: Sybille of Saxe-Freiberg
- Religion: Lutheran

Francis II of Saxe-Lauenburg (Ratzeburg, 10 August 1547 – 2 July 1619, Lauenburg upon Elbe), was the third son of Francis I of Saxe-Lauenburg and Sybille of Saxe-Freiberg (Freiberg, 2 May 1515 – 18 July 1592, Buxtehude), daughter of Duke Henry IV the Pious of Saxony. From 1581 on he ruled Saxe-Lauenburg as duke.

== Life ==
As the third born son and with primogeniture in Saxe-Lauenburg Francis II made a military career in imperial services. In 1571 his highly indebted father Francis I resigned in favour of his eldest surviving son Magnus II, who had promised to redeem the pawned ducal demesnes with funds he gained as Swedish military commander and by his marriage to a Swedish princess. However, Magnus did not redeem pawns but further alienated ducal possessions, which ignited a conflict between Magnus and his father and brothers as well as the estates of the duchy, further escalating due to Magnus' violent temperament.

In 1573 Francis deposed Magnus and reascended to the throne. The following year Magnus hired troops in order to take Saxe-Lauenburg with violence. Francis II, an experienced military commander, and Duke Adolphus of Holstein-Gottorp, then Lower Saxon Circle Colonel (Kreisobrist), then helped Francis I to defeat Magnus. In return Saxe-Lauenburg had to cede the bailiwick of Steinhorst to Adolphus' Holstein-Gottorp in 1575. Francis II again helped his father to inhibit Magnus' second military attempt to overthrow his father in 1578. Francis I then made Francis II his vicegerent actually governing the duchy.

In 1581 – shortly before he died and after consultations with his son Prince-Archbishop Henry of Bremen and Emperor Rudolph II, but unconcerted with his other sons Magnus and Maurice – Francis I made his third son Francis II, whom he considered the ablest, his sole successor, violating the rules of primogeniture.

This severed the anyway difficult relations with the estates of the duchy, which fought the ducal practice of growing indebtedness. Francis only officiated as administrator of Saxe-Lauenburg. Magnus appealed at Rudolph II, who in 1585 finally decided in favour of Francis II, as agreed with Francis I in 1581. Francis II, who meanwhile had won his brother Maurice, by sharing the reign with him, lured Magnus into a trap and captured him later in 1585. Francis and Maurice kept their brother imprisoned for the rest of his life, mostly in the castle of Ratzeburg, where he died in 1603.

The violation of the primogeniture, however, gave grounds for the estates to perceive the upcoming duke as illegitimate. This forced Francis II into negotiations, which ended on 16 December 1585 with the constitutional act of the "Eternal Union" (German: Ewige Union) of the representatives of Saxe-Lauenburg's nobility and cities, Lauenburg upon Elbe and Ratzeburg, then altogether constituted as the estates of the duchy, led by the Land Marshall, a hereditary office held by the family von Bülow. Francis II accepted their establishment as a permanent institution with a crucial say in government matters. In return the estates accepted Francis II as legitimate and rendered him homage as duke in 1586.

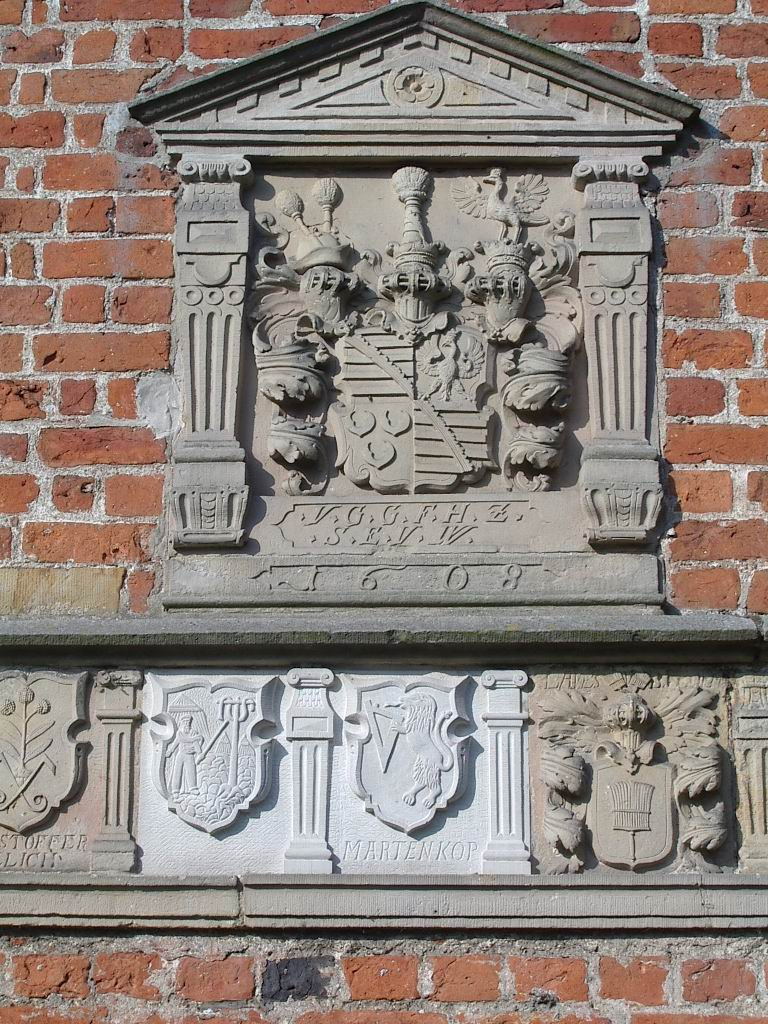
Francis' coat-of-arms as of 1608 on St. Jacobi Church in Cuxhaven. Abbreviated inscription: V.[on] G.[ottes] G.[naden] F.[ranz] H.[erzog] Z.[u] S.[achsen,] E.[ngern] V.[nd] W.[estfalen] (trl. Of God's Grace Francis Duke of Saxony, Angria and Westphalia)

The relations between estates and duke improved since Francis II redeemed ducal pawns with money he had earned as imperial commander. Already earlier in 1585, after consultations with his brother Prince-Archbishop Henry, Francis II decreed a constitution (Kirchenordnung) for the Lutheran church of Saxe-Lauenburg.

In 1592 Francis II granted his second wife Maria of Brunswick-Lüneburg a manorial estate near Schulendorf. Starting in 1608 Francis extended the existing house to a castle with a large garden, called Franzgarten or Franzhof, in the end the name Franzhagen prevailed. Francis II left workers, employed in castle constructions, short. Till his death he used the castle, which his widow Mary then used until she deceased in 1626.

In 1608 Francis II acquired the minting regal for Saxe-Lauenburg. After Maurice had died in 1612, Francis became the sole ruling duke. In 1616 the ducal residential castle in Lauenburg upon Elbe, started in 1180–1182 by Duke Bernard I, burnt down. Francis then also used another residence in Neuhaus. Francis died in 1619 and was buried in the ducal family crypt in the St. Mary Magdalene Church in Lauenburg upon Elbe, his widow Mary, died in 1626, was buried alongside him.

== Marriages and issue ==
Francis II married twice, on 26 December 1574 in Wolgast Margaret of Pomerania-Wolgast (19 March 1553 – 7 August 1581), daughter of Philip I, Duke of Pomerania-Wolgast and Maria of Saxony. Their children were the following:

- Marie (18 February 1576 – 13 March 1625, Schwarzenbek)
- Augustus (Ratzeburg, 17 February 1577 – 18 January 1656, Lauenburg upon Elbe), Duke of Saxe-Lauenburg between 1619 and 1656
- Philip (Ratzeburg, 17 August 1578 – 18 April 1605, Lauenburg upon Elbe)
- Catharina Ursula (Ratzeburg, 18 April 1580 – 18 April 1611)

On 10 November 1582 Francis II married in Wolfenbüttel his second wife, Maria of Brunswick-Lüneburg (Schladen, 13 January 1566 – 13 August 1626, Lauenburg upon Elbe), daughter of Duke Julius, Duke of Brunswick-Lüneburg, making her the new consort. Mary and Francis had 14 children, of whom the following 12 reached adulthood:

- Francis Julius (13 September 1584 – 8 October 1634, Vienna), ∞ on 14 May 1620 Agnes of Württemberg (Stuttgart, 7 May 1592 – 25 November 1629, ibidem), daughter of Duke Frederick I
- Julius Henry (Wolfenbüttel, 9 April 1586 – 20 November 1665, Prague), duke of Saxe-Lauenburg between 1656 and 1665
- Ernest Louis (7 June 1587 – 15 July 1620, Aschau)
- Hedwig Sibylla (15 October 1588 – 4 June 1635)
- Juliana (26 December 1589 – 1 December 1630, Norburg), ∞ on 1 August 1627 Friedrich of Schleswig-Holstein-Nordborg (26 October 1581 – 22 July 1658), son of John II, Duke of Schleswig-Holstein-Sonderburg
- Joachim Sigismund (31 May 1593 – 10 April 1629)
- Francis Charles (2 May 1594 – 30 November 1660, Neuhaus), ∞ in Barth on 19 September 1628 (1) Agnes of Brandenburg (Berlin, 27 July 1584 – 16 March 1629, Neuhaus), daughter of Elector John George; ∞ in Ödenburg on 27 August 1639 (2) Catherine of Brandenburg (Königsberg, 28 May 1602 – 9 February 1649, Schöningen), daughter of Elector John Sigismund
- Rudolph Maximilian (18 June 1596 – 1 October 1647, Lübeck); ∞ Anna Caterina de Dulcina
- Hedwig Maria (7 August 1597 – 29 August 1644), ∞ in 1636 Annibale Gonzaga, Prince of Bozzolo (1602 – 2 August 1668)
- Francis Albert (31 October 1598 – 10 June 1642, Schweidnitz); ∞ on 21 February 1640 in Güstrow Christina Margaret of Mecklenburg-Güstrow (Güstrow, 31 March 1615 – 6 August 1666, Wolfenbüttel), daughter of John Albert II, Duke of Mecklenburg-Güstrow
- Sophia Hedwig (Lauenburg upon Elbe, 24 May 1601 – 21 February 1660, Glücksburg); ∞ on 23 May 1624 in Neuhaus Philipp of Schleswig-Holstein-Glücksburg (15 March 1584 – 27 September 1663), son of John II, Duke of Schleswig-Holstein-Sonderburg
- Francis Henry (9 April 1604 – 26 November 1658), ∞ on 13 December 1637 in Treptow an der Rega Countess Maria Juliana of Nassau-Siegen (Siegen, 14 August 1612 – 21 January 1665, Franzhagen Castle near Schulendorf), daughter of John VII, Count of Nassau-Siegen

== Ancestry ==
Ancestors of Francis II of Saxe-Lauenburg

16. Bernard II, Duke of Saxe-Lauenburg
8. John V, Duke of Saxe-Lauenburg
17. Adelheid of Pomerania-Stolp
4. Magnus I, Duke of Saxe-Lauenburg
18. Frederick II, Elector of Brandenburg
9. Dorothea of Brandenburg
19. Catherine of Saxony
2. Francis I, Duke of Saxe-Lauenburg
20. William IV, Duke of Brunswick-Lüneburg
10. Henry IV, Duke of Brunswick-Lüneburg
21. Elisabeth of Stolberg-Wernigerode
5. Catherine of Brunswick-Wolfenbüttel
22. Eric II, Duke of Pomerania-Wolgast (=#30)
11. Catherine of Pomerania-Wolgast
23. Sophia of Pomerania-Stolp (=#31)
1. Francis II, Duke of Saxe-Lauenburg
24. Frederick II, Elector of Saxony
12. Albert, Duke of Saxony
25. Margaret of Austria
6. Henry IV, Duke of Saxony
26. George of Poděbrady
13. Sidonie Podiebrad
27. Kunigunde of Sternberg
3. Sybille of Saxony
28. Henry IV, Duke of Mecklenburg-Schwerin
14. Magnus II, Duke of Mecklenburg-Schwerin
29. Dorothea of Brandenburg
7. Catherine of Mecklenburg-Schwerin
30. Eric II, Duke of Pomerania-Wolgast (=#22)
15. Sophia of Pomerania-Wolgast
31. Sophia of Pomerania-Stolp (=#23)

== Notes ==
Francis II of Saxe-Lauenburg House of Ascania Born: 10 August 1547 in Ratzeburg Died: 2 July 1619 in Lauenburg upon Elbe
Regnal titles
Preceded by Francis I of Saxe-Lauenburg	Vicegerent of Saxe-Lauenburg; 1578–1581 with his father Francis I (Duke: 1543–1571 and 1574–1581)	Succeeded by Francis II and Maurice as administrators
Preceded by Duke Francis I with his son Francis II as vicegerent	Administrators of Saxe-Lauenburg; 1581–1586 with his brother Maurice (1581–1586)	Succeeded by Francis II; Maurice as dukes
Preceded by Francis II with his brother Maurice as administrators	Dukes of Saxe-Lauenburg; 1586–1619 with his brother Maurice (1586–1612)	Succeeded by Augustus
