= Magnus II of Saxe-Lauenburg =

Magnus II

Duke of Saxe-Lauenburg
- Reign: 1571 – 1573
- Predecessor: Francis I
- Successor: Francis I
- Born: 1543
- Died: 14 May 1603 (aged 59–60); Ratzeburg
- Burial: Ratzeburg, Castle Chapel
- Consort: Princess Sophia of Sweden
- Issue: Gustav of Saxe-Lauenburg
- House: House of Ascania
- Father: Francis I of Saxe-Lauenburg
- Mother: Sybille of Saxe-Freiberg
- Religion: Lutheran

Magnus II of Saxe-Lauenburg (1543 – 14 May 1603, in Ratzeburg) was the eldest surviving son of Duke Francis I of Saxe-Lauenburg and Sybille of Saxe-Freiberg, daughter of Duke Henry IV the Pious. In 1571 Magnus II ascended the throne after his father Francis I resigned due to indebtedness. Two years later Francis I, helped by his other son Francis (II), deposed Magnus II and re-ascended. Magnus' violent and judicial attempts to regain the duchy failed. In 1588 he was imprisoned for the remainder of his life.

== Life ==
In 1550 Francis I sought to exercise influence to compel the cathedral chapter of the neighbouring Prince-Bishopric of Ratzeburg to elect his seven-year-old son Magnus as the next prince-bishop. However, the capitular canons refused. Magnus then spent his youth at the Swedish royal court of the House of Vasa. He befriended his cousin Prince Eric and, after his ascension to the throne as King Eric XIV, Magnus fared well.

Eric XIV waged war against their common cousin King Frederick II of Denmark. Magnus advanced in this conflict, which became the Scandinavian Seven Years' War (1563–1570), to the Swedish supreme command in 1566. Magnus married Eric's half-sister Princess Sophia of Sweden in a discreet ceremony on the eve of Eric's own marriage on 4 July 1568. However, Eric came to dismiss the rather unsuccessful Magnus as supreme commander. Later Magnus swung over to Eric's half-brothers Charles and John, and Magnus invaded Stockholm with them on 29 September of that year, overthrowing Eric.

On this occasion Magnus took Katarina Stenbock, the step-mother of his wife Sophia, and her half-sister Princess Elizabeth of Sweden by boat from the royal palace of Stockholm. About 1570 Magnus prevented Katarina's plans to remarry with his brother Francis.

As a Swedish commander, and with Sophia's dowry at his disposal, Magnus had gained a considerable fortune and pursued a new prize. His father Francis I agreed to resign in favour of Magnus in 1571, in return for which Magnus promised to redeem the pawned ducal demesnes. Rather than redeeming the estates, however, Magnus, further alienated ducal possessions, for instance selling the expectancy to the pawned estates of the bailiwick (Amt) of Tremsbüttel to Duke Adolphus of Holstein-Gottorp.

This ignited a conflict between Magnus on the one hand and his father and brothers, Francis (II) and Maurice, as well as the estates of the duchy. Opposition to Magnus was also driven by a temperament notoriously prone to drink and the infliction of violence on dissenters and inferiors.

In October 1573 Francis I deposed Magnus and re-ascended the ducal throne. The following year Magnus hired, among others, Dutch troops to take Saxe-Lauenburg by force. He invaded, ravaged and plundered Ratzeburg in early October but withdrew when his brother Francis (II), an experienced military commander, and Duke Adolphus of Holstein-Gottorp, Circle Colonel (Kreisobrist) of the Circle of Lower Saxony, arrived with troops. In return Saxe-Lauenburg had to cede the bailiwick of Steinhorst to Holstein-Gottorp in 1575.

Magnus fled to his estates in Uppland in 1574, there displaying violence, wantonness and brutality. So next year his brother-in-law, the new King John III of Sweden, enfeoffed Magnus with Sonnenburg castle in Orissaare on Ösel island, recently conquered from Denmark. Magnus fell out with Klaus von Ungern, then the local Danish stadholder in Arensburg, the Danish part of Ösel. Magnus claimed the Danish island Mön as part of his estates and occupied it. Further, he robbed burghers in Pernau. His atrocities also included abuse of his wife Sophia.

The Danes complained, meanwhile Magnus fell into John's disfavour for his mistreatment of Sophia, who separated from him and stayed with their son Gustav in Sweden. In 1578 Magnus started a second attempt to conquer Saxe-Lauenburg, but was repelled by his brother Francis (II), whom - for his military success - their father rewarded with the rank of viceregent.

In 1581 - shortly before he died and after consultations with his son, the Prince-Archbishop Henry of Bremen and Emperor Rudolph II, but not negotiated with his other sons Magnus and Maurice - Francis I made his third son Francis II, whom he considered the ablest, his sole successor, violating the rules of primogeniture.

The violation of primogeniture, however, gave grounds for the estates to consider the upcoming duke as illegitimate. Francis II, though, only officiated as administrator of Saxe-Lauenburg, while Magnus II appealed to Rudolph II to endow him with the throne. On 31 January 1585 Rudolph II finally ruled in favour of Francis II, as agreed with Francis I in 1581.

Meanwhile, Francis II had won over his brother Maurice by sharing rule with him and with the estates. On 16 December 1585 Francis II accepted, by the constitutional act of the "Eternal Union" (German: Ewige Union), the establishment of the representatives of Saxe-Lauenburg's nobility and cities, Lauenburg upon Elbe and Ratzeburg, as the estates of the duchy; a permanent institution with a crucial say in government matters. In return the estates accepted Francis II as legitimate and rendered him homage as duke in 1586.

Francis II lured Magnus into a trap in Hamburg and captured him later in 1588. Magnus remained imprisoned for the rest of his life, mostly in the castle of Ratzeburg, where he died in 1603.

== Marriage and issue ==
On 4 July 1568 Magnus II married Sophia of Sweden (October 29, 1547 - March 17, 1611). After 1574 they lived in Sweden. Their marriage was unhappy and in 1578 Sophia's brother, King John III of Sweden, expelled Magnus from the kingdom. Sophia and Magnus II had one son.

- Gustav (Västerås, *31 August 1570 – 11 November 1597*, Stockholm), governor in Kalmar, died at the age of 27, leaving a son and his unmarried mother.

== Ancestry ==
Ancestors of Magnus II of Saxe-Lauenburg

16. Bernard II, Duke of Saxe-Lauenburg
8. John V, Duke of Saxe-Lauenburg
17. Adelheid of Pomerania-Stolp
4. Magnus I, Duke of Saxe-Lauenburg
18. Frederick II Irontooth, Elector of Brandenburg
9. Dorothea of Brandenburg
19. Catherine of Saxony
2. Francis I, Duke of Saxe-Lauenburg
20. William IV, Duke of Brunswick and Lunenburg (Wolfenbüttel)
10. Henry IV, Duke of Brunswick and Lunenburg (Wolfenbüttel)
21. Elisabeth of Stolberg-Wernigerode
5. Catherine of Brunswick-Wolfenbüttel
22. Eric II, Duke of Pomerania-Wolgast (=#30)
11. Catherine of Pomerania-Wolgast
23. Sophia of Pomerania-Stolp (=#31)
1. Magnus II, Duke of Saxe-Lauenburg
24. Frederick II the Gentle, Elector of Saxony
12. Albert, Duke of Saxony
25. Margarete of Austria
6. Henry IV the Pious, Duke of Saxony
26. George of Poděbrady
13. Sidonie Podiebrad
27. Kunigunde of Sternberg
3. Sybille of Saxe-Freiberg
28. Henry IV the Fat, Duke of Mecklenburg-Schwerin
14. Magnus II, Duke of Mecklenburg-Schwerin
29. Dorothea of Brandenburg
7. Catherine of Mecklenburg-Schwerin
30. Eric II, Duke of Pomerania-Wolgast (=#22)
15. Sophia of Pomerania-Wolgast
31. Sophia of Pomerania-Stolp (=#23)

== Notes ==
Magnus II of Saxe-Lauenburg House of Ascania Born: 1543 Died: 14 May 1603 in Ratzeburg
Regnal titles
Preceded by Francis I	Duke of Saxe-Lauenburg; 1571–1573	Succeeded by Francis I
