= Frederick, Duke of Saxe-Lauenburg =

Frederick of Saxe-Lauenburg (German: Herzog Friederich von Sachsen, Engern und Westfalen, colloquially Sachsen-Lauenburg) (1554–1586), was a cathedral canon at Strasbourg Minster, chorbishop at Cologne Cathedral and cathedral provost (Dompropst), a function including the presidency of the chapter, at Bremen Cathedral.

== Life ==
He was the youngest child of Francis, Duke of Saxe-Lauenburg (Franz I. von Sachsen-Lauenburg) and his wife, Sibylle of Saxony, daughter of the influential Duke Henry IV the Pious of Saxony and his wife, Katharina of Mecklenburg. Of his six brothers, he and Henry (1550–1585) followed the ecclesiastical career. Frederick was raised Lutheran, but educated Catholic. Together with Henry he studied at the University of Cologne under law professor Dr. Conrad Betzdorf, who housed him and his brother and was their mentor.

Henry was Prince-Archbishop of Bremen (as Henry III, 1567–1585), Prince-Bishop of Osnabrück (as Henry II, 1574–1585) and of Paderborn (as Henry IV, 1577–1585). As Prince-Bishop of Paderborn, Henry succeeded Salentin von Isenberg in 1577. He was the first archbishop to convert to Lutheranism and keep his honors. In 1575, he married Anna von Broich in Hagen im Bremischen, the daughter of a city councillor of Cologne, and died in 1585 in an equestrian accident in Vörde.

Frederick succeeded Bremen's cathedral provost Ludwig von Varendorf in 1570, while his brother Henry officiated as Administrator of Bremen, Frederick was followed by Provost Theodor von Galen. During the Cologne War (1583–1589), he raised an army to fight for the Catholic faction of the cathedral chapter. He was instrumental in securing the town of Kaiserswerth in 1583 for Ernest of Bavaria, the rivalling elector-archbishop of Cologne.

In 1586, during the Campaign in Cologne's Upper Electorate-Archbishopric at Hülchrath, he was part of the Ferdinand's force; in the attack on the castle, the Bavarian force was repulsed, but he himself mortally wounded. He died in Cologne shortly after the battle.

== Ancestry ==
Ancestors of Frederick, Duke of Saxe-Lauenburg

16. Bernard II, Duke of Saxe-Lauenburg
8. John V, Duke of Saxe-Lauenburg
17. Adelheid of Pomerania-Stolp
4. Magnus I, Duke of Saxe-Lauenburg
18. Frederick II Irontooth, Elector of Brandenburg
9. Dorothea of Brandenburg
19. Catherine of Saxony
2. Francis I, Duke of Saxe-Lauenburg
20. William IV, Duke of Brunswick and Lunenburg (Wolfenbüttel)
10. Henry IV, Duke of Brunswick and Lunenburg (Wolfenbüttel)
21. Elisabeth of Stolberg-Wernigerode
5. Catherine of Brunswick-Wolfenbüttel
22. Eric II, Duke of Pomerania-Wolgast (=#30)
11. Catherine of Pomerania-Wolgast
23. Sophia of Pomerania-Stolp (=#31)
1. Frederick of Saxe-Lauenburg
24. Frederick II the Gentle, Elector of Saxony
12. Albert, Duke of Saxony
25. Margarete of Austria
6. Henry IV the Pious, Duke of Saxony
26. George of Poděbrady
13. Sidonie Podiebrad
27. Kunigunde of Sternberg
3. Sybille of Saxe-Freiberg
28. Henry IV the Fat, Duke of Mecklenburg-Schwerin
14. Magnus II, Duke of Mecklenburg-Schwerin
29. Dorothea of Brandenburg
7. Catherine of Mecklenburg-Schwerin
30. Eric II, Duke of Pomerania-Wolgast (=#22)
15. Sophia of Pomerania-Wolgast
31. Sophia of Pomerania-Stolp (=#23)

== Sources ==
=== Bibliography ===
- (in German) Hennes, Johann Heinrich. Der Kampf um das Erzstift Köln zur Zeit der Kurfürsten. Köln: DuMont-Schauberg, 1878.
- Hans Wohltmann (1969). "Heinrich III. Herzog von Sachsen-Lauenburg". Neue Deutsche Biographie (in German). Vol. 8. Berlin: Duncker & Humblot. p. 354.
