= Degener Buggenhagen =

- Died: 16 July 1420; Garbodenhagen, near Stralsund

Degener Buggenhagen, also spelled Degner Buggenhagen (died: 16 July 1420 in Garbodenhagen, near Stralsund) was a German nobleman and Hereditary Lord Marshal of the Duchy of Pomerania-Wolgast.

He was a descendant of an ancient family of knights. As Hereditary Lord Marshal, he came into conflict with Cord Bonow, an influential Roman Catholic clergyman. Buggenhagen sided with the cities of Greifswald and Stralsund, which had a conflict with Bonow. During the conflict, the citizens of Stralsund burned three clergy at the stake.

After the death of Duke Wartislaw VIII of Pomerania-Wolgast in 1415, his widow Agnes led the regency for her infant sons Barnim VIII and Swantibor IV as well as her nephews Wartislaw IX and Barnim VII. She was assisted by a council, led by Bonow. Buggenhagen was a member of this council. Buggenhagen, who was supported by the cities, killed Bonow in Groß Kiesow, near Greifswald, probably in 1417 or 1419.

Duchess Agnes was so embittered that she ordered Henneke von Behr, one of her retainers, to kill Buggenhagen on 16 July 1420, when he met the young Duke Wartislaw IX at the mill of Garbodenhagen, near Stralsund, under protection of a safe conduct. The act was committed at the Duke's table. The cities of Greifswald and Stralsund demanded revenge and in 1421, von Behr and his helpers were executed in Stralsund. Deeply impressed by these events, Duke Wartislaw IX agreed in 1421 with the cities and the nobility to establish a court of law, where such conflicts could be resolved peacefully.
