= Agnes of Saxe-Lauenburg =

Duchess consort of Pomerania

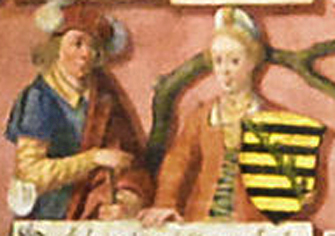
Agnes of Saxe-Lauenburg (right) with her husband, Wartislaw VIII.

Agnes of Saxe-Lauenburg (died 1435) was a Duchess consort of Pomerania by marriage to Wartislaw VIII, Duke of Pomerania. She was a daughter of Eric IV, Duke of Saxe-Lauenburg and Sophia, daughter of Magnus II, Duke of Brunswick-Lüneburg.

She was the regent of Pomerania in 1415–1425 during the minority of her children, Barnim VIII and Swantibor II, and her nephews, sons of Barnim VI: Warcislaus IX and Barnim VII.

== Issue ==
- Wartislaw (born: c. 1398 – died: 1414 or 1415)
- Barnim VIII (born: c. 1406 – died: 1451) married Anna of Wunstorf
- Swantibor IV of Pomerania (born: c. 1409 – died: between 1432 and 1436)
- Sophia (died: after 1453), married William, Lord of Werle (d. 1436)
