= Margaret of Brandenburg (1450–1489) =

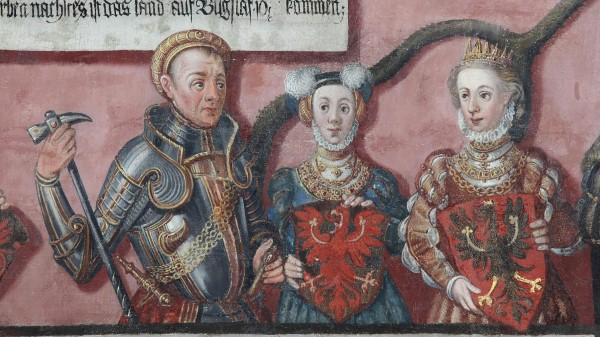
- Bogislaw X and his wives: Margaret of Brandenburg and Anna of Poland
- Born: 1449 or 1450
- Died: 1489
- Noble family: House of Hohenzollern
- Spouse: Bogislaw X, Duke of Pomerania
- Father: Frederick II, Elector of Brandenburg
- Mother: Catherine of Saxony

Margaret of Brandenburg (1449 or 1450 – 1489) was a princess of Brandenburg by birth and by marriage Duchess of Pomerania.

== Life ==
Margaret was the second daughter of the Elector Frederick II of Brandenburg (1413–1471) from his marriage to Catherine (1421–1476), daughter of the Elector Frederick I of Saxony. Only two of Frederick's four children survived him: Margaret and her older sister Dorothea.

She married on 20 September 1477 in Prenzlau with Duke Bogislaw X of Pomerania (1454–1523). In 1474, Brandenburg had begun a war against Pomerania, because Bogislaw refused to pay homage to Frederick II. On 1 May 1476, during the peace negotiations, it had been decided that Bogislaw would marry Margaret. The marriage was burdensome on Bogislaw. A very low dower had been agreed; even so, it was never paid. A year after the marriage, Bogislaw's uncle Wartislaw X died, making Bogislaw the sole ruler of Pomerania in about 200 years. In 1479, Bogislaw concluded the Peace of Prenzlau with his wife's uncle Albert III Achilles, recognizing the Elector of Brandenburg as his liege lord.

Margaret's marriage was childless and her husband accused her of infidelity and disowned her. This led to political tensions with the Electorate of Brandenburg. The elector demanded that her dowry be returned. Bogislaw, in turn, alleged that the House of Hohenzollern had given him a barren princess for a wife, so as they would get to inherit Pomerania. During the 1479 peace negotiations, Bogislaw finally signed away his wife's dower.

== Ancestors ==
Ancestors of Margaret of Brandenburg (1450–1489)

8. Frederick V, Burgrave of Nuremberg
4. Frederick I, Elector of Brandenburg
9. Elisabeth of Meissen
2. Frederick II, Elector of Brandenburg
10. Frederick, Duke of Bavaria
5. Elisabeth of Bavaria, Electress of Brandenburg
11. Maddalena Visconti
1. Margaret of Brandenburg (1450–1489)
12. Frederick III, Landgrave of Thuringia
6. Frederick I, Elector of Saxony
13. Catherine of Henneberg
3. Catherine of Saxony, Electress of Brandenburg
14. Henry the Mild, Duke of Brunswick-Lüneburg
7. Catherine of Brunswick-Lüneburg
15. Sophie of Pomerania

== References and sources ==
- Friedrich Wilhelm Barthold: Geschichte von Rügen und Pommern, vol. 4, F. Perthes, 1843
- Wilhelm Ferdinand Gadebusch: Chronik der Insel Usedom, W. Dietze, 1863, p. 96
