= Gustav of Saxe-Lauenburg =

German noble

Gustav of Saxe-Lauenburg (31 August 1570 (?) – 11 November 1597) was the eldest son of Magnus II, Duke of Saxe-Lauenburg and Sophia of Sweden, the daughter of King Gustav I of Sweden.

Gustav's father Magnus left Sweden in 1578 when he was expelled by King John III for beating his wife. John forced him to leave Gustav in the care of his mother Sofia. Gustav was raised at Ekolsund by his mother. His upbringing was seen as poor due to his mother's fickle nature and over-indulgence of her son. Duke Charles (later King Charles IX) took him in, believing he would be better off growing up at his court. In 1590, Gustav was expelled from King John's court because of excessive behavior in the taverns of Stockholm, which led to his mother's intervening on his behalf with a plea to the queen, Gunilla Bielke. In 1591, Gustav traveled to the continent and went as far as Italy, returning to Sweden in January 1594.

From 28 June he had received an income from the fiefdoms of hundreds of Håbo, Ärlinghundra and Lagunda. In 1595 he came into conflict with his mother over sharing the proceeds from his fiefdoms. Sofia's income was in danger, but the issue was solved when King Charles forced him to return the fiefdoms, which were given to his mother. Gustav's income was later bolstered by getting the rights to the church tithes. In 1597 he also received the rights of Haguna hundred and the parishes of Lagunda and Håbo that were not under Sofia's control.

In the conflict between Sigismund III Vasa and Charles IX, Gustav sided with the latter and was put in charge of Kalmar Castle on 8 June 1597. On 11 August the same year he accidentally shot himself through the knee at a muster outside of Stockholm and died on 11 November from his injuries. He was buried together with his maternal aunt, Elisabet Vasa, 21 January 1598 in Uppsala Cathedral. A cenotaph over them was added as late as 1829.

== Family ==
Gustav never married, but had an illegitimate child with Ingrid in Halkved: Source: Riksregistraturet B:90,1600 jan-juni, f 73v-74r, 1600 den 3 April: [f 73v:]

- Magnus Gustafsson Rutencrantz, 1590 – 1640
