= Sibylle of Saxony =

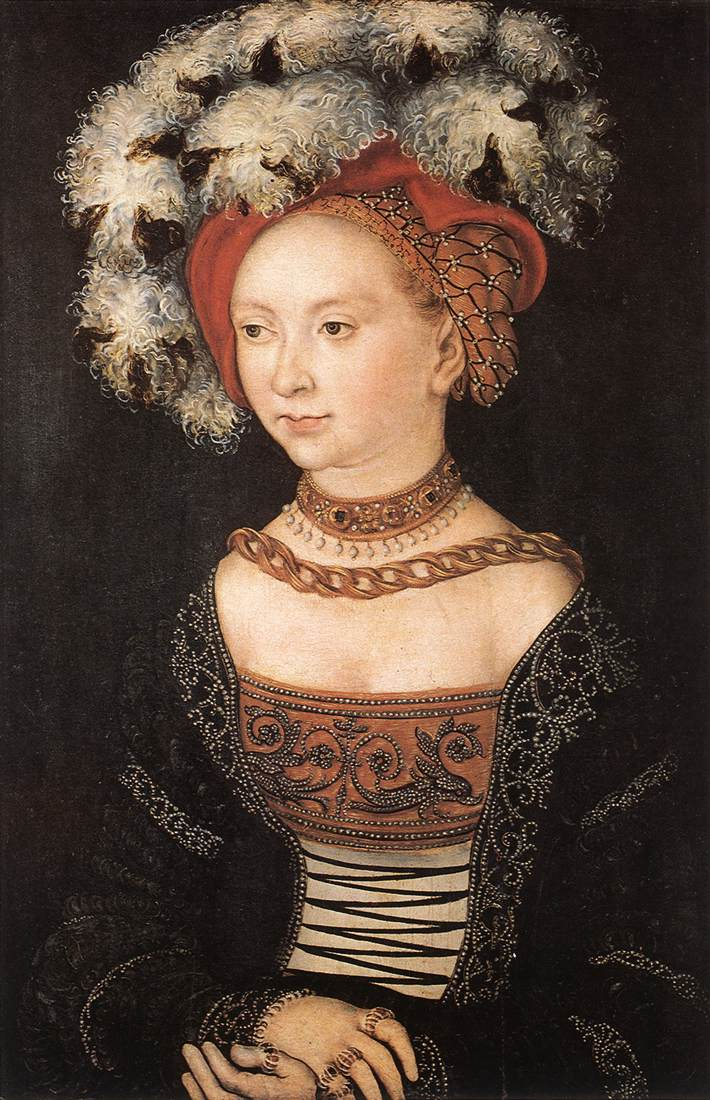
- Princess Sibylle of Saxony, Duchess of Saxe-Lauenburg, painting by Lucas Cranach the Elder

Duchess consort of Saxe-Lauenburg
- Tenure: 1543–1571; 1574–1581
- Born: 2 May 1515; Freiberg
- Died: 18 July 1592 (aged 77); Buxtehude
- Burial: Ratzeburg
- Spouse: Francis I, Duke of Saxe-Lauenburg
- Issue: Magnus II; Francis II; Henry; Maurice; Frederick
- House: House of Wettin
- Father: Henry IV, Duke of Saxony
- Mother: Catherine of Mecklenburg

Sibylle of Saxony (2 May 1515 in Freiberg – 18 July 1592 in Buxtehude) was a Saxon princess of the Albertine line of House of Wettin and by marriage Duchess of Saxe-Lauenburg.

== Life ==
Sibylle was the eldest child of the Duke Henry IV of Saxony (1473–1541) from his marriage to Catherine of Mecklenburg (1487–1561), daughter of the Duke Magnus II of Mecklenburg.

She married on 8 February 1540 in Dresden Duke Francis I of Saxe-Lauenburg (1510–1581). This relationship turned out to be important for Sibylle's brother Maurice during the Schmalkaldic War. The marriage proved unhappy and Francis accused Sibylle of vindictive and unloving acts. In later years, Sibylle and Francis reconciled again. In 1552, Sibylle asked her brother Maurice to financially assist her husband, so he could redeem some goods and villages from Lübeck.

In 1588, the Duchess played a prominent role in the affair of her son Maurice, who lived in Buxtehude in the Altkloster Abbot's House since 1585/86, with Adam von Tschammer's wife Gisela against whom she initiated a trial of witchcraft.

Sibylle died in 1592 in Buxtehude and was buried in the Cathedral of Ratzeburg.

== Children ==
From her marriage to Francis, Sibylle had the following children:

- Albert (*1542 – 1544*)
- Dorothea (Lüneburg, *11 March 1543 – 5 April 1586*, Herzberg am Harz), ∞ Wolfgang, Duke of Brunswick-Grubenhagen (*1531 – 1595*)
- Magnus II (*1543 – 14 May 1603*, Ratzeburg)
- Ursula (*1545 – 22 October 1620*, Schernebeck), married in 1569 Henry, Duke of Brunswick-Dannenberg
- Francis II (*1547 – 1619*)
- Henry (*1 November 1550 – 22 April 1585*, Vörde), as Henry III Prince-Archbishop of Bremen (1567–1585), as well as Prince-Bishop of Osnabrück (Henry II, 1574–1585) and Paderborn (Henry I, 1577–1585), married Anna von Broich
- Maurice (*1551 – 1612*), married in 1581 Katharina von Spörck, divorced in 1582
- Sidonia Catharina (*?– 1594*), married in 1567 (1) Wenceslaus III Adam, Duke of Cieszyn and in 1586 (2) Emmerich III Forgach, Upper Gespan of the Duchy of Teschen
- Frederick (*1554 – 1586*, Cologne), canon at the Cologne and Bremen Cathedrals

== Footnotes ==
German nobility
Preceded by Catherine of Brunswick-Wolfenbüttel	Duchess consort of Saxe-Lauenburg; 1543–1571	Succeeded by Sophia of Sweden
Preceded by Sophia of Sweden	Duchess consort of Saxe-Lauenburg; 1574–1581	Succeeded by Sophia of Sweden
