= Wartislaw IX =

Wartislaw IX of Pomerania-Wolgast
- Born: c. 1400
- Died: 17 April 1457; Wolgast
- Spouse: Sophie of Saxe-Lauenburg-Ratzeburg
- Issue: Eric II; Wartislav X Elizabeth; Christopher
- House: House of Griffin
- Father: Barnim VI, Duke of Pomerania
- Mother: Veronica of Nuremberg

Duke Wartislaw IX of Pomerania-Wolgast (c. 1400 – 17 April 1457, Wolgast) was the eldest son of the Duke Barnim VI, Duke of Pomerania (dynasty of Griffins) and Veronica of Hohenzollern, daughter of Frederick V, Burgrave of Nuremberg. He reigned from 1417 until his death in 1457 and he married Sophia of Saxe-Lauenburg-Ratzeburg in 1420. She was the daughter of Eric IV, Duke of Saxe-Lauenburg. They had 4 children: Eric II, Wartislav X, Elizabeth and Christopher (who died young).

In his youth, Wartislaw IX had some bad experiences. The High Marshall of Pomerania-Wolgast, Degener Buggenhagen was killed before his eyes in 1417 or 1419 by Henneke von Behr, the favorite of the Duchess Agnes, widow of his uncle Wartislav VIII. He did this because Buggenhagen had previously killed Curdt Bonow, another of the duchess's favorite. Henneke von Behr was prosecuted. Some sources say he drowned trying to escape from Usedom Castle; other sources say he was taken prisoner in his castle at Nustrow and executed in Stralsund. Probably influenced by these events, Wartislav IX agreed with the cities and nobility of his country on the establishment of a Quatember Court, to ensure the rule of law.

From 1425, Wartislav had to share power in Western Pomerania north of the Peene river with his brother Barnim VII and his cousins Barnim VIII and Swantibor IV. However, he outlived them all and at the end of his life he ruled Pomerania-Wolgast west of Swine river alone. Like his cousins in Stettin, he had to deal with the ambitions of the House of Hohenzollern, who ruled neighbouring Brandenburg from 1411 onwards. His worries focused on the Brandenburger estates of Torgelow and Pasewalk, which the Dukes of Wolgast held since 1369 as securities for a loan. A peace treaty of 1448 transferred ownership of these estates to Pomerania.

In the so-called Golden Privilege of 1452, Wartislav granted extensive concessions to the cities, especially the powerful city of Stralsund (led by mayor Otto Voge). A lasting legacy was the founding of the University of Greifswald in 1456. He died just six months after the formal opening of the alma mater gryphiswaldensis, but he had arranged numerous grants and the fledgling university was financially secure.

== Ancestors ==
Ancestors of Wartislaw IX

16. Wartislaw IV, Duke of Pomerania
8. Barnim IV, Duke of Pomerania
17. Elisabeth of Lindow-Ruppin
4. Wartislaw VI, Duke of Pomerania
18. John II of Werle
9. Sophie of Werle
19. Matilda of Brunswick-Grubenhagen
2. Barnim VI, Duke of Pomerania
20. Henry II of Mecklenburg
10. John I, Duke of Mecklenburg-Stargard
21. Anna of Saxe-Wittenberg
5. Anne of Mecklenburg-Stargard
22. Adolf VII of Holstein-Pinneberg and Schauenburg
11. Anna of Holstein-Pinneberg and Schauenburg
23. Anna of Mecklenburg-Schwerin
1. Wartislaw IX, Duke of Pomerania
24. Frederick IV, Burgrave of Nuremberg
12. John II, Burgrave of Nuremberg
25. Margaret of Gorizia
6. Frederick V, Burgrave of Nuremberg
26. Berthold VII, Count of Henneberg-Schleusingen
13. Elisabeth of Henneberg
27. Adelheid of Hesse
3. Veronica of Hohenzollern
28. Frederick I, Margrave of Meissen
14. Frederick II, Margrave of Meissen
29. Elizabeth of Lobdeburg-Arnshaugk
7. Elisabeth of Meissen
30. Louis IV, Holy Roman Emperor
15. Matilda of Bavaria, Margravine of Meissen
31. Beatrice of Silesia

== References and sources ==
- Max Bär (1896). "Wartislav IX., Herzog von Pommern-Wolgast" . Allgemeine Deutsche Biographie (in German). Vol. 41. Leipzig: Duncker & Humblot. pp. 212–213.

Wartislaw IX House of Pomerania Born: c. 1400 Died: 17 April 1457
Preceded by Barnim VI	Duke of Pomerania-Wolgast; 1405–1457; With: Barnim VII	Succeeded by Eric II
