= Barnim VIII =

Duke of Pomerania–Wolgast–Barth

Barnim VIII, Duke of Pomerania
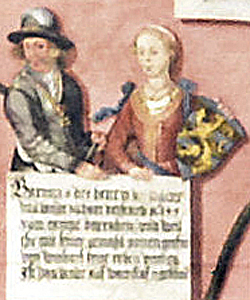
- Barnim VIII and his wife Anna
- Born: between 1405 and 1407
- Died: between 15 and 19 December 1451
- Buried: Neuenkamp Abbey
- Noble family: House of Griffins
- Spouse: Anna of Wunstorf
- Father: Wartislaw VIII, Duke of Pomerania
- Mother: Agnes of Saxe-Lauenburg

Barnim VIII, Duke of Pomerania (between 1405 and 1407 – between 15 and 19 December 1451) was Duke of Pomerania–Wolgast–Barth.

Barnim VIII was the son of Duke Wartislaw VIII of Pomerania-Wolgast. After his father's death in 1415 his widow, Agnes of Saxe-Lauenburg, initially held the guardianship of her sons Barnim VIII and Swantibor IV, and as well as the sons of her brothers-in-law Barnim VI, Wartislaw IX, and Barnim VII. Agnes was assisted by a regency council led by Kord Bonow. When the various sons came of age, Pomerania was split in 1425. Barnim VIII and Swantibor IV received Pomerania-Barth.

During the Danish-Hanseatic war Barnim VIII took part in the privateering by Denmark against the Hanseatic League. In 1427, he and his relative, the Danish king Eric of Pomerania, led a combined Danish-Swedish Fleet defeating the Hanseatic fleet in a battle in the Øresund. They captured a convoy or Hanseatic trading ships en route into the Baltic Sea. Barnim VIII also participated in tournaments. During a tournament in 1434, he was thrown from his horse by the alderman and later mayor of Stralsund, Arnd Voth.

Swantibor and Barnim divided their part of the duchy among themselves in 1435, with Swantibor receiving the island of Rügen and city of Stralsund and the Barnim receiving mainland part except Stralsund. When Swantibor died in 1440, Rügen and Stralsund fell back to Barnim. In 1441, Barnim conquered the Zingst peninsula from the Cistercian St. Nicholas Abbey at Hiddensee. With the consent of his cousins, he later pledged the dominions of Barth, Zingst and Damgarten to his niece Catherine of Werle for 20000guilders. In 1445, Barnim VII and Barnim VIII defended the city of Pasewalk against Elector Frederick II of Brandenburg.

Barnim VIII died in 1451 from the plague and was buried in the Neuenkamp Abbey.

== Marriage and issue ==
He was married to Anna of Wunstorf. They had a daughter Agnes (1434–1512); she married firstly, in 1449, Margrave Frederick III "the Fat" of Brandenburg (c. 1424-1463), and secondly, in 1478 Prince George II of Anhalt-Dessau.
