= Otto Voge =

Mayor of Stralsund
- In office 1443 – 1475
- Preceded by: Cord Bischof
- Succeeded by: Arndt Voth

Personal details
- Born: 1419
- Died: 22 August 1475 (aged 55–56) Stralsund, Germany
- Parent: Nikolaus Voge
- Occupation: Politician

Otto Voge was a 15th-century Pomeranian politician and patrician. He was mayor of the Hanseatic City of Stralsund for 27 years. Voge was born as the son of mayor Nikolaus Voge and belongs to an old Stralsundian family, that has been in city council since 1313. Otto Voge was member of the City council since 1432. In 1443 he was elected mayor.

In 1475 he died in old age in his house in Stralsund.
