= Princess Sophia of Sweden =

Sophia of Sweden
- Duchess of Saxe-Lauenburg
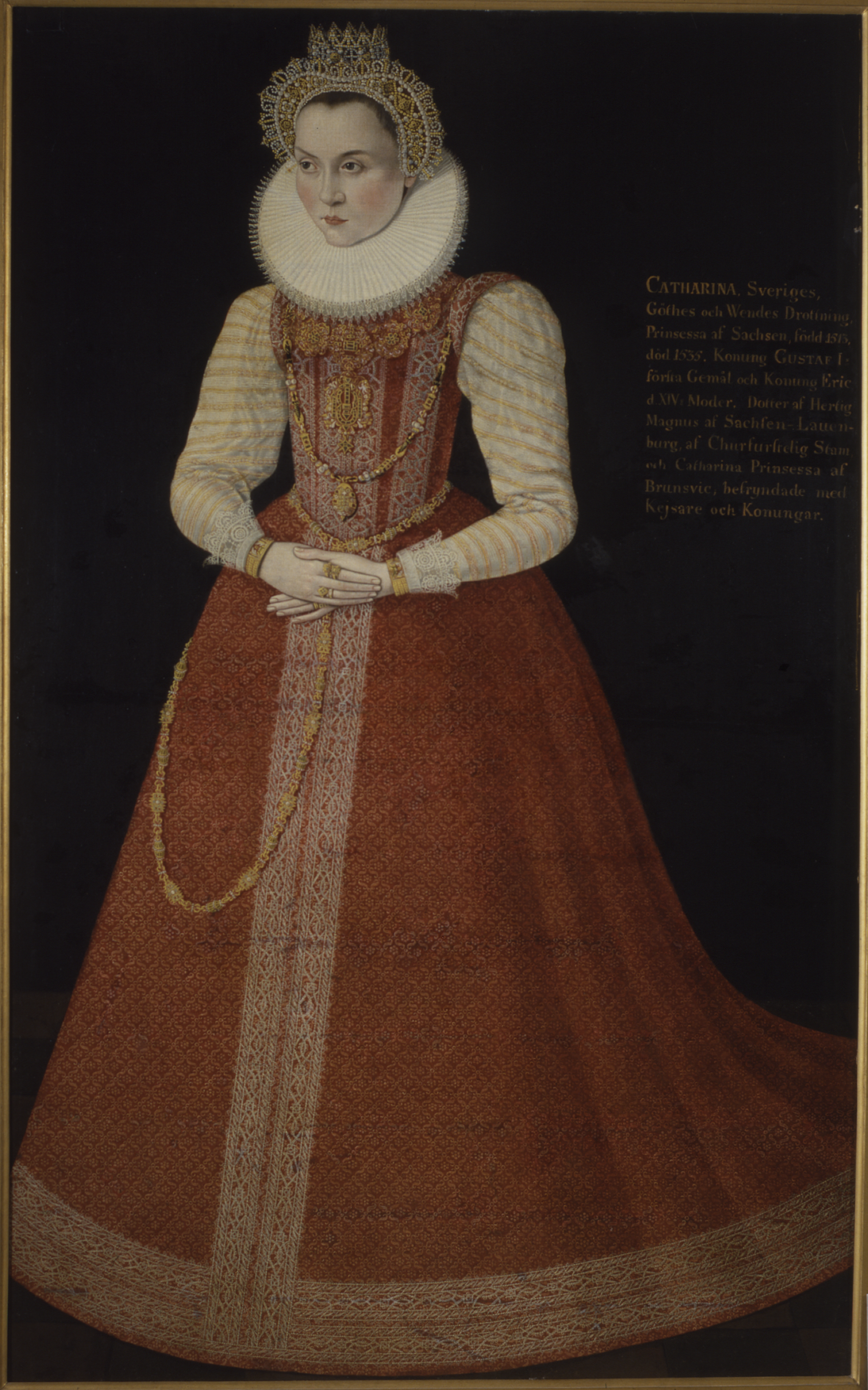
- Born: 29 October 1547
- Died: 17 March 1611 (aged 63)
- Spouse: Magnus II, Duke of Saxe-Lauenburg
- Issue: Gustav of Saxe-Lauenburg
- House: Vasa
- Father: Gustav I of Sweden
- Mother: Margaret Leijonhufvud

Princess Sophia of Sweden, also Sofia Gustavsdotter Vasa (29 October 1547 – 17 March 1611), was a Swedish princess, daughter of King Gustav Vasa of Sweden and Margareta Leijonhufvud. She was formally Duchess consort of Saxe-Lauenburg by her marriage to Duke Magnus II of Saxe-Lauenburg.

== Biography ==
During her early childhood, she, as well as her siblings in the royal nursery, were primarily under the care of her mother, the queen's trusted nurse, Brigitta Lars Anderssons, her mother's cousin lady Margareta, and the noble widow Ingrid Amundsdotter.

After the death of her mother in 1551, she as well as her siblings were placed in the care of Christina Gyllenstierna and then under her aunts Brita and Martha Leijonhufvud before her father's remarriage to Catherine Stenbock. They were then under the responsibility of their stepmother and, more precisely, the head-lady-in-waiting Anna Hogenskild.

During the Northern Seven Years' War, the Danish queen dowager Dorothea of Saxe-Lauenburg suggested a peace treaty by marriage between her younger son, younger brother of the Danish monarch, and Sophia. However, she made the suggestion without her son, the king’s, knowledge, and he did not support the idea.

In March 1566, Sophia became engaged to Duke Magnus II of Saxe-Lauenburg, who had long been in the service of Eric. The marriage took place in a double wedding when her half brother King Eric XIV married Karin Månsdotter on 4 July 1568. Eric may have arranged the marriage of Sophia and Magnus because he needed support for his controversial marriage to Karin Månsdotter. It is also possible that he feared he would not have the wedding guests he wanted unless he had Sophia's wedding conducted in parallel.

In the negotiations, Magnus promised to defend Karin Månsdotter. Sophia did not want the marriage—she refused and stalled preparations for the wedding, which prevented it from taking place in June 1567 as first planned when Eric married Karin for the first time. Eric therefore ordered that, since Sophia refused to prepare for the wedding, preparations should be made for her—and her wedding would take place together with his own second, public wedding ceremony with Karin.

=== Marriage ===
At the wedding in Stockholm in July 1568, Sophia walked in the procession with her sister Elizabeth—after Karin, who walked first with queen dowager Catherine Stenbock, which was considered unsuitable to rank. Neither Sophia nor her sister Elizabeth attended Karin's following coronation. During the deposition of Eric XIV, Sophia, Magnus evacuated Elizabeth and Catherine Stenbock by boat, and took them to the rebellious John in Uppsala. John officially claimed, that Eric had planned to give them as hostages to Russia, in place of John's own consort, which he had tried before.

The marriage became extremely unhappy. Reports describe Magnus as a typical brutal German mercenary, notorious for his abuse of his subordinates. Early on, it became known that he subjected Sophia to spousal abuse—apparently motivated by severe jealousy. According to the chronicle of Aegidius Girs, Sophia became insane by the treatment she was given by Magnus, who: "...showed his princess all unkindness, spit and shameful slander, that she of the sorrow was caused great weakness of the head."

In 1571, Magnus pawned her jewelry to finance his conquest of Sachsen-Lauenburg. He soon spent her money, and Sophia was forced to constantly ask her family to finance his ambitions. In 1575, her brother King John III granted Magnus the Swedish fief Sonnenburg on Ösel to make him leave Sweden, but he was soon cast out from Ösel because of his brutal rule. Magnus soon became unpopular with Sophia's family because of how he treated her.

He also came in conflict with John III in 1576 when he forbid his subjects in Sophia's fief from paying taxes and executing their working duty for the crown. In 1577, reports said that Magnus prevented Sophia from receiving letters from her family and accepting invitations, and isolated her from the outside world.

=== Later life ===
In 1578, John III had Magnus arrested, imprisoned, and exiled from the country. He forced Magnus to leave his and Sophia's son in her care, and put Sophia's fiefs in her sole name. John III granted her the fiefs Ekolsund Castle and Venngarn Castle. In 1581, reports had Magnus spreading rumors in Germany about Sophia. John had the Emperor ban Magnus from making slanders against Sophia that could blacken her name and endanger her son's inheritance and her right to her dower lands.

Sophia devoted later life to her son Gustav. She worked to ensure his rights in Sachsen-Lauenburg and his future. She kept Gustaf with her rather than send him away as was the custom, and was said to spoil him to a point where his character was destroyed.

In 1595, she came into conflict when Gustaf persuaded her to grant him half of her fief—which she retracted with the assistance of her brother Charles.

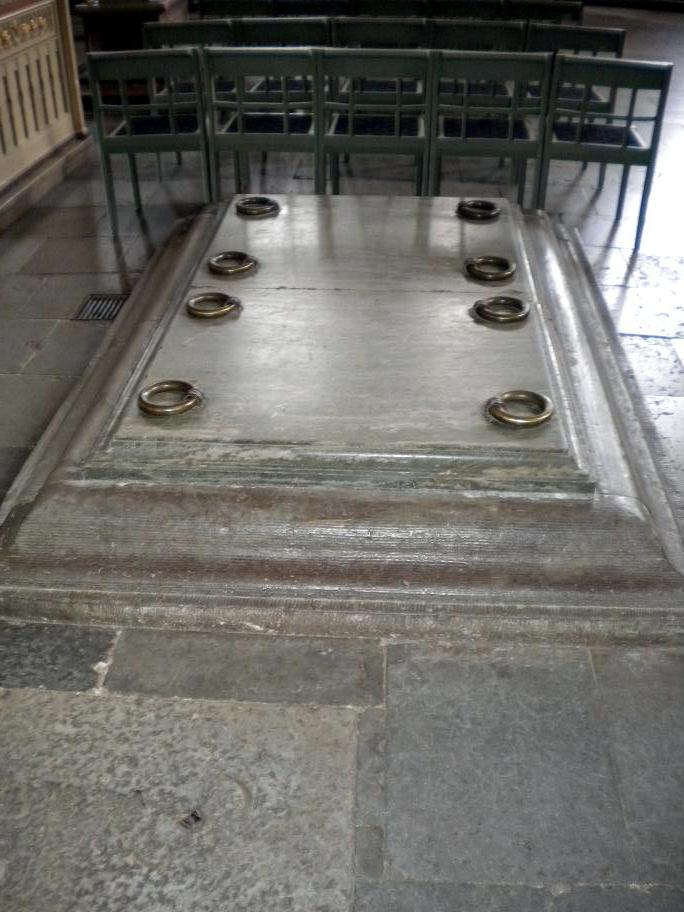
Floor hatch in Strängnäs Cathedral leading to her brother Charles IX's family crypt, where Sophia's remains also were interred

Sophia lived the rest of her life at Ekolsund Castle. In contrast to her siblings, she supported the marriage between John III and Gunilla Bielke in 1585. Sophia was said to have suffered from a mental illness of some kind. Aside from the chronicle of Aegidius Girs, this is not mentioned much. However, in correspondence, her siblings often asks her not to mourn too much, to prevent her from getting ill.

In contrast to her brother Magnus, who was acknowledged as mentally ill and was isolated because of it, Sophia participated occasionally in court life, such as when she participated in a public dinner with the royal family in Kalmar at Easter 1586. She is not described as an efficient administrator of her estate and court: she was often forced to ask for economical assistance because of her misused lands, and her court was unstable with frequent changes of staff: she changed her chamberlain twenty-one times and her housekeeper twenty-three times during these years. In 1597, she was granted the fiefs Lagunda and Håbo. She became a widow when her absent husband died in 1603.

=== Issue ===
Sophia had six children, but only one of them lived past infancy:

- Gustav of Saxe-Lauenburg, (31 August 1570 – 11 November 1597), governor of Kalmar, unmarried but had issue

== Ancestry ==
Ancestors of Princess Sophia of Sweden

Johan Kristiersson (Vasa)
Erik Johansson (Vasa)
Birgitta Gustafsdotter (Sture)
Gustav I of Sweden (Vasa)
Måns Karlsson (Eka)
Cecilia Månsdotter (Eka)
Sigrid Eskilsdotter (Banér)
Sophia of Sweden (Vasa)
Abraham Kristiernsson (Leijonhufvud)
Erik Abrahamsson (Leijonhufvud)
Birgitta Månsdotter (Natt och Dag)
Margareta Leijonhufvud
Erik Karlsson (Vasa)
Ebba Eriksdotter (Vasa)
Anna Karlsdotter (Vinstorpa)

German nobility
Preceded by Sibylle of Saxony	Duchess consort of Saxe-Lauenburg; 1571–1574	Succeeded by Sibylle of Saxony
Preceded by Sibylle of Saxony	Duchess consort of Saxe-Lauenburg; 1574–1581; Served alongside: Margaret of Pomerania-Wolgast(1581) and Katharina von Spörck (1581–1582) later Marie of Brunswick-Wolfenbüttel (1582–1588)	Succeeded by Marie of Brunswick-Wolfenbüttel
