= Wartislaw VIII =

Duke of Pomerania-Wolgast

Wartislaw VIII, Duke of Pomerania
- Born: 1373
- Died: 20 or 23 August 1415
- Noble family: House of Griffins
- Spouse: Agnes of Saxe-Lauenburg
- Issue Detail: Barnim VIII, Duke of Pomerania
- Father: Wartislaw VI, Duke of Pomerania
- Mother: Anne of Mecklenburg-Stargard

Wartislaw VIII (1373 – 20 or 23 August 1415) was a duke of Pomerania from the House of Griffins house. He ruled in Pomerania-Wolgast from 1394 together with his brother Barnim VI. After Barnim died in 1405, he ruled alone.

== Life ==
Wartislaw VIII was the second son of Duke Wartislaw VI of Pomerania-Wolgast and his wife, Anne of Mecklenburg-Stargard.

His father initially intended that Wartislaw would join the clergy. At the age of 14, he was appointed the Archdeacon at Tribsees. But in 1393 he left the clergy to marry. According to later tradition, he made a pilgrimage to the Holy Land to obtain the required dispensation. He possibly started this pilgrimage together with his cousin Wartislaw VII of Pomerania-Stolp, who had to break off the journey due to illness.

After the death of his father, Wartislaw VI, in 1394, Wartislaw VIII ruled Pomerania-Wolgast jointly with his elder brother Barnim VI. During their joint reign, they sometimes joined the Hanseatic League in the fight against the piracy. Sometimes, however, Duke Barnim VI himself operated as a pirate, leading to a tense relationship with the Hanseatic League and the Teutonic Knights. Barnim VI died in 1405.

After his brother's death, Wartislaw VIII ruled Pomerania-Wolgast alone, and acted as guardian for his brother's two sons Wartislaw IX (born: 1400) and Barnim VII (born: c. 1404). He settled his dispute with the Grand Master of the Teutonic Knights in March 1406 and undertook a pilgrimage to Rome, where Pope Gregory XII gave him a Golden Rose. After his return, Wartislaw gave the Golden Rose to the Pudagla Monastery, where it was soon revered as miraculous. It was later destroyed by abbott Henry, who ruled 1479–1493, because it had become an idol.

During his reign, there was an incident in Stralsund, known as the Papenbrand thom Sunde. Ans angry crowd burned three priests at the stake. Wartislaw mediated an atonement in 1409, but could not settle the issue permanently.

In the struggle between the Dukes of Pomerania-Stettin, i.e. Swantibor III and later his sons Otto II and Casimir V against Elector Frederick I of the Mark Brandenburg, Wartislaw sided with the latter. In 1413, he concluded an alliance with Frederick and Wartislaw's oldest son, also named Wartislaw, was engaged to Frederick's daughter Margaret. However, Wartislaw junior died one or two years later, before he could marry Margaret. Wartislaw VIII and Frederick travelled together to the Council of Constance, where Emperor Sigismund invested Wartislaw as Duke of Pomerania. However, Wartislaw then had to travel back to Pomerania to deal with riots and could not participate with the council, such as the burning of the heretic John Huss.

Duke Wartislaw VIII died on 20 August 1415. He was buried in the St. Peter's Church in Wolgast. After his death, his widow Agnes and regency council acted as regent for his own sons Barnim VIII and Swantibor IV as well as his brother's sons Wartislaw IX and Barnim VII, until Wartislaw IX, the eldest of the four, took over in 1417.

== Marriage and issue ==
Duke Wartislaw VIII married Agnes, a daughter of Duke Eric IV of Saxe-Lauenburg. They had four children:

- Wartislaw (born: c. 1398 – died: 1414 or 1415)
- Barnim VIII (born: c. 1406 – died: 1451) married Anna of Wunstorf
- Swantibor IV of Pomerania (born: c. 1409 – died: between 1432 and 1436)
- Sophia (died: after 1453), married William, Lord of Werle (d. 1436)

His widow Agnes died in 1435 and was buried in Pudagla Monastery.
