= Magnus I of Saxe-Lauenburg =

Magnus I
- Duke of Saxe-Lauenburg
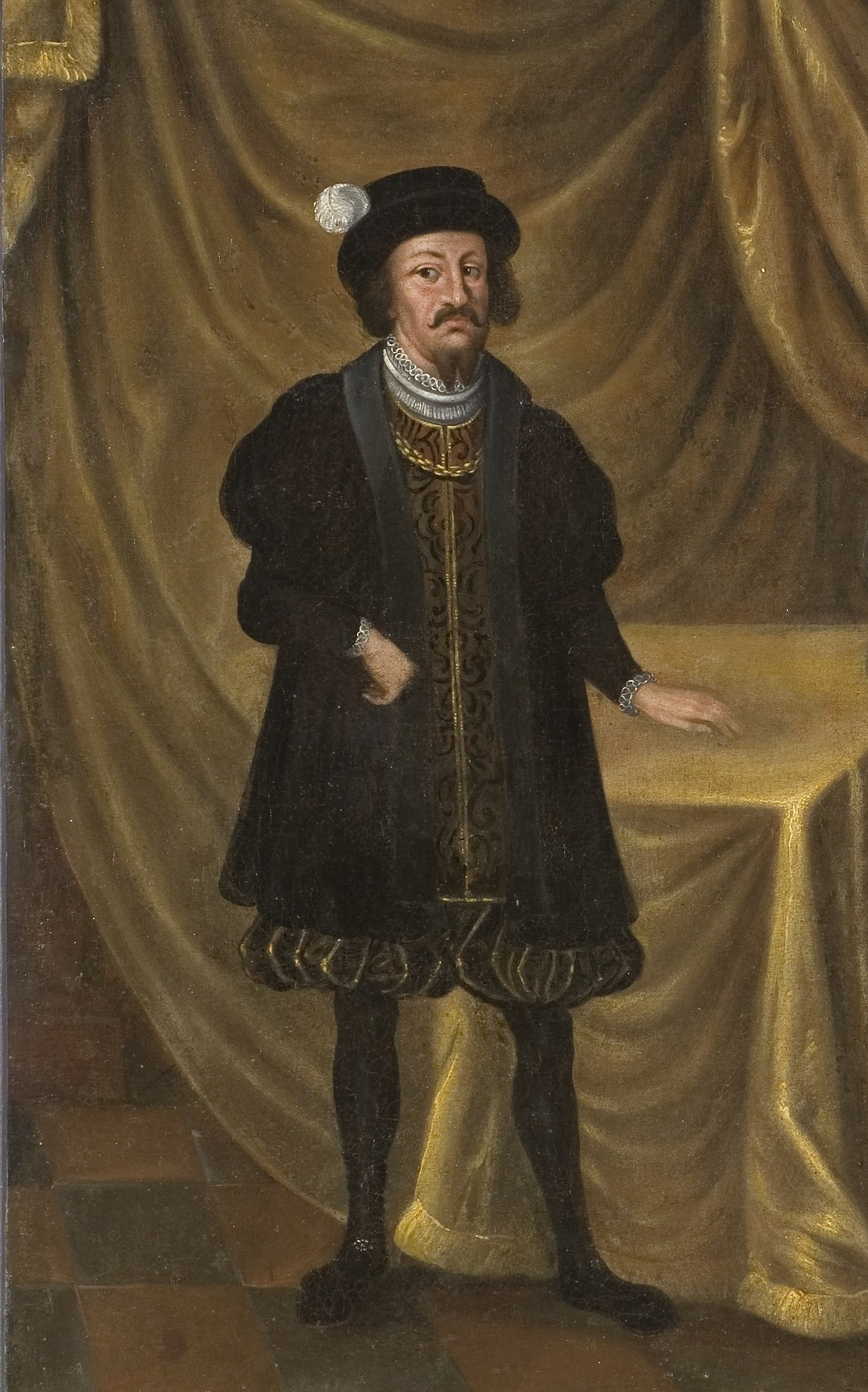
- Portrait by unknown, c. 1520

Duke of Saxe-Lauenburg
- Reign: 1507–1543
- Predecessor: John V, Duke of Saxe-Lauenburg
- Successor: Francis I, Duke of Saxe-Lauenburg
- Born: 1 January 1470; Ratzeburg
- Died: 1 August 1543 (aged 73); Ratzeburg
- Burial: Ratzeburg
- Spouse: Catherine of Brunswick-Wolfenbüttel
- Issue Detail: Francis I, Duke of Saxe-Lauenburg; Dorothea, Queen of Denmark; Catherine, Queen of Sweden; Clara, Duchess of Brunswick-Giffhorn; Sophia, Countess of Oldenburg-Delmenhorst; Ursula, Duchess of Mecklenburg-Schwerin
- House: Ascania
- Father: John V, Duke of Saxe-Lauenburg
- Mother: Dorothea of Brandenburg
- Religion: Roman Catholic until 1531, thereafter Lutheran

Magnus I of Saxe-Lauenburg (1 January 1470 – 1 August 1543) was a Duke of Saxe-Lauenburg from the House of Ascania.

== Life ==
Magnus was born in Ratzeburg, the second son of John V, Duke of Saxe-Lauenburg and Dorothea of Brandenburg, daughter of Frederick II, Elector of Brandenburg.

In 1481 John V redeemed Saxe-Lauenburg's exclave Land of Hadeln, which had been pawned to Hamburg as security for a credit of 3,000 Rhenish guilders since 1407. John V then made his son and heir apparent, Magnus, vicegerent of Hadeln, and finally regent as of 1498.

== Vicegerent and regent of the Land of Hadeln ==
In 1484 Magnus, who aimed at increasing his local revenues, had reached out to conquer the rich neighbouring Land of Wursten, a de facto autonomous region of free Frisian peasants in a North Sea marsh at the Weser estuary, but he failed Magnus tried to justify his violent act with the pretence that Wursten used to be Saxon before the imperial deposition of Duke Henry the Lion and the carve-up of his Duchy of Saxony in 1180, which only brought Magnus' Ascanian dynasty to take the belittled dukedom. The Prince-Archbishopric of Bremen, claiming Wursten for itself, was alarmed.

After becoming Regent Magnus planned a new conquest of Wursten. On 24 November 1498 Magnus allied with his father and Henry IV, Duke of Brunswick-Lüneburg to conquer Wursten. Henry IV obliged to send 3,000 lansquenets, who should gain their payment by ravaging and plundering the free peasants of Wursten, once successfully subjected. Bremen's Prince-Archbishop Johann Rode had prepared for this, he and Hamburg's three burgomasters (upcoming, presiding, and outgoing), Johannes Huge, Hermen Langenbeck and Henning Buring had concluded a defensive alliance on 16 November. Hamburg feared for its exclave Ritzebüttel, its military outpost at the Outer Elbe to defend the free access to Hamburg via Elbe, thus the city became the driving force in preparing everything for Magnus' eventual attack.

Rode appealed at the burghers of Bremen, Hamburg and Stade, which considered the areas downstream the rivers Elbe and Weser their own front yard existential for their free maritime trade connections, so the three cities supported Rode, who further won the Ditmarsians, free peasants under Bremen's loose overlordship. On 1 May Rode gathered representatives of the Land of Wursten, of the cities of Hamburg and Bremen and they concluded a defensive alliance in favour of Wursten in case of another invasion by John XIV of Oldenburg, who had conquered westerly neighbouring Butjadingen in April with the help of the Black Guard.

Wursten was thus threatened by Oldenburg from the west and by Magnus from the east. In order to avoid war on two fronts Rode tried to ease the relation with Magnus, but in vain. On 1 August Rode, Bremen's cathedral chapter, more prelates from the prince-archbishopric, as well as the cities of Bremen, Buxtehude, Hamburg, and Stade concluded a war alliance to supply 1,300 warriors and equipment to defend Wursten and / or invade Hadeln, while all members of Bremian ministerialis and nobility abstained. Many a member of ministerialis and nobility rather sided with Magnus. Finally on 9 September 1499 Rode waged feud against John V and Magnus. The allied forces easily conquered the Land of Hadeln, defeating Magnus and even driving him out of Hadeln.

By 20 November 1499 Magnus hired the so-called Great or Black Guard of ruthless and violent Dutch and East Frisian mercenaries, commanded by Thomas Slentz, prior operating in Oldenburg. Their invasion into the prince-archbishopric was repelled at Bremen, however, upstream they succeeded to cross the Weser in the neighbouring Prince-Bishopric of Verden near Verden city by the end of November, ravaging the prince-bishopric, especially looting and robbing the monasteries, heading northeastwards towards Lüneburg-Celle. Having crossed the latter's border the Guard turned westwards into the Bremian prince-archbishopric, by-passing the fortified Buxtehude and Stade, leaving behind a wake of devastation on the countryside and in the monasteries (Altkloster, Neukloster, both localities of today's Buxtehude, Himmelpforten Convent).

Since prince-archiepiscopal forces secured Vörde the Guard circumvented them southerly, not sparing Zeven Nunnery. Finally on Christmas Eve arriving downstream the Weser in Lehe the Black Guard tried to invade Wursten, however, the free peasants there repelled their attack near Weddewarden on 26 December. So the Guard turned northeastwards, looting Neuenwalde Nunnery underways, into Hadeln, recapturing it for Magnus in early 1500. For the Hadelers, however, this invasion meant no less man slaughter, looting and incendiary than for the rural population in the prince-archbishopric.

By early December Rode turned for help to Duke Henry IV the Elder, who was actually allied with Magnus. In return Rode had to offer appointing Henry's 12-year-old son Christopher as his coadjutor, a position usually (as coadiutor cum iure succedendi), and in this case indeed, entailing the succession to the respective see. This exactly accomplished Henry's own expansionist ambitions, so he changed sides, dropped the alliance with Magnus and John V in order to militarily support the prince-archbishopric.

Henry IV the Elder and his troops were now hunting the Black Guard. Magnus, unable to pay the mercenaries so that they turned even the more oppressive for Hadeln's population, was like the Sorcerer's Apprentice, who could not get rid of "the spirits that he called". By mid-January 1500 King John of Denmark finally hired the Guard and guaranteed for its safe conduct to his Holstein. King John employed the Black Guard in order to subject Ditmarsh. It were the Ditmarsians then, who destroyed the Black Guard utterly in the Battle of Hemmingstedt on 17 February 1500 and thus King John's dream of subjecting them.

Magnus conflict with Bremen was solved through the mediation of Eric I, Duke of Brunswick-Calenberg and Henry IV with the latter's son Coadjutor Christopher (Prince-Archbishop of Bremen as of 1511). So Rode and Magnus had concluded peace on 20 January 1500. Hadeln was restored to Magnus, while the Wursteners rendered homage to Rode on 18 August, who in return had confirmed their autonomy, thus in fact little had changed as compared with the status quo ante.

== Duke of Saxe-Lauenburg proper ==
During the declining years of his father he governed the country and succeeded his father as the regnant Duke in 1507. The first years of his governing has been filled by various conflicts with the Prince-Archbishopric of Bremen and its suffragan Prince-Bishopric of Ratzeburg. Through his marriage with Catherine in 1509 Magnus further intensified his ties with her father Henry IV, Duke of Brunswick-Wolfenbüttel, his deserted former war ally.

Magnus was the first Duke of Saxe-Lauenburg, who adopted a compliant position as to the dispute on the electoral privilege between Saxe-Lauenburg and Saxe-Wittenberg. He refrained from showing on his coat-of-arms on a sable and argent background the electoral swords (German: Kurschwerter) in gules. The electoral swords indicated the office as Imperial Arch-Marshal (Erzmarschall, Archimarescallus), pertaining to the privilege as prince-elector, besides the much more important right to elect the new emperor after the decease of the former.

Charles V, Holy Roman Emperor, enfeoffed Magnus with the Duchy of Saxony, Angria and Westphalia (so its official name, but colloquially Saxe-Lauenburg) and the pertaining regalia at the imperial diet in Augsburg on 12 November 1530. The imperial writ of feoffment emphasises, that Magnus had requested to be also enfeoffed with the Saxon electoral privilege, however, further explaining that this could not happen at that time "due to moving reasons". For Sigismund, Holy Roman Emperor, had already enfeoffed the House of Wettin with the Electorate of Saxony on 1 August 1425.

In 1531 Magnus introduced the Reformation in his duchy and became Lutheran, as did most of his subjects. Magnus died and was buried in Ratzeburg.

== Family and children ==
He was married on 17–20 November 1509 with Catherine (1488 – 29 July 1563) in Wolfenbüttel, daughter of Duke Henry IV, Duke of Brunswick-Lüneburg, and they had six children:

- Francis I, Duke of Saxe-Lauenburg (1510 – 19 March 1581)
- Dorothea (9 July 1511 – 7 October 1571), married on 29 October 1525 to King Christian III of Denmark
- Catherine (24 September 1513 – 23 September 1535), married on 24 September 1531 to King Gustav I of Sweden
- Clara (13 December 1518 – 27 March 1576), married on 29 September 1547 to Francis, Duke of Brunswick-Lüneburg, Prince of Gifhorn
- Sophia (1521 – 13 May 1571), married on 1 January 1537 to Anthony I, Count of Oldenburg-Delmenhorst
- Ursula (ca. 1523 – 31 December 1577, Minden), married on 14 May 1551 to Henry V, Duke of Mecklenburg-Schwerin

== References and external links ==
- Elke Freifrau von Boeselager, "Das Land Hadeln bis zum Beginn der frühen Neuzeit", in: Geschichte des Landes zwischen Elbe und Weser: 3 vols., Hans-Eckhard Dannenberg und Heinz-Joachim Schulze (eds.), Stade: Landschaftsverband der ehem. Herzogtümer Bremen und Verden, 1995 and 2008, vol. I 'Vor- und Frühgeschichte' (1995), vol. II 'Mittelalter (einschl. Kunstgeschichte)' (1995), vol. III 'Neuzeit (2008)', (=Schriftenreihe des Landschaftsverbandes der ehem. Herzogtümer Bremen und Verden; vols. 7–9), ISBN (vol. I) ISBN 978-3-9801919-7-5, (vol. II) ISBN 978-3-9801919-8-2, (vol. III) ISBN 978-3-9801919-9-9, vol. II: pp. 321–388.
- Otto von Heinemann (1884). "Magnus I. Herzog von Sachsen-Lauenburg" . Allgemeine Deutsche Biographie (in German). Vol. 20. Leipzig: Duncker & Humblot. p. 72.
- Karl Ernst Hermann Krause (1881). "Johann III. (Erzbischof von Bremen)" . Allgemeine Deutsche Biographie (in German). Vol. 14. Leipzig: Duncker & Humblot. pp. 183–185.
- Karl Schleif, Regierung und Verwaltung des Erzstifts Bremen, Hamburg: no publ., 1972, (=Schriftenreihe des Landschaftsverbandes der ehemaligen Herzogtümer Bremen und Verden; vol. 1), zugl.: Hamburg, Univ., Diss., 1968.
- Michael Schütz, "Die Konsolidierung des Erzstiftes unter Johann Rode", in: Geschichte des Landes zwischen Elbe und Weser: 3 vols., Hans-Eckhard Dannenberg and Heinz-Joachim Schulze (eds.), Stade: Landschaftsverband der ehem. Herzogtümer Bremen und Verden, 1995 and 2008, vol. I 'Vor- und Frühgeschichte' (1995), vol. II 'Mittelalter (einschl. Kunstgeschichte)' (1995), vol. III 'Neuzeit (2008)', (=Schriftenreihe des Landschaftsverbandes der ehem. Herzogtümer Bremen und Verden; vols. 7–9), ISBN (vol. I) ISBN 978-3-9801919-7-5, (vol. II) ISBN 978-3-9801919-8-2, (vol. III) ISBN 978-3-9801919-9-9, vol. II: pp. 263–278.

Magnus I of Saxe-Lauenburg House of Ascania Born: 1 January 1470 Died: 1 August 1543
Regnal titles
Preceded by John V	Duke of Saxe-Lauenburg; 1507–1543	Succeeded by Francis I
