= Catherine of Brunswick-Wolfenbüttel, Duchess of Saxe-Lauenburg =

Catherine of Brunswick-Wolfenbüttel
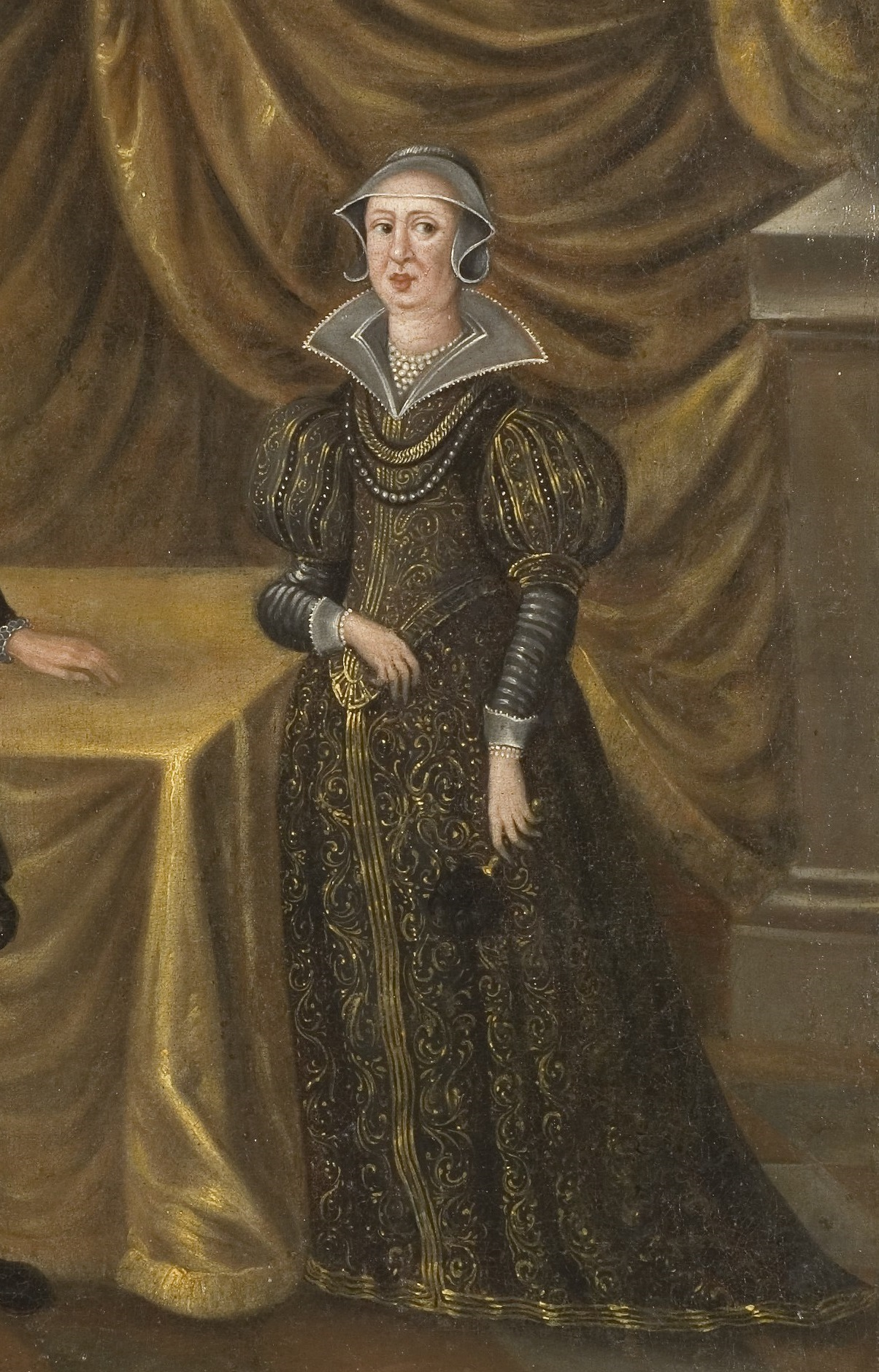
- Catherine around 1520

Duchess consort of Saxe-Lauenburg
- Tenure: 20 November 1509 – 1 August 1543
- Born: 1488
- Died: 29 June 1563 (aged 74–75); Neuhaus upon Elbe
- Spouse: Magnus I, Duke of Saxe-Lauenburg
- Issue: Francis I, Duke of Saxe-Lauenburg; Dorothea, Queen of Denmark and Norway; Catherine, Queen of Sweden; Clara, Duchess of Brunswick-Gifhorn; Sophie, Countess of Oldenburg and Delmenhorst; Ursula, Duchess of Mecklenburg-Scherwin
- House: House of Welf (by birth); House of Ascania (by marriage)
- Father: Henry IV, Duke of Brunswick-Lüneburg
- Mother: Catherine of Pomerania

Catherine of Brunswick-Wolfenbüttel (1488 – 29 June 1563, Neuhaus upon Elbe) was a member of the house of Welf and a Princess of Brunswick-Wolfenbüttel and by marriage Duchess of Saxe-Lauenburg.

== Life ==
Catherine was a daughter of the Duke Henry IV of Brunswick-Lüneburg (1463–1514) from his marriage to Catherine of Pomerania (1465–1526), daughter of the Duke Erich II of Pomerania.

She married on 20 November 1509 in Wolfenbüttel Duke Magnus I of Saxe-Lauenburg (1470–1543). Her father summoned the Parliament in 1509 to collect a lady tax, because he found himself unable to pay the dowry alone. Only after long negotiations, did the Parliament grant three rounds of real estate tax, to generate for money for a dowry and jewels for the princess.

Catherine was a strict Catholic with close ties to her relative in Brunswick kin. This induced Gustav I of Sweden, to marry her daughter, in an attempt to prevent the Catholic German princes from supporting of King Christian II of Denmark.

At the marriage of her eldest son, she entered into negotiations with his later mother-in-law Catherine of Mecklenburg, without the knowledge and to the detriment of the Wettin family head John Frederick of Saxony.

== Offspring ==
From her marriage, Catherine had six children:

- Francis I (1510–1581), Duke of Saxe-Lauenburg

married in 1540 Sibylle of Saxony (1515–1592)

- Dorothea (1511–1571)

married in 1525 King Christian III of Denmark and Norway (1503–1559)

- Catherine (1513–1535)

married in 1531 King Gustav I Vasa of Sweden (1496–1560)

- Clara (1518–1576)

married in 1547 Duke Francis of Braunschweig-Gifhorn (1508–1549)

- Sophie of Saxe-Lauenburg (1521–1571)

married in 1537 Anthony I, Count of Oldenburg and Delmenhorst (1505–1573)

- Ursula of Saxe-Lauenburg (1523–1577)

married in 1551 Duke Heinrich V of Mecklenburg (1479–1552)

== Royal descendants ==
- The current reigning monarchs King Charles III of the United Kingdom, King Carl XVI Gustaf of Sweden, King Felipe VI of Spain, King Harald V of Norway, King Willem-Alexander of the Netherlands, King Frederik X of Denmark, King Philippe of Belgium and Grand Duke Henri of Luxembourg are all her direct-line descendants.

== Footnotes ==
Preceded by Dorothea of Brandenburg	Duchess of Saxe-Lauenburg; 1509–1543	Succeeded by Sybille of Saxony
