= Catherine of Saxony, Electress of Brandenburg =

Catherine of Saxony
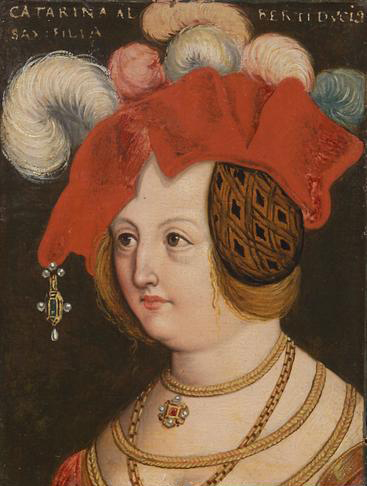

Electress consort of Brandenburg
- Tenure: 11 June 1441 – 10 February 1471
- Born: 1421
- Died: 23 August 1476; Berlin
- Spouse: Frederick II, Elector of Brandenburg (m. 1441; died 1471)
- Issue: Dorothea of Brandenburg, Duchess of Saxe-Lauenburg; Margaret of Brandenburg; Johan of Brandenburg
- House: Wettin
- Father: Frederick I, Elector of Saxony
- Mother: Catherine of Brunswick-Lüneburg

Catherine of Saxony (1421 – 23 August 1476) was a princess of Saxony by birth and Electress of Brandenburg by marriage to Frederick II, Elector of Brandenburg.

== Life ==
Catherine was a daughter of the Elector Frederick I of Saxony (1370–1428) from his marriage to Catherine of Brunswick-Lüneburg (1395–1442), daughter of Duke Henry I, Duke of Brunswick-Lüneburg.

On 11 June 1441 Catherine married Elector Frederick II of Brandenburg (1413–1471) in Wittenberg. Frederick had earlier asked for Catherine's hand unsuccessfully. The promise of marriage was finally made as part of a contract that settled the conflict between Brandenburg and Saxony over the ownership of Lusatia and sealed an alliance between the two countries. The marriage turned out to be an unhappy one. Frederick had numerous affairs, and his son Erasmus was born out of wedlock.

The last years of their marriage the couple spent entirely separate, with Frederick living in Franconia and Catherine living in the Mark Brandenburg.

== Issue ==
Catherine had three children with Frederick:

- Dorothea (1446–1519)

married in 1464 Duke John V of Saxe-Lauenburg (also counted IV; 1439-1507)

- Margaret (born: 1449 or 1450; died: 1489)

married in 1477 Duke Bogislaw X of Pomerania (1454–1523)

- John (c. 1452–1454)

== References and sources ==
- Karl Florentin Leidenfrost: Churfürst Friedrich II und seine Brüder, Herzog Sigismund und Herzog Wilhelm von Sachsen, oder Geschichte Sachsens vom Jahr 1428–1440, written invitation to celebrate William day, 30 October 1827, Carl Schlotter, Jena, 1827, p. 68.
- Andreas Tacke: Wir wollen der Liebe Raum geben. Konkubinate geistlicher und weltlicher Fürsten um 1500. Wallstein, Göttingen 2006, ISBN 3-8353-0052-0, p. 19.

Catherine of Saxony, Electress of Brandenburg House of Wettin Born: 1421 Died: 23 August 1476
German nobility
Vacant Title last held by Elisabeth of Bavaria	Electress consort of Brandenburg; 11 June 1441 – 1470	Vacant Title next held by Anna of Saxony
