= Sophie of Pomerania, Duchess of Pomerania =

Sophia of Pomerania-Stolp
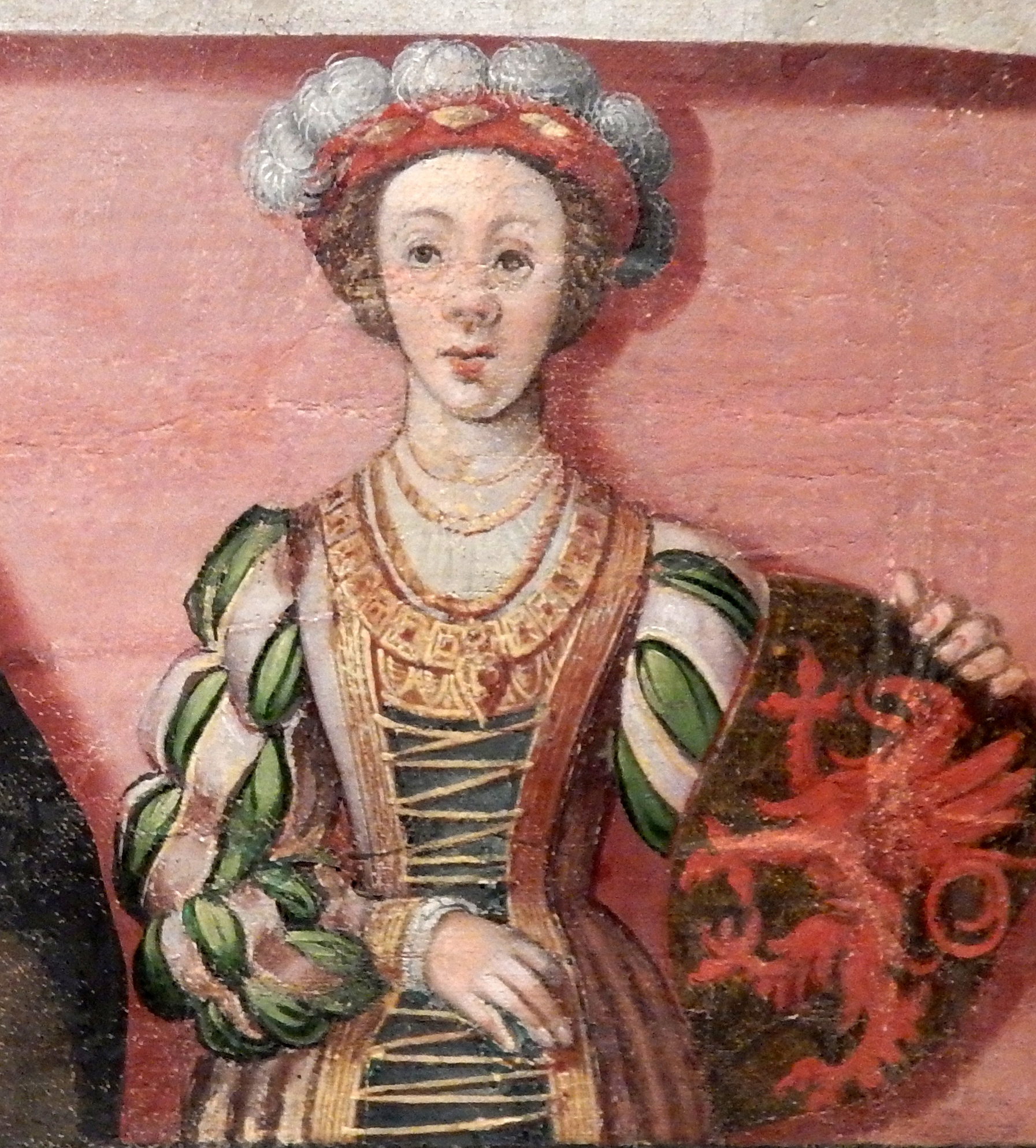
- Born: 1435
- Died: 24 August 1497 (aged 61–62)
- Noble family: House of Griffin
- Spouse: Eric II, Duke of Pomerania
- Father: Bogislaw IX, Duke of Pomerania
- Mother: Maria of Masovia

Sophia of Pomerania-Stolp (1435 – 24 August 1497), was a Duchess of Pomerania by birth, and married to Eric II, Duke of Pomerania.

Sophia was the daughter of Bogislaw IX, Duke of Pomerania and Maria of Masovia. In 1446, her father died and was succeeded by his cousin, Eric of Pomerania, former King of Denmark, Norway and Sweden. Sophia became the heir of Eric of Pomerania's private fortune.

In 1451, Sophia was married to Eric of Pomerania-Wolgast, making her spouse the heir of Eric of Pomerania's territories, while Sophia remained the heir of Eric of Pomerania's private fortune. At the death of Eric of Pomerania in 1459, Sophia's husband united Pomerania through the inheritance of Pomerania-Stolp and Pomerania-Rügenwalde by his marriage, while Sophia became the sole possessor of the vast fortune brought by Eric of Pomerania from his former kingdoms in Scandinavia, as well as the wealth he had acquired by his piracy activity on Gotland.

As Eric refused to allow Sophia any of the political power over the territories he acquired through her, which she felt she was entitled to, the couple separated. Sophia moved to Rügenwalde Castle with her children and her lover, Hans of Maszerski. In 1470, she refused to finance her husband's war with Brandenburg. She was widowed in 1474.

According to an old legend, she was to have poisoned her sons Wratislaw and Casimir, but when she tried to do the same to her son Bogislaw using a poisoned sandwich, he was warned by his jester. The sandwich was given to a dog, who died, after which Sophia was to have fled to Danzig.

== Issue ==
1. Bogislaw X (1454–1523)
2. Casimir (ca. 1455–1474)
3. Wartislaw (after 1465–1475)
4. Barnim (after 1465–1474)
5. Elisabeth (d. 1516), prioress of Verchen Nunnery
6. Sophie (1460–1504), ∞ Duke Magnus II of Mecklenburg-Schwerin and -Güstrow (1441–1503)
7. Margaret (d. 1526), ∞ Duke Balthasar of Mecklenburg (1451–1507), administrator of the prince-bishoprics of Hildesheim and Schwerin
8. Catherine (ca. 1465–1526), ∞ Duke Henry IV of Brunswick and Lunenburg (1463–1514), Prince of Wolfenbüttel
9. Mary (d. 1512), abbess of Wollin Nunnery
