= Eric II of Pomerania =

Duke of Pomerania-Wolgast from 1457 to 1474

Eric II
- Born: between 1418 and 1425
- Died: 5 July 1474; Wolgast
- Noble family: House of Griffin
- Spouse: Sophia of Pomerania-Stolp
- Issue Detail: Bogislaw X; Sophie; Catherine
- Father: Wartislaw IX, Duke of Pomerania
- Mother: Sophia of Saxe-Lauenburg

Eric II or Erich II (between 1418 and 1425 – 5 July 1474) was a member of the House of Pomerania (also known as the Griffins) and was the ruling Duke of Pomerania-Wolgast from 1457 to 1474. He was the son of Wartislaw IX of Pomerania-Wolgast and Sophia, daughter of Eric IV of Saxe-Lauenburg.

== Life ==
In 1451, Wartislaw IX arranged his son's marriage to Sophia, daughter of Bogislaw IX of Pomerania-Stolp and heiress of Eric I of Pomerania-Stolp, who had also been king of the Kalmar Union. The marriage of these distant relatives granted Eric II access to Eric I's lands in Farther Pomerania. Also, Eric I arranged the Lauenburg-Bütow Land at the Pomerelian border to be granted by the Polish king to Eric II on 3 January 1455 as a reward for aiding Poland in her struggles with the Teutonic Knights.

In 1456, Eric took over Maszewo Land in Farther Pomerania, despite Wassow being not included in his share of Pomerania. This led to conflicts with Otto III, Duke of Pomerania-Stettin and even Eric I. Even though the Pomeranian cities were able to mediate negotiations between the dukes which led to a compromise on 16 January 1457 at Rügenwalde, Eric lost the support of the other Pomeranian dukes with this action.

In August 1457, Eric was hunting in the forests near Horst, belonging not to his lands, but to the Hanseatic city of Greifswald. In further disrespect of the city's rights he ordered local peasants to aid him. Greifswald's mayor Heinrich Rubenow led the burghers of Greifswald and Stralsund in an attempt to arrest Eric. Although the burghers captured his guards, Eric managed to escape. Yet, by now he was not only opposed by his co-ruling Pomeranian dukes, but also by the Pomeranian cities.

After the death of his father, Wartislaw IX, later in 1457, Eric received Pomerania-Wolgast together with his younger brother, Wartislaw X. They split the duchy with Wartislaw X receiving the principality of Rügen (with Rügen, Barth, Tribsees and Grimmen) while Eric received the eastern parts. Upon Eric I's death, in 1459 Eric II gained Pomerania-Stolp and Pomerania-Rügenwalde due to the claims of his wife. Despite being a partitioned duchy in reality, Pomerania was granted to the dukes as one fief to be co-ruled, which meant that several issues had to be acted upon in common. Because Eric did not respect Wartislaw X's rights as a co-ruler, Wartislaw sought for an alliance with the Margraviate of Brandenburg on 6 September 1459 in Angermünde. He pawned the area north of the Brandenburgian Uckermark to Hohenzollern margrave Frederick II and in return became assured of military protection against his brother.

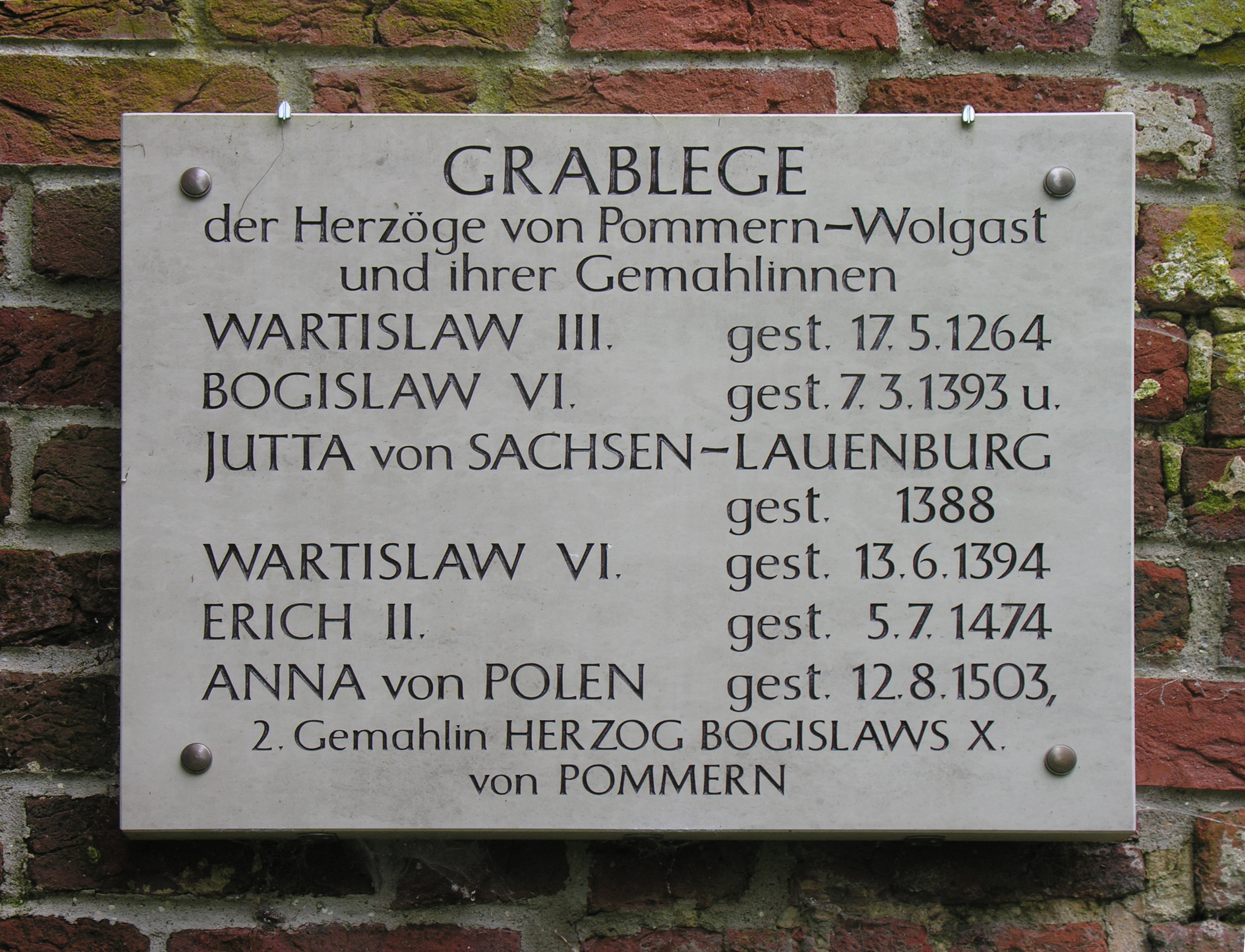
burial site of Eric II in Eldena Abbey (Greifswald, Western Pomerania)

In 1464, Eric's cousin Otto III of Pomerania-Stettin died of the Black Death, leaving both Eric and Wartislaw as well as Brandenburg's Frederick II with claims for inheritance. In 1466 Eric II and Wartislaw X were granted liens by the elector of Brandenburg at Soldin. However the contract was not fulfilled and it came to military intervention. Aware that he would not withstand Brandenburg without allies, Eric sought to settle the conflict by allying with Poland and in 1470 invaded the Brandenburg Neumark. The Brandenburgers had their longtime claims to Pomerania re-verified by emperor Frederick III. The emperor ordered Erich II and Wartislaw X to recognize the suzerainty of Brandenburg. Mecklenburg's Duke Henry took a mediator role and the Mecklenburgian army moved eastward following the Tollense River, a Brandenburgian army advanced to the North from the Uckermark following the Randow River. The campaigns were ended by the Peace of Prenzlau of 31 May 1472 and the Pomeranian dukes gave the pledge of allegiance to the elector. Brandenburg was again granted the right of inheritance of Pomerania upon the extinction of the House of Pomerania.

Eric died in 1474 of a plague-like disease. He was buried in Eldena Abbey near Greifswald and was succeeded by his son Bogislaw X.

== Marriage and issue ==
Eric II married Sophia of Pomerania-Stolp. With his wife, he had nine children:

1. Bogislaw X (1454–1523)
2. Casimir (ca. 1455–1474)
3. Wartislaw (after 1465–1475)
4. Barnim (after 1465–1474)
5. Elisabeth (d. 1516), prioress of Verchen Nunnery
6. Sophie (1460–1504), ∞ Duke Magnus II of Mecklenburg-Schwerin and -Güstrow (1441–1503)
7. Margaret (d. 1526), ∞ Duke Balthasar of Mecklenburg (1451–1507), administrator of the prince-bishoprics of Hildesheim and Schwerin
8. Catherine (ca. 1465–1526), ∞ Duke Henry IV of Brunswick and Lunenburg (1463–1514), Prince of Wolfenbüttel
9. Mary (d. 1512), abbess of Wollin Nunnery

== Ancestors ==
Ancestors of Eric II of Pomerania

8. Wartislaw VI, Duke of Pomerania
4. Barnim VI, Duke of Pomerania
9. Anne of Mecklenburg-Stargard
2. Wartislaw IX, Duke of Pomerania
10. Frederick V, Burgrave of Nuremberg
5. Veronica of Hohenzollern
11. Elisabeth of Meissen
1. Eric, Duke of Pomerania
12. Eric II, Duke of Saxe-Lauenburg
6. Eric IV, Duke of Saxe-Lauenburg
13. Agnes of Holstein-Plön
3. Sophia of Saxe-Lauenburg
14. Magnus II, Duke of Brunswick-Lüneburg
7. Sophia of Brunswick-Wolfenbüttel
15. Catherine of Anhalt-Bernburg

== See also ==
- List of Pomeranian duchies and dukes
- History of Pomerania
- Duchy of Pomerania
- House of Pomerania

== Sources ==
- Gottfried von Bülow (1877). "Erich II., Herzog von Pommern-Wolgast" . Allgemeine Deutsche Biographie (in German). Vol. 6. Leipzig: Duncker & Humblot. pp. 207–211.

Eric II of Pomerania House of Griffins Born: before 1425 Died: 5 July 1474
Preceded by Wartislaw IX	Duke of Pomerania-Wolgast; 1457–1474	Succeeded by Bogislaw X
Preceded by Eric I	Duke of Pomerania-Stolp; 1459–1474	Succeeded by Bogislaw X
Preceded by Otto III	Duke of Pomerania-Stettin; 1464–1474	Succeeded by Bogislaw X
