= Frederick II of Brandenburg =

Elector of Brandenburg from 1440 to 1470

Frederick II
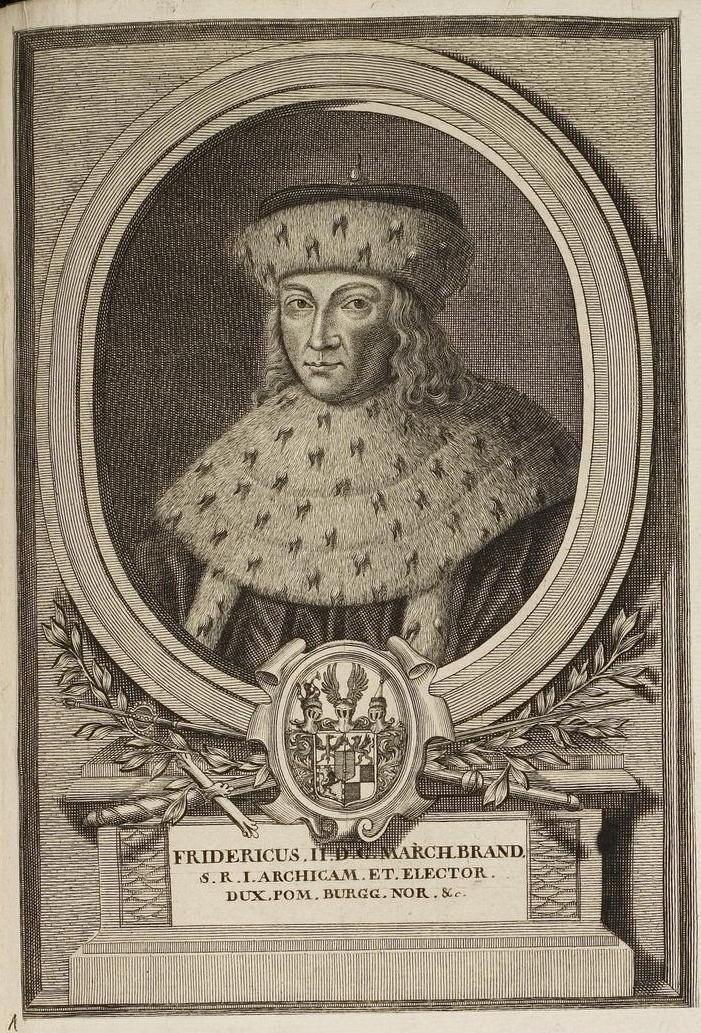
- Posthumous engraving of Frederick II, 16th century

Elector of Brandenburg
- Reign: 20 September 1440 – 10 February 1471
- Predecessor: Frederick I
- Successor: Albert III Achilles
- Born: 19 November 1413; Tangermünde castle, Margraviate of Brandenburg
- Died: 10 February 1471 (aged 57); Neustadt an der Aisch, Bavaria
- Spouse: Catherine of Saxony (m. 1441)
- Issue: Dorothea of Brandenburg, Duchess of Saxe-Lauenburg; Margaret of Brandenburg; Johan of Brandenburg
- House: Hohenzollern
- Father: Frederick I, Elector of Brandenburg
- Mother: Elisabeth of Bavaria

Frederick II of Brandenburg (German: Friedrich II.) (19 November 1413 – 10 February 1471), nicknamed "the Iron" (der Eiserne) and sometimes "Irontooth" (Eisenzahn), was a Prince-elector of the Margraviate of Brandenburg from 1440 until his abdication in 1470, and was a member of the House of Hohenzollern.

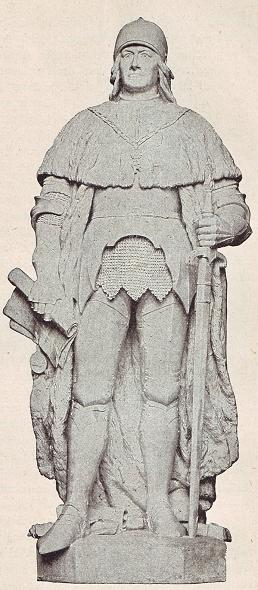
Statue by Alexander Calandrelli, 1898, former Siegesallee, Berlin

== Biography ==
Frederick II was born at Tangermünde Castle (German: Burg Tangermünde), when Tangermünde was within the Margraviate of Brandenburg, to Frederick I, Brandenburg's first Hohenzollern ruler, and his wife Elizabeth, daughter of Frederick, Duke of Bavaria-Landshut, and Maddalena Visconti. The latter was a daughter of Bernabò Visconti and Beatrice della Scala. As the second son, his brothers included John the Alchemist and Albert Achilles, both of whom also ruled Brandenburg as margraves.

In 1421, at age 8, Frederick was betrothed to Hedwig Jagiellon, but she died on 8 December 1431, before the marriage could take place.

When Frederick I retired in 1437, he compensated his incapable eldest son John with the Principality of Bayreuth while Frederick II assumed the government of Brandenburg. Unlike his father, he turned away from imperial politics and concentrated on his efforts to pacify the nobility and towns of the electorate. Quarrels with the city of Berlin began in 1440 with his plans to build a new residence on the Cölln island of the Spree river. In 1448 the Berliner Unwille (indignation) against the cession of the city's territory for an electoral stronghold culminated in open revolt, when the citizens flooded the excavation of the future Stadtschloss. Nevertheless, Frederick II prevailed, had the palace built and the city's rights decisively curtailed.

In 1453, Frederick II, in his position as the Margrave of Brandenburg, was sent a letter from Rhodes, penned by the Grand Master of the Knights of St John, notifying him of the Fall of Constantinople and requesting he send them support so as to allow them to continue to combat the Turkish threat. His response is unknown.

In 1454 and 1455, he concluded the Treaties of Cölln and Mewe and thereby re-gained the Neumark (New March) from the Teutonic Order state. Weary of the long struggle with the Duchy of Pomerania, he abdicated in 1470 in favour of his younger brother Albert Achilles, he retired to the Bayreuth Principality and died one year later in Neustadt an der Aisch.

== Family and children ==
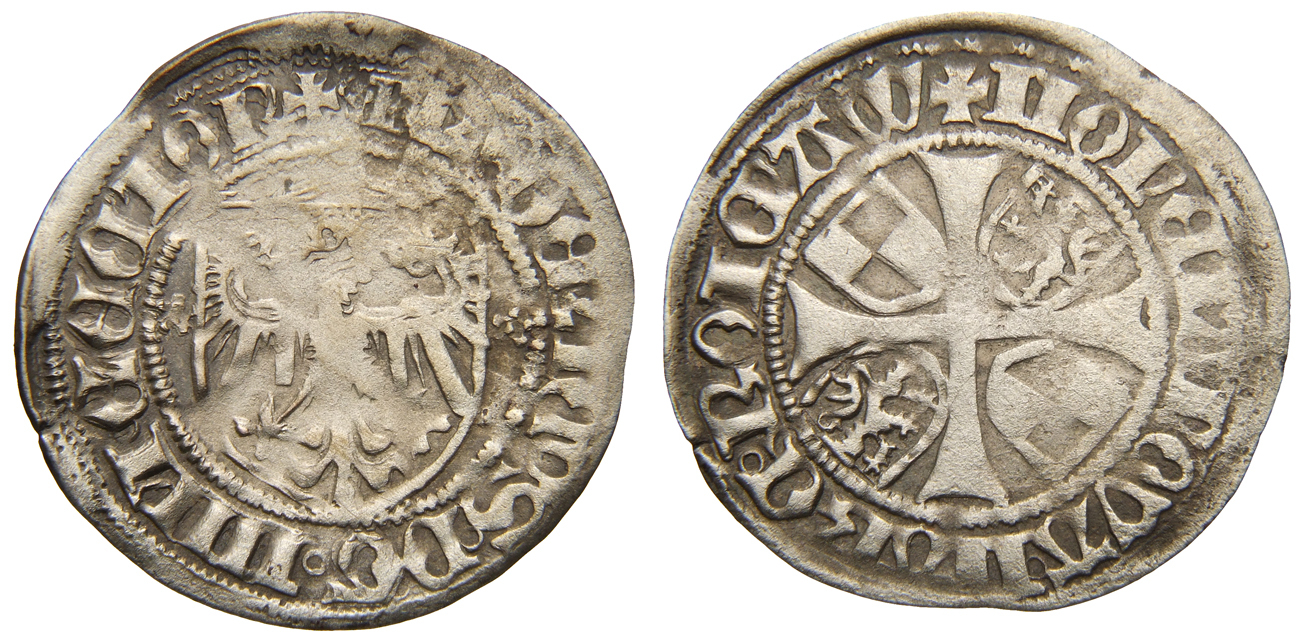
Coin minted during the reign of Frederick II, c. 1463-70

On 11 June 1441, Frederick II married Catherine of Saxony (1421 – 23 August 1476), a daughter of Elector Frederick I of Saxony and Katharina of Brunswick-Lüneburg. They had three children (and Frederick had one bastard):

- Dorothea of Brandenburg (c. 1446 – March, 1519), married Duke John V of Saxe-Lauenburg on 12 February 1464.
- Margaret of Brandenburg (c. 1450 – 1489), married Bogislaw X, Duke of Pomerania.
- Johan of Brandenburg (December 23, 14{06-16}/ c. 1452 - 1454)
- Erasmus von Brandenburg (c. 1452 - 1465).

== Ancestors ==
Ancestors of Frederick II of Brandenburg

8. John II, Burgrave of Nuremberg
4. Frederick V, Burgrave of Nuremberg
9. Elisabeth of Henneberg-Schleusingen
2. Frederick I, Elector of Brandenburg
10. Frederick II, Margrave of Meissen
5. Elisabeth of Meissen
11. Mathilde of Bavaria
1. Frederick II, Elector of Brandenburg
12. Stephen II, Duke of Bavaria
6. Frederick of Bavaria-Landshut
13. Elisabeth of Sicily
3. Elisabeth of Bavaria-Landshut
14. Bernabò Visconti
7. Maddalena Visconti
15. Beatrice Regina della Scala

Frederick II of Brandenburg House of Hohenzollern Born: 19 November 1413 Died: 10 February 1471
Regnal titles
Preceded by Frederick I	Elector of Brandenburg; 1440–1470	Succeeded by Albert III Achilles
