= Swantibor V of Pomerania =

- Born: 1454
- Died: 1464 (aged 9–10)
- Noble family: House of Griffin
- Father: Wartislaw X, Duke of Pomerania
- Mother: Elisabeth of Brandenburg

Swantibor V (1454–1464) was a prince of Pomerania from the House of Griffins.

== Life ==
Swantibor was the eldest son of Duke Wartislaw X of Pomerania-Wolgast and his wife Elisabeth of Brandenburg. He was born around 1454. In the summer semester of 1462, when he was about eight years old, he was enrolled at the University of Greifswald. This was shortly after a long-running dispute had been settled between the city of Greifswald and the Dukes Wartislaw X and his brother Eric II. The university had been founded by Swantbor's grandfather, Wartislaw IX; Swantibor was the first member of the House of Griffins to be enrolled here. In the winter semester of 1462–1463, Swantibor was elected rector of the university, to honor his grandfather.

In 1464, Swantibor died of the plague. His younger brother Ertmar died at the same time. Their father had no other children; their mother had a son, Duke Otto III from an earlier marriage to Duke Joachim the Younger. However, Otto III was also killed by the plague in 1464.

== Ancestors ==
Ancestors of Swantibor V of Pomerania

8. Barnim VI, Duke of Pomerania
4. Wartislaw IX, Duke of Pomerania
9. Veronica of Hohenzollern
2. Wartislaw X, Duke of Pomerania
10. Eric IV, Duke of Saxe-Lauenburg
5. Sophia of Saxe-Lauenburg
11. Sophia of Brunswick-Wolfenbüttel
1. Swantibor V, Duke of Pomerania
12. Frederick I, Elector of Brandenburg
6. John, Margrave of Brandenburg-Kulmbach
13. Elisabeth of Bavaria-Landshut
3. Elisabeth of Brandenburg
14. Rudolf III, Duke of Saxe-Wittenberg
7. Barbara of Saxe-Wittenberg
15. Barbara of Legnica

== Numeral ==
The assignment of numerals to the Dukes in the House of Griffins had always been complicated. Confusion is caused by different authors assigning different numerals to the dukes. The modern approach is to assign numerals only to members of the House of Griffins who reached adulthood. Under this approach, Swantibor would not be assigned a numeral. Older sources, however, assigned numerals to all males members of the house. Under that approach, this Swantibor would be Swantibor V.

== See also ==
- List of Pomeranian duchies and dukes
