= Otto III of Pomerania =

Otto III, Duke of Pomerania
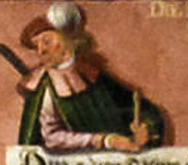
- Born: 29 May 1444
- Died: 7 September 1464 (aged 20)
- Buried: Otten Church in Stettin
- Noble family: House of Griffin
- Father: Joachim, Duke of Pomerania
- Mother: Elizabeth of Brandenburg

Otto III, Duke of Pomerania (29 May 1444 – 7 September 1464) was a member of the House of Griffin and a Duke of Pomerania-Stettin.

== Life ==
Otto III was the only son of Duke Joachim I "the Younger" of Pomerania, ruler of Pomerania-Stettin, and his wife Elizabeth of Brandenburg. After his father died in 1451, his mother married again in 1453, with Duke Wartislaw X of Pomerania-Wolgast. The young Otto, heir of Pomerania-Stettin, was educated at the court of the Elector Frederick II of Brandenburg (1413–1471), his uncle and guardian.

When Duke Wartislaw IX of Pomerania-Wolgast died in 1457, his will named not only his sons Eric II and Wartislaw X, Otto's stepfather, as heir, but also young Otto III. An inheritance dispute arose, is which Frederick II supported Otto, and also used the opportunity to meddle in the affairs of Pomerania.

In 1460, Otto III was declared an adult, at the request of the Estates of Pomerania. This ended the regency by Brandenburg; instead the 15-year-old Otto III took up government himself. The most important offices in his court were occupied by Brandenburg-minded people. The disputes about the inheritance of Warislaw IX were settled in 1463, with Otto receiving Pomerania-Stargard, the western part of Pomerania.

Otto died of the plague on 7 September 1464 and was buried in the Otten Church in Stettin. He was unmarried and had no children. With his death, the Pomerania-Stettin line of the House of Griffins died out. It had begun with Duke Otto I (c. 1279-1344).

Otto's death triggered the Stettin War of Succession. Elector Frederick II claimed that Pomerania-Stettin was now a completed fief and that it should fall back to Brandenburg. The Dukes in Wolgast claimed that it was a part of Pomerania and should fall to the surviving line of the House of Griffins.

According to legend, the dispute began when Otto was buried. Mayor Albert Glinde of Stettin is said to have put Otto's helmet and shield in his grave, to indicate the end of his dynasty. A gentleman from Eickstädt then jumped into the grave and took the helmet and shield out again, with the words "We still have hereditary, born rulers, the Dukes in Wolgast. The helmet and shield belong to them."

== Ancestors ==
Ancestors of Otto III of Pomerania

16. Barnim III, Duke of Pomerania
8. Swantibor III, Duke of Pomerania
17. Agnes of Brunswick-Grubenhagen
4. Casimir V, Duke of Pomerania
18. Albert of Nuremberg
9. Anna of Nuremberg
19. Margaret of Carinthia
2. Joachim I, Duke of Pomerania
20. Magnus II, Duke of Brunswick-Lüneburg
10. Bernard I, Duke of Brunswick-Lüneburg
21. Catherine of Anhalt-Bernburg
5. Catherine of Brunswick-Lüneburg
22. Wenceslas I, Duke of Saxe-Wittenberg
11. Margaret of Saxe-Wittenberg
23. Cecilia of Carrara
1. Otto III, Duke of Pomerania
24. Frederick V, Burgrave of Nuremberg
12. Frederick I, Elector of Brandenburg
25. Elisabeth of Meissen
6. John, Margrave of Brandenburg-Kulmbach
26. Frederick, Duke of Bavaria
13. Elisabeth of Bavaria-Landshut
27. Maddalena Visconti
3. Elisabeth of Brandenburg
28. Wenceslas I, Duke of Saxe-Wittenberg (= 22)
14. Rudolf III, Duke of Saxe-Wittenberg
29. Cecilia of Carrara (= 23)
7. Barbara of Saxe-Wittenberg
30. Rupert I of Legnica
15. Barbara of Legnica
31. Hedwig of Sagan

== See also ==
- List of Pomeranian duchies and dukes

Otto III of Pomerania House of Griffins Born: 29 May 1444 7 September
Preceded by Joachim I	Duke of Pomerania-Stettin; 1451-1464	Succeeded by Eric II
