= Pomerania-Wolgast-Stolp =

Former monarchy in Europe

Duchy of Pomerania-Wolgast-Stolp (Teil-)Herzogtum Pommern-Wolgast-Stolp (German) Księstwo wołogosko-słupskie (Polish) Ducatus Wolgastensis et Stolpensis (Latin)
- 1532–1625
- Coat of arms

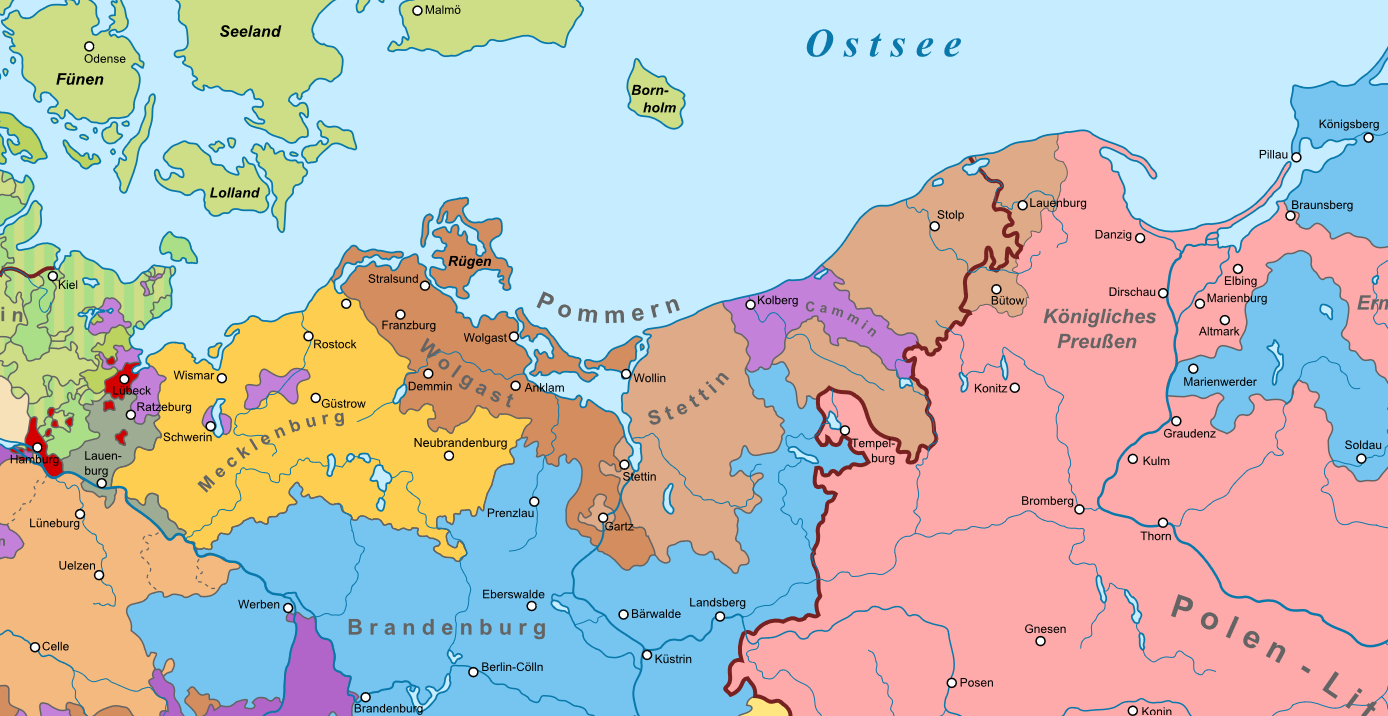
- Pomerania-Wologast-Stolp in 1618.
- Status: State of the Holy Roman Empire
- Capital: Wolgast
- Religion: Roman Catholic
- Government: Feudal duchy
- Duke
  - 1532–1560 (first): Philip I
  - 1592–1625 (last): Philipp Julius
- Historical era: Late Middle Ages; Early modern period
  - Partition of the Duchy of Pomerania: 21 November 1532
  - Unification of the Duchy of Pomerania: 1625
Preceded by	Succeeded by
Duchy of Pomerania	Duchy of Pomerania; Pomerania-Barth
- Today part of: Poland; Germany

The Duchy of Wolgast-Stolp, (Note: German: (Teil-)Herzogtum Pommern-Wolgast-Stolp) also known as the Duchy of Wolgast and Stolp, and the Duchy of Wołogoszcz and Słupsk, (Note: Polish: Księstwo wołogosko-słupskie ; Latin: Ducatus Wolgastensis et Stolpensis) was a feudal duchy in Western Pomerania within the Holy Roman Empire. Its capital was Wolgast. It was ruled by the Griffin dynasty. It existed in the eras of Late Middle Ages and the Early modern period, from 1532 to 1625.

The state was formed on 21 November 1532, in the partition of the Duchy of Pomerania, with duke Philip I, as its first ruler. It existed until 1625, when, under the rule of duke Bogislaw XIV, it was incorporated into the unified Duchy of Pomerania.

== List of rulers ==
- Philip I (1532–1560)
- Bogislaw XIII, Ernst Ludwig, John Frederick, and Barnim X (1567–1569)
- Ernst Ludwig (1569–1592)
- Philipp Julius (1592–1625)

== See also ==
- Pomerania-Wolgast
- Pomerania-Stolp
- Pomerania-Schlawe

== Citations ==
=== Bibliography ===
- Rodowód książąt pomorskich by E. Rymar. Szczecin. Pomeranian Library. 2005. ISBN 83-87879-50-9, OCLC 69296056. (Polish)
- Encyklopedia Szczecina, vol. 1. A-O. Szczecin. University of Szczecin. 1999. p. 336. ISBN 83-87341-45-2.
