= Pomerania-Barth =

Former monarchy in Europe

Duchy of Pomerania-Barth Herzogtum Pommern-Barth (German) Księstwo bardowskie (Polish)
- 1376–1478; 1569–1625
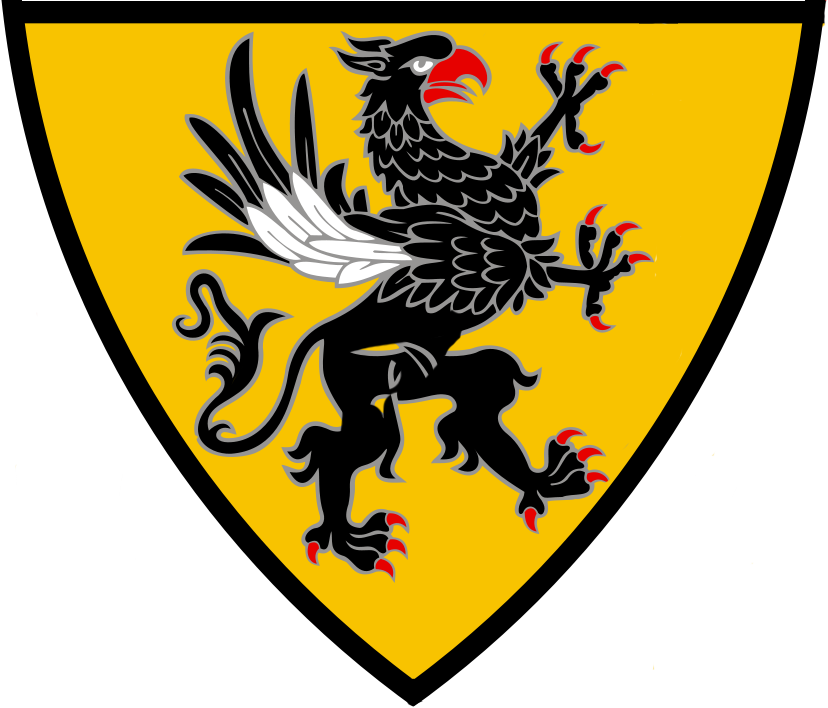
- Coat of arms
- Status: State of the Holy Roman Empire
- Capital: Barth
- Religion: Roman Catholic
- Government: Feudal duchy
- Duke
  - 1376–1415 (first): Wartislaw VI
  - 1620–1625 (last): Bogislaw XIV
- Historical era: Middle Ages
  - Separation from Pomerania-Wolgast: 1376
  - Incorporation into Duchy of Pomerania: 1478
  - Separation from Pomerania-Wolgast-Stolp: 1569
  - Incorporation into Duchy of Pomerania: 1625
Preceded by	Succeeded by
Pomerania-Wolgast; Pomerania-Wolgast-Stolp	Duchy of Pomerania
- Today part of: Germany

Duchy of Pomerania-Barth (Note: German: Herzogtum Pommern-Barth; Polish: Księstwo bardowskie; Latin: Ducatus Bardensis) was a feudal duchy of the Holy Roman Empire located in Western Pomerania that existed in the Middle Ages between 1376 and 1478, and between 1569 and 1625. The state consisted of its capital, Barth, and nearby areas. Duchy had separated from Pomerania-Wolgast in 1376 and was incorporated into Duchy of Pomerania in 1478. It was reestablished in 1569 by separation from Pomerania-Wolgast-Stolp and existed until 1625, when it was incorporated into Duchy of Pomerania.

== History ==
After the death in 1325 of Wizlaw III, Prince of Rügen, the last Prince of Rügen, Wizla's nephew, Duke Wartislaw IV, was enfeoffed with the Principality of Rügen by the Danish king, in accordance with the contract of inheritance of 1321. Wartislaw, however, died in 1326 and left three underage sons. Then Duke Henry II of Mecklenburg occupied the Rügen territories of Barth, Grimmen and Loitz, claiming he was the legal heir. This led to the First Rügen War of Succession. The war ended with the Peace of Brudersdorf of 27 June 1328, in which Mecklenburg renounced its claims on Rügen, but retained Barth, Grimsby and Tribsees as security. When the sons of Wartislav IV found themselves unable to pay off the pledged land after 12 years, the Second Rügen War of Succession began, which ended in 1354 with the Peace of Stralsund, in which Barth was awarded to Pomerania-Wolgast.

After the death of son Wartislaw IV's son Barnim IV, Duke of Pomerania in 1365, Pomerania-Barth was divided in 1372 under the Treaty of Anklam. The Eastern part, between the rivers Swine and Łeba, was called Pomerania-Stolp and was initially ruled by Duke Bogislaw V and the Western duchies of Pomerania-Barth, initially ruled by Duke Wartislaw VI and Pomerania-Wolgast, ruled by Duke Bogislaw VI. From 1368/72 until 1451 the island of Rügen was also ruled by the dukes of Pomerania-Barth, albeit temporarily as a secundogeniture.

In 1396, Bogislaw VI died and Wartislaw VI inherited his part of Pomerania. He moved his residence to Wolgast, and therefore his part of Pomerania was known as Pomerania-Wolgast. After his death, his sons ruled Pomerania-Wolgast jointly.

In 1415, Pomerania-Wolgast was again split, with Pomerania-Barth being given to Duke Barnim VIII, who also inherited Rügen from his childless brother Swantibor IV in 1440. In 1451, Barnim VIII himself also died childless, and Pomerania-Barth was once again reunited with Pomerania-Wolgast, under Wartislaw IX.

Wartislaw IX died in 1457 and Pomerania-Wolgast was once again divided. Wartislaw X ruled Pomerania-Barth until 1478. This was the last time Barth served as the capital for a fragment of the Duchy of Pomerania, although later Dukes occasionally visited the city.

From 1569 to 1605 it was the residence of Duke Bogislaw XIII, who was not a ruling duke. I the division treaty of Jasenitz, he had been awarded the district of Barth and the secularized monastery of Neuenkamp. When he became a ruling Duke in Stettin in 1603, he initially kept these possessions, but in 1605, he gave them to his cousin Philip Julius, who he renamed Neuenkamp to Francis Castle, in honor of his father-in-law Duke Francis of Brunswick-Lüneburg. After Philip Julius's death in 1625, Barth Castle served as Wittum for his widow, Agnes of Brandenburg, until she remarried with Francis Charles of Saxe-Lauenburg in 1628.

In 1638, during the Thirty Years' War, Barth Castle and all other ducal possessions were impounded by the Swedish crown, who handed them to the military and the civil service. Barth Castle was given to Field Marshal Lennart Torstensson.

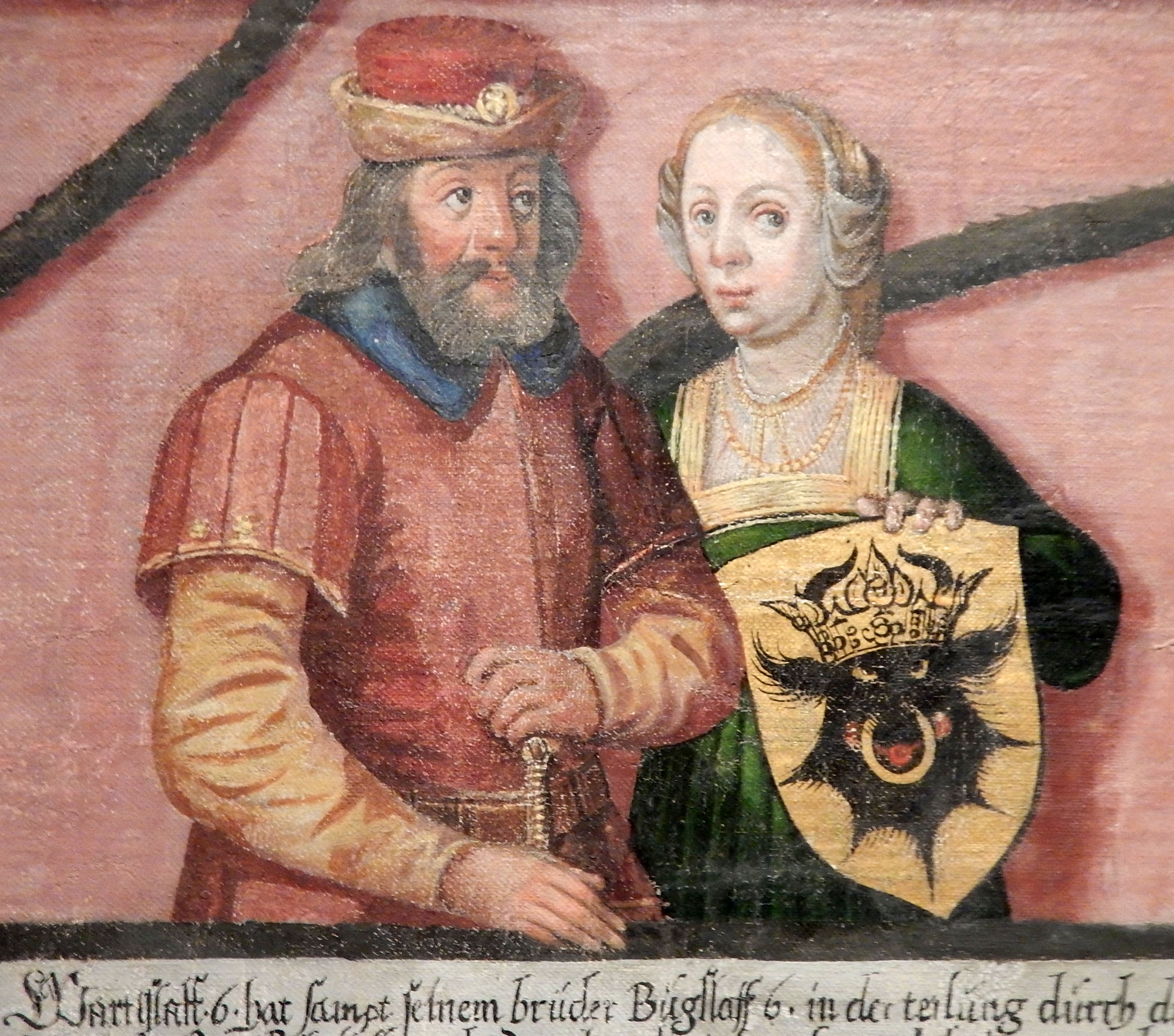
Wartislaw VI (1345–1394), 1st Duke of Pomerania-Barth, with his wife Anne of Mecklenburg-Stargard (on the family tree of the House of Griffins, drawn by Cornelius Krommeny (1598)

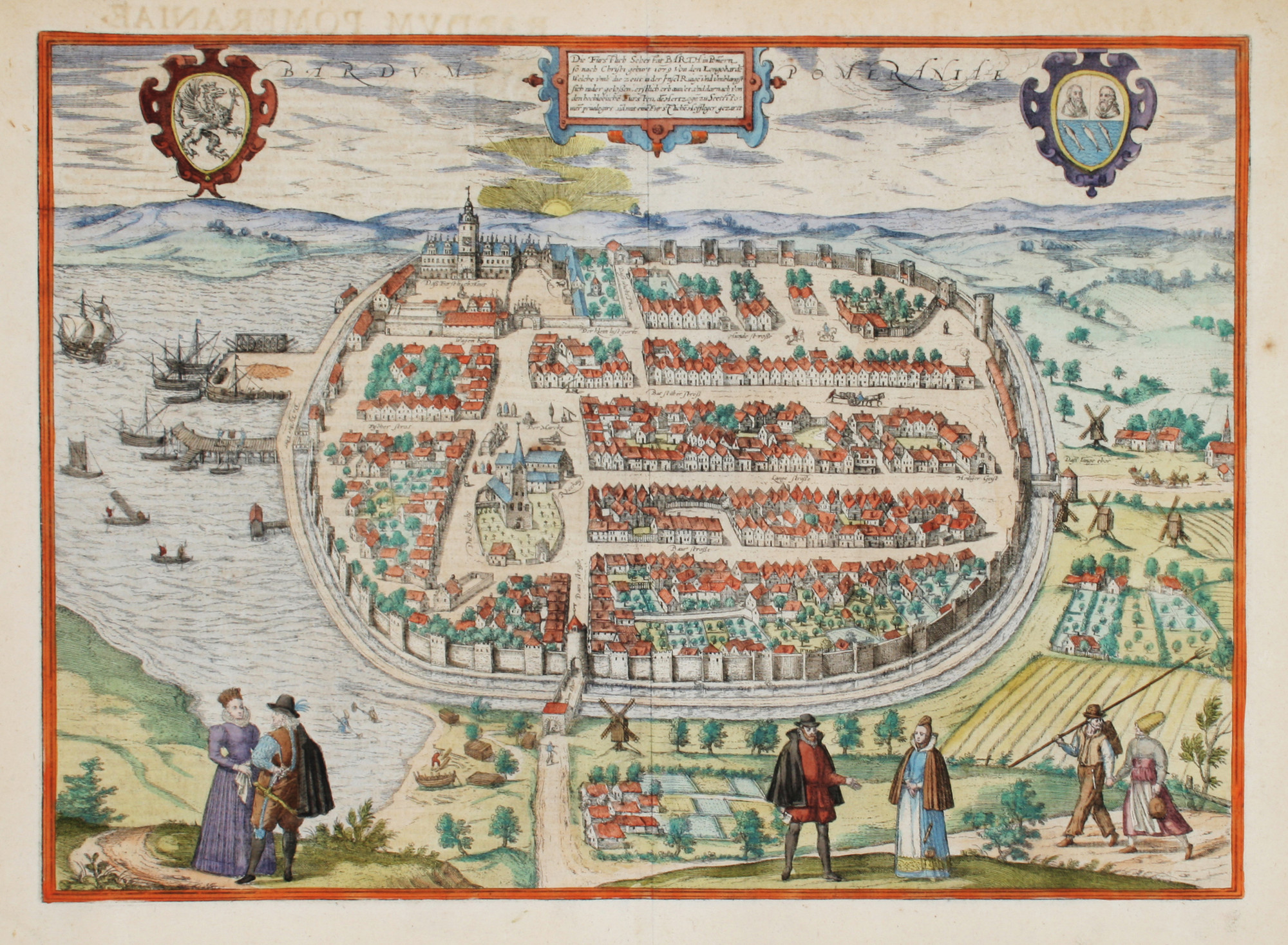
Barth (c. 1590)

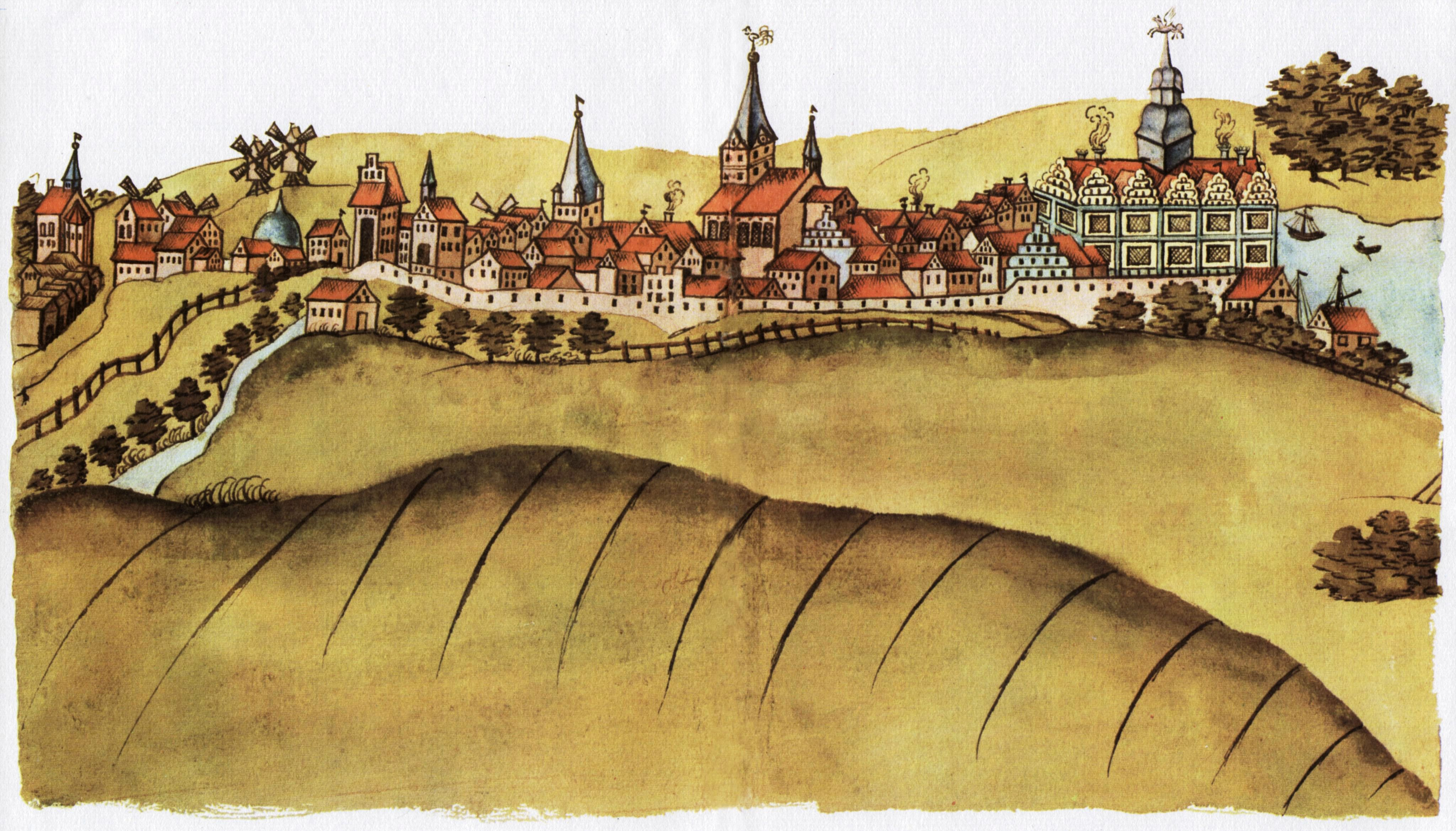
Town and Castle of Barth (c. 1615)

== See also ==
- List of Pomeranian duchies and dukes

== References and sources ==
- Oliver Auge: Die pommerschen Greifen als Fürsten von Rügen und Herzöge von Barth, in: Melanie Ehler, Matthias Müller (eds.): Unter fürstlichem Regiment. Barth als Residenz der pommerschen Herzöge, Lukas Verlag, Berlin, 2005, ISBN 3-936872-55-4, pp. 13–30.
- Hans Branig: Geschichte Pommerns, part 1: Vom Werden des neuzeitlichen Staates bis zum Verlust der staatlichen Selbstständigkeit 1300-1648, Böhlau Verlag, Cologne, 1997, ISBN 3-412-07189-7.
- Häckermann (1875). "Barnim VI. (VIII.)". Allgemeine Deutsche Biographie (in German). Vol. 2. Leipzig: Duncker & Humblot. pp. 77–79.
- Horst-Diether Schroeder: Der Erste Rügische Erbfolgekrieg – Ursachen, Verlauf und Ergebnisse, in Haik Thomas Porada (ed.): Beiträge zur Geschichte Vorpommerns. Die Demminer Kolloquien 1985 – 1994, Thomas Helms Verlag, Schwerin, 1997, ISBN 3-931185-11-7, pp. 129–140.
- Joachim Wächter: Das Fürstentum Rügen – Ein Überblick, in Haik Thomas Porada (ed.): Beiträge zur Geschichte Vorpommerns. Die Demminer Kolloquien 1985 – 1994, Thomas Helms Verlag, Schwerin, 1997, ISBN 3-931185-11-7, pp. 299–313.
