= Elisabeth of Brandenburg, Duchess of Pomerania =

Duchess of Pomerania

Elizabeth of Brandenburg
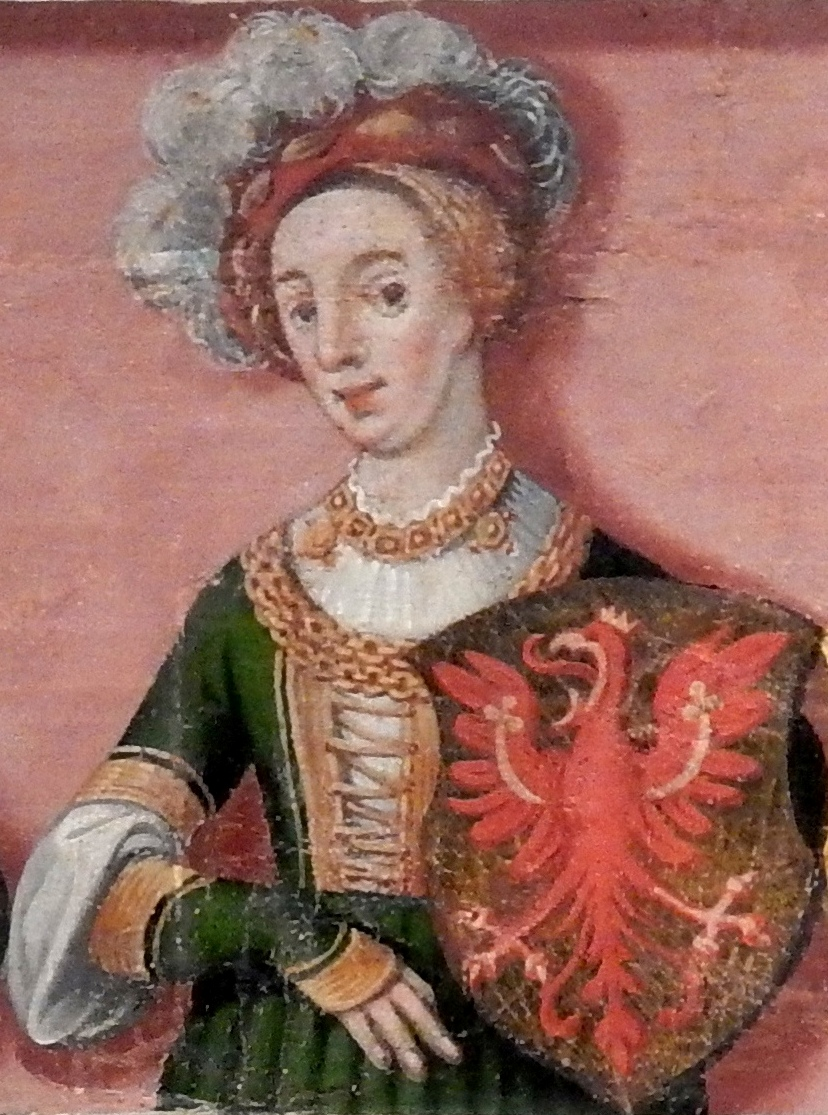
- Born: 1425
- Died: after 13 January 1465
- Noble family: House of Hohenzollern
- Spouses: Joachim I of Pomerania-Stettin; Wartislaw X, Duke of Pomerania-Barth
- Issue: Otto III; Swantibor V Ertmar
- Father: John, Margrave of Brandenburg-Kulmbach
- Mother: Barbara of Saxe-Wittenberg

Elizabeth of Brandenburg (1425 – after 13 January 1465) was a princess of Brandenburg by birth and marriage Duchess of Pomerania.

== Life ==
Elizabeth was a daughter of the Margrave John the Alchemist of Brandenburg-Kulmbach (1406–1464) from his marriage to Barbara (1405–1465), daughter of Duke Rudolf III of Saxe-Wittenberg. Elizabeth's father renounced his rights to the succession in Brandenburg and instead received the Franconian possessions of the House of Hohenzollern. Her sisters were Queen Dorothea of Denmark and Marchioness Barbara of Mantua.

She married on 27 August 1440 with Duke Joachim I of Pomerania-Stettin (1427–1451). The marriage was meant to seal a treaty between Brandenburg and Pomerania. Joachim died of the plague in Szczecin, after eleven years of marriage. He had one son: Otto III of Pomerania-Stettin.

On 5 March 1454, she married her second husband, Duke Wartislaw X of Pomerania-Rügen (1435–1478). In 1464, her father and all three of her sons died. After the death of Otto III, a war erupted between Pomerania and Brandenburg about the inheritance of the Stettin branch of the family.

Her second marriage was a very unhappy one. She felt that her husband had ...planned to kill her, and take her life and limb and, although it would be unchristian and pitiable, revoke her interests and pensions. Because of great distress and poverty, her uncle gave her Lippehne and Berlinchen instead of her father's Arnswalde.

For Frederick, the fate of his niece was the motivation to break off negotiations with Wartislaw about Stettin and push through his claims on Pomerania. After mediation by Duke Henry of Mecklenburg-Stargard, Wartislaw accepted Pomerania as a fief of the Electorate of Brandenburg.

== Issue ==
Elisabeth had a son from her first marriage to Joachim:

- Otto III (1444–1464), Duke of Pomerania-Stettin.

From her second marriage with Wartislaw, she had two sons:

- Swantibor V, Duke of Pomerania (1454–1464)
- Ertmar (1455–1464)

== Ancestry ==
Ancestors of Elisabeth of Brandenburg, Duchess of Pomerania

16. John II, Burgrave of Nuremberg
8. Frederick V, Burgrave of Nuremberg
17. Elisabeth of Henneberg-Schleusingen
4. Frederick I, Elector of Brandenburg
18. Frederick II, Margrave of Meissen
9. Elisabeth of Meissen
19. Mathilde of Bavaria
2. John, Margrave of Brandenburg-Kulmbach
20. Stephen II, Duke of Bavaria
10. Frederick, Duke of Bavaria
21. Elisabeth of Sicily
5. Elisabeth of Bavaria
22. Bernabò Visconti
11. Maddalena Visconti
23. Beatrice Regina della Scala
1. Elisabeth of Brandenburg
24. Rudolf I, Duke of Saxe-Wittenberg
12. Wenceslas I, Duke of Saxe-Wittenberg
25. Agnes of Lindow-Ruppin
6. Rudolf III, Duke of Saxe-Wittenberg
26. Francesco I da Carrara
13. Cecilia di Carrara
27. Fina Buzzacarini
3. Barbara of Saxe-Wittenberg
28. Wenceslaus I, Duke of Legnica
14. Rupert I of Legnica
29. Anna of Cieszyn
7. Barbara of Legnica
30. Henry V of Iron, Duke of Żagań
15. Hedwig of Sagan
31. Anna of Płock

== Sources ==
- Friedrich Wilhelm Barthold: Geschichte von Rügen und Pommern, Band 4, F. Perthes, 1843, p. 289 ff.
