= Barbara of Saxe-Wittenberg =

German noblewoman (1405–1465)

- Margravine of Brandenburg-Kulmbach
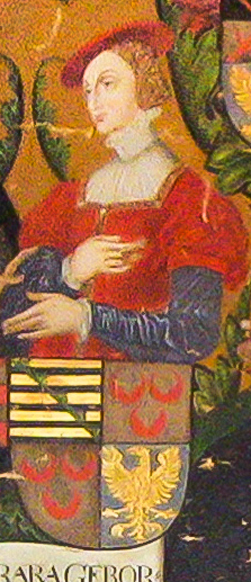
- Born: 1405
- Died: 10 October 1465 (aged 59–60); Bayreuth
- Noble family: Ascania
- Spouse: John, Margrave of Brandenburg-Kulmbach
- Issue: Rudolf of Brandenburg; Barbara Gonzaga, Marchioness of Mantua; Elisabeth, Duchess of Pomerania; Dorothea, Queen of Denmark
- Father: Rudolf III, Duke of Saxe-Wittenberg
- Mother: Barbara of Legnica

Barbara of Saxe-Wittenberg (1405 – 10 October 1465), from the Saxe-Wittenberg line of the House of Ascania, was the wife of John, Margrave of Brandenburg-Kulmbach (1406–1464), called "John the Alchemist", and mother of Dorothea (1430–1495), Queen of Denmark.

== Biography ==
Barbara was born in Dresden in 1405 as the eldest daughter of Rudolf III, Duke of Saxe-Wittenberg and his second wife, Barbara of Silesia-Liegnitz. She had three brothers, Rudolf (died 1406), Wenceslas (died 1407), and Sigismund (died 1407), and a half-sister, Scholastica (1393–1463; married to Jan I of Żagań), from her father's first marriage to Anne of Meissen. Sigismund and Wenceslas were killed in the collapse of a castle tower.

Barbara was betrothed at an early age to John of Brandenburg-Kulmbach, who was one year younger than she. She married John in 1416 when she was eleven and he ten. The marriage was arranged by the future Emperor Sigismund, who had initially planned to grant John the Electorate of Saxony, though this plan was abandoned.

The couple resided for a long time at Plassenburg castle near Kulmbach, then later at Scharfeneck Palace near Baiersdorf, and finally in a city apartment in Nuremberg. Barbara spent the time after her husband's death in Bayreuth. She died there on October 10, 1465, almost a year after her husband's death.

== Family and children ==
Barbara and John had four children, of whom the three girls survived childhood:

- Barbara of Brandenburg (1423 – 7 November 1481), married on 12 November 1433 Ludovico III Gonzaga, Marquis of Mantua.
- Rudolf of Brandenburg (born and died in 1424)
- Elisabeth of Brandenburg (1425 – after 13 January 1465); married, firstly, on 27 August 1440, Joachim, Duke of Pomerania. Married, secondly, on 5 March 1454, Wartislaw X, Duke of Pomerania.
- Dorothea of Brandenburg (1431 – 10 November 1495); married, firstly, on 12 September 1445, King Christopher III of Denmark. Married, secondly, on 28 October 1449, King Christian I of Denmark.

Through her daughter Dorothea, Barbara was a great-grandmother of James IV of Scotland and thus the ancestor of all subsequent monarchs from the House of Stuart.
