= Pomerania-Neustettin =

Former monarchy in Europe

Duchy of Pomerania-Neustettin Herzogtum Pommern-Neustettin (German) Księstwo szczecineckie (Polish) Ducatus Stetinensis Novae (Latin)
- 1368–1390
- Status: State of the Holy Roman Empire
- Capital: Szczecinek
- Religion: Roman Catholic
- Government: Feudal duchy
- Duke
  - 1368–1390: Wartislaw V
- Historical era: Middle Ages
  - Division of Pomerania-Wolgast: 25 May 1368
  - Establishment of the final borders: 8 June 1372
  - Incorporation into Pomerania-Wolgast: 1390
Preceded by	Succeeded by
Pomerania-Wolgast	Pomerania-Wolgast
- Today part of: Poland

The Duchy of Pomerania-Neustettin, (Note: German: Herzogtum Pommern-Neustettin) also known as the Duchy of Neustettin, and the Duchy of Szczecinek, (Note: Polish: Księstwo szczecineckie Latin: Ducatus Stetinensis Novae) was a feudal duchy of the Holy Roman Empire located in Middle Pomerania. It existed between 1372 and 1478. Its capital was Szczecinek. It was formed from the part of the territories Pomerania-Wolgast on 8 June 1368 and existed until 1390 when it was incorporated back into Pomerania-Wolgast. Its only ruler was Duke Wartislaw V of the House of Griffins.

== History ==
In 1365, Barnim IV, duke and co-ruler of Pomerania-Wolgast had died. After his death, his part of the state was inherited by his sons, Wartislaw VI and Bogislaw VI. Barnim's brothers, Wartislaw V and Bogislaw V had gotten into an argument over the division of the duchy's lands. The dispute led to civil war, in which Wartislaw V got support from by Wartislaw VI and Bogislaw VI, as well as by the dukes of Mecklenburg. Eventually, the emperor of the Holy Roman Empire, Charles IV, intervened in the war.

On 25 May 1368, the dukes agreed on a preliminary division of Pomerania-Wolgast, in which Wartislaw V received the Land of Neustettin, centred around the city of Neustettin (now Szczecinek, Poland), and formed the Duchy of Pomerania-Neustettin. The final division of the country was made on 8 June 1372. Wartislaw V ruled the country until his death in 1390. After his death, the duchy was incorporated back into Pomerania-Wolgast.

== List of rulers ==
- 1368–1390: Wartislaw V

== Bibliography ==
- Rodowód książąt pomorskich by E. Rymar. Szczecin. Pomeranian Library. 2005. ISBN 83-87879-50-9, OCLC 69296056.
