= Dorothea of Brandenburg =

Queen of Denmark, Norway, and Sweden (1430–1495)

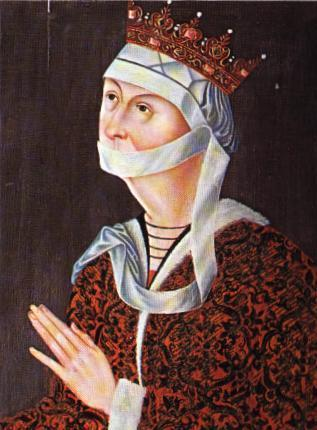
- Contemporary portrait in Frederiksborg Castle, Hillerød

Queen consort of Denmark
- Tenure: 26 September 1445 – 5 January 1448; 28 October 1449 – 21 May 1481
- Coronation: 28 October 1449; Church of Our Lady, Copenhagen

Queen consort of Norway
- Tenure: 26 September 1445 – 5 January 1448; 13 May 1450 – 21 May 1481
- Coronation: 2 August 1450; Nidaros Cathedral, Trondheim

Queen consort of Sweden
- Tenure: 26 September 1445 – 5 January 1448; 23 June 1457 – 23 June 1464
- Coronation: 29 June 1457; Uppsala Cathedral
- Born: 31 December 1430; Brandenburg
- Died: 10 November 1495 (aged 64); Kalundborg, Denmark
- Burial: Roskilde Cathedral
- Spouses: Christopher III of Denmark (m. 1445; died 1448) Christian I of Denmark (m. 1449; died 1481)
- Issue among others...: John, King of Denmark; Margaret, Queen of Scots; Frederick I, King of Denmark
- House: House of Hohenzollern
- Father: John, Margrave of Brandenburg-Kulmbach
- Mother: Barbara of Saxe-Wittenberg

Dorothea of Brandenburg (31 December 1430 – 10 November 1495) was Queen of Denmark, Norway, and Sweden under the Kalmar Union as the consort of first Christopher III of Denmark and later Christian I of Denmark. She served as interim regent during the interregnum in 1448 and as regent in the absence of her second husband during his reign. She and Christian had three surviving children: John, Margaret, and Frederick, of whom John served as king of the union and both sons served as kings of Denmark and Norway.

== Early life ==
Dorothea was born in 1430 or 1431 to John, Margrave of Brandenburg-Kulmbach, and Barbara of Saxe-Wittenberg (1405–1465), the daughter of Rudolf III, Duke of Saxe-Wittenberg. She had two sisters: Barbara (1423–1481), who became Marchioness of Mantua, and Elisabeth (1425- after 13 January 1465), who became Duchess of Pomerania. From about the age of eight, she lived in Bayreuth, where her father was ruler. In 1443, Christopher of Bavaria, the newly elected King of Denmark, Sweden, and Norway, inherited Oberpfalz close to Bayreuth, and a marriage was suggested between Christopher and Dorothea to secure her father's support for Christopher's power over his German domain. The engagement was proclaimed prior to the application of Papal dispensation for affinity in February 1445, which was approved on 10 March.

== Marriage to Christopher of Bavaria ==
On 12 September 1445, the wedding ceremony was conducted between Christopher and Dorothea in Copenhagen, followed by the coronation of Dorothea as queen. The King had financed it with a special tax in all three Kingdoms, and the occasion is described as one of the most elaborate in Nordic Medieval history. The festivities lasted for eight days and were attended by the Princes of Braunschweig, Hesse, and Bavaria and envoys of the Hanseatic League and the Teutonic Order as well as the nobility of Denmark, Sweden, and Norway. Dorothea made her entrance into the city escorted by noblemen from all three Kingdoms dressed in gold riding on white horses, and crowned Queen of Denmark, Sweden, and Norway by bishops from all three Kingdoms with the golden crown from the Vadstena Abbey. On 15 September, she was granted dowers in all three Kingdoms: Roskilde, Ringsted, Haraldsborg, and Skioldenses in Denmark; Jämtland in Norway, and Örebro, Närke, and Värmland in Sweden. Should she choose to live outside of Scandinavia as a widow, she would instead be given a fortune of 45,000 Rhine guilders, one-third from each Kingdom.

Queen Dorothea left for Sweden with the King in January 1446, where they visited Vadstena Abbey and her dower Örebro. During this visit, she met her future antagonist Charles, Lord High Constable of Sweden. According to the chronicle Karlskrönikan, their meeting was a good one during which Charles presented her and her ladies-in-waiting with many gifts. The couple returned to Denmark in September. The marriage between Dorothea and Christopher was politically favorable: her father governed Christopher's German domain and was a loyal supporter and adviser. It did not result in any offspring, however, and according to Ericus Olai, the marriage was not sexually active.

In January 1448, King Christopher died childless, which resulted in a succession crisis that immediately broke the Kalmar Union of the three Kingdoms. Queen dowager Dorothea, being the only royal in Denmark, was proclaimed interim regent of Denmark until a new monarch could be elected. In Sweden, however, the Lord High Constable was elected as King Charles VIII, who was soon elected king of Norway as well. In September, Christian of Oldenburg was elected monarch as Christian I of Denmark and the queen dowager turned over the power to him upon his election.

== Marriage to Christian I of Denmark ==
Queen Dorothea was given a proposal from king Casimir IV of Poland and Albert VI, Archduke of Austria, but she chose to remain in Denmark and marry the newly elected king, Christian I of Denmark. The wedding ceremony was conducted 26 October 1449, followed by the coronation of Christian and herself as king and queen of Denmark. She renounced her existing dower lands in Denmark and Norway, which were replaced with Kalundborg and Samsø in Denmark, and Romerike in Norway, but refused to renounce her Swedish dower lands. The election of Charles as king in Sweden and Norway deprived her of her dower lands in these kingdoms. The newly married couple's ambition was to have Christian crowned in Sweden and Norway as well, and thereby reunite the shattered Kalmar Union.

Christian was crowned in Norway in 1450. The task to win back Sweden was more difficult, and Dorothea waged a long campaign to recruit followers among the Swedish clerics and nobility. Her message to her followers was that their elected king Charles VIII, as her former Lord Constable and subject, was to be regarded as a usurper and a traitor who had broken his vow by depriving her, his former queen, of her dower lands in Sweden. In 1455, she also appealed to the Pope. In February 1457 her campaign succeeded when the rebellion of Archbishop Jöns Bengtsson Oxenstierna deposed Charles VIII, who fled to Germany. Christian was elected king of Sweden in July 1457, thereby reuniting the three Nordic kingdoms. Dorothea made an official entry in Stockholm in December, and her Swedish dower lands were returned to her. In May 1458 the Swedish council approved her and Christian's wish that their sons be secured in the succession to the Swedish throne, a position they had already been granted in Denmark and Norway. The king and queen returned to Denmark in July 1458.

In 1460, Christian bought the Duchy of Schleswig and Holstein, which placed him in debt. He raised taxes to offset this debt, which destroyed his support in Sweden. Sweden again elected Charles VIII as king in 1464. The loss of Sweden was a blow to Queen Dorothea, who started a lifelong campaign to have her spouse (and later her son) again elected king of Sweden, to restore the Kalmar Union of the three Kingdoms and to retrieve her Swedish dower lands.

The loss of her personal dower lands enabled her to pursue the Swedish cause in court, and she sued Charles VIII before the Pope in Rome for depriving her of her dower lands. When Charles VIII was succeeded as the regent of Sweden by Sten Sture the Elder, she pursued her case against him.

In 1475, she traveled to Italy and visited her sister Barbara in Mantua, and Pope Sixtus IV in Rome, and formally applied to have Sten Sture excommunicated. Under excommunication, the Swedish kingdom would be placed under interdict, which would be economically and politically ruinous, resulting in the fall of the Swedish regent and the election of the Danish king as king of Sweden. This was a driving force for the queen during the last twenty years of her life. Following her visit to Rome in May 1475, Sixtus IV subsequently issued a bull to King Christian permitting the establishment of a university in Denmark. As a result, the University of Copenhagen was inaugurated in 1479.

In Denmark, Queen Dorothea was granted the Slotsloven, which gave her the right to command all the castles in Denmark, and she served as regent whenever the king was absent. Her personal wealth also gave her influence. When King Christian acquired Holstein and Schleswig in 1460 and was unable to pay, she loaned him the amount necessary to buy these domains and incorporate them into Denmark. By 1470, she had de facto seized control over Holstein and Schleswig: when Christian was unable to pay back the loan she had given him to buy the domains, she took over the rule of Holstein (1479) and Schleswig (1480) herself and ruled them as her own fiefs. After the death of her father in 1464, she battled her uncle Frederick II, Elector of Brandenburg, over the inheritance.

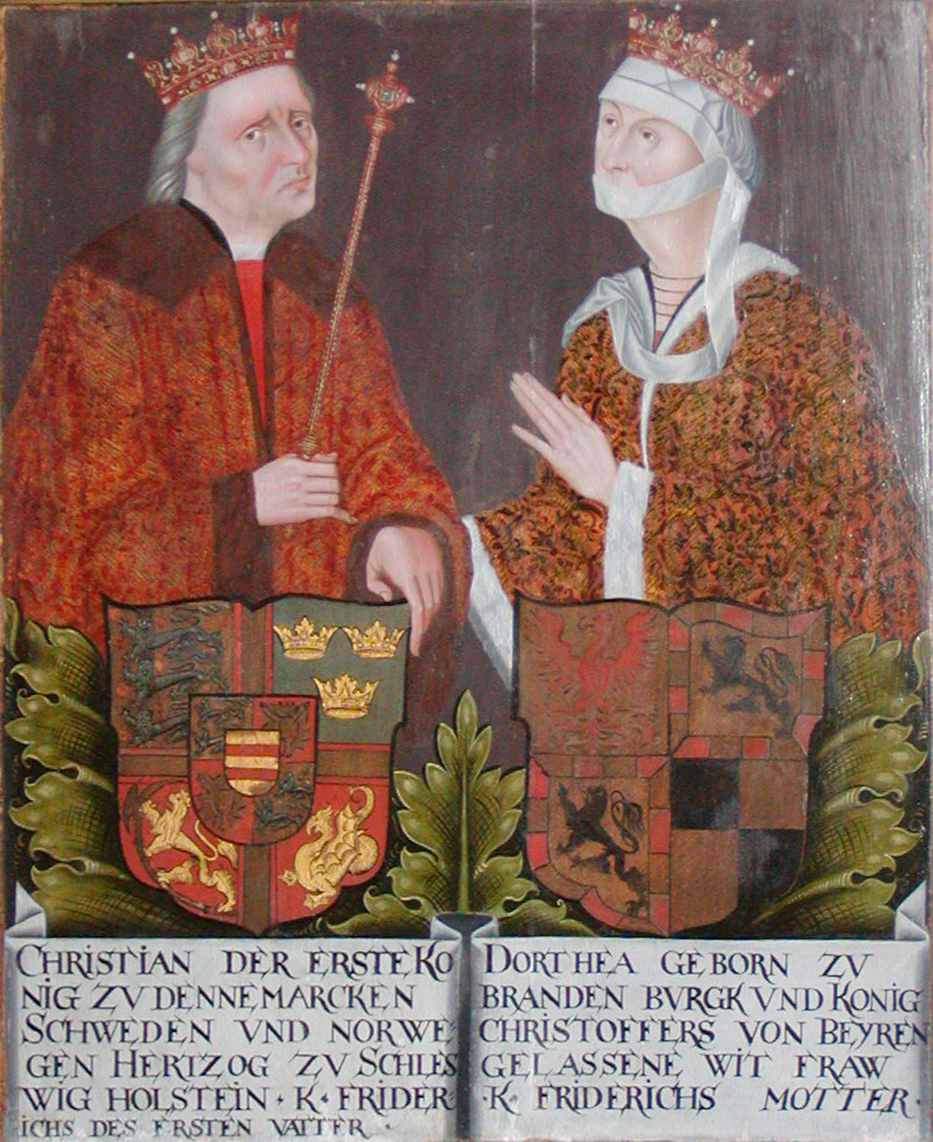
King Christian I and Queen Dorothea

Queen Dorothea has been described as efficient and ambitious, haughty and frugal.

=== Queen Dowager ===
Christian I died on 21 May 1481 and was succeeded by their son John, King of Denmark. As queen dowager, she preferred to reside at Kalundborg Castle. She remained politically active during the reign of her son until her death. She granted the Duchy of Schleswig-Holstein to her younger son Frederick, but it caused a conflict with her elder son and ended in the division of the Duchy between her sons.

Dorothea continued with her ambition to reunite the Kalmar Union of the Nordic Kingdoms, now by having her son elected king of Sweden rather than her spouse by ousting the Swedish regent through an excommunication. In January 1482, she informed her son the king of this plan, and in 1488 she made a second trip to her sister Barbara in Mantua, meeting with Frederick III in Innsbrück, and Pope Innocent VIII in Rome. Dorothea again pressed the matter of excommunicating the Swedish regent. It was with great difficulty that the Swedish envoy in Rome, Hemming Gadh, managed to prevent this. The queen dowager continued this fight until her death: the matter was resolved three years later when her son stated he did not wish to pursue the matter further. Though she died before her son was elected king of Sweden, her work is regarded to have contributed to this outcome.

Dorothea died on 25 November 1495, and is interred next to her second spouse in Roskilde Cathedral.

== Issue ==
Name	Birth	Death	Notes
Olaf	1450	1451	
Canute	1451	1455	
John	2 February 1455	20 February 1513	King of Denmark, Norway and Sweden. Had issue.
Margaret	23 June 1456	14 July 1486	Married King James III of Scotland in 1469. Had issue.
Frederick I	7 October 1471	10 April 1533	King of Denmark and Norway. Had issue.

Dorothea of Brandenburg House of Hohenzollern Born: 1430/1431 Died: 10 November 1495
Royal titles
Preceded by Philippa of England	Queen consort of Denmark; 1445–1448	Vacant
Preceded by Philippa of England	Queen consort of Sweden; Queen consort of Norway; 1445–1448	Succeeded by Catherine of Bjurum
Vacant	Queen consort of Denmark; 1449–1481	Succeeded by Christina of Saxony
Preceded by Catherine of Bjurum	Queen consort of Norway; 1450–1481	Succeeded by Christina of Saxony
Preceded by Catherine of Bjurum	Queen consort of Sweden; 1457–1464	Succeeded by Christina Abrahamsdotter
