= War of the Succession of Stettin =

Military conflict

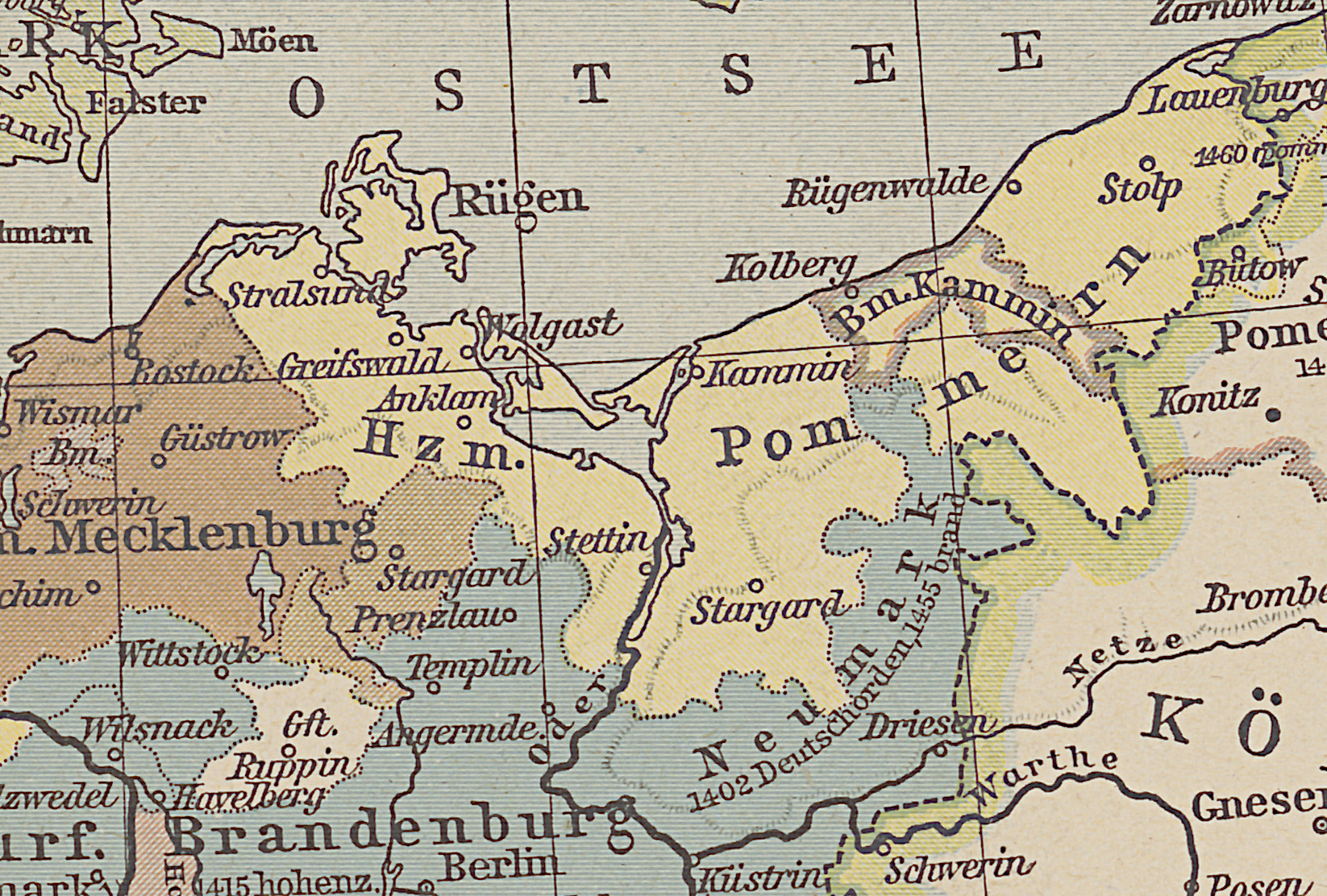
Date	1464–1472
Location	Western Pomerania, Neumark
Result	Brandenburger victory; Recognition of the suzerainty of Brandenburg by Pomerania-Stettin; Recognition of throne succession by the Margraviate of Brandenburg, in case of House of Griffin dying out

Belligerents
Pomerania-Stettin; Pomerania-Wolgast; Pomerania-Stolp; Pomerania-Stargard	Margraviate of Brandenburg; Supporters: Holy Roman Empire

Commanders and leaders
Eric II; Wartislaw X	Frederick II

The War of the Succession of Stettin (German: Stettiner Erbfolgekrieg, Stettiner Erbfolgestreit) was a conflict between the Dukes of Pomerania and the Elector of Brandenburg. It started in 1464, after the death of Duke Otto III, the last Duke of Pomerania-Stettin. The Dukes of Pomerania-Wolgast, Eric II and Wartislaw X, held that they were Otto's rightful heirs. Elector Frederick II of Brandenburg held that Pomerania-Stettin was a fief of Brandenburg. Since its duke, Otto III, had died without a male heir, it should fall back to Brandenburg.

== History ==
After Duke Otto III of Pomerania-Stettin had died of the plague in 1464, Frederick used his claim of suzerainty of Brandenburg over Pomerania, an issue which had never been clarified, to lay claim on Pomerania-Stettin. On 21 January 1466, the Dukes and the Elector concluded the Treaty of Soldin, in which the Elector enfeoffed the Dukes with Pomerania and they recognised him as their liege lord. The Pomeranian Dukes, however, did not meet their treaty obligations and the conflict erupted again. In 1468, Brandenburg captured several Pomeranian towns on both sides of the Oder. After an unsuccessful siege of Ueckermünde, the two sides agreed to a cease-fire. Peace negotiations in Piotrków Kujawski only resulted in an extension of the cease-fire. In May 1470, Eric II invaded the Neumark and started looting. In the meantime, Emperor Frederick III acknowledged the claims of Brandenburg. The emperor enfeoffed Frederick II with Pomerania-Stettin and ordered Eric II and Wartislaw X to recognise Frederick as their liege lord. Duke Henry IV of Mecklenburg mediated, and at the end of May 1472, a lasting peace treaty was signed at Prenzlau. The Dukes and the Estates of Pomerania had to pay homage to the Frederick II, who was also allowed to keep the territories he had conquered.

The Dukes retained a number of law professors from the University of Greifswald to review the peace treaty. Among them were Johannes Parleberg, Matthias von Wedel, Sabel Siegfried the Younger, Hermann Slupwachter, Johann Elzing, Heinrich Zankenstede, and Georg Walter. Gerwin Rönnegarwe and Hertnidt vom Stein also played a role.

== Aftermath ==
The result of the conflict was unfavourable for Pomerania, despite their being allowed to retain Pomerania-Stettin, because it had to acknowledge Brandenburg's suzerainty. Bogislaw X managed to negotiate a more favourable peace for Pomerania in the Treaty of Pyritz of 1493. Brandenburg finally gave up its claim of suzerainty with the Treaty of Grimnitz in 1529. In return, the Dukes of Pomerania had to grant the succession to the Electorate of Brandenburg, in case the House of Pomerania were to die out.
