= Joachim, Duke of Pomerania =

Joachim
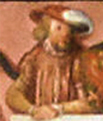
- Painting of Joachim from the 1598 Pedigree of the Pomeranian Dukes by Cornelius Krommeny.

Duke of Pomerania-Stettin
- Reign: 1434–1451
- Predecessor: Casimir V
- Successor: Otto III
- Born: c. 1424
- Died: 22 September 1451
- Burial: Szczecin, Poland
- Spouse: Elisabeth of Brandenburg
- House: Griffin
- Father: Casimir V
- Mother: Catherine of Brunswick-Lüneburg

Joachim, also known as Joachim I, Joachim the Younger, (Note: German: Joachim der Jüngere; Polish: Joachim Młodszy) and Joachim of Pomerania (c. 1424 – 22 September 1451), was a member of the House of Griffin, and the duke of Pomerania-Stettin, that ruled from 1434 to 1451.

== History ==
=== Early life and family ===
Joachim was born around 1424. He was the second son of duke Casimir V from the House of Griffin, who ruled the Duchy of Pomerania-Stettin, and his wife, Catherine of Brunswick-Lüneburg, a daughter of Bernard I, duke of Brunswick-Lüneburg. His parents probably had a first son named Joachim and gave their second son, born after his premature death, the same name. Due to that, he is nicknamed Joachim the Younger, while his older brother, Joachim the Elder. He also had two sisters, Anna, who was a wife of John V of Mecklenburg, and Margaretha, was a wife of graf Albrecht III of Lindow-Ruppin.

As a young child, Joachim was engaged to Barbara of Brandenburg, a daughter of Margrave John of Brandenburg, in 1427. The marriage did not materialize as Barbara married Margrave Ludovico III Gonzaga in 1433 instead. Joachim married Barbara's younger sister Elisabeth of Brandenburg in 1437. They had a son Otto III, who was born in 1444.

=== Rule in Pomerania-Stettin ===
In 1434, around the age of eight, following the death of his father, Casimir V, duke Joachim succeeded him as a ruler of the Duchy of Pomerania-Stettin. Until 1440, the state remained under the regency of Frederick II of Brandenburg. In 1440, Joachim, allied with Pomerania-Wolgast, fought the war against Mecklenburg-Stargard, and Mecklenburg-Schwerin. The conflict ended in 1442, after the long peace negotiations. Frederick II, Prince-elector of the Margraviate of Brandenburg, intervened in the negotiations, demanding Pomerania-Stettin to cede the conquered territory of Uckermark to him, including Pasewalk, and Torgelow.

In 1442, Joachim granted the privileges to the town of Neuwarp. In 1443, he introduced new trade laws in the city of Stettin, which stated, that the trade in the duchy had to be controlled by Stettin traders, and take place in the city. It caused numerous protests of the law by trading guilds, including the city of Stargard.

Between 1445 and 1446, during the war fought between Brandenburg and Pomerania-Wolgast, Brandenburg attacked neutral Pomerania-Stettin, taking two of its bordering towns. This led to the war in 1448 between two states. The war ended on 3 May 1448, following the fighting in Pasewalk. The conflict ended with status quo, with conquered towns remaining under Brandenburg control. Frederick II finally renounced his claims towards Pomerania, following the promise of obtaining the towns after the extinction of the entire male line of the House of Griffin.

=== Death ===
Joachim died on 22 September 1451, in the second plague pandemic of Black Death. He was buried in Ottenkirche church in Stettin. His wife, Elisabeth of Brandenburg, remarried to duke Wartislaw X. He was succeeded on the throne of Pomerania-Stettin, by his son, Otto III. Due to him being underage, the state probably was under the regency of duke Wartislaw IX, and Otto's mother, Elisabeth, who remained under the influence of Frederick II.

== Citations ==
=== Bibliography ===
- Martin Wehrmann: Genealogie des pommerschen Herzogshauses. In: Leon Saunier: Veröffentlichungen der landesgeschichtlichen Forschungsstelle für Pommern, series 1, vol. 5). Stettin, 1937.
- Pommern / Pomerania: Stettin, In: Peter Truhart: Regents of Nations, K. G Saur Münich, 1984-1988 (ISBN 359810491X).
- H. F. Wijnman: Généalogie des ducs de Poméranie, in: Anthony Stokvis: Manuel d'histoire, de généalogie et de chronologie de tous les États du globe, depuis les temps les plus reculés jusqu'à nos jours. 1966.
- K. Kozłowski, J. Podralski: Gryfici. Książęta Pomorza Zachodniego.
- J. W. Szymański: Książęcy ród Gryfitów.
- E. Rymar: Rodowód książąt pomorskich.
