= Bernstein Land =

Historical region in Western Pomerania in Central Europe

The coat of arms of Bernstein Land.

The Bernstein Land, also known as the Pełczyce Land, (Note: German: Land Bernstein; Polish: Ziemia pełczycka; Latin: Terra Bernsteinesis) is a historical region in Western Pomerania in Central Europe, centered around the town of Pełczyce, Poland.

== History ==
The area was first settled between 1230 and 1240. The area used to be a part of the Duchy of Pomerania, and between 1279 and 1478 the ownership between the land has been changed between a few countries, to eventually become the part of Neumark, Margraviate of Brandenburg.

== Symbols ==
The coat of arms of the Bernstein Land is the escutcheon separated into two halves, with the upper half being red, and lower half, a blue and yellow (gold) checker. In the upper half is placed white (silver) upper half of a Griffin. The coat of arms has been used as the symbol of the Duchy of Pomerania-Wolgast.

== Citations ==
=== Bibliography ===
- Encyklopedia Szczecina. vol. 1, A-O. Szczecin. University of Szczecin 1999. ISBN 83-87341-45-2.
