= Świętopełk I of Pomerania =

First known Duke of Pomerania

You may also be looking for Świętopełk II, Duke of Pomerania

Świętopełk I (also referred to as Swantopolk I; born c. 1080, died before 1148) sometimes called "Świętopełk of Nakło" to distinguish him from other rulers of the same name, was one of the first known Dukes of Pomerania; in the years 1109/13 to 1121 he ruled over Pomerelia.

He is usually thought to have been the son of Świętobór I (Swantibor), although other historians make him a brother of Świętobór (as well as of a third Pomeranian duke, Dumar) and son of Siemomysł I.

He is mentioned in the chronicle of Gallus Anonymus. The 16th-century Pomeranian chronicler Thomas Kantzow also states that Świętopełk was one of the younger sons of Swietibor, who ruled Eastern Pomerania after his father was deposed. The Prussian historian Ludwig Giesebrecht, who gave approximate dates for the duke's birth and death, considered him the originator of the Pomeralian dynasty and stated that Świętopełk and his father Swietibor were related to the Piast dynasty through marriage. Other historians have also hypothesized that Świętopełk and Swietibor were related, by blood or by marriage, to the Polish Piast dynasty, or that they served as voyevodas for them in Gdańsk (Danzig). However, Edward Rymar contests the thesis that Świętopełk was Swantibor's son based on the fact that Gallus Anonymous would have surely mentioned that fact, but rather the chronicler described Świętopełk as a "certain Pomeranian" who was granted control over Polish land by the Polish ruler.

Along with his father he was most likely expelled from Pomerania around 1106 by rivals. After Bolesław III Krzywousty defeated Pomeranian dukes at the Battle of Nakło (whose forces, according to Gallus Anonymus numbered thirty thousand), he gave Świętopełk Nakło, and other grods (Slavic settlements) on the river Noteć as a fief.

After Świętopełk tried to carry out foreign policy without approval of the Polish ruler in 1112, Krzywousty invaded his lands. After a three-month siege of Nakło (according to Gallus, from September 29 until December 25), he forced Świętopełk to submit. Świętopełk had to pay a tribute to the Polish duke and gave his son (name unknown) as a hostage. In 1113, Świętopełk once again rebelled against Polish rule and Bolesław once again invaded, taking Wyszogród and Nakło.

Little is known of his later life. In 1119, Krzywousty defeated two unnamed Pomeranian dukes, taking one prisoner and banishing the other. Świętopełk may have been one of the two.

According to later chronicles of Jan Długosz and Kantzow, in 1121, a Duke "Odrzanski" ("of the Oder") named Świętopełk died. Some historians have interpreted this to have been the same Swietopolk, son of Świętobór. However, others consider the "Odrzanski" Swietopolk to have been a different person, Duke of the Chyżans (Kcynians), whose lands were invaded in 1121 by the Saxon prince Lothar of Supplinburg.

Świętopełk had several sons, one of whom served as a hostage at the court of Bolesław Krzywousty. It is possible that this unnamed son was the father of Sobieslaw I, Duke of Pomerania, founder of the Samborides dynasty.

== Works cited ==
- Edward Rymar, Rodowód książąt pomorskich (Genealogy of Dukes of Pomerania), Książnica Pomorska, 2005.
- Gdańskie Towarzystwo Naukowe, Wydział I--Nauk Społecznych i Humanistycznych (Gdańsk Science Association, Division I – Social Sciences and Humanities), Rocznik gdański, Volume 43, Gdańskie Towarzystwo Naukowe, 1983.
- Władysław Kowalenko, Słownik starożytności słowiańskich: encyklopedyczny zarys kultury Słowian od czasów najdawniejszych, Volume 1, Parts 1-2 (Dictionary of ancient Slavdom), Zakład Narodowy im. Ossolińskich, 1991.

== See also ==
- Pomeranian duchies and dukes
