= Elisabeth of Bavaria, Electress of Brandenburg =

Electress of Brandenburg from 1415 to 1440

Elisabeth of Bavaria
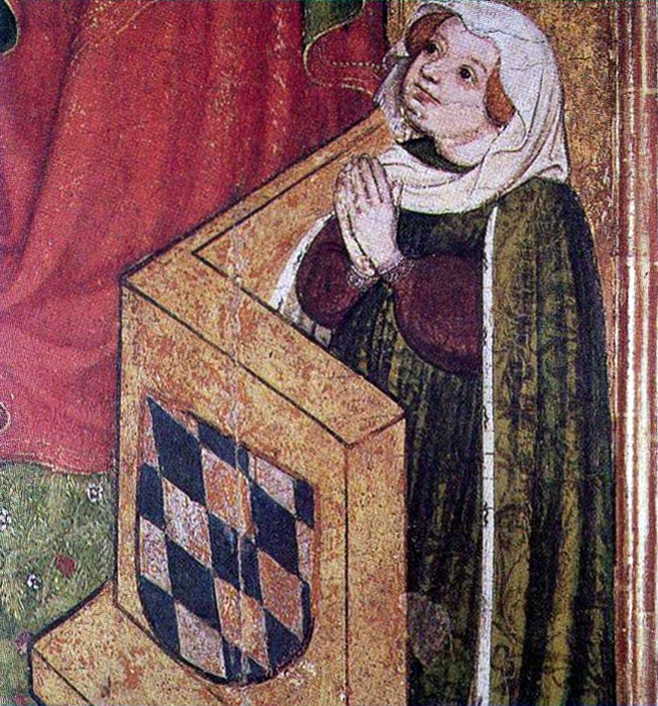

Electress consort of Brandenburg
- Tenure: 30 April 1415 – 20 September 1440
- Born: 1383
- Died: 13 November 1442 (aged 59); Ansbach
- Spouse: Frederick I, Elector of Brandenburg (m. 1401; died 1440)
- Issue: Elisabeth, Duchess of Brzeg-Legnica and Cieszyn; John, Margrave of Brandenburg-Kulmbach; Cecilia, Duchess of Brunswick-Wolfenbüttel; Margaret, Duchess of Mecklenburg; Magdalene, Duchess of Brunswick-Lüneburg; Frederick II, Elector of Brandenburg; Albert III Achilles, Elector of Brandenburg; Dorothea, Duchess of Mecklenburg; Frederick, Margrave of Brandenburg
- House: House of Wittelsbach
- Father: Frederick, Duke of Bavaria
- Mother: Maddalena Visconti

Elisabeth of Bavaria-Landshut (1383 – 13 November 1442), nicknamed "Beautiful Beth", was an Electress of Brandenburg by marriage to Frederick I, Elector of Brandenburg. She acted as regent of Brandenburg during the absence of her husband.

== Life ==
Elizabeth was a daughter of Duke Frederick "the Wise" of Bavaria-Landshut and his second wife Maddalena Visconti.

On 18 September 1401 she married Frederick VI of Hohenzollern, Burgrave of Nuremberg, who was promoted to Elector of Brandenburg in 1415 and ruled as "Elector Frederick I".

During her husband's long journeys to Italy, Hungary, and to the Council of Constance, she represented him wisely despite the great political problems Brandenburg was experiencing at the time.

She is the ancestress of the royal line of the House of Hohenzollern by her third son Albert III Achilles, Elector of Brandenburg.

== Issue ==
With Frederick she had ten children:

1. Elisabeth (1403–31 October 1449, Liegnitz), married:
  1. in Konstanz 1418 Duke Louis II of Brieg and Legnica (1380/5–1436);
  2. in 1438 Duke Wenzel I of Teschen (1413/18–1474).
2. John "the Alchemist" (1406–1465), Margrave of Brandenburg-Kulmbach.
  1. married in 1416 Princess Barbara of Saxe-Wittenberg (1405–1465)
3. Cecilia (c. 1405–4 January 1449), married:
  1. in Berlin 30 May 1423 Duke William I of Brunswick-Lüneburg (1392–1482).
4. Margaret (1410–27 July 1465, Landshut), married:
  1. in 1423 to Duke Albert V, Duke of Mecklenburg (1397–1423);
  2. in Ingolstadt 20 July 1441 to Louis VIII, Duke of Bavaria (1403–1445);
  3. in 1446 to Count Martin of Waldenfels (d. 1471).
5. Magdalene (c. 1412 –27 October 1454, Scharnebeck), married:
  1. in Tangermünde 3 July 1429 to Duke Frederick of Brunswick-Lüneburg (1418–1478).
6. Frederick II (1413–1471), Elector of Brandenburg
  1. married in 1446 Princess Catherine of Saxony (1421–1476)
7. Albrecht Achilles, (1414–1486), Elector of Brandenburg, married:
  1. in 1446 Princess Margarete of Baden (1431–1457)
  2. in 1458 Princess Anna of Saxony (1437–1512)
8. Sofie, born and died 1417.
9. Dorothea (9 February 1420–19 January 1491, Rehna), married:
  1. in 1432 Duke Henry IV, Duke of Mecklenburg (1417–1477)
10. Frederick "the Fat" (c. 1424–6 October 1463, Tangermünde), Lord of Altmark, married:
  1. in 1449 Princess Agnes of Pomerania (1436–1512)

Elisabeth of Bavaria, Electress of Brandenburg House of Wittelsbach Born: 1383 Died: 13 November 1442
German nobility
Preceded by Barbara of Celje	Electress consort of Brandenburg; 30 April 1415 – 20 September 1440	Vacant Title next held by Catherine of Saxony
Preceded by Barbara of Celje	Margravine of Brandenburg; 18 April 1417 – 13 January 1426	Succeeded by Barbara of Saxe-Wittenberg
Preceded by Elisabeth of Meissen	Burgravine of Nuremberg; 18 September 1401 – 1427	Burgraviate abolished Titular title remained held by Elector of Brandenburg
New title margraviate of Brandenburg-Ansbach created in 1398 upon the death of Frederick V, Burgrave of Nuremberg, whose sons divided his territories	Margravine of Brandenburg-Ansbach; 18 September 1401 – 20 September 1440	Vacant Title next held by Margaret of Baden
Preceded by Margaret of Bohemia	Margravine of Brandenburg-Kulmbach; 11 June 1420 – 20 September 1440	Succeeded by Barbara of Saxe-Wittenberg
