= House of Griffin =

Pomeranian noble family

- Parent house: House of Piast or Gryfit family
- Country: Kingdom of Poland; Duchy of Pomerania; Kalmar Union; Holy Roman Empire
- Founded: 12th century
- Founder: Wartislaw I
- Final ruler: Bogislaw XIV
- Titles: King of Denmark; King of Norway; King of Sweden; Duke of Pomerania; Duke of Pomerelia; Prince of Rügen
- Dissolution: 1660; 366 years ago

The House of Griffin or Griffin dynasty (German: Greifen; Polish: Gryfici; Danish: Grif; Latin: Gryphes), (Note: The family is also known as the Gryf family, the Greifen family, the Greifen dynasty, or the House of Greifen.) or House of Pomerania (see § Name of the Dynasty), was a dynasty of Pomeranian origin, ruling the Duchy of Pomerania from the 12th century until 1637. The name "Griffins" was used by the dynasty after the 15th century and had been taken from the ducal coat of arms. Duke Wartislaw I (died 1135) was the first historical ruler of the Duchy of Pomerania and the founder of the Griffin dynasty. The most prominent Griffin was Eric of Pomerania, who became king of the Kalmar Union in 1397, thus ruling Denmark, Sweden, Finland and Norway. The last Griffin duke of Pomerania was Bogislaw XIV, who died during the Thirty Years' War, which led to the division of Pomerania between Brandenburg-Prussia, Sweden and Poland. Duchess Anna von Croy, daughter of Duke Bogislaw XIII and the last member of the House of Griffin, died in 1660.

== Name of the Dynasty ==
The dynasty is known by two names, Pomerania, after their primary fief, and Griffin, after their coat of arms, which had featured a griffin since the late 12th century: the first verifiable use of the griffin as the dynasty's heraldic emblem occurred in a seal of Casimir II, Duke of Pomerania, which showed the imaginary beast within a shield, and was attached to a document dated 1194.

The name Pomerania comes from Slavic po more, which means "[land] along the sea".

== Origins and branches ==
The origins of the Griffins are not clear. Most theories derive them from either local West Slavic nobility or a cadet branch of the Polish house of Piasts. Medieval Polish chronicler Jan Długosz connected them with Polish noble family of Świebodzice from the south province of Poland named the Lesser Poland, who also used a griffin as their coat-of-arms and who in turn might also have been a cadet branch of the Piasts. At any rate, chronicler Gallus Anonymus in his Gesta principum Polonorum calls the Griffins "close cousins" of then-contemporary Bolesław III of Poland, directly implying a close dynastic relationship with the Piasts.

In the 17th century, the Griffins derived their roots from legendary beings from Sorb mythology called Gryphus or Baltus.

The first known members of the Griffins were the brothers Wartislaw I and Ratibor I. Wartislaw would be the ancestor of the line of dukes that ruled the Duchy of Pomerania until 1630; Ratibor would be the ancestor of the Ratiborides branch of the Griffins, that was to rule the lands of Schlawe and Stolp until the line became extinct and the area was incorporated in the Duchy of Pomerania. The first known member of the Swantiborides branch of the Griffins, notable as castellans of Pomeranian cities, was Wartislaw (II) Swantiboriz.

== Family tree ==
Gryf

Swietopelk I † 1113
Wartislaw I † 1135 | Ratibor I † 1156
Kasimir I 1130-1219 | Bogislaw I 1130-1187 | Swietopelk II
Wartislaw II; 1160-1184 | Bogislaw II; 1177-1220 | Kasimir II; 1180-1219
Bogislaw III; 1190-1223 | Barnim I 1217-1278 | Wartislaw III; 1210-1264
Ratibor II; 1210-1238 | Bogislaw IV; 1255-1309 | Barnim II; 1277-1295 | Otto I 1279-1344
Wartislaw IV; 1290-1326 | Barnim III; 1300-1368
Bogislaw V 1318-1374 | Barnim IV; 1325-1365 | Wartislaw V 1326-1390 | Kasimir III; 1348-1372 | Swantibor I 1351-1413 | Bogislaw VII; 1355-1404
Kasimir IV; 1351-1377 | Wartislaw VII; 1363-1394 | Bogislaw VIII; 1364-1418 | Barnim V 1369-1402 | Wartislaw VI; 1345-1394 | Bogislaw VI; 1350-1393 | Otto II; 1380-1428 | Kasimir V 1380-1435
Erik I 1381-1459 | Bogislaw IX; 1400-1457 | Barnim VI; 1365-1405 | Wartislaw VIII; 1373-1415 | Joachim; 1424-1451
Sophie; 1435-1497 | Barnim VII; 1390-1450 | Wartislaw IX; 1400-1457 | Barnim VIII; 1406-1451 | Swantibor II; 1408-1432 | Otto III; 1444-1464
Wartislaw X 1435-1478 | Erik II; 1420-1474
Bogislaw X 1454-1523
Georg I 1493-1531 | Barnim IX; 1501-1573
Philipp I 1515-1560
Johann Friedrich; 1542-1600 | Bogislaw XI; 1544-1606 | Ernst Ludwig; 1545-1592 | Barnim X 1549-1603
Philipp II; 1573-1618 | Franz; 1577-1620 | Bogislaw XII; 1580-1637 | Georg II; 1582-1617 | Philipp Julius; 1584-1625

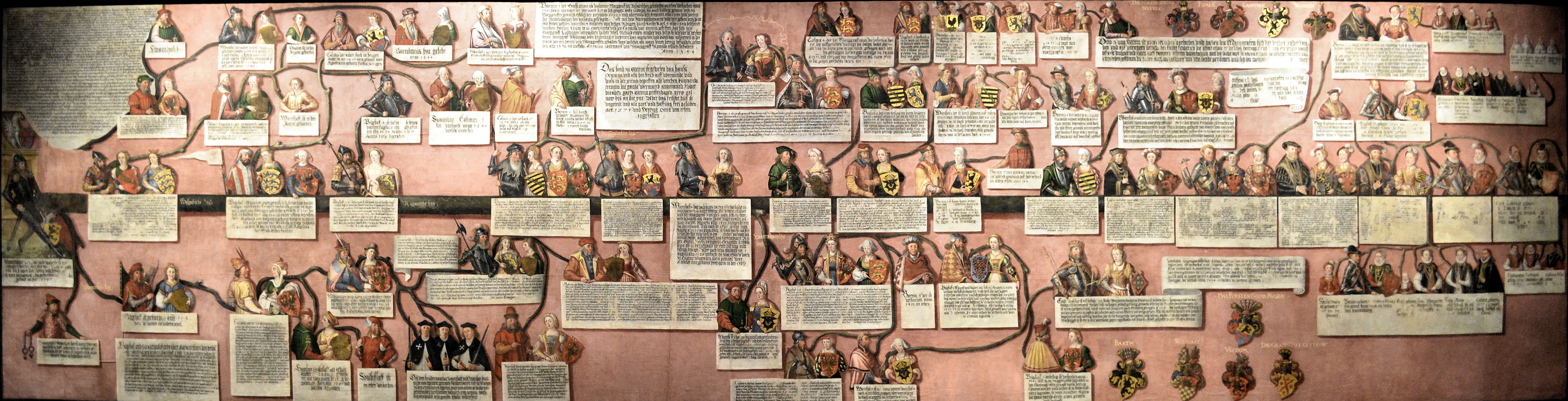
Family tree of the House of Pomerania, 1598, National Museum in Szczecin

=== Wartislaw I to Bogislaw IV and Otto I ===
1. Wartislaw I († between 1134 and 1148)
  1. Bogusław I (* about 1130; † 1187) ∞ (I) Walburgis († 1177), daughter of Valdemar I of Denmark;
    (II) Anastasia, daughter of Mieszko III of Poland and Eudoxia of Kiev
    1. (I) Ratibor (* 1160; † 1183) ∞ Salome, daughter of Mieszko III of Poland and Eudoxia of Kiev
    2. (I) Wartislaw II. (* 1160; † 1184) ∞ Sophia, daughter of Bolesław IV. of Poland
    3. (II) Bogislaw II. (* um 1177; † 1220) ∞ Miroslawa (†1233), Daughter of Mestwin I of Pomerelia and Swinislawa
      1. Woislawa († 1229)
      2. Barnim I (* ca. 1217/19; † 1278) ∞ (I) Marianne, Daughter of William of Lüneburg and Helene of Denmark
        (II) Margarete of Brunswick
        (III) Mathilde (Mechthild) († 1316), Daughter of Otto III, Margrave of Brandenburg and Beatrix of Böhmen
        1. (I) Anastasia (* 1245; † 1317) ∞ Henry I of Mecklenburg (1230–1302)
        2. (II) Bogislaw IV (*1258; † 1309) → Pomerania-Wolgast (see section below)
        3. (III) Barnim II (* about 1277; † 1295)
        4. (III) Otto I (* about 1279; † 1344) → Pomerania-Stettin (see section below)
        5. (III) Miroslawa († 1328) ∞ Nikolaus I of Schwerin
        6. (III) Beatrix († 1300 or 1315) ∞ Henry II of Werle
        7. (?) Dobroslawa ∞ Jaczo of Salzwedel
    4. (II) Casimir II (* c. 1180, † 1219) ∞ Ingardis of Denmark
      1. Wartislaw III(* c. 1210; † 1264) ∞ Sophia
      2. Elisabeth († 1222)
    5. (II) Dobroslawa (* before 1187, † c. 1226)
  2. Casimir I. (* after 1130; † 1180) ∞ Pritolawa
2. Ratibor I († 1156) → Ratiborides
3. Swantibor → Swantiborides

=== Bogislaw IV to Bogislaw X (Pomerania-Wolgast, -Barth, and -Stolp) ===
1. Bogislaw IV (*1258; † 1309) ∞ (I) Mechthild († vor 1309), Daughter of John I of Brandenburg and Jutta of Saxony
  (II) Margareta, (Daughter of Wizlaw II of Rügen and Agnes of Brandenburg
  1. (II) Euphemia of Pomerania (1289–1330) ∞ Christopher II of Denmark
  2. (II) Margareta (1287–1337) ∞ (I) Nikolaus of Rostock († 1314), (II) John of Ścinawa († 1365)
  3. (II) Wartislaw IV (* before 1290; † 1326) ∞ Elisabeth of Lindau-Ruppin (?)
    1. Bogislaw V-Stolp (* c. 1318; † 1373/74) ∞ (I) Elisabeth of Poland, daughter of Casimir III of Poland and Aldona of Lithuania
      (II) Adelheid of Brunswick-Grubenhagen, daughter of Ernest I of Brunswick-Grubenhagen and Adelheid of Everstein
      1. (I) Casimir IV (* c. 1351; † 2.1.1377) ∞ (I) Johanna (Kenna) († 1368), daughter of Olgierd of Lithuania and Mary of Witebsk
        (II) Margareta († 1409), daughter of Siemowit III of Masovia and Eufemia of Toppau
      2. (I) Elisabeth of Pomerania (* 1347; † 15.2.1393) ∞ Charles IV, Holy Roman Emperor
      3. (I) Daughter 2
      4. (II) Wartislaw VII (* 1363/64; † 1395) ∞ Maria of Mecklenburg, daughter of Henry III of Mecklenburg
        1. Eric (Bogislaw) of Pomerania (* 1382; † 1459) ∞ Philippa, daughter of Henry IV (England).
        2. Catherine of Pomerania (* c. 1390; † 4.3.1426) ∞ John of Pfalz-Neumarkt
          1. Christopher III of Denmark
      5. (II) Bogislaw VIII (* c. 1364; † 11.2.1418) ∞ Sophie of Holstein
        1. Bogislaw IX (* 1407/10; † 7.12.1446) ∞ Maria of Masovia, daughter of Siemowit IV of Masovia and Alexandra of Lithuania
          1. Sophia (* c. 1435; † 24.8.1497) ∞ Eric II, Duke of Pomerania-Wolgast
          2. Alexandra
      6. (II) Barnim V (* 1369; † 1402/04)
      7. (II) Margareta
    2. Barnim IV (* 1325; † 22.8.1365) ∞ Sophie, daughter of John II of Werle
      1. Wartislaw VI (* c. 1345; † 1394) ∞ Anna, daughter of John I, Duke of Mecklenburg-Stargard
        1. Barnim VI (* c. 1365; † 1404) ∞ Veronica of Hohenzollern
          1. Wartislaw IX (* um 1400; † 1457) ∞ Sophia of Saxe-Lauenburg, daughter of Eric IV
            1. Eric II. (* c. 1425; † 1474) ∞ Sophia († 1497), daughter Bogislaw IX of Pomerania-Stolp
              1. Bogislaw X (* 1454; † 1523)
              2. Casimir VII. (VI.) (* c. 1455; † 1474)
              3. Wartislaw XI (after 1465–1475)
              4. Barnim († 1474)
              5. Elisabeth, Priorin in Verchen abbey († 1516)
              6. Sophia, (* 1460, † 1504) ∞ Magnus II of Mecklenburg
              7. Margarete († 1526), married to Balthasar of Mecklenburg
              8. Catherine (ca. 1465–1526), ∞ Duke Henry IV of Brunswick and Lunenburg (1463–1514), Prince of Wolfenbüttel
              9. Mary, Äbtissin of Wollin († 1512)
            2. Wartislaw X (* c. 1435; † 1478) ∞ (I) Elisabeth († 1465), widow of Joachim of Pommern-Stettin, daughter of John of Brandenburg-Kulmbach
              (II) Magdalena of Mecklenburg, widow of Count Burkhard of Barby
              1. (I) Swantibor († 1464)
              2. (I) Ertmar († 1464)
            3. Elisabeth
            4. Christoph
          2. Barnim VII (* um 1390; † 1450)
          3. Elisabeth, Äbtissin of Kammin
        2. Wartislaw VIII ∞ Agnes of Saxe-Lauenburg, daughter of Eric IV of Saxe-Lauenburg
          1. Barnim VIII. (* c. 1406, † 1451) ∞ Anna of Wunstorf
            1. Agnes (1434–1512) ∞ (I) 1449 Frederick of Altmark (the Fat)
              (II) 1478 George II of Anhalt-Zerbst
        3. Sophie ∞ Henry I of Brunswick
      2. Bogislaw VI
      3. Elisabeth ∞ Magnus I of Mecklenburg
    3. Wartislaw V
  4. (II) Jutta (1290–1336), Äbtissin in Krummin abbey
  5. (II) Elisabeth (1291–1349) ∞ Eric I of Saxe-Lauenburg

=== Otto I to Otto III (Pomerania-Stettin) ===
1. Otto I (* c. 1279; † 1344) ∞ Elisabeth (*1281), daughter of Gerhard II, Count of Holstein-Plön and Ingeborg of Sweden
  1. Barnim III (before 1300; † 24.08.1368) ∞ Agnes (1318–1371), daughter of Henry II, Duke of Brunswick-Lunenburg (Grubenhagen)
    1. Otto
    2. Casimir III (* before 1348; † 1372)
    3. Swantibor I (III) (* ca 1351; † 21.6.1413) ∞ Anna of Hohenzollern, daughter of Albrecht of Nuremberg (the Pretty)
      1. Otto II (* c. 1380; † 27.3.1428) ∞ Agnes, daughter of John II, Duke of Mecklenburg-Stargard and Wilheida of Lithuania
      2. Casimir V (VI) (* after 1380; † 12.4.1435) ∞ (I) Catherine of Brunswick-Lüneburg († 1429), daughter of Bernard I, Duke of Brunswick-Lüneburg (Celle)
        (II) Elisabeth († 1451), daughter of Eric I, Duke of Brunswick-Lüneburg (Grubenhagen)
        1. (I) Joachim the Elder (* um 1424)
        2. (I) Anna († 1447) ∞ John V of Mecklenburg-Schwerin
        3. (I) Joachim the Younger (* after 1424; † 1451) ∞ Elisabeth (* 1425; † 1465), daughter of John of Brandenburg and Barbara of Saxe-Wittenberg
          1. Otto III (* 29.5.1444; † 10.9.1464)
      3. Albrecht
      4. Margareta
    4. Bogislaw VII (*before 1355; † 1404)
  2. Mechthild († 1331) ∞ John III of Werle († 1352)

=== Bogislaw X to Bogislaw XIV ===
1. Bogislaw X (* 1454; † 1523) ∞ Anna (1476–1503), daughter of Casimir IV. of Poland
  1. Sophie of Pomerania (* 1498, † 1568) ∞ Frederick I of Denmark
  2. George I (* 1493, † 1531) ∞ (I) Amalia (* 1490; † 1525), daughter of Elector Palatine Philip and Margaret of Bavaria
    (II) Margarete of Brandenburg, daughter of Joachim I of Brandenburg and Elisabeth of Denmark.
    1. (I) Bogislaw (* 1514)
    2. (I) Phillip I (* 1515; † 1560) ∞ Maria († 1583), daughter of John of Saxony
      1. Georg (died early)
      2. Erich (died early)
      3. John Frederick (* 1542; † 1600)
      4. Bogislaw XIII (* 1544; † 1606) ∞ Clara, daughter of Francis of Brunswick-Lüneburg
        1. Philip II (* 1573; † 1618) ∞ Sophia, daughter of John II, Duke of Schleswig-Holstein-Sonderburg
        2. Francis (* 1577; † 1620) ∞ Sophia, daughter of Christian I of Saxony
        3. Bogislaw XIV (* 1580; † 1637) ∞ Elisabeth, daughter of John II, Duke of Schleswig-Holstein-Sonderburg and Elisabeth of Brunswick-Grubenhagen
        4. Ulrich (* 1589; † 1622) ∞ Hedwig of Brunswick († 1650)
        5. Anna ∞ Ernest of Croy and Aerschot
          1. Ernest Bogislaw of Croy
      5. Ernest Louis (* 1545, † 1592) ∞ Sophia Hedwig (1561–1631), daughter of Julius of Brunswick-Wolfenbüttel
        1. Hedwig Maria
        2. Elisabeth Magdalena
        3. Philipp Julius(* 1584, † 1625) ∞ Agnes, daughter of John George of Brandenburg.
      6. Barnim X (IX)
      7. Casimir VI (IX) (* 1557, † 1605)
      8. Amalia (died unmarried)
      9. Margaret ∞ Duke Francis II of Saxe-Lauenburg
      10. Anna ∞ Ulrich of Mecklenburg-Güstrow
    3. (I) Margaret (1518–1569) ∞ Ernest III of Brunswick-Grubenhagen
    4. (II) Georgia (* 1531; † 1574) ∞ Stanislaus Latalski Count of Latochin
  3. Anna (* 1492, † 1550) ∞ George I of Silesia of Silesia-Liegnitz
  4. Barnim (* before 1501, † before 1501)
  5. Barnim IX (* 1501, † 1573)
  6. Elisabeth († before 1518)
  7. Otto (* before 1503, † before 1518)
  8. Casimir VIII (* 1494, † 1518)
  9. Christopher; probably an illegitimate son, as Junker Christopher, Tochof of Schwerin

== Branches ==
=== Ratiborides ===
Members of the Ratiborides (Ratiboriden) branch were most probably descendants of Ratibor I, a brother of Wartislaw I.

1. Ratibor I
  1. Bogislaw, ∞ (I) N.N.; (II) a daughter of Mieszko III of Poland
    1. (I) Bogislaw (III), ∞ another daughter of Mieszko III of Poland
    2. (II ?) Ratibor II (either half-brother of Bogislaw III or cousin)

=== Swantiborides ===
The Swantiborides (Polish: Świętoborzyce) were related to the Griffins, but the link remains unclear. Probably they descend from Swantibor, a Pomeranian duke overthrown in a rebellion and expelled to Poland in 1105/06. This Swantibor might have been a cousin of Świętopełk, a Pomeranian duke defeated by Boleslaw III of Poland in a campaign of 1111/12. Yet, these assumptions all remain speculative.

1. Wartislaw (II) Swantibor (↑ 1196), Castellan of Szczecin ∞ unknown wife
  1. Bartholomew († 1219), Castellan of Gützkow ∞ unknown wife
    1. Wartislaw (* 1175/80, ↑ 1233), Castellan of Szczecin, Lord of Gützkow 1219 ∞ Dobroslawa, widow of Boleslaw of Poland Duke of Kujavia, daughter of Bogislaw I
      1. Bartholomew (+ 1206/10, ↑ 1259/60)
  2. Wartislaw (↑ 1230/32), Castellan of Szczecin
  3. Konrad (↑ 1233), Canon at Kammin Cathedral 1176/1186, provost 1186/1189 and 1208, Bishop of Kammin 1219
  4. Casimir (↑ 1219), Castellan of Kołobrzeg ∞ unknown wife
    1. Swietoslawa / Swiatochna (↑ after 1217)
    2. Swantibor (* 1219, ↑ 1244) ∞ unknown wife
      1. Casimir (↑1277/1280), Castellan of Kolberg (Kołobrzeg) ∞ Miroslawa, who secondly married Johann Ramel, Castellan of Kolberg and Pomeranian counsellor 1265/1297.
    3. daughter 3 ∞ Czyrnek, Castellan of Kolberg

== Griffins Kings and Queens ==
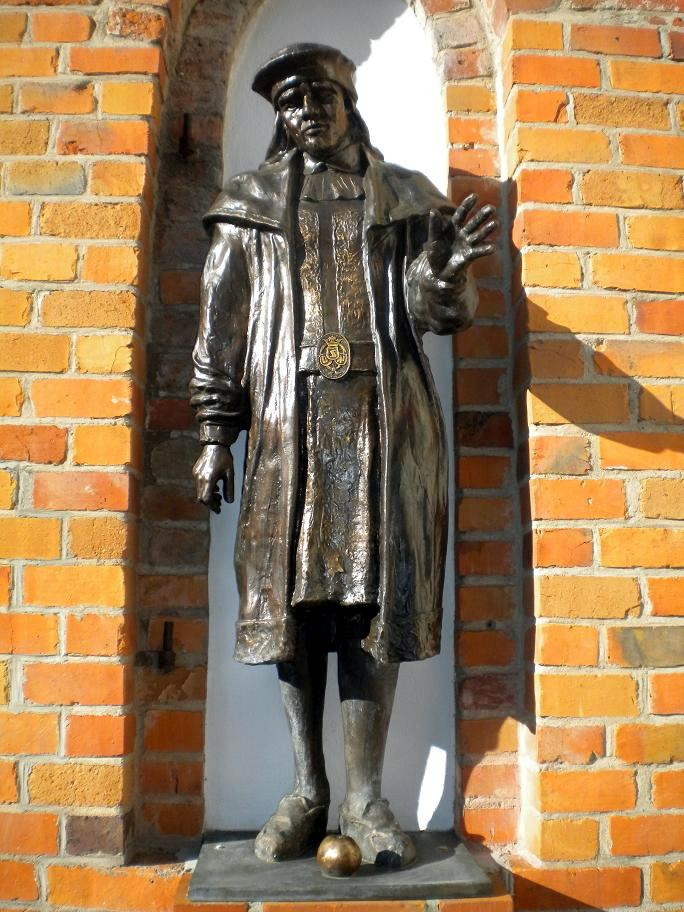
Statue of King Eric at Darłowo Castle in Poland

1. Eric of Pomerania, son of Wartislaw VII, was King of Norway (1389–1442), elected King of Denmark (1396–1439), and of Sweden (1396–1439). He was the first king of the Nordic Kalmar Union.
2. Euphemia of Pomerania, daughter of Bogislaw IV, married Christopher II of Denmark and became queen of Denmark.
3. Elizabeth of Pomerania, daughter of Bogislaw V, was the fourth and last wife of Charles IV, Holy Roman Emperor and king of Bohemia. Her daughter Anne of Bohemia, of Luxembourg and of Pomerania became Queen of England as a wife of King Richard II of England. She was known as "Good Queen Anne".
4. Sophie of Pomerania, daughter of Bogislaw X, married King Frederick I of Denmark and became Queen of Denmark and Norway.

== Burial sites ==
Main burial sites of the Griffins are the Ducal Castle in Szczecin, Saint John Co-Cathedral in Kamień Pomorski and Saint Peter church in Wolgast. Eric of Pomerania, King of Denmark, Norway and Sweden, is buried in the Our Lady of Częstochowa church in Darłowo.

== Eponymy ==
Ranunculus gryphum, a microspecies of Ranunculus auricomus known from Pomerania, was named in honour of the dynasty.

== Sources ==
- Edward Rymar: Rodowód książąt pomorskich, Szczecin 1995.
- Martin Wehrmann: Genealogie des pommerschen Fürstenhauses. Veröffentlichungen the landesgeschichtlichen Forschungsstelle für Pommern, Reihe 1, Bd. 5. Leon Saunier, Stettin 1937.
- Martin Wehrmann: Geschichte von Pommern. Weltbild Verlag 1992, Reprint der Ausgaben von 1919 und 1921, ISBN 3-89350-112-6
- Udo Madsen: Die Greifen - Das herzogliche Geschlecht von Pommern

== See also ==
- Pomeranian duchies and dukes
- History of Pomerania
