= Pomerania-Wolgast =

Former monarchy in Europe

Duchy of Pomerania-Wolgast (Teil-)Herzogtum Pommern-Wolgast (German) Księstwo wołogoskie (Polish) Ducatus Wolgastensis (Latin)
- 1295–1478
- Coat of arms

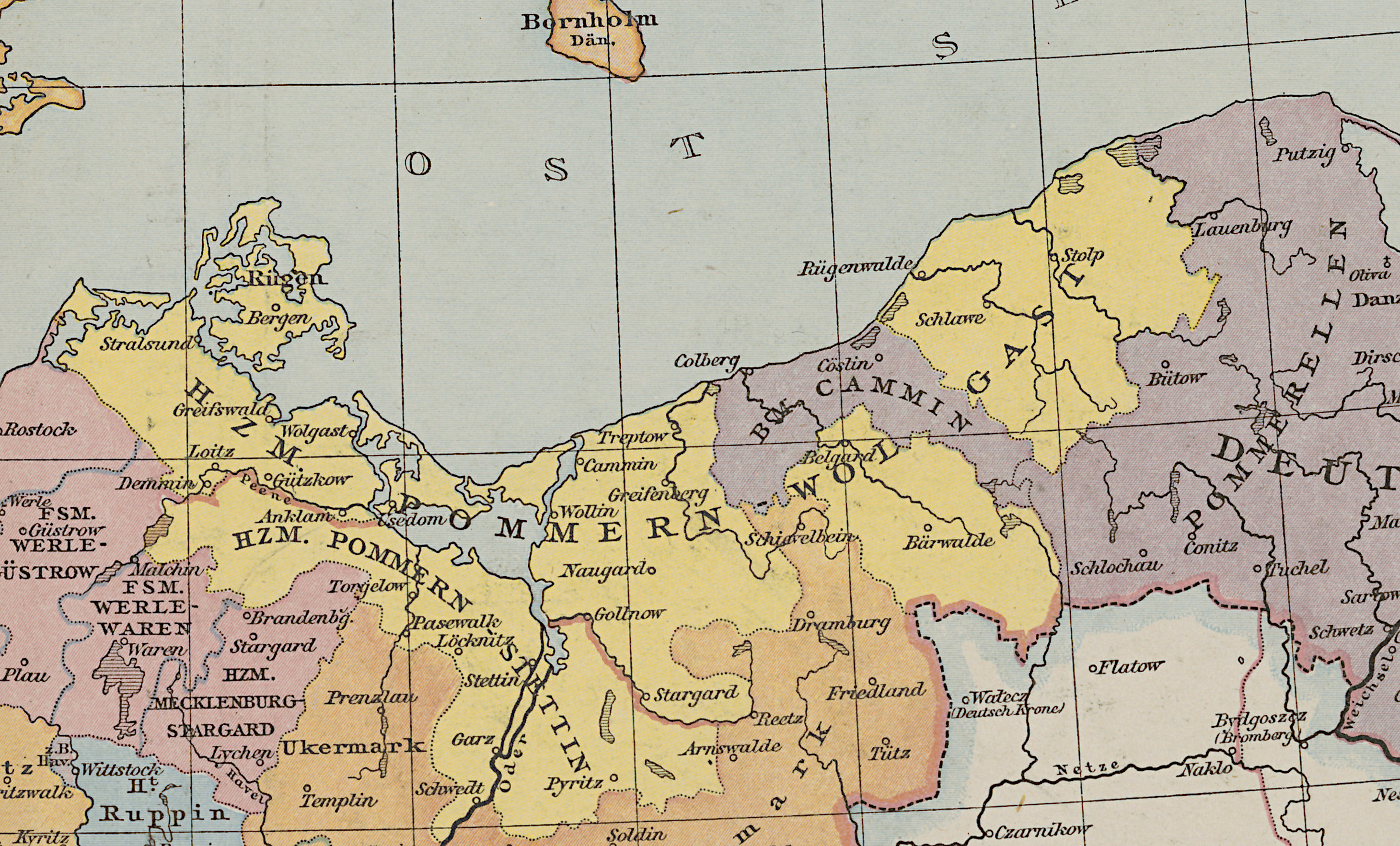
- Pomerania-Wologast in 1400.
- Status: State of the Holy Roman Empire
- Capital: Wolgast
- Religion: Roman Catholic
- Government: Feudal duchy
- Duke
  - 1295–1309 (first): Bogislaw IV
  - 1474–1478 (last): Wartislaw X
- Historical era: Late Middle Ages
  - Partition of the Duchy of Pomerania: 1295
  - Partition of part of its territory into Pomerania-Stolp and Pomerania-Neustettin: 25 May 1368
  - Partition of part of its territory into Pomerania-Stargard: 1377
  - Unification of the Duchy of Pomerania: 1478
Preceded by
Duchy of Pomerania
Pomerania-Neustettin
Succeeded by
Duchy of Pomerania
Pomerania-Stolp
Pomerania-Stargard
Pomerania-Barth
Pomerania-Neustettin
- Today part of: Poland; Germany

The Duchy of Pomerania-Wolgast, (Note: German: (Teil-)Herzogtum Pommern-Wolgast) also known as the Duchy of Wolgast, and the Duchy of Wołogoszcz, (Note: Polish: Księstwo wołogoskie; Latin: Ducatus Wolgastensis) was a feudal duchy in Western Pomerania within the Holy Roman Empire. Its capital was Wolgast. It was ruled by the Griffin dynasty. It existed in the Late Middle Ages era from 1295 to 1478.

The state was formed in 1160, in the partition of the Duchy of Pomerania, with duke Bogislaw IV, as its first ruler. In 1478, the state was incorporated into the re-unified Duchy of Pomerania, under the rule of duke Bogislaw X. During its existence, part of its territory was partitioned into Pomerania-Stolp (1368), Pomerania-Neustettin (1368), Pomerania-Barth (1376), and Pomerania-Stargard (1377).

== Symbols ==
The coat of arms of the duchy was the escutcheon separated into two halves, with the upper half being red, and lower half, a blue and yellow (gold) checker. In the upper half is placed white (silver) upper half of a Griffin. It was originally the coat of arms of the Bernstein Land.

== List of rulers ==
- Bogislaw IV (1295–1309)
- Wartislaw IV (1309–1326)
- Bogislaw V, Wartislaw V, and Barnim IV (1326–1365)
- Bogislaw V and Wartislaw V (1365–1368)
- Bogislaw VI and Wartislaw VI (1368–1376)
- Bogislaw VI (1376–1393)
- Wartislaw VI (1393–1394)
- Barnim VI (1394–1405)
- Barnim VII and Wartislaw IX (1405–1451)
- Wartislaw IX (1451–1457)
- Eric II (1457–1474)
- Wartislaw X (1474–1478)

== Citations ==
=== Bibliography ===
- Rodowód książąt pomorskich by E. Rymar. Szczecin. Pomeranian Library. 2005. ISBN 83-87879-50-9, OCLC 69296056. (Polish)
- Źródła do kaszubsko-polskich aspektów Pomorza Zachodniego do roku 1945, vol. 1 by B. Wachowiak, in Pomorze Zachodnie pod rządami książąt plemiennych i władców z dynastii Gryfitów: (990-1121-1637-1648/1653) by Z. Szultka. Polska Akademia Nauk, Instytut Historii im. Tadeusza Manteuffla, Wydawnictwo Poznańskie, Zrzeszenie Kaszubsko-Pomorskie, Poznań–Gdańsk. 2006. ISBN 83-7177-459-1. (Polish)
- Gryfici. Książęta Pomorza Zachodniego by K. Kozłowski and J. Podralski. Szczecin. Krajowa Agencja Wydawnicza. 1985. ISBN 83-03-00530-8, OCLC 189424372. (Polish)
- Zdzisław Machura, O Księżnych i Książętach znanych z historii miasta Słupska: publikacja wydana z okazji X Jubileuszowego Jarmarku Gryfitów.
- Werner Buchholz, Pommern, Siedler, 1999, ISBN 3-88680-272-8.
- Oliver Auge, Die pommerschen Greifen als Fürsten von Rügen und Herzöge von Barth, in: Melanie Ehler, Matthias Müller (eds.), Unter fürstlichem Regiment. Barth als Residenz der pommerschen Herzöge, Lukas Verlag, Berlin, 2005, ISBN 3-936872-55-4.
- Encyklopedia Szczecina, vol. 1. A-O. Szczecin. University of Szczecin. 1999. p. 336. ISBN 83-87341-45-2.
