= Wartislaw X =

15th-century Duke of Pomerania-Wolgast

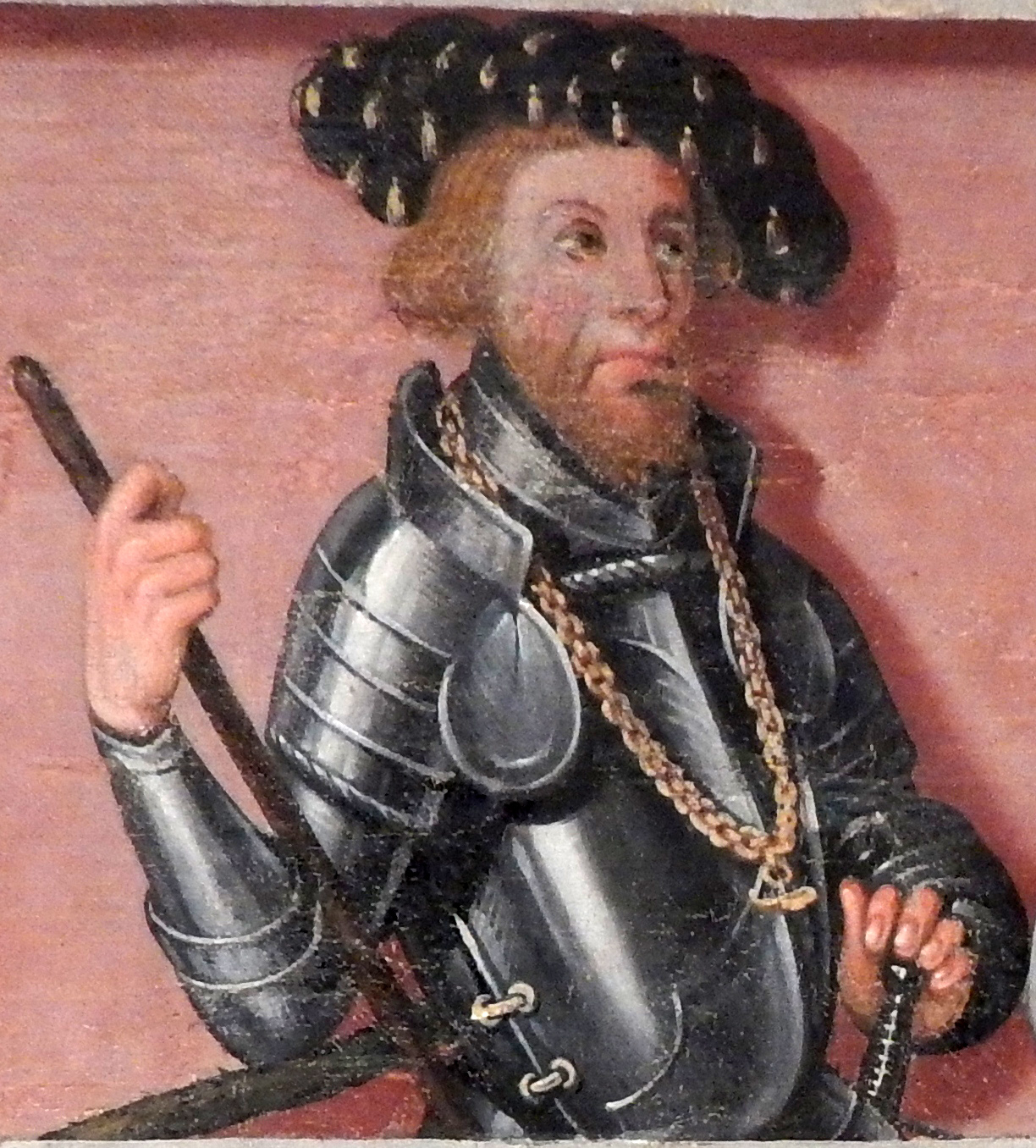
- Depiction on the Family tree of the House of Pomerania

Duke of Pomerania-Wolgast-Barth
- Reign: 17 April 1457 – 17 December 1478
- Predecessor: Bogislaw IX
- Successor: Bogislaw X
- Born: 1435
- Died: 17 December 1478 (aged 42–43); Franzburg
- Spouse: Elizabeth of Brandenburg; Magdalena of Mecklenburg
- Issue: Swantibor V Ertmar
Names
- German: Wartislaw X. von Pommern; Polish: Warcisław X bardowski
- House: House of Griffin
- Father: Wartislaw IX, Duke of Pomerania
- Mother: Sophia of Saxe-Lauenburg

Duke Wartislaw X of Pomerania (1435 – 17 December 1478) was the second son of Duke Wartislaw IX of Pomerania and his wife, Sophia of Saxe-Lauenburg.

Wartislaw married twice. On 5 March 1454, he married Elizabeth of Brandenburg, the widow of the Duke Joachim II "the Younger" of Pomerania-Stettin and daughter of Margrave John of the Neumark. She died in early 1465. They had two sons: Swantibor V and Ertmar, both died of the plague in 1464 at an early age.

Wartislaw's second wife was Magdalena of Mecklenburg, the daughter of Henry, Duke of Mecklenburg-Stargard. This marriage was childless. After Wartislaw's death, Magdalena married Count Burkhard of Barby-Mühlingen.

In 1458, Wartislaw's father died and he and his older brother, Eric II began jointly ruling Pomerania. They quickly got into a dispute over the inheritance and succession of Pomerania-Stolp and Pomerania-Rügenwalde. Eric had married princess Sophia, the daughter of Duke Bogislaw IX and after the death in 1459 of Eric of Pomerania, the last duke of Further Pomerania, wanted to rule Further Pomerania alone. Wartislaw wanted to rule Further Pomerania jointly, while Elector Frederick II of Brandenburg claimed Further Pomerania on behalf of his ward, the minor Otto III of Pomerania-Stettin.

In 1464, Otto III died of the plague. With his death, the Pomerania-Stettin line of the House of Griffins died out. Frederick II then claimed that Pomerania-Stettin was a completed fief of Brandenburg, and that it should fall back to Brandenburg, while Eric II and Wartislaw held that Pomerania-Stettin should fall to the surviving line of the House of Griffins. This led to a conflict known as the Stettin War of Succession. Wartislaw X showed himself as an implacable opponent of the Hohenzollerns. His first wife, Elisabeth, who was herself a Hohenzollern, left him and this was used as ammunition by the Hohenzollerns in their propaganda war against the Pomeranian dukes. Due to Wartislaw's intransigence, a compromise with the Hohenzollerns was only possible after his death. In 1479, his nephew Bogislaw X, Duke of Pomerania, negotiated the Peace of Prenzlau. This treaty confirmed an agreement from 1472, that Wartislaw had approved. The key points were that the Dukes in Wolgast were allowed to keep Pomerania-Stettin, but had to accept that they were vassals of Brandenburg and held Pomerania as a fief. Wartislaw' opposition had been directed mainly against this last provision. After Wartislaw's death, Bogislaw X reunited all part of Pomerania and ruled the Duchy for almost fifty years. In the end, he also successfully challenged the status of Pomerania as a fief of Brandenburg. The issue was finally settled by Bogislaw's sons George I and Barnim XI in the Treaty of Grimnitz of 1529.

Wartislaw died in 1478 and was buried in the monastery at Neuenkamp, which later evolved into the city of Franzburg.

== Ancestors ==
Ancestors of Wartislaw X

16. Barnim IV, Duke of Pomerania
8. Wartislaw VI, Duke of Pomerania
17. Sophie of Werle
4. Barnim VI, Duke of Pomerania
18. John I, Duke of Mecklenburg-Stargard
9. Anne of Mecklenburg-Stargard
19. Anna of Pinneberg and Schauenburg
2. Wartislaw IX, Duke of Pomerania
20. John II of Nuremberg
10. Frederick V, Burgrave of Nuremberg
21. Elisabeth of Henneberg
5. Veronica of Hohenzollern
22. Frederick II, Margrave of Meissen
11. Elisabeth of Meissen
23. Matilda of Bavaria
1. Wartislaw X, Duke of Pomerania
24. Eric I, Duke of Saxe-Lauenburg
12. Eric II, Duke of Saxe-Lauenburg
25. Elisabeth of Pomerania-Wolgast
6. Eric IV, Duke of Saxe-Lauenburg
26. John III, Count of Holstein-Plön
13. Agnes of Holstein-Plön
27. Catherine of Silesia-Glogau
3. Sophia of Saxe-Lauenburg
28. Magnus the Pious, Duke of Brunswick-Lüneburg
14. Magnus II, Duke of Brunswick-Lüneburg
29. Sophie of Brandenburg-Stendal
7. Sophia of Brunswick-Wolfenbüttel
30. Bernhard III, Prince of Anhalt-Bernburg
15. Catherine of Anhalt-Bernburg
31. Agnes of Saxony

== References and sources ==
- Max Bär (1896). "Wartislav X." . Allgemeine Deutsche Biographie (in German). Vol. 41. Leipzig: Duncker & Humblot. pp. 213–214.

Wartislaw X House of Pomerania Born: 1435 Died: 17 December 1478
Preceded by Wartislaw IX	Duke of Pomerania; 1458–1478; With: Eric II	Succeeded by Bogislav X
