= John, Margrave of Brandenburg-Kulmbach =

Margrave of Brandenburg-Kulmbach

John "the Alchemist"
- Margrave of Brandenburg-Kulmbach
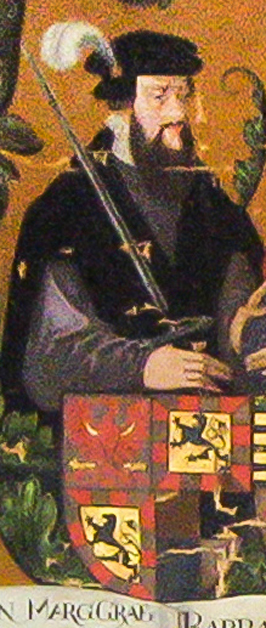
- Born: 1406
- Died: 16 November 1464 (aged 57–58); Baiersdorf
- Noble family: House of Hohenzollern
- Spouse: Barbara of Saxe-Wittenberg
- Issue: Rudolf of Brandenburg; Barbara Gonzaga, Marchioness of Mantua; Elisabeth, Duchess of Pomerania; Dorothea, Queen of Denmark
- Father: Frederick I, Margrave of Brandenburg
- Mother: Elisabeth of Bavaria-Landshut

John, nicknamed the Alchemist (German: Johann der Alchimist; 1406 – 16 November 1464) was a Margrave of Brandenburg-Kulmbach and served as the peace-loving Margrave of Brandenburg after the abdication of his father, Frederick I, the first member of the House of Hohenzollern to rule Brandenburg.

== Biography ==
John was the eldest son of Frederick I, Margrave of Brandenburg (1371–1440), and Elisabeth of Bavaria-Landshut (1383–1442), daughter of Frederick, Duke of Bavaria, and his second wife Maddalena Visconti.

After marrying Barbara of Saxe-Wittenberg (1405–1465), daughter of Rudolf III, Duke of Saxe-Wittenberg, John hoped to eventually succeed to Saxe-Wittenberg once its line of Ascanian dukes died out. When this happened in November 1422, however, Emperor Sigismund was on poorer terms with the Hohenzollerns and was only willing to compensate John with a monetary payment.

John began participating in governmental affairs in Brandenburg in 1424. Frustrated by disputes with the feudal nobility, Frederick I retired to his castle at Cadolzburg in Franconia in 1425, granting the regency of Brandenburg to John at a Landtag in Rathenow on 13 January 1426, while retaining the electoral dignity for himself.

John was poorly received by the populace of Brandenburg, as his administration was incompetent, leading to unrest in the countryside. Rather than governing, John was more interested in artificially creating gold through alchemy, thereby receiving the cognomen "the Alchemist". In 1433, a revised version of the alchemical treatise Buch der heiligen Dreifaltigkeit of Ulmannus was prepared for John. Realizing the danger Brandenburg was in, Frederick I granted John Franconian lands in Brandenburg-Kulmbach on 7 June 1437, territory rich with mines that furnished materials for the Alchemist's hobby. The governance of Brandenburg passed to Frederick I's second-oldest son, Frederick II.

After the death of Frederick I in 1440, John inherited all of Brandenburg-Kulmbach, including the castle of Plassenburg in Kulmbach. In his later years, he allowed Christopher of Bavaria to administer his possessions in the Upper Palatinate until Christopher's death in 1448. John ruled as Margrave of Brandenburg-Kulmbach until abdicating in 1457, which allowed him to dedicate himself toward studying alchemy and the environs of Franconia. He died in Castle Scharfeneck near Baiersdorf in 1464.

== Family and children ==
John of Brandenburg-Kulmbach and Barbara of Saxe-Wittenberg had four children:

- Rudolf of Brandenburg (born and died in 1424)
- Barbara of Brandenburg (1423 – 7 November 1481), married on 12 November 1433 Ludovico III Gonzaga, Marquis of Mantua
- Elisabeth of Brandenburg (1425 – after 13 January 1465); married, firstly, on 27 August 1440, Joachim, Duke of Pomerania. Married, secondly, on 5 March 1454, Wartislaw X, Duke of Pomerania.
- Dorothea of Brandenburg (1431 – 10 November 1495); married, firstly, on 12 September 1445, King Christopher III of Denmark. Married, secondly, on 28 October 1449, King Christian I of Denmark

== Sources ==
- Imsen, Steinar (2002). "Late Medieval Scandinavian Queenship". In Duggan, Anne (ed.). Queens and Queenship in Medieval Europe: Proceedings of a Conference Held at King's College London, April 1995. The Boydell Press. pp. 53–74. ISBN 9780851158815.
- Lazzarini, Isabella (2015). Communication and Conflict: Italian Diplomacy in the Early Renaissance, 1350-1520. Oxford University Press. ISBN 9780191040856.

John, Margrave of Brandenburg-Kulmbach House of Hohenzollern Born: 1406 Died: 16 November 1464
Preceded by Frederick I	Margrave of Brandenburg; 1426–1440	Succeeded by Frederick II
Preceded by Frederick I	Margrave of Brandenburg-Kulmbach; 1440–1457	Succeeded by Albrecht Achilles
