= Rudolf III of Saxe-Wittenberg =

Elector of Saxony from 1388 to 1419

Rudolf III
- Duke of Saxe-Wittenberg
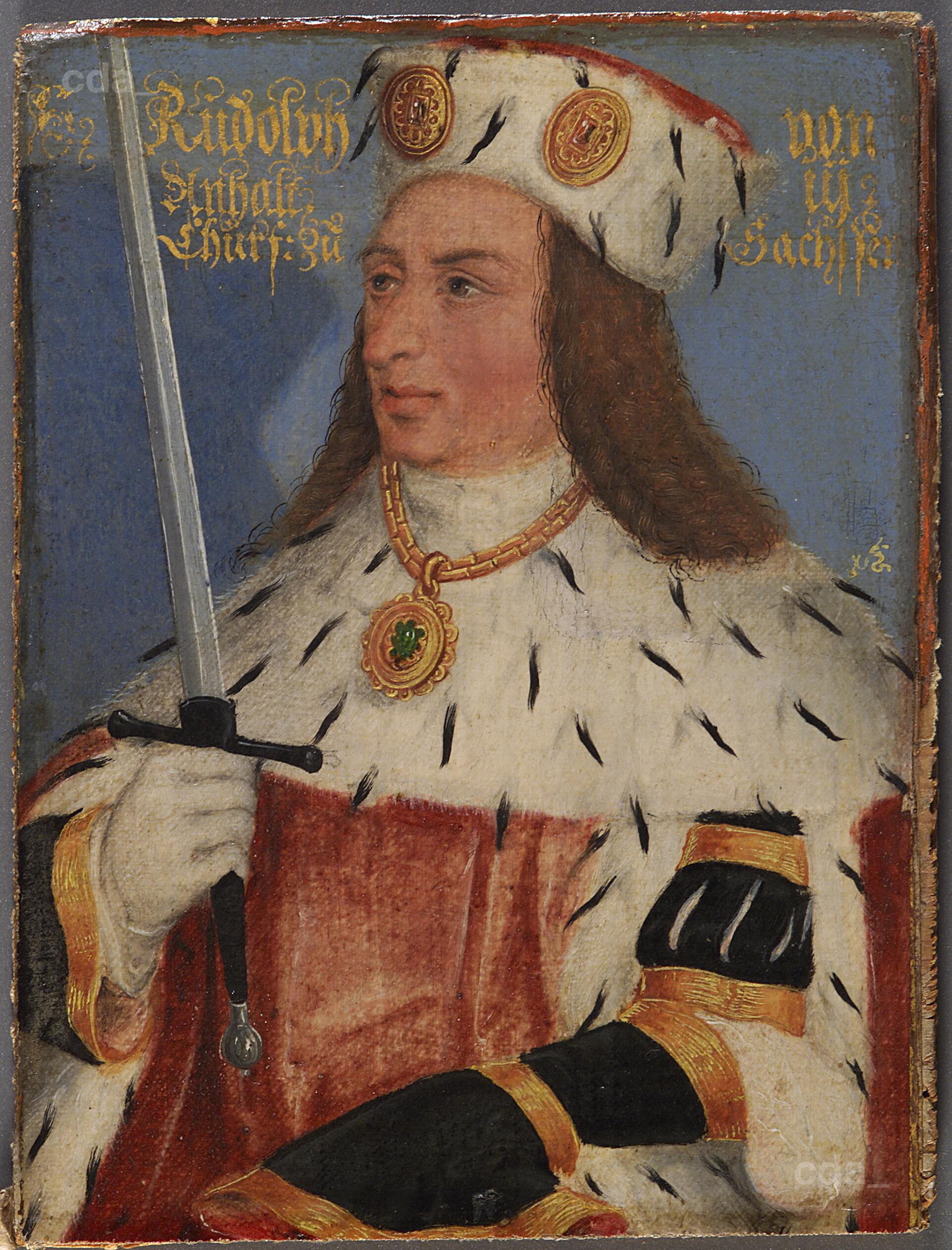
- Portrait by Lucas Cranach the Younger

Elector of Saxony
- Reign: 1388–1419
- Predecessor: Wenceslaus I
- Successor: Albert III
- Born: c. 1378; Wittenberg, Saxony
- Died: 11 June 1419; Bohemia
- Burial: Franciscan monastery in Wittenberg
- Spouse: Anna of Meissen; Barbara of Legnica
- House: Ascania
- Father: Wenceslaus I, Duke of Saxe-Wittenberg
- Mother: Cecilia of Carrara

Rudolf III (c. 1378 – 11 June 1419), a member of the House of Ascania, was Duke of Saxe-Wittenberg and Elector of Saxony from 1388 until his death.

== Life ==
He was probably born at the Saxon Wittenberg residence, the eldest son of Duke Wenceslaus I of Saxe-Wittenberg and his wife Cecilia, daughter of Francesco I da Carrara, Lord of Padua.

Rudolf III took up government after his father's sudden death on 15 May 1388. Rudolf was involved in a long-running dispute with the Archbishopric of Magdeburg. He donated numerous gifts to the Wittenberg All Saints' Church.

Like his father, Rudolf was a loyal supporter of the Imperial House of Luxembourg. In 1419, Emperor Sigismund sent him to Bohemia, in order to quash the Hussite uprising that had begun with the Defenestration of Prague. He died on his way there, probably after being poisoned.

Rudolf was buried in the Franciscan monastery in Wittenberg. His coffin was moved to the crypt of the Wittenberg All Saints' Church in the 19th century, and to the family grave during the Second World War. As he had outlived his male heirs, he was succeeded by his younger brother Albert III.

== Marriage and issue ==
About 1387/89 Rudolf married with Anna of Meissen (d. 4 July 1395), a daughter of the Wettin landgrave Balthasar of Thuringia and secondly in March 1396 with Barbara (d. 17 May 1435), daughter of the Piast duke Rupert I of Legnica.

He had five children:

- Scholastica (1393–1463), married Duke Jan I of Żagań
- Rudolph (d. 1406),
- Wenceslas (d. 1407),
- Siegmund (d. 1407),
- Barbara (1405–1465), married Margrave John of Brandenburg-Kulmbach

Rudolf III of Saxe-Wittenberg House of Ascania Born: c. 1373 Died: 11 June 1419
Regnal titles
Preceded by Wenceslaus I	Elector of Saxony; 1388–1419	Succeeded by Albert III
