= Duchy of Gifhorn =

German duchy (1539–1549)

The Duchy of Gifhorn (German: Herzogtum Gifhorn) with its residence at Gifhorn Castle was founded in 1539 and lasted only 10 years until the death of its ruler, Duke Francis of Brunswick-Lüneburg in 1549. It consisted of the Ämter of Gifhorn, Fallersleben and Isenhagen Abbey.

== Foundation ==
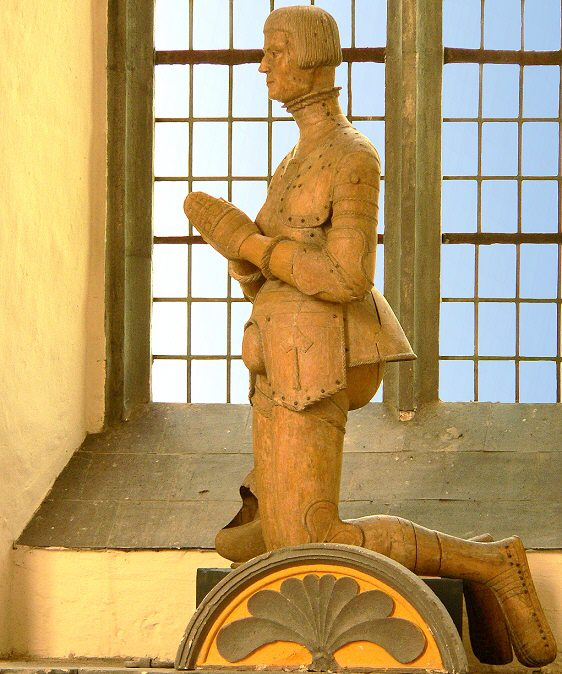
Statue of the praying Duke Francis in the castle chapel at Gifhorn

The duchy was founded when Duke Francis of Brunswick-Lüneburg returned in 1536 after many years at the court of the Electorate of Saxony in Wittenberg. He demanded from his older brother, Duke Ernest of Brunswick-Lüneburg (known as the Confessor due to his espousal of Lutheran doctrine), to have his own duchy as an inheritance and pressed for a division of the state. Because his demands for the entire eastern half of the dukedom were unacceptable, not least due to the serious debt carried by the state, he was given the Ämter of Gifhorn, Fallersleben and Isenhagen Abbey, near Hankensbüttel, in 1539. Although Francis tried to achieve full sovereignty for his domain, considerable regalia remained with the ducal house in Celle. For example, Celle was responsible for the foreign policy issues and the Gifhorn nobility remained part of the Lüneburg estate.

== Expansion ==
The Duchy of Gifhorn was a small, easily managed lordship, in which Duke Francis could indulge freely in his noble image of himself and attend to his princely representational duties. He had been impressed by such a lifestyle during his many years at the court of the Saxon Elector in Wittenberg. In 1525 he started to expand Gifhorn Castle into his royal Residenz. Courtly life was characterised by the ostentation of great princely courts; he served food and drink in expensive Venetian glasses, arranged knightly tournaments and royal hunts, employed a court jester and a court chancellor (Hofkanzler). At the same time he built Fallersleben Castle as his rural estate.

== End ==
His marriage in 1547 to Clara of Saxe-Lauenburg at Ratzeburg only lasted three years because the duke died at the age of 41 from a wound infection. He was interred in the chapel at Gifhorn Castle, where there is still a carved tomb figure on his sarcophagus. His wife, the Duchess Clara, was given Fallersleben Castle as her dowager home as compensation. Because Duke Francis left no male heir, the Duchy of Gifhorn went back to the Principality of Lüneburg.
