= Uelzen =

Uelzen Ülz'n (Low German)
- Town
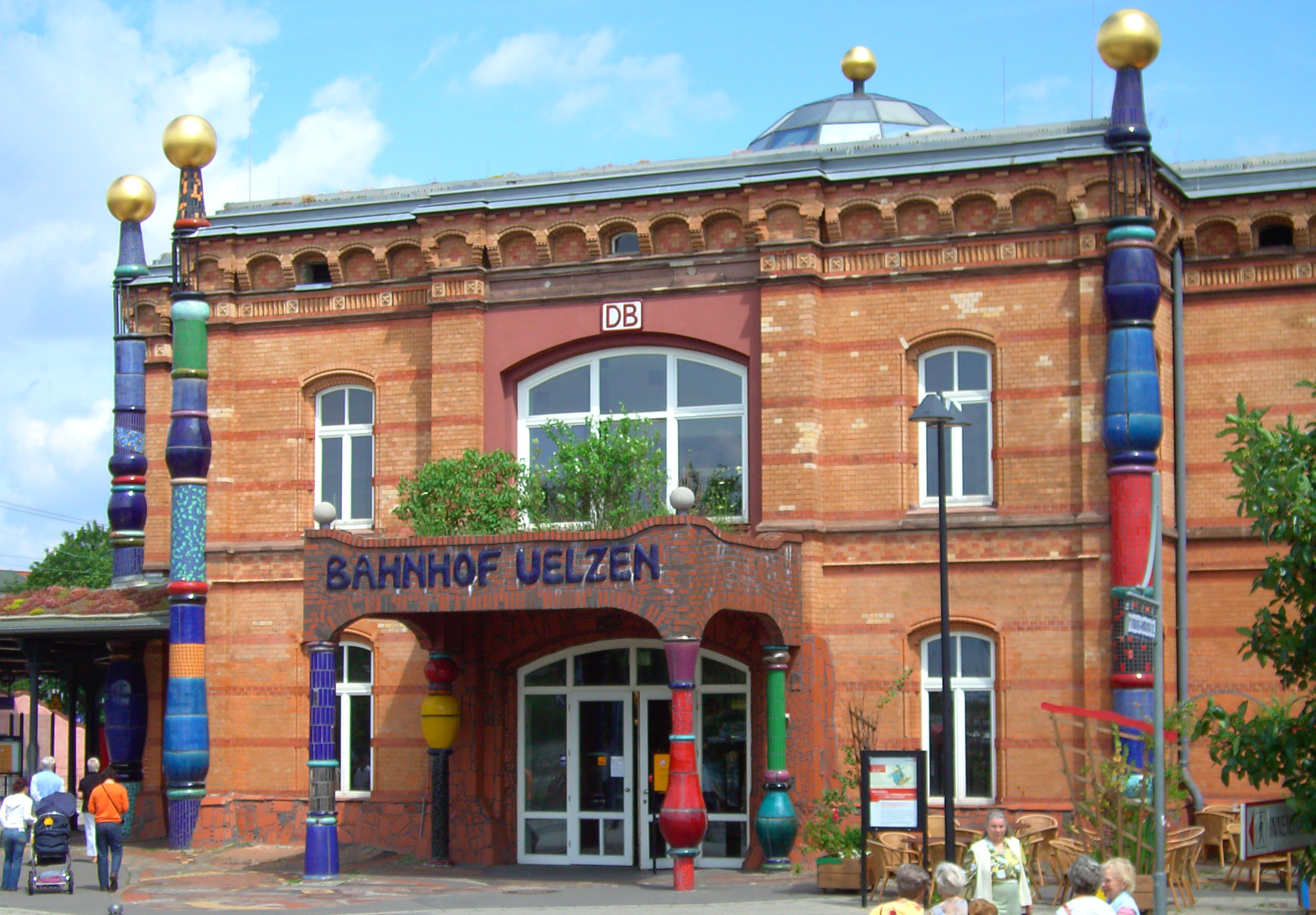
- Hundertwasser Station Uelzen

- Coat of arms

- Location of Uelzen within Uelzen district
- Interactive map of Uelzen
- Location within Germany Location within Lower Saxony
- Coordinates: 52°57′53″N 10°33′57″E
- Country: Germany
- State: Lower Saxony
- District: Uelzen
- Subdivisions: 16 districts

Government
  - Mayor (2021–26): Jürgen Markwardt (SPD)

Area
  - Total: 136.84 km^{2} (52.83 sq mi)
- Elevation: 43 m (141 ft)

Population (2025-12-31)
  - Total: 32,703
  - Density: 238.99/km^{2} (618.97/sq mi)
- Time zone: UTC+01:00 (CET)
  - Summer (DST): UTC+02:00 (CEST)
- Postal codes: 29525
- Dialling codes: 0581
- Vehicle registration: UE
- Website: www.uelzen.de

Uelzen (German: [ˈʏltsn̩]; Low German: Ülz'n), officially the Hanseatic City of Uelzen (German: Hansestadt Uelzen), is a town in northeast Lower Saxony, Germany, and capital of the district of Uelzen. It is part of the Hamburg Metropolitan Region, a Hanseatic town and an independent municipality.

Uelzen is characterised by timber-framed architecture and also has some striking examples of North German brick Gothic. The town earned pan-regional fame when Friedensreich Hundertwasser was selected to redesign the railway station: the final work of the celebrated Viennese artist and architect was ceremonially opened in 2000 as the Hundertwasser Station, Uelzen, and remains a popular tourism destination.

The Polabian name for Uelzen is Wilcaus (spelled Wiltzaus in older German reference material), possibly derived from wilca or wilsa (< Slavic *olăša) 'alder'.

== History ==
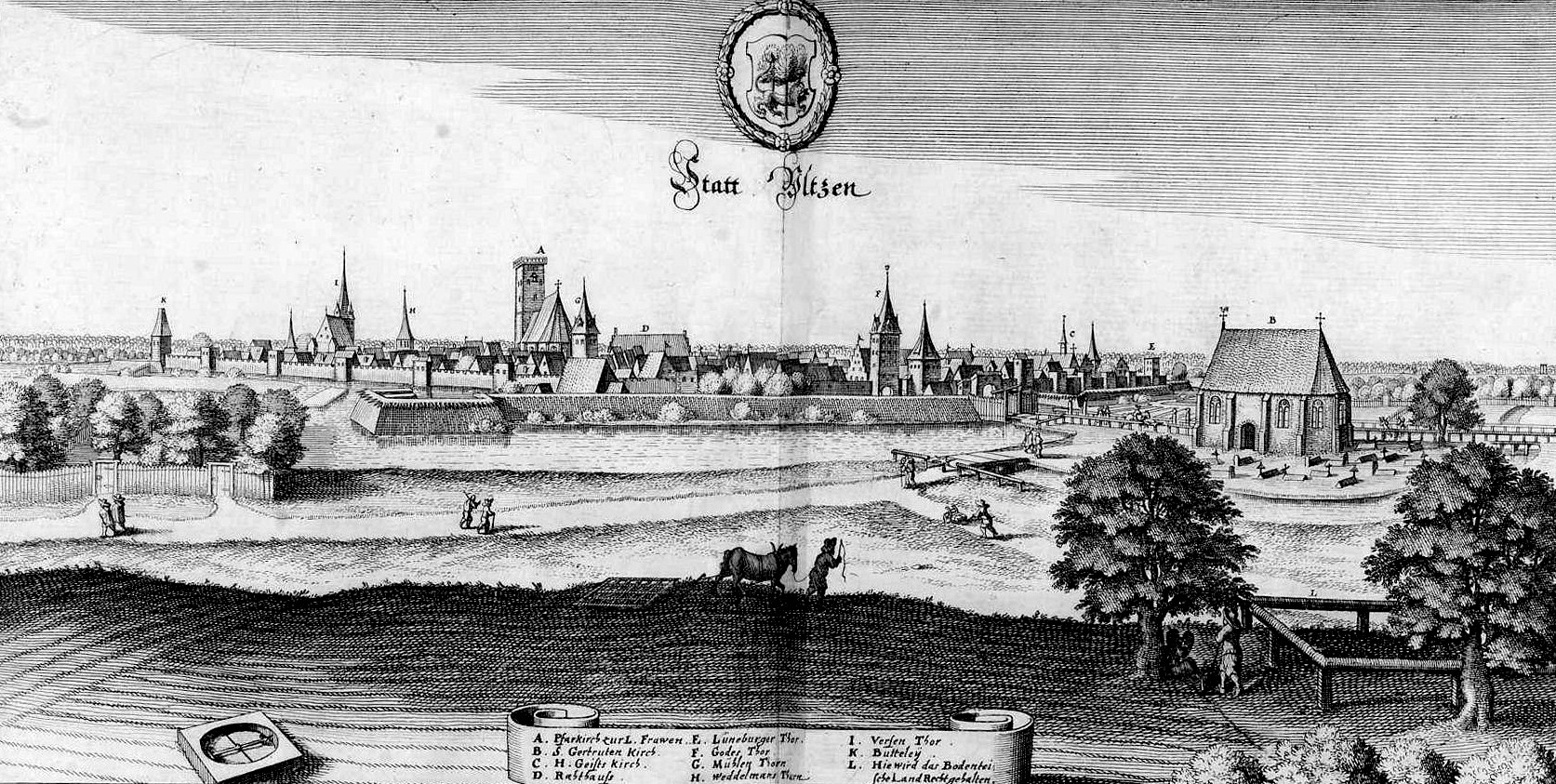
Uelzen by Matthäus Merian the Younger, about 1654

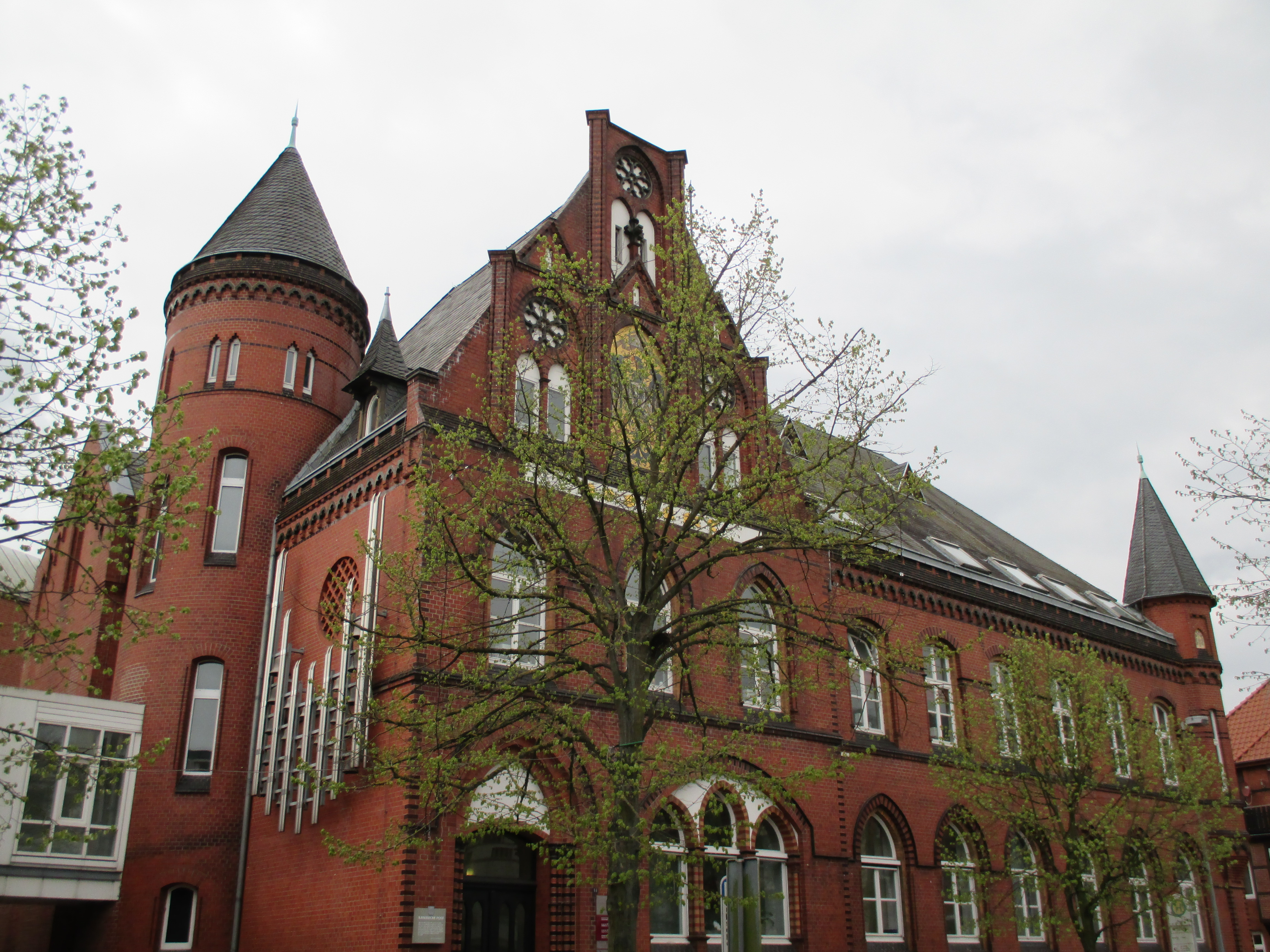
Old post office building

The town was founded in 1250. In 1270 Duke John of Brunswick-Lüneburg, a Welf who ruled the Principality of Lüneburg from 1252 to 1277, granted Uelzen its town privileges (Stadtrechte). In the Middle Ages it became an active member of the Hanseatic League. The town fortification, built in the 14th century, originally had three gates, a wall, and a moat. Parts of the wall are still standing.

While Uelzen only played a small role in the Hanseatic League, there is evidence that it traded with Livonia and Spain. At the Schnellenmarket, a London trading office purchased Uelzener linen, earthenware pitchers were offered for sale and brewery business flourished. On 21 October 1470, Uelzen was the venue for a Hanseatic League Convention. This was a special honor, as these annual resolutions of the association of cities usually took place in Lübeck.

The town became part of the Electorate of Hanover in 1708, the Kingdom of Westphalia in 1807, the Kingdom of Hanover in 1814, and the Prussian Province of Hanover in 1866.

Uelzen was the site of a Nazi concentration camp that operated in Uelzen until 17 April 1945. The camp was a subcamp of the Neuengamme concentration camp.

Uelzen was hit by five air raids during World War II, on 18 April 1944, 10 November 1944, 27 November 1944, 22 February 1945 and 7 April 1945. Across these raids, 1362 buildings were destroyed or damaged. The heaviest raid was on 22 February 1945 when 149 people lost their lives and 95 houses were completely destroyed. On 18 April 1944, three civilians were killed and 153 houses were destroyed or damaged. Estimates indicate up to 27% of the town was destroyed at some point during the war.

== Geography ==
=== Location ===
Uelzen lies on the eastern edge of the Lüneburg Heath. The town is a transport hub on the north–south axis from Hamburg to Hanover as well as the east–west axis from Bremen to Berlin. Also of economic importance is its location on the Elbe Lateral Canal. The town is situated on the Ilmenau, and the banks in Uelzen are dotted with small parks wetland areas. Large areas in the vicinity of Uelzen have been set aside as nature parks with moors, woods, lakes, and heathland: the Elbhöhen-Wendland Nature Park, Lüneburg Heath Nature Park and Lower Saxon Elbe Valley Water Meadows Biosphere Reserve.

=== Divisions ===
The following parishes belong to the borough of Uelzen: Groß Liedern, Halligdorf, Hambrock, Hansen, Hanstedt II, Holdenstedt, Kirchweyhe, Klein Süstedt, Masendorf, Mehre, Molzen, Oldenstadt, Riestedt, Ripdorf, Tatern, Veerßen, Westerweyhe, and Woltersburg.

Furthermore, there are four other places that have the status of "special parishes" (Sonstige Ortsteile): Borne, Kl. Liedern, Pieperhöfen, and Oldenstadt-West.

=== Climate ===
Uelzen has a typical oceanic climate (Köppen: Cfb; Trewartha: Dobk). The average temperature ranges from 1 °C (34 °F) in winter to 18 °C (64 °F) in summer, with precipitation concentrated from May to August. On average, there are 11 days with a maximum temperature of over 30 °C (86 °F) per year, and high temperatures of over 35 °C (95 °F) occur every four years on average.

The Uelzen weather station has recorded the following extreme values:

- Highest Temperature 39.8 °C (103.6 °F) on 20 July 2022.
- Warmest Minimum 20.6 °C (69.1 °F) on 27 June 2026.
- Coldest Maximum −15.1 °C (4.8 °F) on 1 February 1956.
- Lowest Temperature −26.4 °C (−15.5 °F) on 24 February 1956.
- Highest Daily Precipitation 73.9 mm (2.91 in) on 29 June 2024.
- Wettest Month 157.3 mm (6.19 in) in June 1953.
- Wettest Year 1,026.7 mm (40.42 in) in 2023.
- Driest Year 268.8 mm (10.58 in) in 1959.
- Earliest Snowfall: 7 November 1968.
- Latest Snowfall: 29 April 1985.
- Longest annual sunshine: 1,961.8 hours in 1959.
- Shortest annual sunshine: 1,228.5 hours in 1978.

Climate data for Uelzen, 1991−2020 normals, extremes 1951-present
Month	Jan	Feb	Mar	Apr	May	Jun	Jul	Aug	Sep	Oct	Nov	Dec	Year
Record high °C (°F)	16.4 (61.5)	19.1 (66.4)	24.5 (76.1)	29.3 (84.7)	32.7 (90.9)	39.4 (102.9)	39.8 (103.6)	38.0 (100.4)	32.0 (89.6)	27.5 (81.5)	20.1 (68.2)	16.4 (61.5)	39.8 (103.6)
Mean maximum °C (°F)	10.7 (51.3)	11.7 (53.1)	16.8 (62.2)	23.7 (74.7)	27.4 (81.3)	30.2 (86.4)	31.9 (89.4)	32.0 (89.6)	26.5 (79.7)	21.0 (69.8)	15.0 (59.0)	11.6 (52.9)	33.9 (93.0)
Mean daily maximum °C (°F)	3.8 (38.8)	4.5 (40.1)	8.8 (47.8)	14.9 (58.8)	18.5 (65.3)	21.8 (71.2)	24.3 (75.7)	23.5 (74.3)	19.4 (66.9)	13.9 (57.0)	8.0 (46.4)	5.0 (41.0)	13.9 (57.0)
Daily mean °C (°F)	1.5 (34.7)	1.5 (34.7)	4.6 (40.3)	9.2 (48.6)	12.9 (55.2)	16.1 (61.0)	18.4 (65.1)	17.5 (63.5)	13.9 (57.0)	9.6 (49.3)	5.3 (41.5)	2.8 (37.0)	9.4 (48.9)
Mean daily minimum °C (°F)	−1.1 (30.0)	−1.6 (29.1)	0.4 (32.7)	3.4 (38.1)	6.9 (44.4)	10.1 (50.2)	12.3 (54.1)	11.9 (53.4)	8.8 (47.8)	5.5 (41.9)	2.5 (36.5)	0.4 (32.7)	5.0 (41.0)
Mean minimum °C (°F)	−9.8 (14.4)	−9.2 (15.4)	−6.1 (21.0)	−2.9 (26.8)	−0.5 (31.1)	4.7 (40.5)	7.3 (45.1)	6.3 (43.3)	2.6 (36.7)	−1.5 (29.3)	−3.8 (25.2)	−7.4 (18.7)	−12.5 (9.5)
Record low °C (°F)	−25.1 (−13.2)	−26.4 (−15.5)	−20.0 (−4.0)	−9.4 (15.1)	−3.0 (26.6)	1.1 (34.0)	2.7 (36.9)	2.4 (36.3)	−0.8 (30.6)	−5.3 (22.5)	−19.5 (−3.1)	−19.5 (−3.1)	−26.4 (−15.5)
Average precipitation mm (inches)	60.4 (2.38)	41.1 (1.62)	45.7 (1.80)	34.6 (1.36)	55.3 (2.18)	62.8 (2.47)	73.3 (2.89)	61.1 (2.41)	47.9 (1.89)	53.9 (2.12)	50.1 (1.97)	57.3 (2.26)	643.6 (25.34)
Average extreme snow depth cm (inches)	4.0 (1.6)	5.0 (2.0)	3.2 (1.3)	0 (0)	0 (0)	0 (0)	0 (0)	0 (0)	0 (0)	0 (0)	1.2 (0.5)	3.2 (1.3)	9.0 (3.5)
Average precipitation days (≥ 0.1 mm)	18.5	16.1	15.0	11.7	13.8	13.7	15.0	16.2	13.9	15.5	16.9	18.7	185.0
Average relative humidity (%)	88.0	85.0	79.4	72.1	72.5	74.2	74.5	77.2	81.7	86.6	90.3	90.1	81.0
Mean monthly sunshine hours	41.7	71.6	130.2	195.5	202.4	212.1	210.3	190.9	163.6	107.0	51.0	32.7	1,609.1
Source: DWD Open Data

== Governance ==
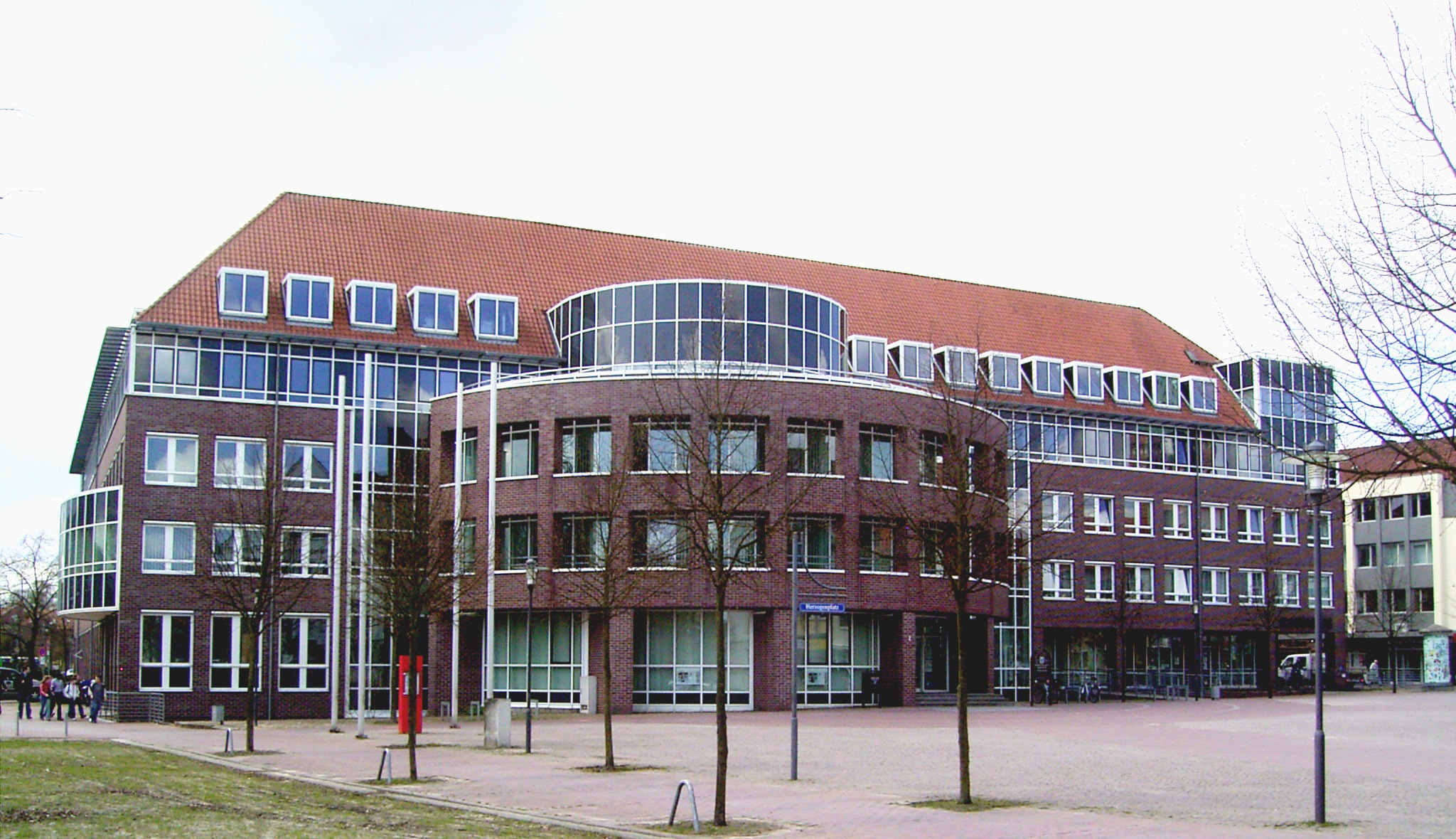
View across the Herzogenplatz to the new Uelzen Town Hall

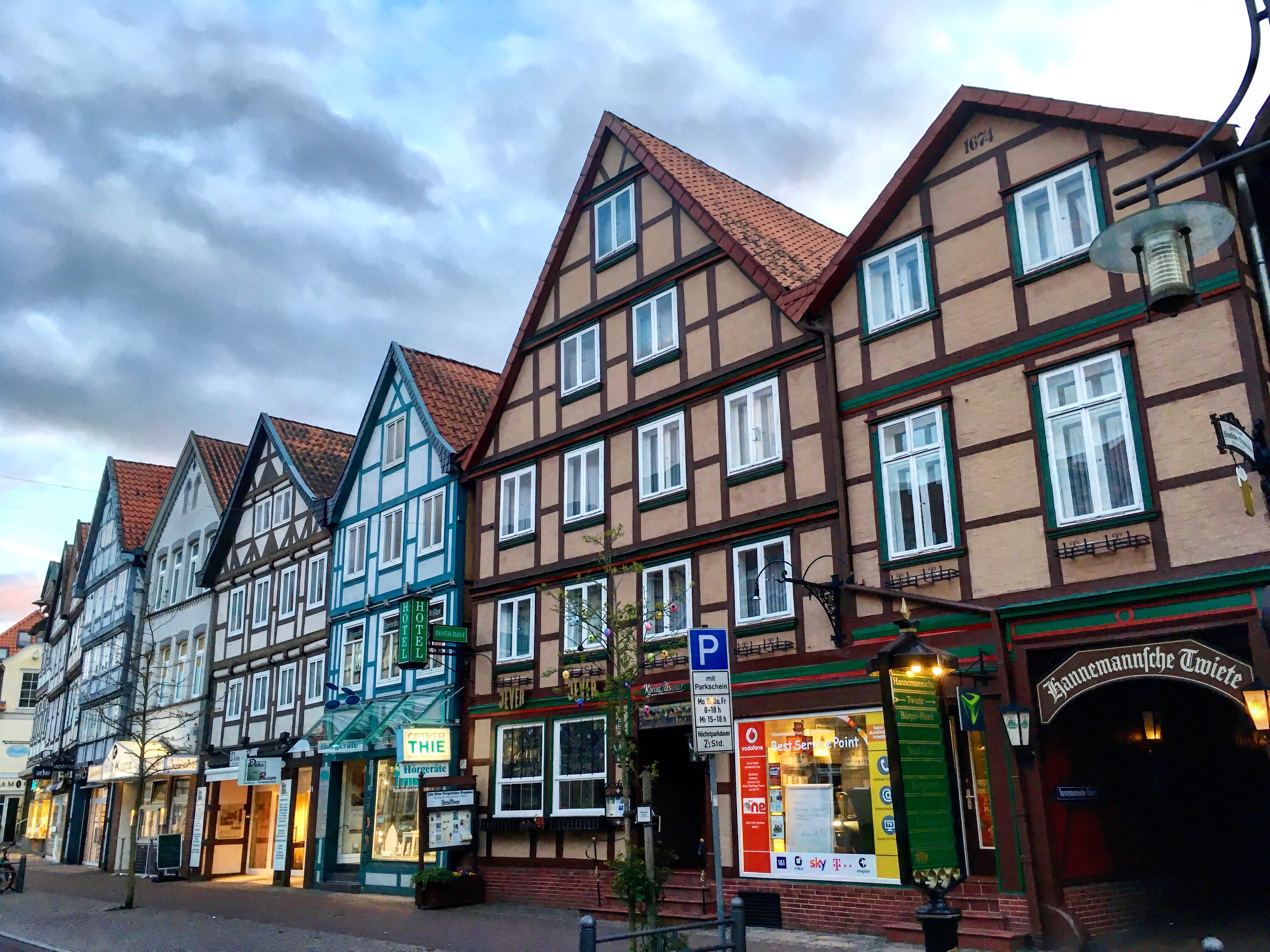
A half-timber house-lined street in Uelzen

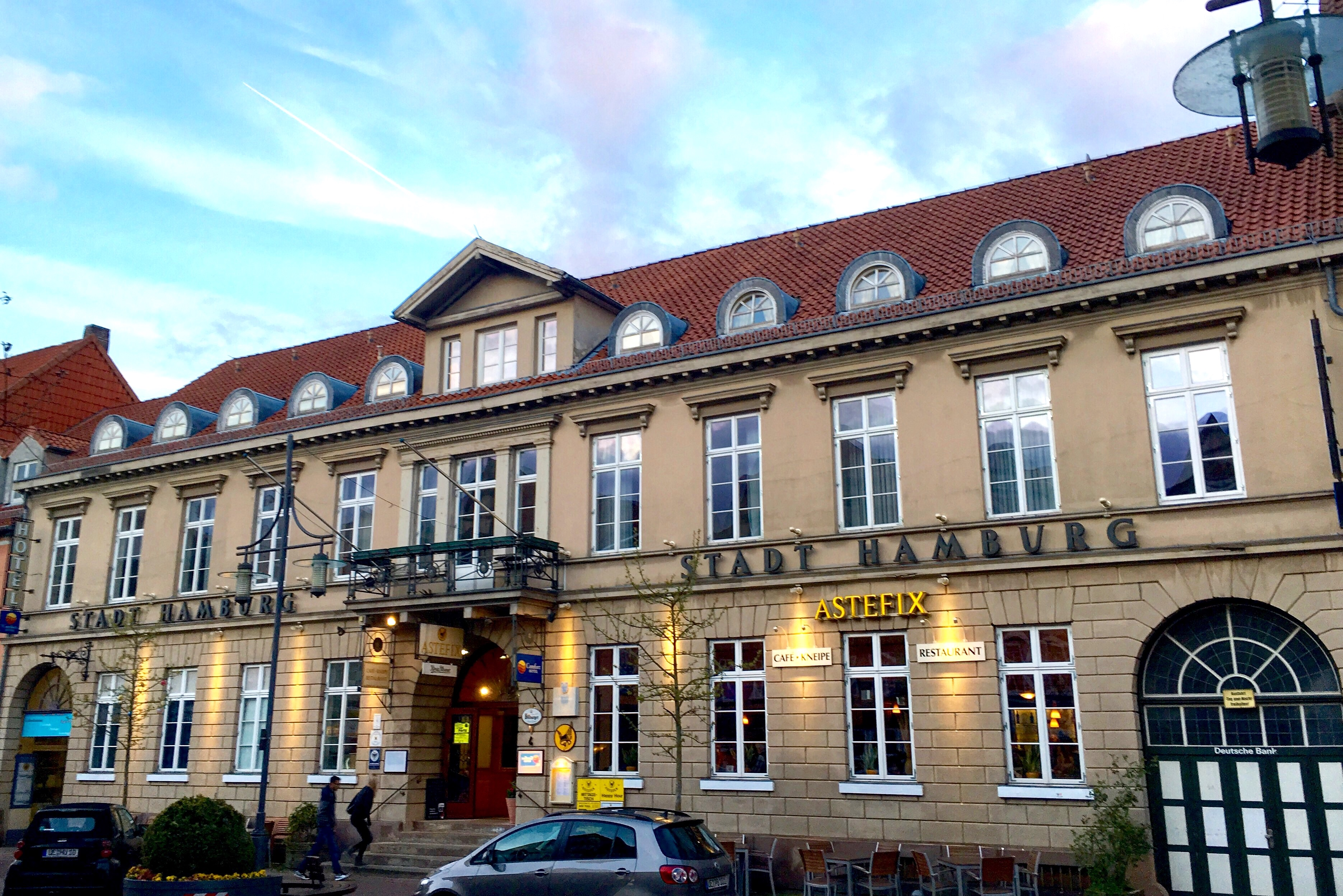
Hotel Stadt Hamburg

Uelzen belongs to the Bundestag constituency of Celle-Uelzen. In 2009 Henning Otte (CDU) was directly elected, having been on the state list (place 19) since 2005. Kirsten Lühmann (SPD) was elected in 2009 via the state list. In the years 1998, 2002 and 2005 Peter Struck (SPD), former defense minister and chairman of the SPD party in the German Bundestag, was directly elected.

=== Mayor ===
Jürgen Markwardt (independent) has been the mayor of Uelzen since 2014, when he was elected with 64.4% of the vote. The deputy mayors are Karsten Jäkel (CDU) and Ariane Schmäschke (The Greens).

- 1913–1946: Johann Maria Farina.
- 1946: Dr. Heinz Lücke (CDU).
- 1946–1948: Adolf Hochgraefe (SPD).
- 1948–1950: Dr. Heinz Lücke.
- 1950–1952: Adolf Hochgraefe.
- 1952–1961: Dr. Heinz Lücke.
- 1961–1963: Adolf Hochgraefe.
- 1963–1964: Dr. Heinz Lücke.
- 1964–1972: Alfred Krüger (CDU).
- 1972–1979: Rudi Schrödter (SPD).
- 1979–1981: Hans-Alexander Drechsler (SPD).
- 1981–1991: Rudolf Froin (CDU).
- 1991–1997: Günter Leifert (SPD).
- 1997–2001: Günter Leifert (hauptamtlich).
- 2001–2014: Otto Lukat (SPD).
- 2014: Jürgen Markwardt (independent).

== Twin towns – sister cities ==
Uelzen is twinned with:

- Barnstaple, England, United Kingdom
- Bois-Guillaume, France
- Kobryn, Belarus
- Tikaré, Burkina Faso

== Arts and culture ==
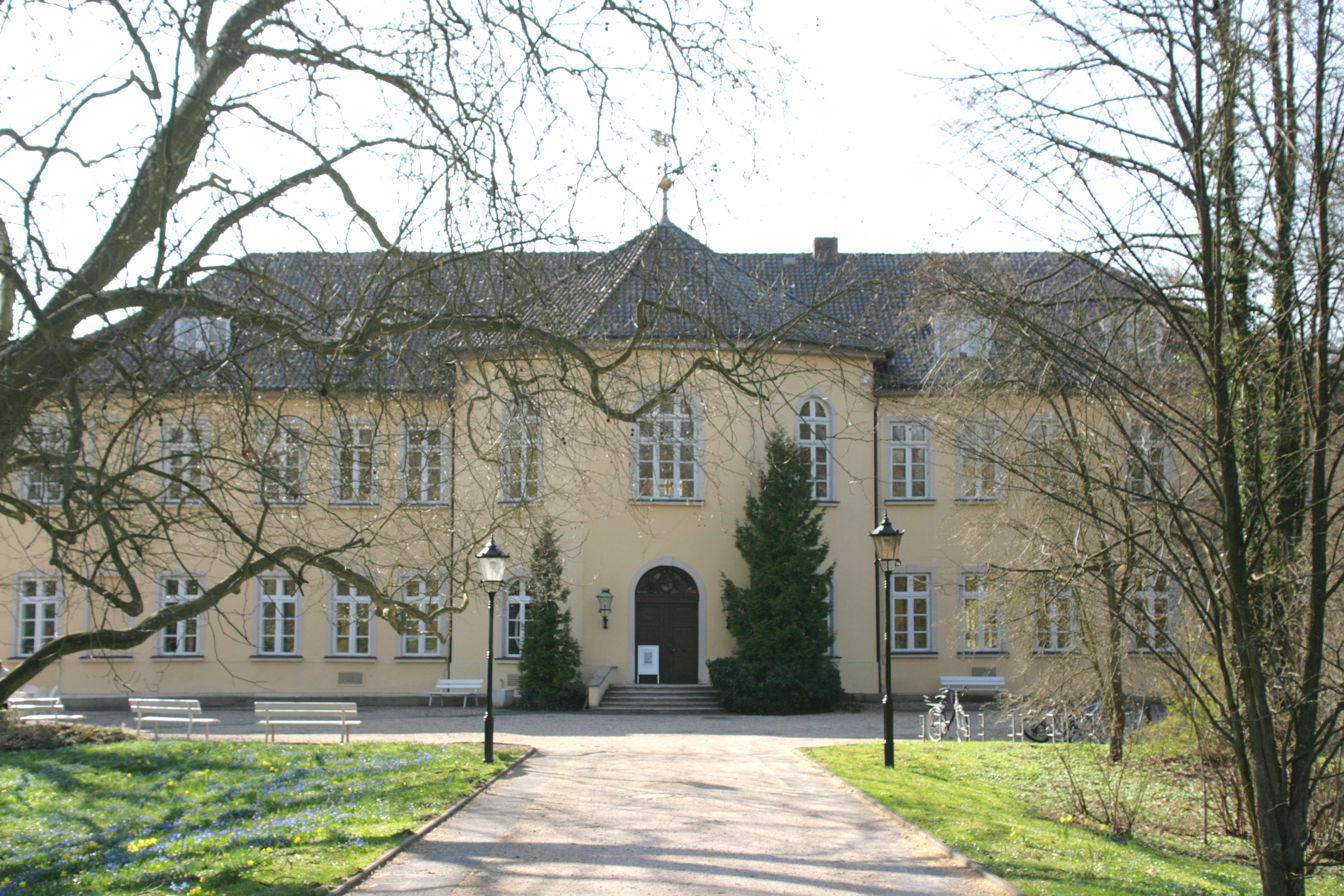
Holdenstedt Castle Museum

=== Theatre ===
Uelzen contains a number of theaters, including the theatre on the Ilmenau, the Jabelmann Events Hall, and the fringe theatre on the Rosenmauer.

=== Museums ===
Worthy of mention is the Holdenstedt Castle Museum which is the town's local history museum. Permanent exhibitions include furniture from the Middle Ages, a glass collection, artwork by painter Georg Wolf, and archaeological finds from the local area.

== Economy ==
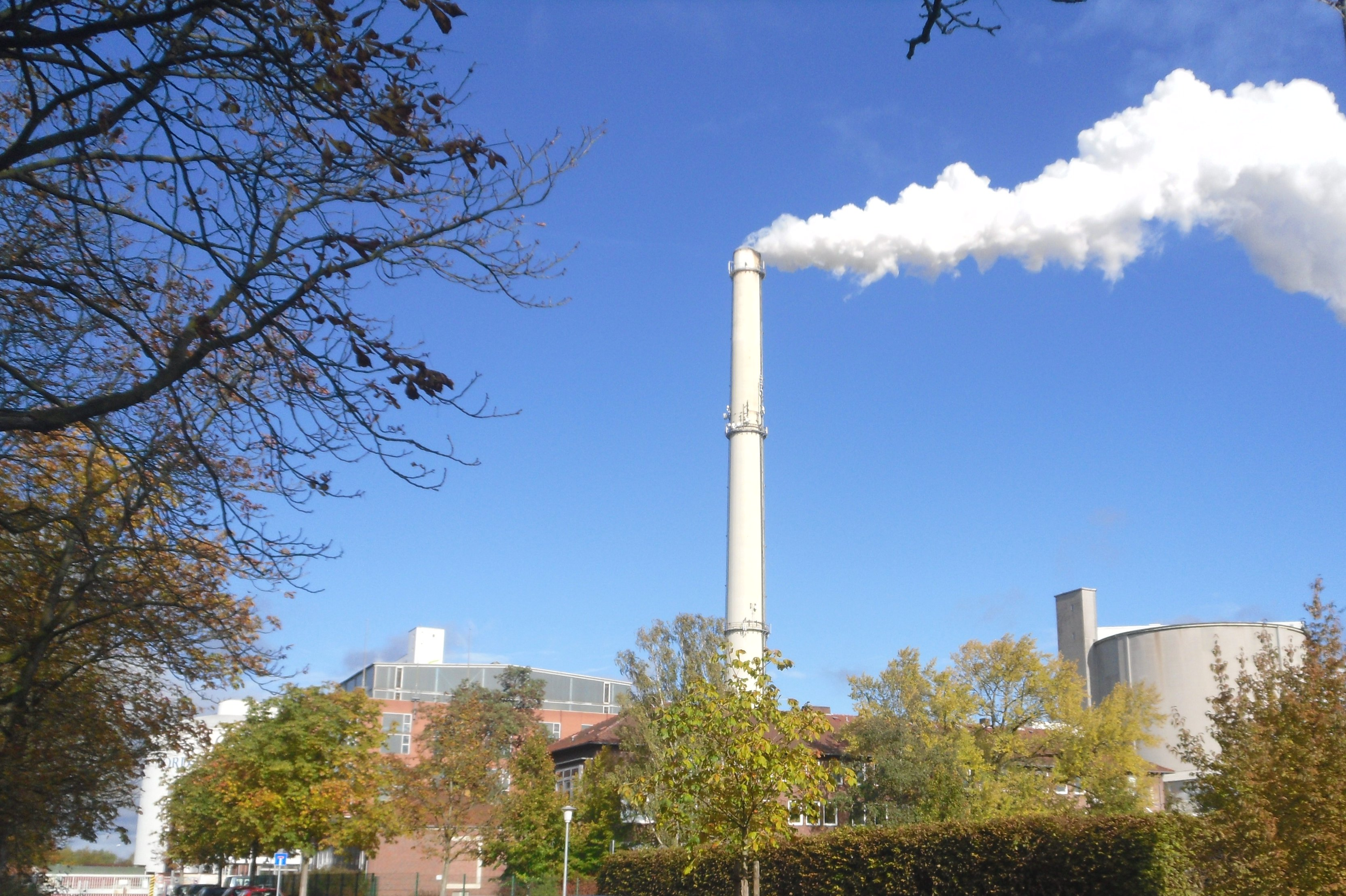
The beet sugar factory in Uelzen

The largest sugar beet refinery in the Nordzucker group is in Uelzen. It processes approximately 20,000 tons of sugar beet per day. Other large employers in the town are Nestlé Schöller or the dairy manufacturer Uelzena. Bituminous roofing felts and insulation material has been manufactured in Uelzen by C. Hasse & Sohn since 1872.

== Infrastructure ==
=== Railway station ===
The Hundertwasserbahnhof is a railway station in Uelzen at the eastern edge of the Lüneburg Heath Nature Park in northeastern Lower Saxony. Cities directly reachable by rail from this hub are Hamburg, Hannover, Lüneburg, Celle, Braunschweig, Bremen and Berlin.

The original station was renovated for Expo 2000 following plans by the Austrian artist and architect Friedensreich Hundertwasser. An "environmentally, culturally oriented" station, the station was renamed after the architect as 'Hundertwasser Station, Uelzen'. Today it is one of the town's popular tourist attractions.

=== Courts ===
Uelzen has a district court (Amtsgericht), which belongs to the state court region of Lüneburg and the Oberlandesgericht (High State Court) region of Celle.

=== Education ===
Schools in Uelzen include the Herzog-Ernst-Gymnasium, Lessing-Gymnasium, Oberschule-Uelzen, Lucas-Backmeister-Schule, Sternschule, Berufsbildene Schulen I and II and 6 elementary schools.

=== Health and medicine ===
Uelzen has one hospital (HELIOS Klinikum), two clinics that specialise in different areas (Klinik Veerßen and Psychiatrische Klinik Uelzen) and some pharmacies and dentists.

== Notable people ==
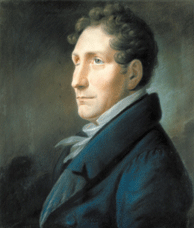
Friedrich Kuhlau, 1828

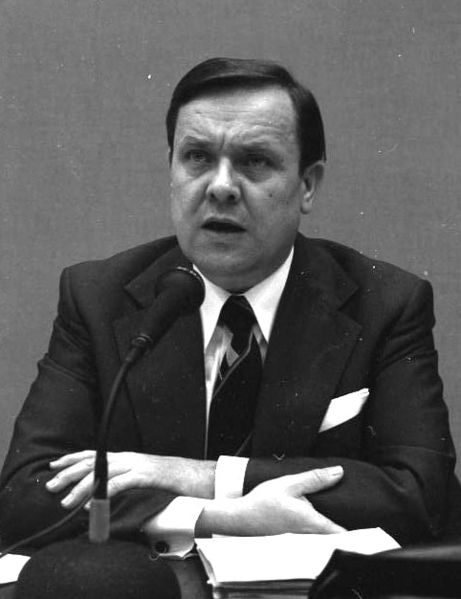
Walter Wallmann, 1974

- Ernest I, Duke of Brunswick (1497–1546), Prince of Lüneburg, ruled the Principality of Lüneburg from 1520.
- Francis, Duke of Brunswick-Lüneburg (1508–1549), ruled the Duchy of Gifhorn from Gifhorn Castle
- Bernhardus Varenius (1622–1650), a German geographer, grew up locally.
- Eberhard August Wilhelm von Zimmermann (1743–1815), geographer and zoologist.
- Friedrich Kuhlau (1786–1832), court composer to the Danish royal court
- Georg Wilding, Fürst von Butera und Radali, (DE Wiki) (1790–1841), royal-Neapolitan envoy in St. Petersburg
- Theodore Kaufmann (1814–1896), American painter.
- Eric Muenter (1871–1915), a German-American political terrorist, activist, spy, professor and would-be assassin.
- Walter Wallmann (1932–2013), politician (CDU), Mayor of Frankfurt from 1977 to 1986
- Klaus-Ernst Behne (1940–2013), professor of musicology
- Angelika Volquartz (born 1946), politician (CDU), 2003–2009 Mayor of Kiel
- Rebecca Harms (born 1956), politician (The Greens)
- Mola Adebisi (born 1973), TV presenter (VIVA)
- André Doehring (born 1973), musicologist
- Franz Eler (died 1590), choirmaster and composer

=== Sport ===
- Charlotte Mühe (1910–1981), a swimmer, bronze medallist at the 1928 Summer Olympics.
- Felipe Fernández Laser (born 1988), racing driver
- Sören Bertram (born 1991), footballer who has played over 280 games

== See also ==
- List of subcamps of Neuengamme.

== Notes ==
=== References ===
- Official German list of concentration camps Verzeichnis der Konzentrationslager und ihrer Außenkommandos (in German)
- Johann Parum Schultze; Reinhold Olesch (Hrsg.): Fontes linguae Dravaenopolabicae minores et Chronica Venedica J. P. Schultzii. (= Slavistische Forschungen; Band 7). Böhlau, Köln und Graz 1967
- Christian Hennig von Jessen: Vocabularium Venedicum (oder Wendisches Wörter-Buch) (1705). Nachdruck besorgt von Reinhold Olesch. - Köln [u.a.]: Böhlau 1959 (Gewährsmann des Pastors C. Hennig von Jessen war der polabisch sprechende Bauer Johann Janieschge aus Klennow)
