= Francis, Duke of Brunswick-Lüneburg =

16th Century Duke of Brunswick-Lüneburg

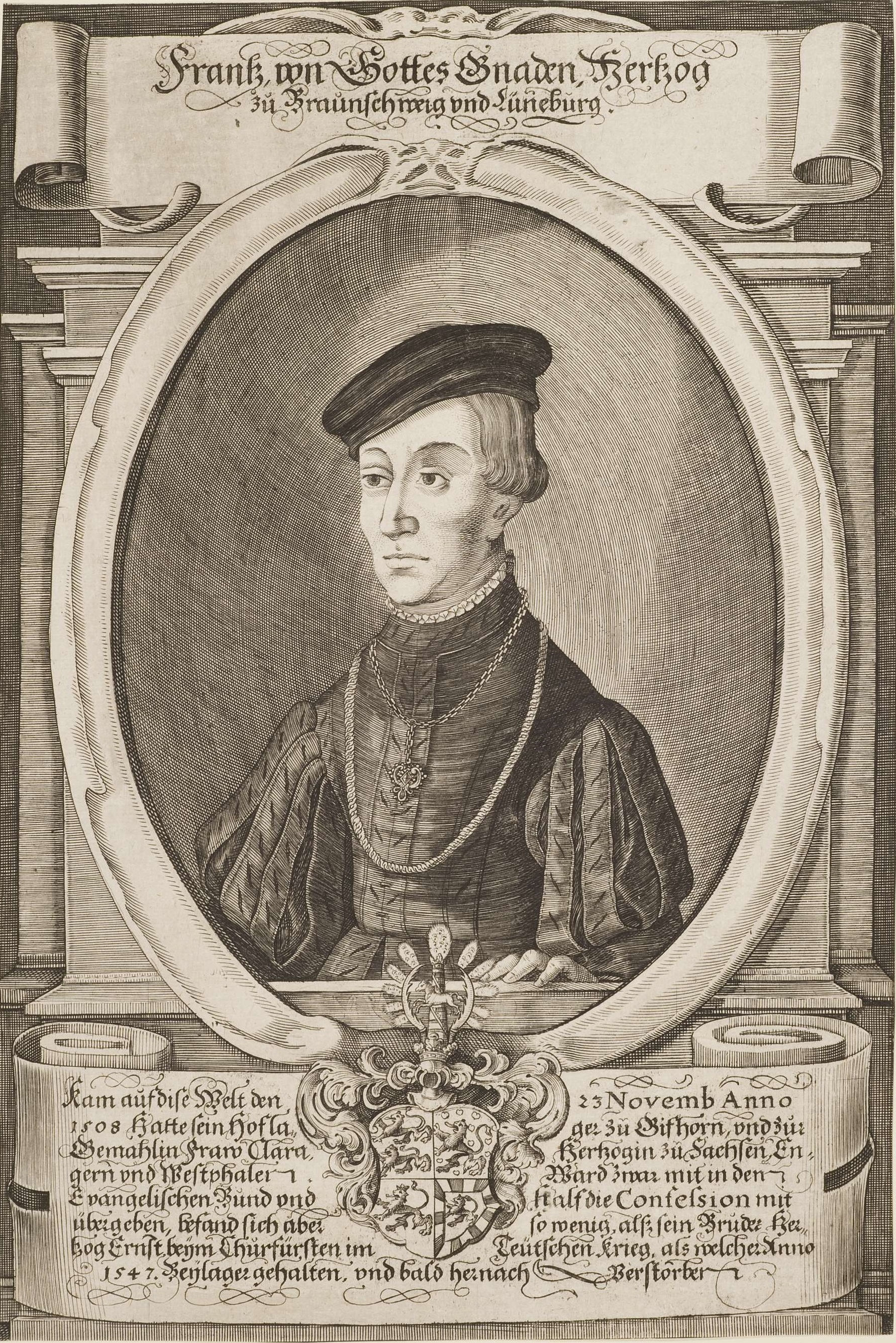
Duke Francis of Brunswick-Lüneburg

Francis of Brunswick-Lüneburg (23 November 1508 – 23 November 1549) was the youngest son of Henry the Middle. Following a thirty-year joint reign of Brunswick-Lüneburg with his brother Ernest the Confessor, he ruled the newly founded Duchy of Gifhorn from Gifhorn Castle for over 10 years from 1539 until his death in 1549. He was given the duchy as an inheritance settlement by his brother Ernest.

== Life ==
Francis was born on 23 November 1508 in Uelzen. His father, Henry the Middle (1468–1532), had planned that Francis would later become the Bishop of Hildesheim, but that proved impossible due to the worsened political situation.

After his father (who had supported a losing French contender for the imperial elections) was exiled to Paris in 1521, his two elder brothers, Otto and Ernest the Confessor, ruled the severely indebted Duchy of Celle.

They arranged for their brother, Francis, who was too young to share power, to have a professional education and, at the age of 16, sent him to the University of Wittenberg. When he came of age in 1526, he spent another ten years at the court of the Electorate of Saxony.

There he was impressed by the extravagant courtly life at the royal court with its feasting, hunting and travelling. Not until 1536 did he return to Celle at the prompting of his elder brother, Ernest, who had since espoused the Lutheran doctrine.

== Duchy of Gifhorn ==
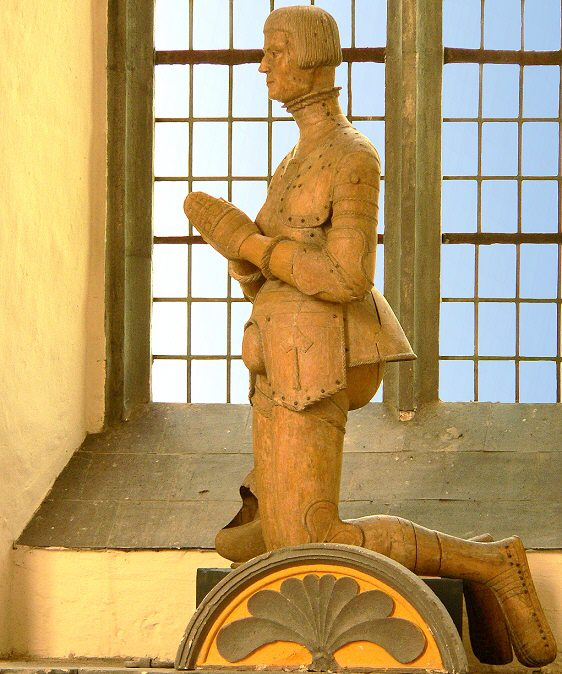
Life-size statue of the Protestant duke on entering the chapel at Gifhorn Castle

On his return, Francis showed no interest in the royal responsibilities expected of him. Moreover, the relatively modest standard of living in the little Residenz at Celle was not to his liking. By way of settlement he insisted on his own dukedom and pressed for a division of the territory.

His demand for the whole eastern half of the duchy was unacceptable, not least due to the serious debts owed by the state. As a result, in 1539 he was only given the Ämter of Gifhorn, Fallersleben and Isenhagen Abbey near Hankensbüttel.

These estates eventually made up the new Duchy of Gifhorn, a state of only of minor importance in the empire. It was a small, easily managed lordship, in which Duke Francis could indulge his noble image of himself and attended to his princely representational duties unfettered. He had Gifhorn Castle expanded as his Residenz and led an ostentatious, courtly life. At the same time he built Fallersleben Castle as a rural aristocratic estate.

== Reformation ==
Like his brother Ernest the Confessor, Duke Francis belonged to the alliance of Protestant princes, who petitioned the Imperial Diet in Speyer in 1529 at the so-called Protestation at Speyer. Both belonged to the Schmalkaldic League, which supported the ideas of Martin Luther.

In building the castle chapel at Gifhorn Francis created the first religious building in Northwest Germany, that was specifically for Protestant church services.

In 1546 Francis took part in the Schmalkaldic War; and in 1542, the Ottoman wars in Europe. In the area of Gifhorn he introduced the Reformation.

== Marriage ==
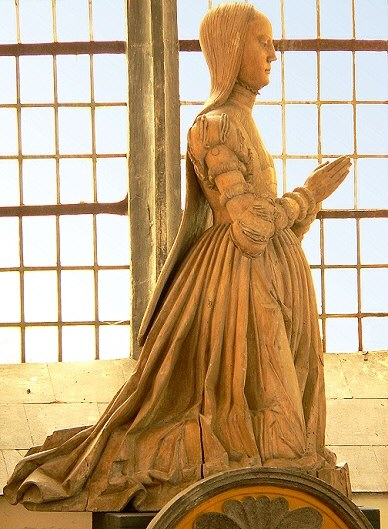
Statue of wife Clara in the castle chapel at Gifhorn

In 1547 Duke Francis married Clara of Saxe-Lauenburg, the daughter of Duke Magnus I of Saxe-Lauenburg in Ratzeburg.

The marriage lasted only three years before the duke died in great pain on 23 November 1549 on his 41st birthday. The cause was an infection of his foot that did not heal and even an amputation could not save his life.

He was interred in the chapel at Gifhorn Castle, where there is still a carved tomb figure on his sarcophagus. Because there were only 2 daughters from his marriage, the Duchy of Gifhorn returned to the family line in Celle. His wife, the Duchess Clara, was given Fallersleben Castle as her dowager home where she applied herself wholeheartedly to the common good of the place. She died in 1576 during a visit to Barth and was interred there.

=== Issue ===
- Catherine of Brunswick-Gifhorn (b 1548; d 10 December 1565) m Henry VI Burgrave of Meißen, (b 29 December 1536; d 22 January 1572)
- Clara of Brunswick-Gifhorn (b 1 January 1550; d 26 January 1598) m I: Bernhard VII, Prince of Anhalt-Dessau (1540–1570) m II: Bogislaw XIII, Duke of Pomerania (1544–1606)

== Ancestry ==
Ancestors of Francis, Duke of Brunswick-Lüneburg

8. Frederick II, Duke of Brunswick-Lüneburg
4. Otto V, Duke of Brunswick-Lüneburg
9. Magdalene of Brandenburg
2. Henry the Middle, Duke of Brunswick-Lüneburg
10. John IV, Count of Nassau-Dillenburg
5. Anne of Nassau-Siegen
11. Mary of Looz-Heinsberg
1. Francis, Duke of Brunswick-Lüneburg
12. Frederick II, Elector of Saxony
6. Ernest, Elector of Saxony
13. Margaret of Austria
3. Margaret of Saxony
14. Albert III, Duke of Bavaria-Munich
7. Elisabeth of Bavaria
15. Anna of Brunswick-Grubenhagen-Einbeck

== Honour ==
The town of Franzburg in the district of Vorpommern-Rügen was named in honour of him by his son-in-law, Duke Bogislaw XIII of Pomerania.

== Sources ==
- Brüggemann, Fritz (1973). Ein Herzog namens Franz. Das abenteuerliche Leben des Reichsfürsten Herzog Franz zu Braunschweig und Lüneburg, Herzog in Gifhorn. Ein Tatsachenbericht. Gifhorn 1973.

Francis, Duke of Brunswick-Lüneburg House of Welf Born: 23 November 1508 Died: 23 November 1549
German nobility
Preceded by Ernest I the Confessor	Duke of Brunswick-Lüneburg; Prince of Lüneburg; 1536–1539	Succeeded by Ernest I the Confessor
Preceded by ---	Duke of Brunswick-Lüneburg; Prince of Gifhorn; 1539–1549	Succeeded by ---
