= Theodore Kaufmann =

German-born American painter

- Born: December 18, 1814; Uelzen, Germany
- Died: 1896 (aged 81–82); New York City, New York, USA
- Known for: Military and historical paintings
- Military career
- Allegiance: Union Army
- Conflicts: American Civil War

Theodore Kaufmann (December 18, 1814 – 1896) was a German-born artist who worked mostly in the United States.

== Biography ==
Theodore Kaufmann was born in Uelzen, Germany. He served for several years as a mercantile apprentice and he studied painting in Düsseldorf with Peter von Cornelius, in Munich with Wilhelm von Kaulbach, and also in Hamburg and Dresden. He took part in the revolution at Dresden in 1848, and emigrated to the United States in 1850. He settled in New York City, where he painted portraits and taught. One of his students was editorial artist Thomas Nast. Kaufmann was not successful as a school director or painter in New York, and became an itinerant photographer and portrait painter.

During the American Civil War, Theodore Kaufmann is reported to have fought in the Union Army and to have been a correspondent-artist. St. Louis, Missouri city directories list him as an artist in 1864 and 1865. After the Civil War, he resided in Boston and Washington, D.C. Louis Prang made color lithographs of some of Kaufmann's more popular pieces. Kaufmann is noted for his portraits and military and historical paintings. He died in New York City.

== Works ==
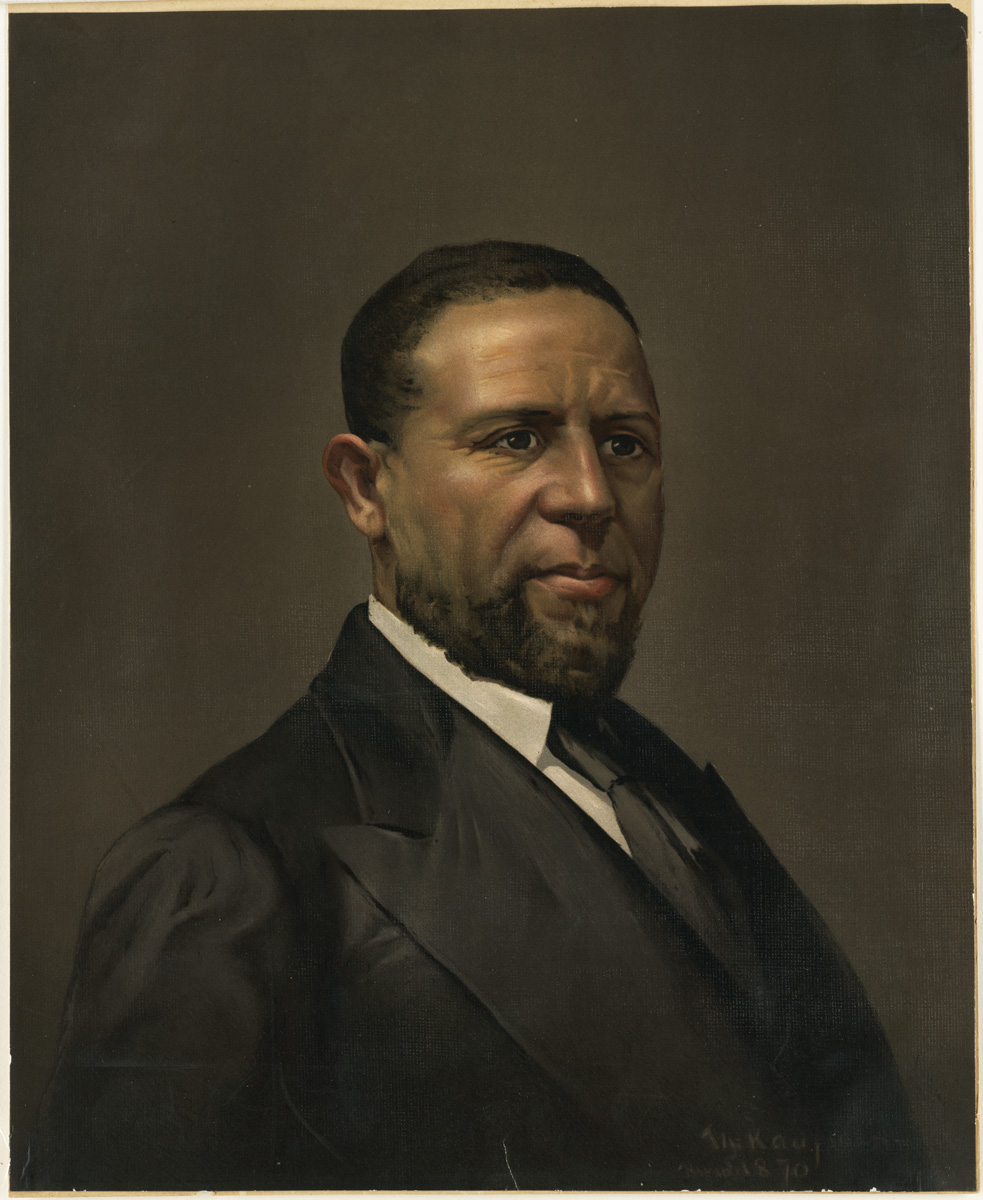
Portrait of United States Senator from Mississippi Hiram Revels by Theodor Kaufmann

- "Gen. Sherman near the Watchfire"
- "On to Liberty"
- "A Pacific Railway Train attacked by Indians"
- "Slaves seeking Shelter under the Flag of the Union"
- "Admiral Farragut entering Harbor through Torpedoes"
- "Farragut in the Rigging"
- "Effects of the Fugitive-Slave-Law"
- "Westward the Star of Empire" (c. 1880)
- "Die Entstehung der Gottesidee" ("The development of the idea of God"; a series of eight etchings which, along with explanatory text, are in the Library of Congress)
