= Fallersleben Castle =

Castle in Wolfsburg, Germany

Coordinates: 52°25′1.53″N 10°42′59.38″E

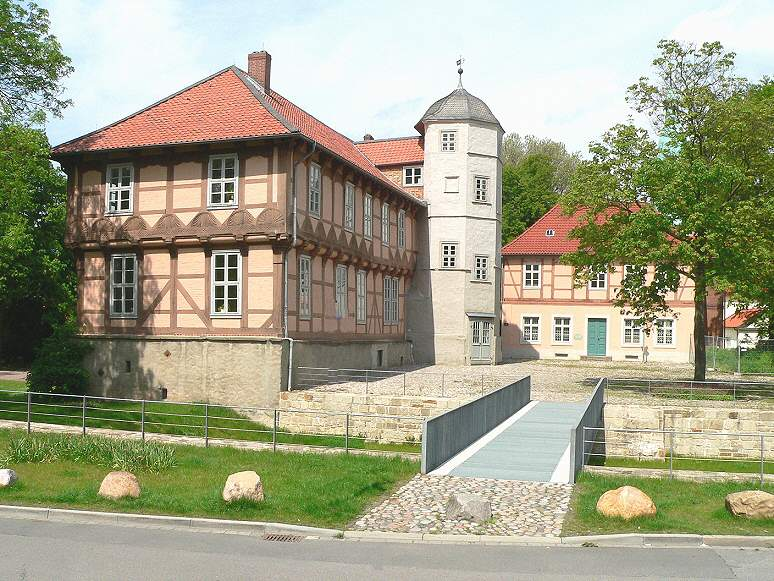
Inner courtyard of the water castle of Fallersleben and bridge over the reconstructed moat

Fallersleben Castle (German: Schloss Fallersleben) is located in Wolfsburg in the German state of Lower Saxony and, together with Neuhaus and Wolfsburg Castles, is one of the most important historic buildings in the town. It is in the district of Fallersleben and forms an historic setting along with the castle lake, St. Michael's Church and the Old Brewery.

== Construction ==
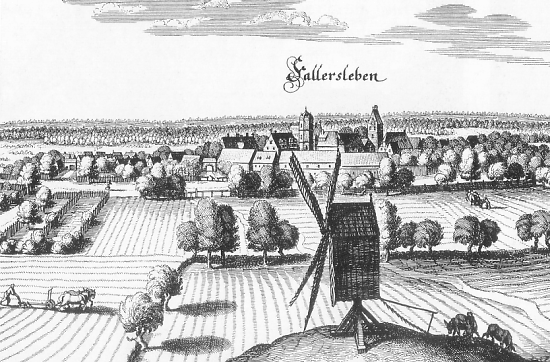
Merian copperplate of Fallersleben 1654 – left the castle tower, right the church tower

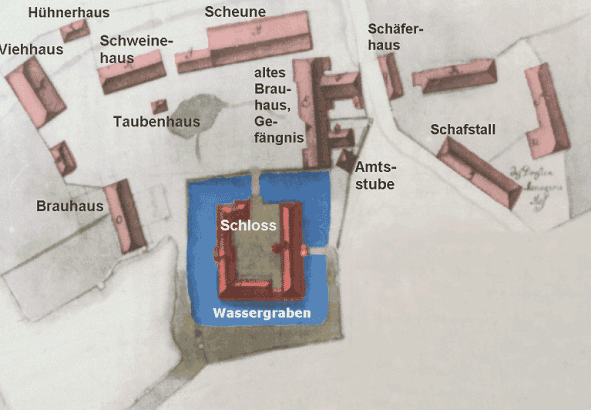
Plan of castle and outbuildings in 1765

The castle was built from 1520 to 1551, after its predecessor had been destroyed during the Hildesheim Diocesan Feud (1518–23). It was originally laid out as a horseshoe with the courtyard open on its south side. By 1760 the castle was surrounded by a moat, about 12 metres wide and 5 metres deep. Access was only possible over two bridges. One bridge and a section of moat was reconstructed in 1998 on the basis of archaeological excavations. Before that its water castle character was scarcely recognisable because the moats had been filled in. Of the original three wings of the castle, only the west wing, with its spiral staircase tower, in the inner courtyard has been preserved. It is a timber-framed building about 40 metres long on a stone foundation. There is also a royal court, the Kavaliershaus.

In the old castle buildings there were 16 living rooms (parlour (Hofestube), bed chamber (Schlafkammer), apartment (Gemach), young ladies room (Jungfrauen-Stube)) as well as the rooms for officials, kitchen staff (Wirtschaftspersonal), the armoury (Rüstkammer) and silver room (Silberkammer) of the ducal seat. Numerous outbuildings belonged to the castle, such as the Old Brewery, and extensive estates that were later converted into a ducal domain (Domäne). In 2001–03 Fallersleben Castle was renovated in line with its status as a listed building.

== History ==
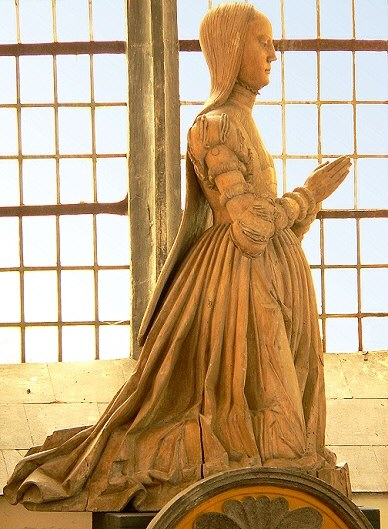
Mistress of the castle, Clara of Lauenburg

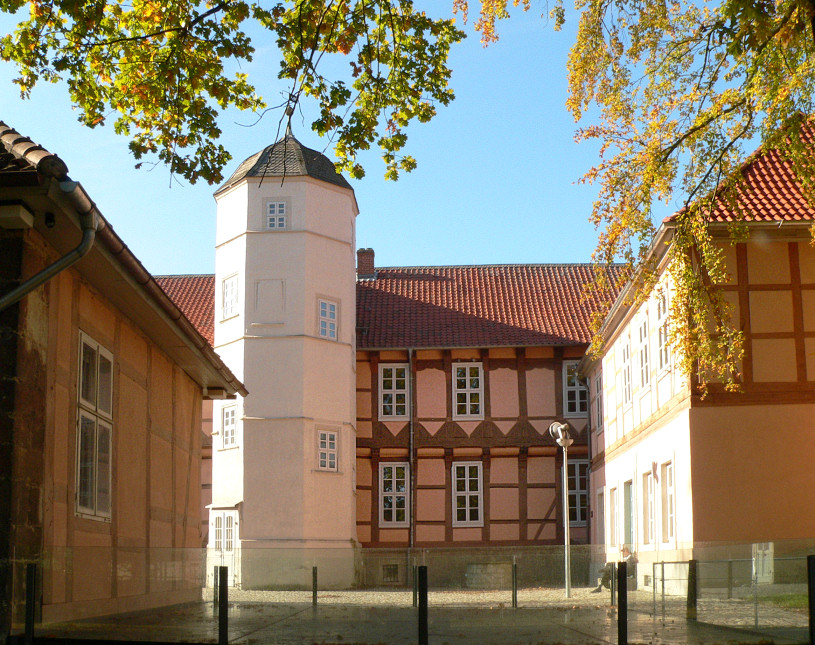
Courtyard

Fallersleben Castle, like Gifhorn Castle, was owned by Duke Francis of Brunswick and Lüneburg (1508–49). He died whilst it was being built, however, when he was 41 years old. From 1539 he ruled the Duchy of Gifhorn, in which Fallersleben lay, from his ducal seat in Gifhorn. Francis introduced the Reformation into the state. His wife was Clara of Saxe-Lauenburg, daughter of Duke Magnus I of Saxe-Lauenburg. After the death of her husband, Francis, she was given the castle as a dower and completed its construction in 1551. She lived for over 27 years in Fallersleben and generated a boom in the small town of Fallersleben (coinage (Münzordnung) was introduced in 1555, a market system (Marktordnung) in 1573, a brewery (Brauordnung) etc.). She died in 1576 during a visit to Barth, Germany and was buried there. After her death a Drost (manager) lived at the castle. Renovations were carried out in 1616 by Duke Christian, in 1636 by Duke Augustus and in 1649 by Duke Frederick. In the mid-17th century the ducal residence was given up and the main building of the castle became the seat of an Amt in which, from 1855, civic authorities were accommodated (finance office, court, town hall).

== Today ==
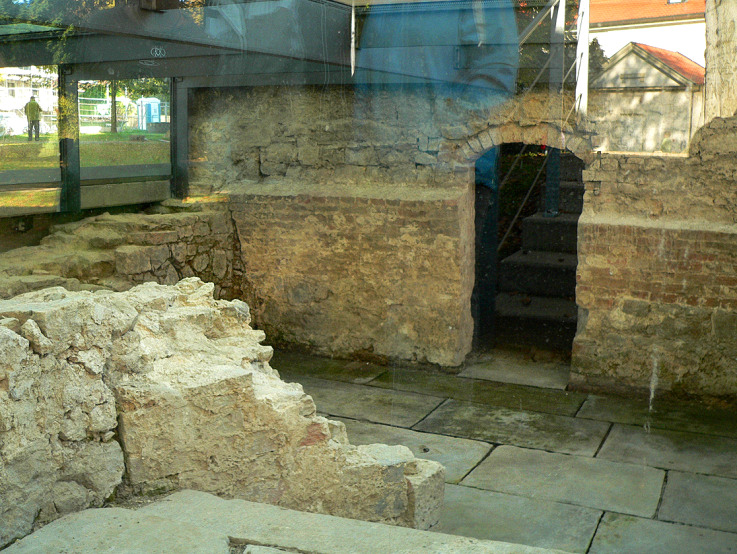
Excavated castle foundations and cellars protected by a glass cover

Since 1991 the basement of the castle has housed the Hoffmann von Fallersleben Museum, a museum about the history of German literature and democracy in the 19th century. It portrays the life of the poets of the Deutschlandlied and the history of its Kinderlieder. On the upper floor is an art gallery with paintings by Franz Hoffmann-Fallersleben (only child of Hoffmann von Fallersleben). Also worth seeing there are the wood carvings and stuccoed ceilings. The castle also has a suite of rooms that may be hired for events.

In 2001-03 archaeological investigations were carried out on the castle site. These exposed cellars with barrel ceilings (Tonnengewölbe) and walls 1.3 metres thick. Since the excavations the cellars and foundation walls have been covered with glass so that visitors can see them. Formerly the cellars under the castle were linked together and acted as store rooms for food.

== Sources ==
- Ernst Andreas Friedrich:Wenn Steine reden könnten. Bd 3. Landbuch-Verlag, Hannover 1995, ISBN 3-7842-0515-1
