= Clara of Saxe-Lauenburg =

Princess of Saxe-Lauenburg and Duchess of Brunswick-Gifhorn

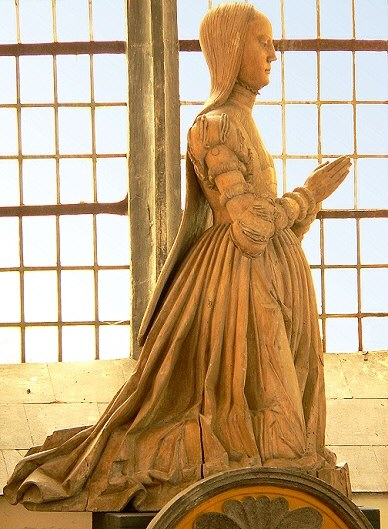
- Clara of Saxe-Lauenburg, wood sculpture in Gifhorn's palace chapel
- Born: 13 December 1518; Lauenburg
- Died: March 27, 1576 (aged 57); Barth
- Spouse: Francis, Duke of Brunswick-Lüneburg
- Father: Magnus I, Duke of Saxe-Lauenburg
- Mother: Catherine of Brunswick-Wolfenbüttel, Duchess of Saxe-Lauenburg

Clara of Saxe-Lauenburg (13 December 1518 – 27 March 1576) was a Princess of Saxe-Lauenburg and Duchess of Brunswick-Gifhorn by marriage.

== Life ==
Clara was born on 13 December 1518 in Lauenburg upon Elbe, a daughter of Duke Magnus I of Saxe-Lauenburg (1470–1543) and his wife Catherine (1488–1563), daughter of Duke Henry I of Brunswick-Wolfenbüttel.

She married Duke Francis of Brunswick-Gifhorn (1508–1549) on 29 September 1547 in the Saxe-Lauenburgian castle at Neuhaus in Darzing. The couple were greatly loved by their subjects even if their short marriage of convenience was unlucky. Clara, who was very benevolent and went into medicine, used to prepared an herbal beer (Kräuterbier) for the poor and sick, which was produced long after her death.

Following the death of her husband, Clara lived at the dower pledged to her as a life annuity in Fallersleben, where she finished building her castle in 1551 and presided over a boom in the local economy. Later she went to the court of her daughter in Barth, where she died on 27 March 1576. Clara was interred in St. Mary's Church there. Her tomb in the castle chapel in Gifhorn is empty.

== Descendants ==
Clara had two daughters from her marriage:

- Catherine (1548–1565)

∞ 1564 Burgrave Henry VI of Meißen (1536–1572)

- Clara (1550–1598)

∞ 1. 1565 Prince Bernhard VII of Anhalt (1540–1570)
∞ 2. 1572 Duke Bogislaw XIII of Pomerania (1544–1606)

== Ancestry ==
Ancestors of Clara of Saxe-Lauenburg

16. Eric IV, Duke of Saxe-Lauenburg
8. Bernard II, Duke of Saxe-Lauenburg
17. Sophie of Brunswick-Lüneburg
4. John V, Duke of Saxe-Lauenburg
18. Bogislaw VIII, Duke of Pomerania
9. Adelheid of Pomerania-Stolp
19. Sophia of Holstein
2. Magnus I, Duke of Saxe-Lauenburg
20. Frederick I, Elector of Brandenburg
10. Frederick II, Elector of Brandenburg
21. Elisabeth of Bavaria
5. Dorothea of Brandenburg
22. Frederick I, Elector of Saxony
11. Catherine of Saxony
23. Catherine of Brunswick-Lüneburg
1. Clara of Saxe-Lauenburg
24. William the Victorious, Duke of Brunswick-Lüneburg
12. William IV, Duke of Brunswick-Lüneburg
25. Cecilia of Brandenburg
6. Henry IV, Duke of Brunswick-Lüneburg
26. Bodo VII, Count of Stolberg-Wernigerode
13. Elisabeth of Stolberg-Wernigerode
27. Anna of Schwarzburg
3. Catherine of Brunswick-Wolfenbüttel
28. Wartislaw IX, Duke of Pomerania
14. Eric II, Duke of Pomerania
29. Sophie of Saxe-Lauenburg
7. Catherine of Pomerania-Wolgast
30. Bogislaw IX, Duke of Pomerania
15. Sophia of Pomerania-Stolp
31. Maria of Masovia

== Sources ==
- Johann H. Steffens: Johann Henry Steffens Auszug aus der Geschichte des Gesammthauses Brunswick-Lüneburg, Bartsch, 1785, S. 381
