= Franz Eler =

Teacher, choirmaster and composer of the Lutheran Reformation from Hamburg

Franz Eler (sometimes Elers) (died 1590) was a teacher, choirmaster and composer of the Lutheran Reformation from Hamburg. He was born in Uelzen. He became the cantor of Hamburg in 1529, and became the choirmaster of Hamburg Cathedral later. He is noted for assembling the large musical volume Gesangbuch in 1588, consisting of ritual Protestant music in Latin and Low German.
