= Gifhorn Castle =

Coordinates: 52°29′22.38″N 10°32′49.60″E

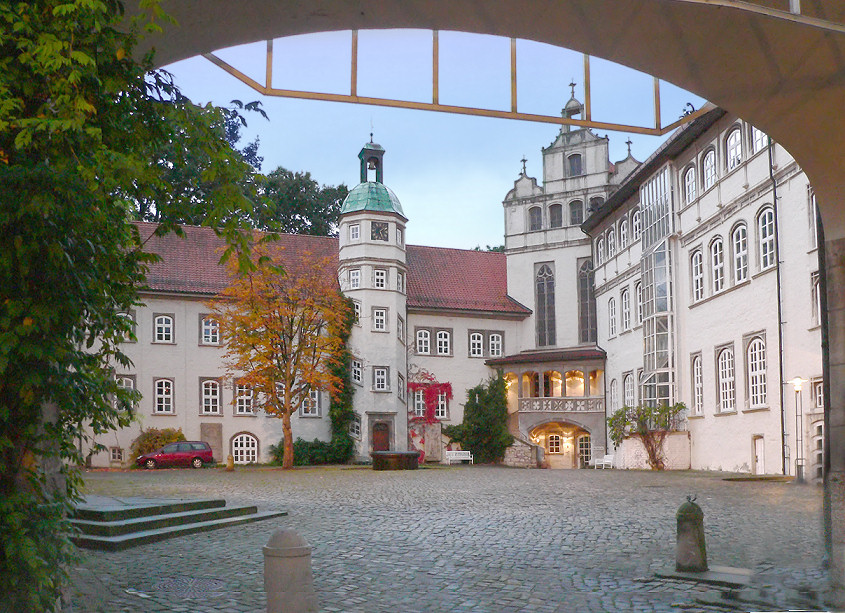
Castle courtyard. From left: the Kommandantenhaus with its staircase tower (Treppenturm), castle chapel (Schlosskapelle) and the Ablagerhaus

Gifhorn Castle (German: Schloss Gifhorn) is a castle in Gifhorn, Germany, built between 1525 and 1581 in the Weser Renaissance style. The castle was fortified until 1790 with moats, ramparts and bastions and was never captured. In the 16th century it was the Residenz of the Duchy of Gifhorn under Duke Francis of Brunswick-Lüneburg for just 10 years.

== Design ==
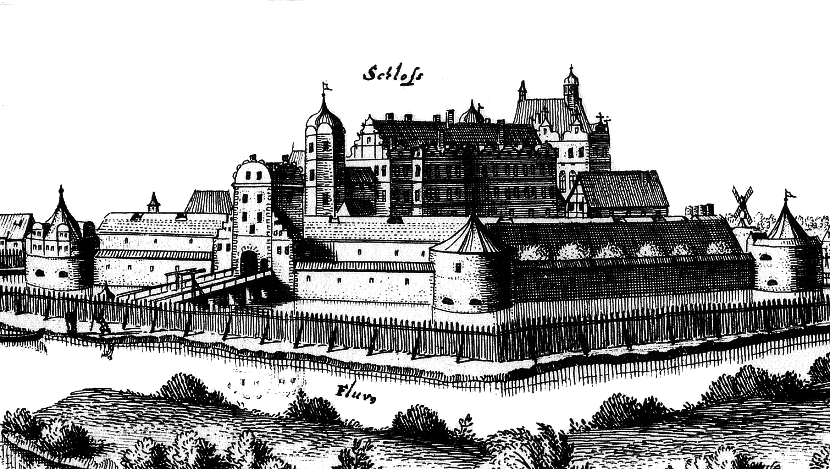
Merian copperplate of the fortified castle around 1654

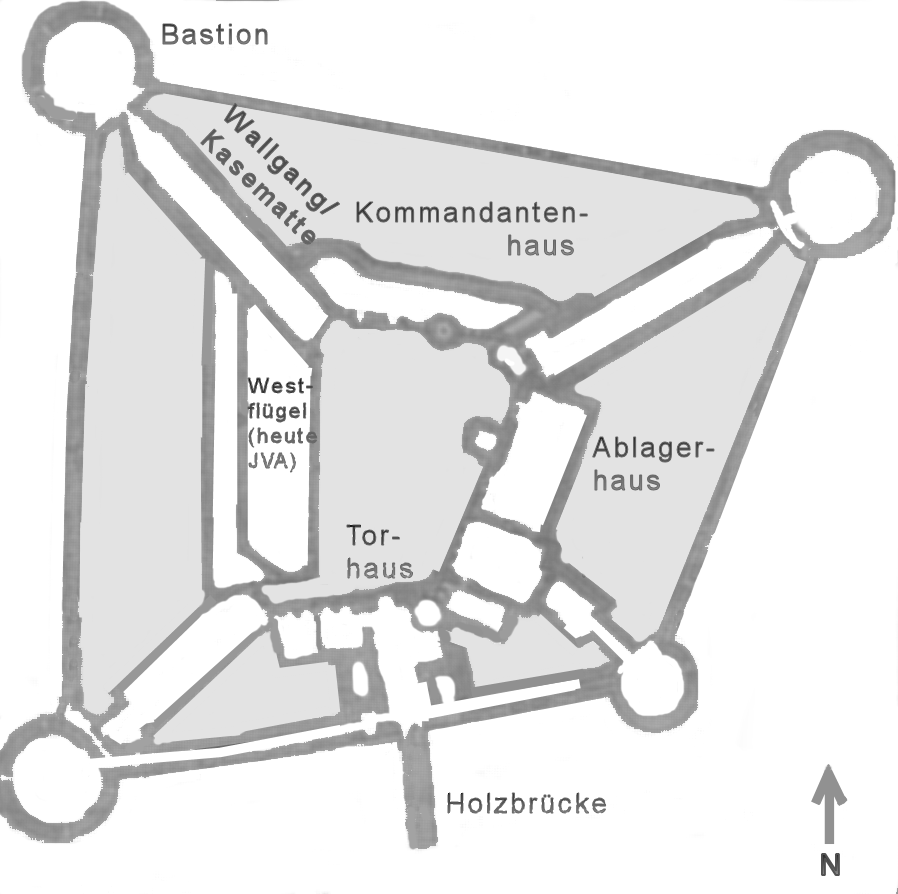
Plan of the castle in the 18th century

This well-fortified castle was built in the shape of a trapezium. It was surrounded by ramparts and a moat up to 50 metres wide. The immediate vicinity could be flooded to create a swamp. Stone bastion towers were built on the four corners of the site. These were linked to the castle by underground rampart passages (Wallgänge) in the form of casemates. A 45 metre long section is preserved today that led to the north bastion. Today it is used to house exhibitions for the castle museum. The original entrance to the castle was over a bridge on the narrow side of the castle moat in the southeast, that led to the gatehouse. Today the main entrance is through the old south bastion which has been reconstructed using sections of wall arranged in a circle. The following castle buildings are grouped around the inner courtyard:

- The gatehouse (Torhaus) is the oldest building and was completed in 1526, one year after work began on the castle. Due to its oversized dimensions it was probably originally planned as a single building. The roof, with its semi-circular gables is extraordinary and none like it has been preserved anywhere else. Until the 18th century the entrance to the castle was through the gatehouse; after that it was used as a grain store.
- The Ablagerhaus is the largest building in the east wing and acted from the 18th century as a residence for senior Gifhorn officials such as the Amtshauptmann. Its name, which means 'visit house', is derived from the fact that the occupants of its rooms had to vacate them when there was a lordly visit (Ablager) e.g. by royal hunting parties. This building contains the Great Hall (Rittersaal).
- The castle chapel (Schlosskapelle) was built in 1547 and was the first religious building built for Protestant services in Germany. It contains the sarcophagus of Duke Francis on a gallery (Empore) below a window and a life-size, kneeling statue of the duke. The sarcophagus of his wife, Clara of Lauenburg, is empty, because she died during a trip to her Pomeranian home in Barth. Nevertheless, there is also a statue of her.
- The Kommandantenhaus of 1581 was the residence of the Schlosshauptmann or Amtshauptmann. Later in the 19th and 20th century it became the seat of the county court (Amtsgericht)
- The staircase tower of 1568, with its spiral staircase, links the gatehouse tower with the Ablagerhaus
- The prison (Gefangenenhaus), armoury (Zeughaus) and grain store (Kornmagazin) in the west wing no longer exist. Instead, the prison complex (Justizvollzugsanstalt) was built here in the 19th and 20th centuries.

== History ==
=== Earlier castle ===
The fortified predecessor of the castle was a moated castle on a defended, artificial hill built in the angle between the rivers Aller and Ise. According to an investigation around 1900 by the pre-historian, Carl Schuchhardt, the old castle - of which nothing remains today - was built around 1000. It is mentioned for the first time in a deed of 1296 where it is called Castrum Gifhorne. It was besieged, probably during fighting between Duke Albert the Fat and his brother, Henry the Admirable. At the end of the 13th century renovation work was carried out on the castle under the direction of Otto the Strict. As the village of Gifhorn developed, the importance of the castle grew, both for security reasons and as a customs post on a trade route. In the 14th century it was frequently enfeoffed to, amongst others, the lord of Veltheim and the town of Brunswick. In 1396 Duke Frederick transferred the castle to his wife Anna of Saxony as a life annuity. In the 15th century other tenants followed, like the von Bülows (1467), von Alvenslebens (1470), von Quitzows (1472) and von Bodendiekes (1477). During the Hildesheim Diocesan Feud the castle and town were destroyed in 1519. Both belonged at the time to the Duchy of Brunswick-Wolfenbüttel.

=== Construction ===
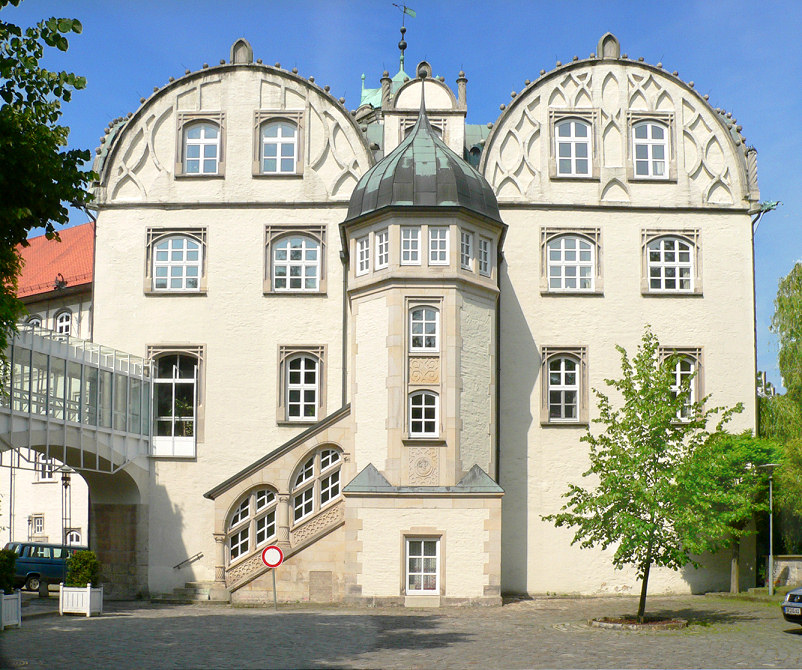
The gatehouse, the first castle building to be completed (in 1526)

The present structure was built from 1525 as a completely new castle, not on the site of its predecessor, but on a hill on what was then the northern edge of the town of Gifhorn. It was commissioned by the Protestant dukes, Ernest the Confessor of Brunswick-Lüneburg and his brother Otto of Celle. Ernest gave the castle as a wedding present to his wife, Sophie of Mecklenburg-Schwerin, on the occasion of their marriage in 1528. It was given to her as an annuity, under which she could use the building and its revenue. In 1539 Duke Ernest gave the castle and its surrounding Ämter to his youngest brother Duke Francis, who had returned from the court of the Elector of Saxony and was demanding his share of the inheritance.

=== Castle history ===
On taking over the castle in 1539, Duke Francis was able to indulge his noble image of himself and attended to his princely representational duties unfettered. He had Gifhorn Castle expanded as his Residenz and led an ostentatious, courtly life. At the same time he built Fallersleben Castle as a rural aristocratic estate. Life with his more prudent brother, Ernest and the relatively modest standard of living in the small Celle Residenz was not enough for him. Francis engaged the fortress architect, Michael Clare, from Celle. His works dominate the appearance of Gifhorn Castle.

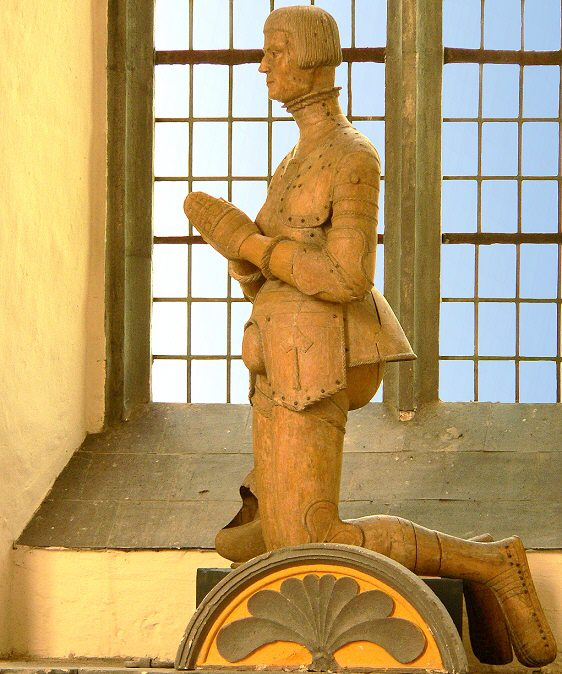
Duke Francis in the castle chapel

After the death of Duke Francis in 1549 the castle ceased to be a princely Residenz. The Duchy of Gifhorn that had lasted just 10 years from 1539 to 1549 was re-absorbed into the main ducal house in Celle. The widowed duchess, Clara, had to move out of the castle rooms and take up her dowager residence at Fallersleben Castle. Thereafter Gifhorn Castle became the residence of a bailiff (Amtmann). Occasionally it was used as accommodation for the royal hunting parties of the Celle dukes, who came here in order to hunt in the great forests around Gifhorn.

Nevertheless the castle was retained as a fortress, because it had a strategically important function for the Celle dukes on the southeastern flank of their dukedom. The castle was run by a castellan (Schlosshauptmann) and, from 1734, a seneschal (Landdrost). He was the fortress commander (Festungskommandant) and, from the 16th century onwards, commanded a force of armourers (Waffenmeister), Büchsenschützen and Landsknechten. From the time it was built the fortress withstood every attack. Enemy troops, like the Swedes, Danes, league (Ligisten) and imperial troops in the Thirty Years War and French armies in the Seven Years' War quartered themselves in the town of Gifhorn but avoided attacking the castle.

The last Schlosshauptmann, Ulrich von Veltheim allowed the fortifications to be dismantled between 1770 and 1780, because it was no longer equal to technological advances of that time. The moats were reduced to half-width and entrances were constructed at the northern and southern bastions. The fortified gatehouse was converted into a grain store. From the 18th century, district administrators (Landräte) officiated in the castle. A fundamental renovation and redevelopment of the whole castle area took place between 1978 and 1983. Today the castle is home to the following:

- Gifhorn district with the district council rooms
- Great Hall Event Venue (Veranstaltungsort Rittersaal)
- Gifhorn Castle History Museum with 1000 m² of exhibition area showing the development of Gifhorn from ancient times to the present
- The castle restaurant
- The prison (Justizvollzugsanstalt)

== Sources ==
- Jürgen Conrad (Text): Schloß Gifhorn. Landkreis Gifhorn, Gifhorn 1983.
- Ernest Andreas Friedrich: Wenn Steine reden könnten. Bd 3. Landbuch-Verlag, Hannover 1995, ISBN 3-7842-0515-1
- Hans Adolf Schultz: Burgen und Schlösser des Brunswicker Landes. Waisenhaus, Brunswick 1980, 1984 (4.Aufl.). ISBN 3-87884-012-8
