= Isenhagen Abbey =

Coordinates: 52°43′31.9″N 10°37′8.9″E

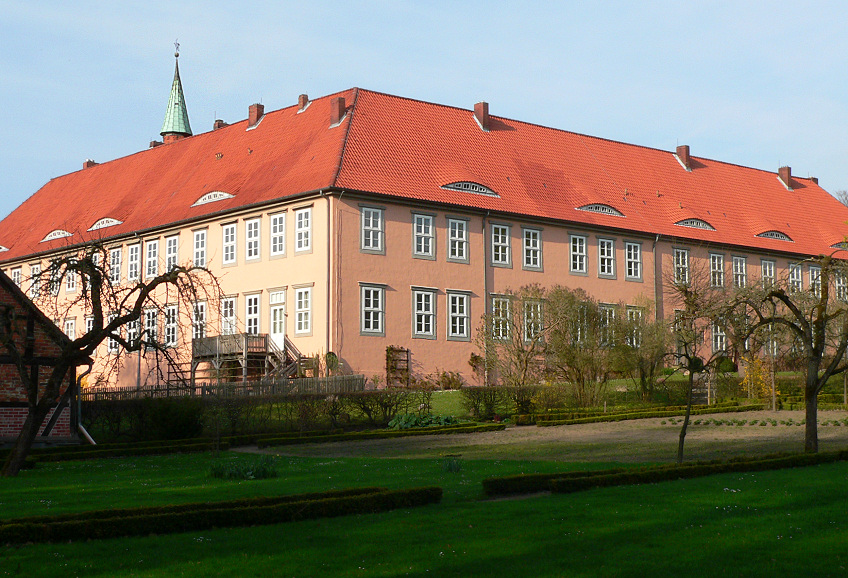
Side facing the road with the monastery garden

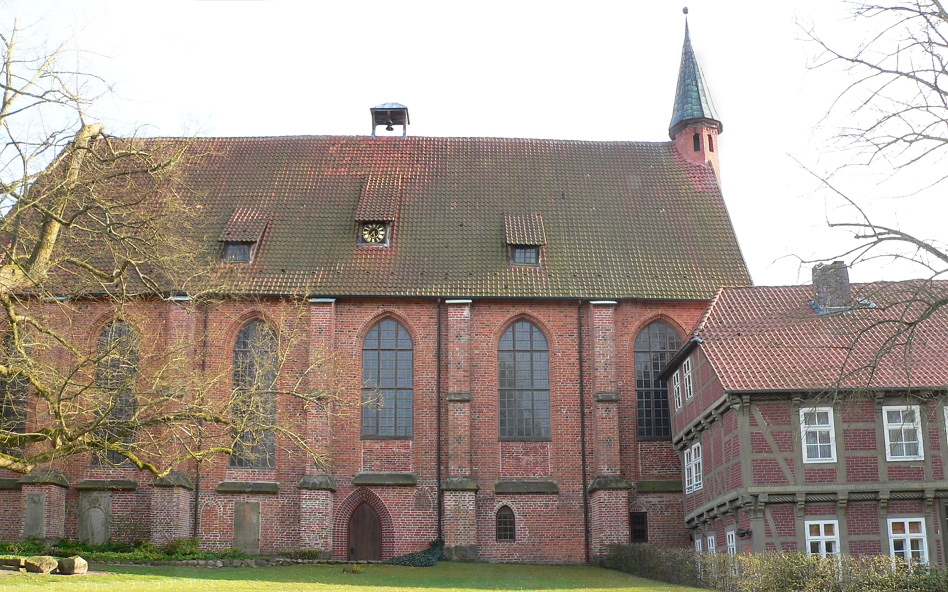
Convent chapel

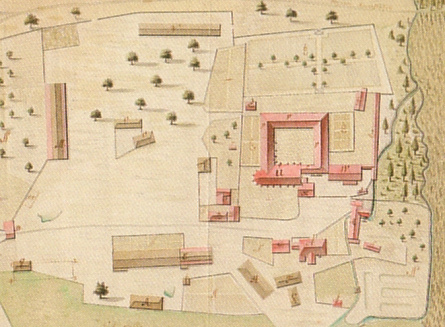
1742 site plan

Isenhagen Abbey (German: Kloster Isenhagen) is an Evangelical Lutheran convent in Hankensbüttel in the district of Gifhorn in the German state of Lower Saxony. It was a nunnery founded by the Cistercian order, now serving as a Lutheran women's convent. It is managed by the monastic chamber in Hanover.

== Origins ==
The name of the abbey, Isenhagen, is probably derived from its original site next to the River Ise and an area of woodland. It was founded in 1243 as a friary for Cistercians in the present-day locality of Alt-Isenhagen within the town of Hankensbüttel. After being in existence for just 16 years it was burnt down and, in 1262, rebuilt as a nunnery. In 1329 it was moved to Hankensbüttel where it is to this day.

== Description ==
Since the Reformation the site has been a convent for Lutheran conventuals. In its Brick Gothic buildings it houses a rich treasure of medieval furniture and high quality works of art: carved and painted altars, sculptures, small paintings for private devotions and embroidered altar cloths and antependia, some of which are adorned with golden reliefs and pearls.

== Literature ==
- Horst Appuhn: Bilder aus Kloster Isenhagen, Königstein i. Ts. 1989 (= Die Blauen Bücher), ISBN 3-7845-0480-9
