= Residenz =

Residenz (German: [ʁeziˈdɛnts]) is a German word for 'domicile', now obsolete except in the formal sense of an official residence. A related term, Residenzstadt, denotes a city where a sovereign ruler resided, and thus carries a similar meaning to the contemporary expressions seat of government or capital. As there were many sovereign (imperially immediate) rulers in the Holy Roman Empire, ranking from lord (Herr) to prince elector and king, there are many cities, palaces, and castles in the empire's former territory which used to be a Residenz, some of which are still so referred to today. The former status of a city as a Residenz is frequently reflected in the architecture of its center. During the baroque period especially, many prestigious buildings were erected; sometimes even new towns were founded. Most former Residenzstädte still serve as cultural and administrative centers today.

Examples of buildings or cities:

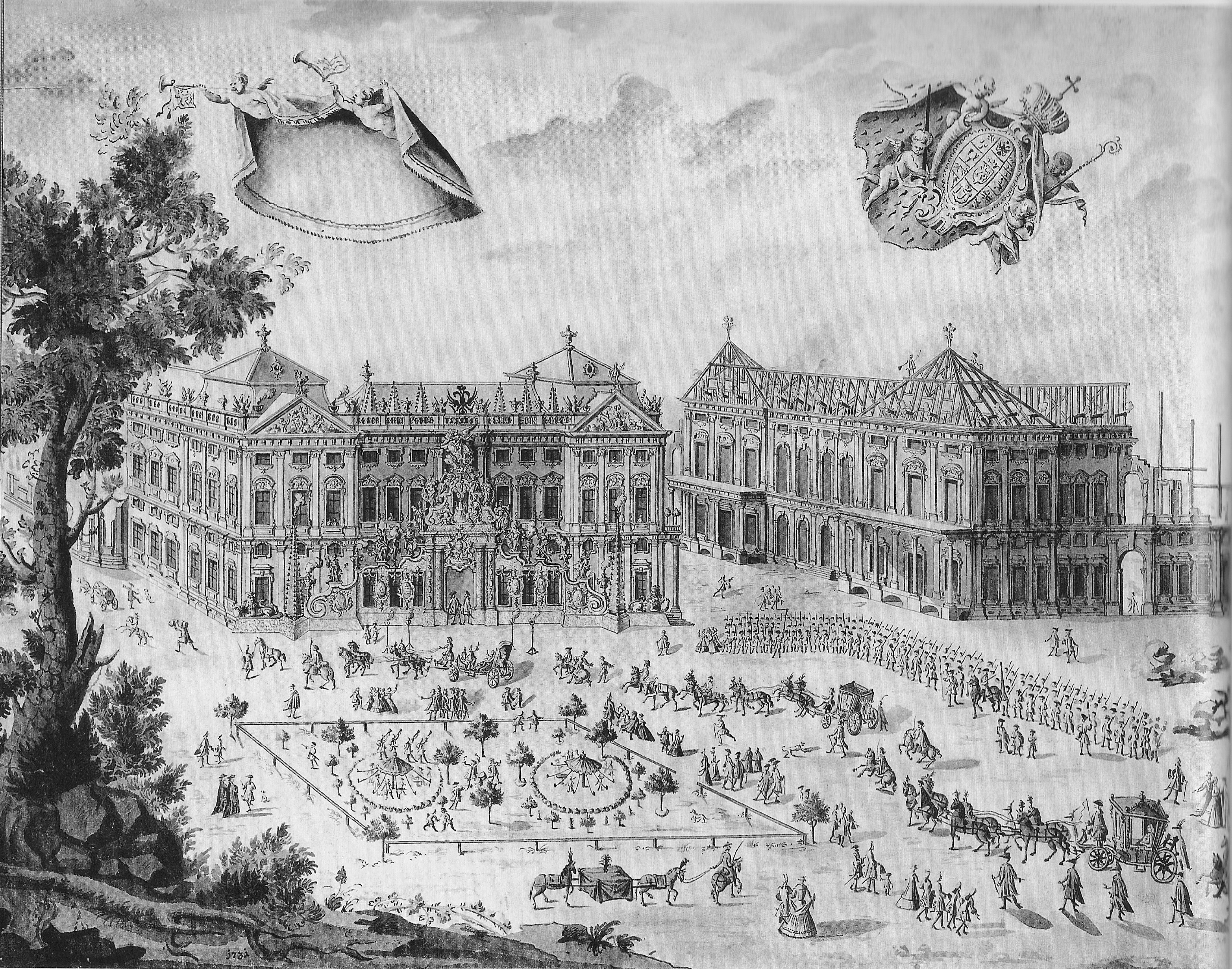
The Würzburg Residenz under construction in 1731

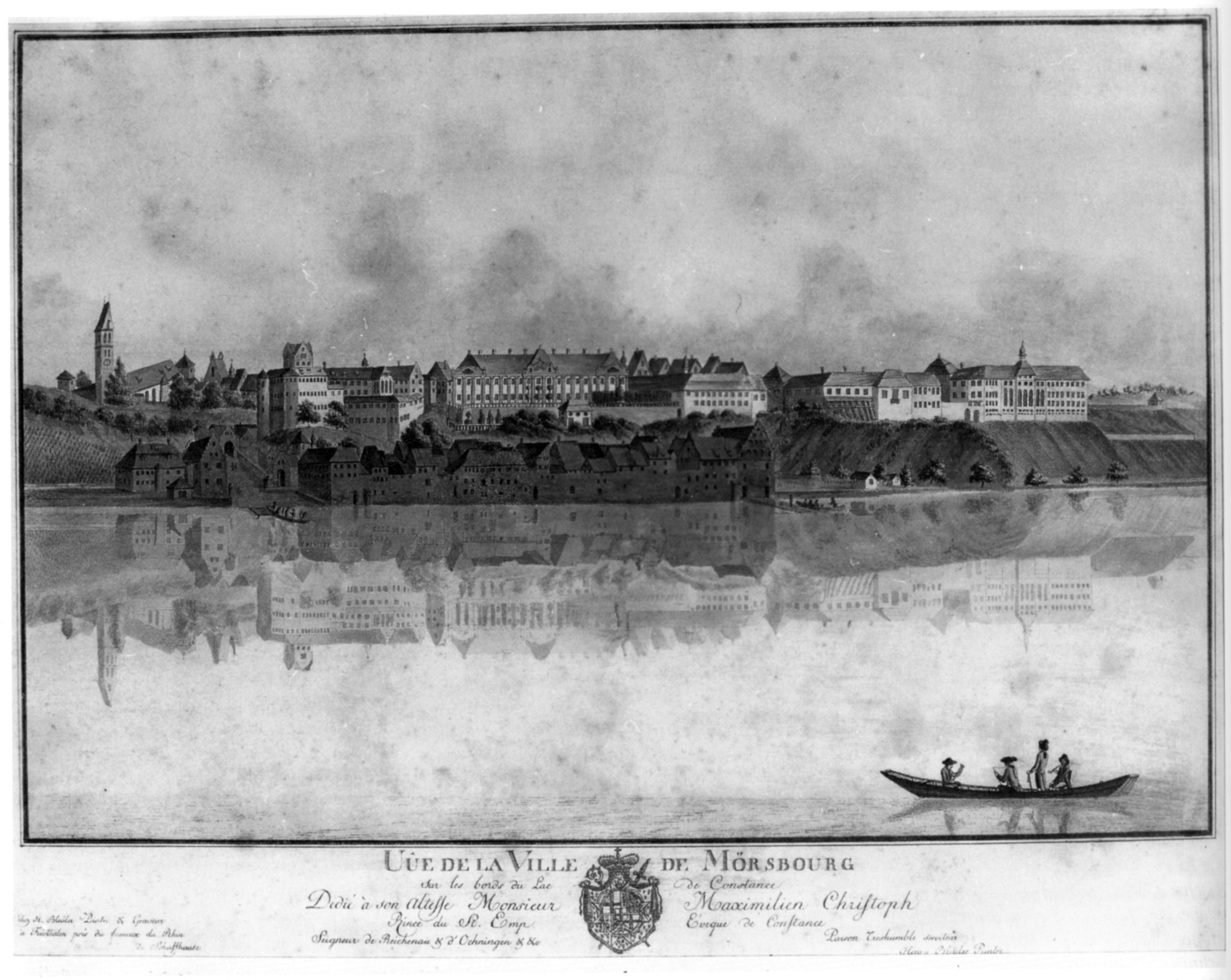
Meersburg, the seat of the prince-bishops of Constance

- Munich Residenz, the former residence of the Dukes and Kings of Bavaria. Munich remains the capital of the German state of Bavaria.
- Würzburg Residenz, the former residence of the prince-bishops of Würzburg. Würzburg today is capital of the Lower Franconia government district of Bavaria.
- Alte Residenz, the former residence of the archbishops of Salzburg. Salzburg today is the capital of the state of Salzburg in Austria.
- Prussia's Residenzstädte, where the royal family maintained residences, were Berlin, Königsberg, Potsdam, and Breslau.

Rulers who founded Residenz towns in the baroque era:

- Louis William, Margrave of Baden, general field marshal of the Holy Roman Empire, nicknamed Türkenlouis for his successes against the Turks and now in possession of a great war prize, in 1699 altered plans for a hunting lodge being built near the village of Rastatt since 1697. Aiming to become prince elector, he spent 12 million guilders on Rastatt Castle. The village grew accordingly and was incorporated as a town in 1700. Louis William lived at the castle from 1702, and the court followed from Baden-Baden in 1705.
- Eberhard Louis, Duke of Württemberg, had begun reconstruction of a destroyed hunting lodge north of his capital of Stuttgart in 1704. In 1705, he named the site Ludwigsburg. Plans were enlarged in 1706 and again in 1715, resulting in Ludwigsburg Palace. In 1709, Eberhard Louis moved to the new castle. Beginning in the same year, a planned community was constructed near the palace, which was incorporated as a town in 1718. Ludwigsburg became the official seat of the dukes of Württemberg in 1718. After Eberhard Louis's death in 1733, his successor took the court back to Stuttgart. From 1764 to 1775, Charles Eugene, quarrelling with the duchy's estates over yet another residence, the New Palace in Stuttgart, moved his official residence to Ludwigsburg once more.
- In 1715, Margrave Charles III William of Baden-Durlach chose to build a new residence in a forest clearing that he called Karlsruhe ('Charles's rest'). Karlsruhe became his primary residence and by 1719 the administration of his domain had been completely transferred from Durlach. From 1806, Karlsruhe was the capital of the Grand Duchy of Baden. After 1952, when the states of Baden and Württemberg were merged into Baden-Württemberg and the Württemberg capital Stuttgart became the capital of the new state, Karlsruhe not only remained the capital of a government district of the same name, but was made Residenz des Rechts (the seat of law) for all of West Germany. Today it is the seat of the German Federal Constitutional Court and Federal Court of Justice.
- Charles III Philip, Elector Palatine since 1716, transferred his seat in 1720 from Heidelberg to Mannheim, a fort at the confluence of the rivers Rhine and Neckar, which had been destroyed in the war and was being rebuilt. The construction of Mannheim Palace began in 1720 on the site of the former citadel.
