= List of Christian monasteries in Saxony =

This is an incomplete list of Christian religious houses in Saxony in Germany, extant and non-extant, and including houses of both men and women. Most religious houses in Saxony were suppressed during the Reformation in the 16th century, but some survived. A small number also survived the Communist period of the DDR, including the Cistercian nunnery of St. Marienthal Abbey in Ostritz founded in 1243. Since the reunification of Germany in 1990, a number of new religious communities have been established.

== List ==
=== A ===
- Adorf: Teutonic Knights
- Altzella Abbey (Kloster Altzella), Nossen: Cistercian monks (1170–1540)
- Annaberg Friary (Franziskanerkloster Annaberg), Annaberg-Buchholz: Franciscan friars (1502–39)

=== B ===
- Bautzen:
  - Franciscan friary, Grosse Brüdergasse
  - St. Peter's collegiate foundation, Bautzen (Stift St. Petri)
- Buch Abbey (Kloster Buch), Klosterbuch in Leisnig: Cistercian monks (shortly before 1192–1525)

=== C ===
- Chemnitz:
  - Schlossberg: Benedictines
  - Franciscan friary, Chemnitz

=== D ===
- Döbeln Abbey (Kloster Döbeln), Döbeln: Benedictines
- Dommitzsch Commandery, Dommitzsch: Teutonic Knights
- Dörschnitz Abbey (Kloster Dörschnitz or Kloster Marienpforte), Dörschnitz: Benedictines
- Dresden:
  - Sophienkirche, previously the Franziskanerkloster, Dresden
  - Augustinian priory, Dresden
  - Franciscan friary, Dresden

=== E ===
- Antonine Hospital, Eicha

=== F ===
- Frankenhausen Abbey, Frankenhausen in Crimmitschau: Cistercian nuns
- Freiberg:
  - Dominican priory, Freiberg
  - Franciscan friary, Freiberg
  - Magdalenes' priory, Freiberg
  - St. Mary's collegiate foundation, Freiberg (St. Marienstift)

=== G ===
- St. Mary's Abbey, Geringswalde (Kloster St Marien, Geringswalde), Geringswalde: Benedictines
- Franciscan friary, Goerlitz (Klosterplatz)
- Grimma:
  - Grimma Priory: Augustinian canons
  - Grimma Abbey: Cistercians
  - see also Nimbschen
- Grossenhain:
  - Magdalenes' priory, Grossenhain
  - Servite priory, Grossenhain
  - collegiate foundation, Frohngässchen
- Grünhain Abbey (Kloster Grünhain): Cistercian monks (1230–1536)
- Güldenstern, see Marienstern

=== K ===
- St. Anne's Priory, Kamenz: Franciscans
- Kitzen Abbey, Kitzen: Cistercians
- Königstein: Celestines

=== L ===
- Leipzig:
  - Franciscan friary of the Holy Spirit, Leipzig (dates tbe)
  - St. George's Abbey, Leipzig (Kloster St. Georg, Leipzig): Cistercian nuns (before 1230–1541)
  - St. Paul's Priory, Leipzig: Dominicans (dates tbe)
  - St. Thomas' Abbey, Leipzig (Kloster St. Thomas, Leipzig): Augustinian Canons (1212–1541)
  - St. Albert's Priory, Wahren (Dominikanerkloster St. Albert, Wahren) (Wahren, Leipzig): Dominicans (from 1929)
- St. John's church collegiate foundation, Löbau (Stift Johanniskirche, Löbau), Löbau: collegiate foundation

=== M ===
- Marienpforte, see Dörschnitz and Sitzenroda
- St. Marienstern Abbey (Kloster St. Marienstern), Panschwitz-Kuckau: Cistercian nuns (from 1248)
- Marienthal, see also St. Marienthal and Somzig
- Marienthron, see Nimbschen
- Martinstal Priory (Kloster Martinstal), later Martinstal Charterhouse (Kartause Martinstal), Crimmitschau, Neukirchen: Augustinian Canons (1228–1478), Carthusian (1478–1526)
- Meissen:
  - Abbey of the Holy Cross, Meissen (Kloster Heilig Kreuz, Meissen): Benedictine nuns (late 12th century - 1568)
  - Gymnasium Franziskaneum Meissen<!-–?= Sts Peter & Paul Friary––>
  - collegiate foundation, now the Evangelische Trinitätskirche
  - St. Afra's Priory, Meissen: Augustinian canons
  - Meissen Cathedral chapter
- Mühlberg, see Marienstern
- Mutzschen - Servites

=== N ===
- Nimbschen Abbey (Kloster Nimbschen, Kloster Marienthron), near Grimma: Cistercian nuns (1243–1536/42)

=== O ===
- Franciscan friary, Oschatz
- Ostritz, see St. Marienthal
- Oybin Abbey (Kloster Oybin) on Mount Oybin (Berg Oybin): Celestines (1369 – mid–16th century)

=== P ===
- Pegau Abbey (Kloster Pegau or Kloster St Jakob, Pegau), Pegau: Benedictines
- St. Henry's Priory, Pirna: Dominicans
- Plauen:
  - Teutonic Knights
  - Dominican priory, Plauen

=== R ===
- Radeburg:
  - Servite priory, Radeburg
  - Augustinian priory, Radeburg
- Reichenbach Commandery, Reichenbach: Teutonic Knights
- Remse Abbey, Remse: Benedictines
- Riesa Abbey (Kloster Riesa), Riesa: Benedictines

=== S ===
- St. Marienthal Abbey (Kloster St. Marienthal), Ostritz, Oberlausitz: Cistercian nuns (from 1234– )
- Seusslitz Priory or St. Afra's Priory, Seusslitz (Kloster St. Afra, Seusslitz), Seusslitz in Nünchritz: Poor Clares (1268–1541)
- Sitzenroda Abbey or Marienpforte Abbey, Sitzenroda (Kloster Sitzenroda, Kloster Marienpforte), Sitzenroda: Benedictines
- Somzig Abbey or Marienthal Abbey (Kloster Somzig or Kloster Marienthal), Somzig: Benedictines
- Staucha Abbey (Kloster Staucha), Staucha: Benedictines

=== T ===
- Torgau:
  - Franciscan friary, Torgau
  - Torgau Abbey: Cistercian monks

=== W ===
- Wechselburg Priory, formerly Wechselburg Abbey (Kloster Wechselburg): Benedictine monks (Benedictine monks (1168–1278); Teutonic Knights (1278–1570); refounded 1993 as a priory of Ettal Abbey)
- Franciscan friary, Weinhübel (Zittauer Strasse)
- Wurzen Abbey (Stift Wurzen), Wurzen: collegiate foundation

=== Z ===
- Zelle Priory (Klösterlein Zelle), Aue (Sachsen): Augustinian Canons (1173–1524/25)
- Franciscan friary, Zittau
- Zwickau:
  - Cistercian abbey, Zwickau
  - Benedictine abbey, Zwickau
  - Franciscan friary, Zwickau

== See also ==
- List of Christian monasteries in Brandenburg
- List of Christian monasteries in Mecklenburg-Vorpommern
- List of Christian monasteries in North Rhine-Westphalia
- List of Christian monasteries in Saxony-Anhalt
- List of Christian monasteries in Schleswig-Holstein

== Sources ==
- Dresden-und-Sachsen.de (in German)
- Meinestadt.de:Sachsen (in German)
- HTW-Dresden.de: Klöster (with map) (in German)
