= List of Christian monasteries in Saxony-Anhalt =

This is a list of Christian monasteries, both men's and women's, in Saxony-Anhalt, Germany. Some were dissolved during the Reformation in the mid-16th century, but a number survived as Catholic institutions until the secularisation of the Napoleonic period, while others became Lutheran and continued either as schools or as establishments for the unmarried daughters and widows of the aristocracy (Damenstifte). The Communist period after World War II saw little activity in terms of religious houses, for obvious reasons: a conspicuous exception was the re-foundation of Huysburg Priory in 1972. A small number of religious communities, both Catholic and Lutheran, have opened after reunification. Extant religious houses are shown in bold.

== A ==
- Abbenrode Priory (Kloster Abbenrode), Abbenrode: Augustinian Canons (before 1141–1554)
- Adersleben Abbey (Kloster Adersleben), Wegeleben: Cistercian nuns (1267–1809)
- Althaldensleben Abbey (Kloster Althaldensleben), Haldensleben: Cistercian nuns (1228–1810)

== B ==
- Badersleben Priory (Kloster Badersleben), Badersleben, Huy: Augustinian canonesses (or nuns) (dates tbe)
- Berge Abbey (Kloster Berge, otherwise known as Kloster St. Johannes der Täufer auf dem Berge), near Buckau, Magdeburg: Benedictine monks (c 966 – 1810)

== C ==
- Gottesgnaden Abbey or God's Grace Abbey, Calbe (Stift Gottes Gnade, Calbe), Gottesgnaden, Calbe: Premonstratensians (1131-late 16th century)

== D ==
- Dambeck Abbey (Kloster Dambeck), Dambeck, Salzwedel: Benedictine nuns c 1200–1542; refounded 1644 as a school; run since 1993 by a Lutheran religious community, the Brotherhood of Joseph (Joseph-Bruderschaft)
- Drübeck Abbey (Kloster Drübeck), Drübeck: Benedictine nuns (before 960 – mid-17th century); Lutheran women's collegiate foundation (Damenstift) (1732–1946)

== E ==
- Egeln, see Marienstuhl

== F ==
- Francisceum, see Zerbst

== G ==
- Gernrode Abbey (Stift Gernrode), Gernrode: secular canonesses (960–1570)
- Gottes Gnade, see Calbe
- Gröningen Priory (Kloster Gröningen), Gröningen: Benedictine monks (936–1550)
- Gross Ammensleben Abbey (Kloster Gross Ammensleben) Gross Ammensleben, Niedere Börde: proprietary monastery (nk-1129); Benedictine monks (1129–1804)

== H ==
- Hadmersleben Abbey (Kloster Hadmersleben), Hadmersleben: Benedictine nuns (961–1809)
- Halberstadt:
  - St. Andrew's Priory (Kloster Sankt Andreas, Halberstadt): Franciscan friary (nk-1803)
  - St. Burchard's Abbey (Kloster Sankt Burchardi, Halberstadt): Premonstratensians (1186-nk); Knights Templar (nk-1206); Cistercian nuns (1206–1808)
  - St. Catharine's Priory (Kloster Sankt Katharina, Halberstadt): Dominican friars (nk-1803)
  - St. John's Priory (Kloster Sankt Johann, Halberstadt): Augustinian canons (nk-1803)
  - St. Nicholas' Priory (Kloster Sankt Nikolaus, Halberstadt): Dominican nuns (nk-1803)
  - St. Thomas's at the Broad Gate (St. Thomae am Breiten Tor): commandery of the Knights Templar (1206-nk)
  - St. Ursula's Priory (Kloster Sankt Ursula, Halberstadt): Cellitines (nk-1803)
- Hamersleben Priory (Kloster Hamersleben): Augustinian Canons (1111–1804; founded 1108 in Osterwieck and moved to Hamersleben; a double monastery until the end of the 13th century)
- Havelberg Abbey (Kloster Havelberg), Havelberg: Premonstratensians (1150–1506)
- Hedersleben Abbey or Priory (Kloster St. Gertrudis, Hedersleben), Hedersleben: Cistercian nuns (nk-1811)
- **Helfta Priory**, formerly Helfta Abbey (Kloster St. Marien zu Helfta, otherwise Kloster Helfta), Helfta and Eisleben: Benedictine and also later Cistercian nuns (1258–1542; moved to Helfta from Mansfeld in 1258, from Helfta to Eisleben 1343, from Eisleben back to Helfta in 1525); re-founded in Eisleben as a Cistercian nunnery, Kloster St. Marien zu Helfta, in 1999
- Hillersleben Abbey (Kloster Hillersleben), Hillersleben: Benedictine nuns (2nd half 10th century-c 1000); Benedictine monks (1022–1632)
- Himmelpforten Priory (Kloster Himmelpforten), between Hasserode in Wernigerode and Darlingerode: Augustinian Hermits (1253-early 18th century?)
- **Huysburg Priory**, formerly Huysburg Abbey (Kloster Huysburg; Priorat Huysburg), Huysburg: Benedictine monks (1080–1804); re-founded 1972

== I ==
- Ilsenburg Abbey (Kloster Ilsenburg), Ilsenburg: Benedictine monks (1003x1009-1555)

== J ==
- Jerichow Monastery ( Kloster Jerichow ), Jerichow: Premonstratensians (1144–16th century)

== K ==
- Klosterrode Abbey (Kloster Roda or Rode; also Kloster Klosterrode), Klosterrode, Blankenheim: Premonstratensians (c 1147–1543)
- Cölbigk Abbey (Kloster Cölbigk), Cölbigk (or Kölbigk), Ilberstedt: Premonstratensians (1140–1540)
- Konradsburg: Benedictine monks (1120s–1477); Carthusians (1477–1525)

== L ==
- Leitzkau Abbey or Priory (Kloster Leitzkau), Leitzkau, Gommern: Premonstratensians (1138/39-c1535)
- Hospital of St. Anthony, Lichtenburg (Haus Lichtenbergk), near Prettin: Antonine Brothers (before 1315–1525; rebuilt as a palace, Schloss Lichtenburg, later in the 16th century)

== M ==
- Magdeburg:
  - Abbey of Our Lady, Magdeburg (Kloster Unser Lieben Frauen, Magdeburg [1]): collegiate foundation of canons (1015x1018-1129); Premonstratensians (1129–1601; motherhouse of the Premonstratensian Order during that period); school 1698-1832x1834
  - **Priory of Our Lady, Magdeburg** (Kloster Unser Lieben Frauen, Magdeburg [2]): a priory of Hamborn Abbey, opened since 1990; has no connection with the previous Abbey of Our Lady
  - St. Agnes' Abbey or Priory, Neustadt (Agnetenkloster, Neustadt), Alte Neustadt: Cistercian nuns (1230–1810)
  - St. Mary Magdalene's Abbey, Magdeburg (Kloster Mariae Magdalenae, Magdeburg): Augustinian nuns (c 1230-shortly after 1524)
  - St. Maurice's Abbey, Magdeburg (Mauritiuskloster or Moritzkloster, Magdeburg): Benedictine monks (937-not later than 963)
  - St. Peter and Paul's Abbey (Kloster Sankt Peter und Paul, Magdeburg), Alte Neustadt: collegiate foundation (1200-in or before 1631)
  - Franciscan friary, Magdeburg (1230–1542)
- Mansfeld:
  - Mansfeld Abbey (Kloster Mansfeld): Benedictine nuns (1229–1258; moved to Helfta)
  - Hospital of St. John, Mansfeld (Johanniterhaus Mansfeld): Knights Hospitallers (dates tbe)
- Marienstuhl Abbey (Kloster Marienstuhl), Egeln: Cistercian nuns (1259–1809)
- Memleben Abbey (Kloster Memleben), Memleben: Benedictine monks (975–1548)
- Michaelstein Abbey (Kloster Michaelstein), near Blankenburg: Cistercian monks (1139–1543; moved here from the Volkmarskeller); Lutheran community and school (1543–1808)

== N ==
- Neuendorf Abbey (Kloster Neuendorf), Kloster Neuendorf near Salzwedel: Cistercian nuns (before 1232–1578); Lutheran women's collegiate foundation (Damenstift) (1578-nk)
- Nienburg Abbey (Kloster Nienburg), Nienburg: Benedictine monks (975–1563; moved here from Thankmarsfelde)

== O ==
- Osterwieck, see Hamersleben

== P ==
- **Petersberg Abbey** (Kloster Petersberg) near Halle: Augustinian Canons (1124x1142-1565); recently re-occupied by a Lutheran community
- **Pforta Abbey** (Kloster Pforta), Pforta near Naumburg: Cistercian monks (1137–1540; moved here from Schmölln); school from 1540 onwards (**Landesschule Pforta**)
- Plötzky Abbey or Priory (Kloster Plötzky), Plötzky: Cistercian nuns (early 13th century-1538)
- Posa Abbey (Kloster Posa), Zeitz: Benedictine monks (1114-nk)
- Prettin, see Lichtenburg

== Q ==
- Quedlinburg:
  - Quedlinburg Abbey (Stift Quedlinburg), Quedlinburg: secular canonesses (936–1540); Lutheran women's collegiate foundation (1540–1803)
  - St. Wipert's Priory, Quedlinburg (Stift St. Wiperti, Quedlinburg): canons (963–1148); Premonstratensians (1148–1539)

== R ==
- Roda or Rode, see Klosterrode
- Rohrbach Abbey or Priory (Kloster Rohrbach), Oberröblingen, Sangerhausen: Cistercian nuns (13th century-1554)

== S ==
- Schmölln Abbey (Kloster Schmölln), Schmölln: Benedictine monks (before 1066-c 1127); Cistercian monks (1127-1137x1140; moved to Pforta)
- **Sittichenbach Abbey** (Kloster Sittichenbach), Sittichenbach, Osterhausen: Cistercian monks (1141–1540); site returned to the Cistercians 1990, in use as a retreat centre

== T ==
- Thankmarsfelde Abbey (Kloster Thankmarsfelde) near Ballenstedt: Benedictine monks (970–975; moved to Nienburg)

== V ==
- Volkmarskeller, near Blankenburg: a cave with a church, used by hermits from no later than the 9th century; Cistercian monks (1146-1151x1167; moved to Michaelstein)

== W ==
- Walbeck Priory (Stift Walbeck), Walbeck: canons (942–1591?)
- Waldhusen Abbey (Kloster Waldhusen), Thale: secular canonesses (c 840–1540)

== Z ==
- St. John's Friary, Zerbst: Franciscans (before 1246–1532; continued to the present as a school, the **Francisceum**, also known as the Johannesschule)
- Zscheiplitz Abbey or Priory (Kloster Zscheiplitz), Zscheiplitz, Freyburg: Benedictine nuns (1089-nk: in private hands by 1723)

== See also ==
- List of Christian monasteries in Brandenburg
- List of Christian monasteries in Mecklenburg-Vorpommern
- List of Christian monasteries in North Rhine-Westphalia
- List of Christian monasteries in Saxony
- List of Christian monasteries in Schleswig-Holstein

== External links / Sources ==
- Strasse der Romanik (in German)
- Sachsen-Anhalt-ABC.de (in German)
- Stiftung Dome und Schlösser in Sachsen-Anhalt (in German)
- Diocese of Magdeburg: history (in German)
