= List of Christian monasteries in Schleswig-Holstein =

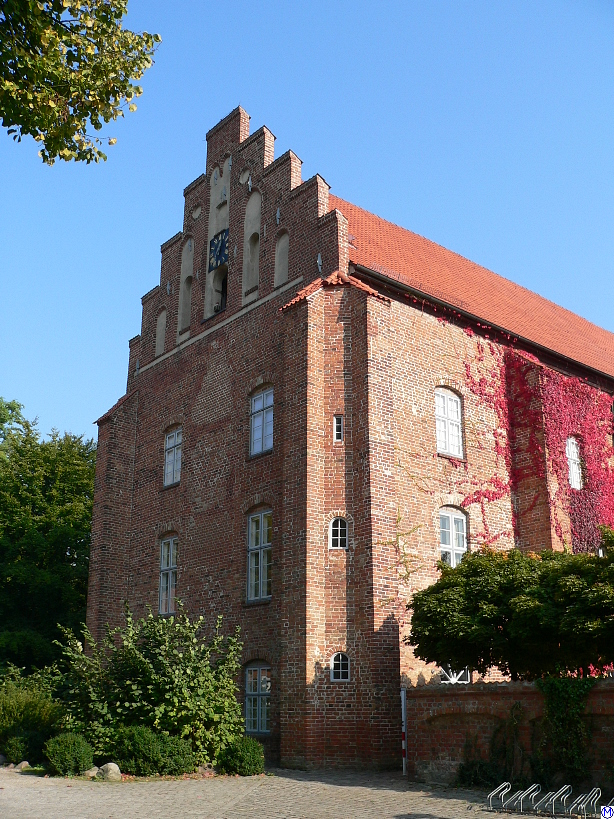
Cismar Abbey

This is a list of Christian religious houses in Schleswig-Holstein in Germany, including Hamburg and Lübeck, extant and non-extant, and including houses of both men and women. All religious houses were suppressed during the Protestant Reformation in the 16th century, with the exception of four former nunneries (Itzehoe, Preetz, Uetersen and St. John's, Schleswig), which became Protestant collegiate foundations for noblewomen, and still survive today.

Religious house	Location	Dedication	Order	Notes
Ahrensbök Charterhouse	Ahrensbök	Blessed Virgin Mary	Carthusians	1397-1542
Béguinages	Hamburg, Lübeck, Neumünster, Neustadt and Plön		Beguines	various
Bordesholm Priory or Provostry	Bordesholm	Blessed Virgin Mary	Augustinian Canons	c.1326/30-1566; moved here from Neumünster
Cathedral chapters	see Lübeck, Ratzeburg and Schleswig			
Cismar Abbey	near Grömitz	Blessed Virgin Mary and Saint John the Evangelist	Benedictine monks	1231-1561; transferred from St. John's Abbey, Lübeck
Flensburg Friary	Flensburg	Saint Catherine	Franciscan friars	1232/33 or 1263–1528
Magdalenenhof (extant)	Flensburg		Dienerinnen vom Heiligen Blut (Ancillae Sanctissimi Sanguinis)	established after 2009
Guldholm Abbey	Glücksburg		Benedictine monks	1191/92-1209/10; transferred from St Michael's Abbey, Schleswig; transferred to Rüde Abbey
St. Mary Magdalene's Priory, Hamburg	Hamburg	Saint Mary Magdalene	Franciscan friars	1236/39-1529
St. John's Priory, Hamburg	Hamburg	Saint John	Dominican friars	c.1236-1529
Harvestehude Priory	Harvestehude	Blessed Virgin Mary	Cistercian nuns until the Reformation; afterwards, Lutheran women's collegiate foundation (Damenstift)	c.1250-1529 (Cistercian nuns); 1529-nk [after 1837] (Damenstift)
Hemmingstedt Priory	Hemmingstedt	Blessed Virgin Mary	Benedictine nuns; Franciscan friars	1503-17 (Benedictine nuns); 1517-18 (Franciscan friars)
Franciscan Friary, Husum	Husum		Franciscan friars	c.1494-after 1527
Dominican Priory, Husum	Husum		Dominican friars	shortly before 1466-tbe
Itzehoe Abbey (extant)	Itzehoe	Blessed Virgin Mary	?order; survived Reformation as a Lutheran women's collegiate foundation (Damenstift)	founded in Ivenfleth in 1230, moved to Itzehoe 1256; 1256–1538, nuns; 1541 to present, Damenstift
Kiel Friary	Kiel	Blessed Virgin Mary	Franciscan friars	c.1240-1530
Haus Damiano (extant)	Kiel		Franziskanerinnen zu Münster St. Mauritz	established 2003; previously in Projensdorf 1994, then in Haus Michael until 2003
Kuddewörde Friary	Kuddewörde		Wilhelmite friars	1495/97-c.1525
St. John's Abbey, Lübeck	Lübeck	Saint John the Evangelist	Benedictine double monastery, later Benedictine nuns; Cistercian nuns; women's collegiate foundation	1177-1231: Benedictine double monastery, later Benedictine nuns; transferred to Cismar; 1246-1575: Cistercian nuns; 1575-1806: women's collegiate foundation
St. Catherine's Priory, Lübeck	Lübeck	Saint Catherine	Franciscan friars	1225-1531
St. Mary Magdalene's Priory, Lübeck (or Burgkloster)	Lübeck	Saint Mary Magdalene	Dominican friars	1227/29-1532
St. Anne's Priory, Lübeck	Lübeck	Saint Anne	Augustinian nuns	1502/05-1532
St. Michael's Priory, Lübeck	Lübeck	Saint Michael	Sisters of the Common Life	before 1451–1557
Lunden Friary	Lunden		Franciscan friars	1516-32
Marienwohlde Abbey	near Mölln		Bridgettine double monastery	1413-1558
Meldorf Priory	Meldorf	Blessed Virgin Mary	Dominican friars	1378-1540
Mohrkirchen Hospital or Preceptory	Mohrkirch	Saint Anthony	Hospital Brothers of St. Anthony	1391-1535 at Mohrkirch (Danish: Mårkær
Neumünster Priory	Neumünster	Blessed Virgin Mary	Augustinian Canons	c.1125/27-c.1330 (transferred to Bordesholm)
Priory of the Sisters of the Common Life, Neumünster	Neumünster		Sisters of the Common Life	1498-1570
Neustadt Priory	Neustadt	Saint Anne	Sisters of the Common Life	c.1245/50-1537
Nütschau Priory, or St. Ansgar's Priory (extant)	Travenbrück	Saint Ansgar	Benedictine monks	founded 1951 as a dependent house of Gerleve Abbey; independent priory from 1975
Plön Priory	Plön	Blessed Virgin Mary and the Ten Thousand Martyrs	Sisters of the Common Life	1468-1578
Preetz Priory (extant)	Preetz	Blessed Virgin Mary and Saint John	Benedictine nuns; Lutheran women's collegiate foundation (Damenstift)	c.1210/12-1542: Benedictine nuns; 1542 to the present: Damenstift
St. George's Abbey on the Hill, Ratzeburg (Kloster St. Georg auf dem Berge)	Ratzeburg	Saint George	Benedictine monks; became a hospital in the 13th century	early 11th century-1066; c. 1145-Reformation
Abbey of St. Mary and St. John, Ratzeburg	Ratzeburg	Blessed Virgin Mary and Saint John the Evangelist	Premonstratensian Canons; secular canons	Ratzeburg Cathedral chapter - 1154-1504: Premonstratensian Canons; 1504-1566: secular canons
Reinbek Abbey	Reinbek	Saint Mary Magdalene	Cistercian nuns	1226/29-1529
Stift St Adolf (extant)	Reinbek		Sisters of Saint Elizabeth	established 1883
Reinfeld Abbey	Reinfeld	Blessed Virgin Mary	Cistercian monks	1186/90-1582
Rüde Abbey	Glücksburg		Cistercian monks	1209/10-after 1557 (demolished 1582); transferred from Guldholm Abbey
St. John's Priory, Schleswig (extant) (Schleswig St. Johannis)	Schleswig	Saint John the Baptist; later also Saint John the Evangelist	Benedictine nuns; Lutheran women's collegiate foundation (Damenstift)	1st half of the 13th century-1542: Benedictine nuns; 1542 to the present: Damenstift
St. Michael's Abbey, Schleswig (Schleswig St. Michaelis)	Schleswig	Saint Michael	Benedictine monks	before 1140–1192
St. Paul's Priory, Schleswig (Schleswig St. Paul, also known as the Graukloster or "Greyfriars")	Schleswig	Saint Paul	Franciscan friars	1234-1528/29
St. Mary Magdalene's Priory, Schleswig (Schleswig St. Maria Magdalena)	Schleswig	Saint Mary Magdalene	Dominican friars	1235-1528/29
Segeberg Priory or Provostry	Bad Segeberg	Blessed Virgin Mary and Saint John the Evangelist	Augustinian Canons	1134 (re-settled in 1155)-1564/66
Konvent List	Sylt	Steyler Missionary Sisters	Augustinian Canons	2008–2019
Uetersen Priory (extant)	Uetersen	Blessed Virgin Mary, Saint John the Apostle, Saint Bartholomew and the Holy Cross	Cistercian nuns; Lutheran women's collegiate foundation (Damenstift)	1234/35-1555: Cistercian nuns; 1555 to the present: Damenstift

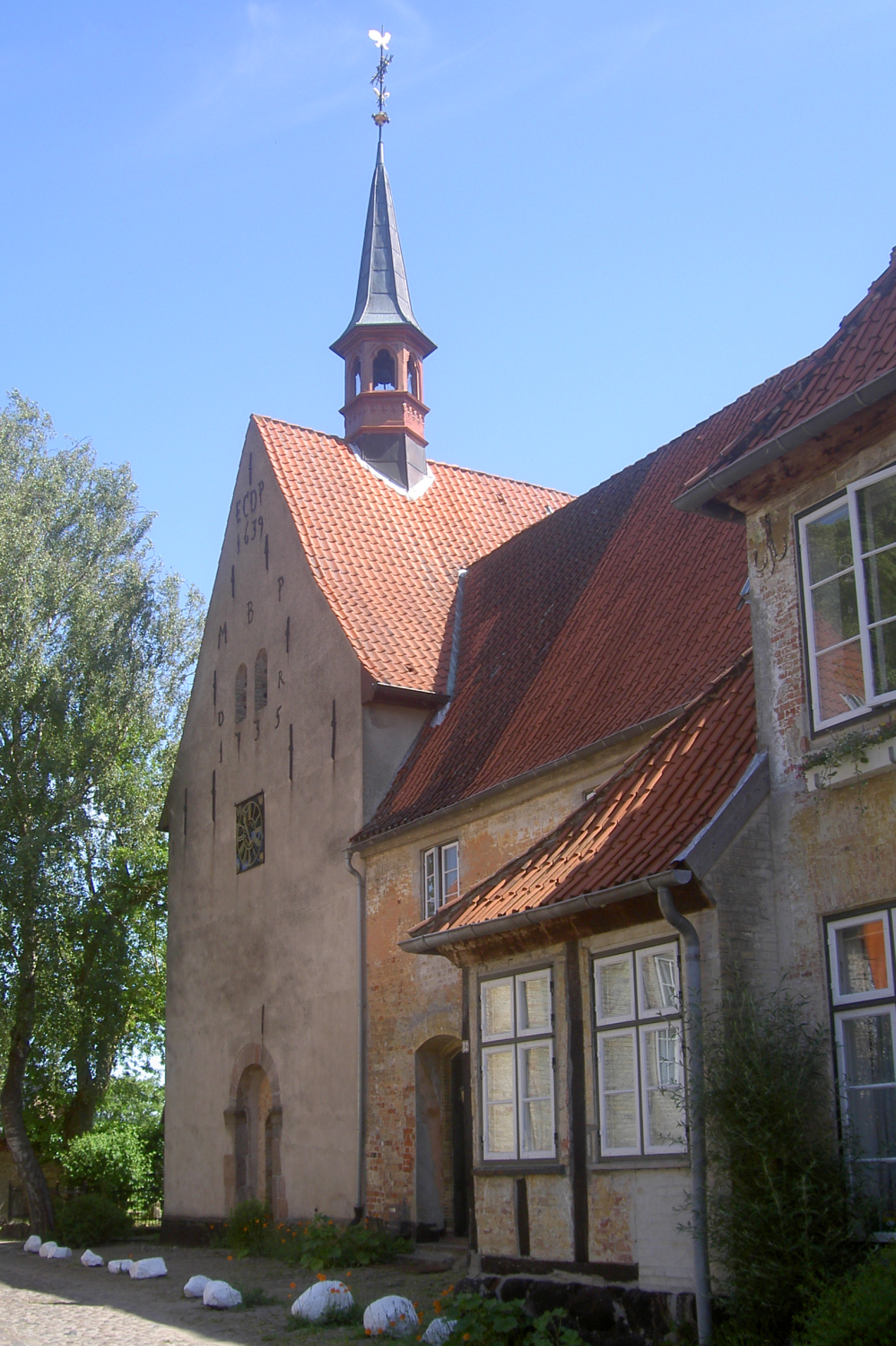
St. John's Priory, Schleswig

== See also ==
- List of Christian monasteries in Brandenburg
- List of Christian monasteries in Mecklenburg-Vorpommern
- List of Christian monasteries in North Rhine-Westphalia
- List of Christian monasteries in Saxony
- List of Christian monasteries in Saxony-Anhalt
- List of Christian monasteries in Denmark

== Sources ==
- Klöster in Schleswig-Holstein (in German)
- Klöster, Stifte und Konvente in Schleswig-Holstein und Hamburg (in German)
