= List of Christian monasteries in Brandenburg =

This is a list of Christian religious houses, both dissolved and extant, in Brandenburg in Germany, including Berlin. Extant religious houses are marked in bold.

== Brandenburg ==
=== A ===
- **Alexanderdorf Abbey** (Kloster Alexanderdorf or Abtei St. Gertrud), Alexanderdorf in Am Mellensee: Benedictine nuns (extant from 1934)
- Altfriedland Abbey, see Friedland
- Angermünde Friary (Kloster Angermünde), Angermünde: Franciscan friars (second half of the 13th century-1543)

=== B ===
- Boitzenburg Abbey (Kloster Boitzenburg), Boitzenburg: Cistercian nuns (1271–1538; the former Benedictine nunnery Marienpforte was merged into the new foundation by 1281)
- Brandenburg an der Havel:
  - Dominican or St. Paul's Friary (Paulikloster): Dominican friars (1286-c1540)
  - Franciscan or St. John's Friary (Franziskanerkloster, Brandenburg): Franciscan friars (moved here from Ziesar; 1237-1538x1544)

=== C ===
- Chorin Abbey (Kloster Chorin), Chorin: Cistercian monks (1248–1542)
- Cottbus Friary (Kloster Cottbus), Cottbus: Franciscan friars (1290x1300-1537)

=== D ===
- Dobrilugk Abbey (Kloster Dobrilugk), Doberlug-Kirchhain: Cistercian monks (1165x1184-1541)

=== F ===
- Frankfurt Charterhouse (Kartäuserkloster Frankfurt/Oder), Frankfurt an der Oder: Carthusian monks (1396–1540)
- Franziskushof, see Zehdenick
- Friedland Abbey (Kloster Friedland), Altfriedland, Neuhardenberg: Cistercian nuns (1230–1540)

=== G ===
- Gramzow Abbey (Kloster Gramzow), Gramzow: Premonstratensian canons (c.1178-Reformation)

=== H ===
- **Heiligengrabe Abbey** (Kloster Stift zum Heiligengrabe), Heiligengrabe: Cistercian nuns (1287–1548); women's collegiate foundation, or Damenstift, and school (1549–1945); community of deaconesses (1946–1995); re-establishment of Stift under a new abbess (extant from 1996)
- Himmelpfort Abbey (Kloster Himmelpfort), Himmelpfort: Cistercian monks (1299–1541)

=== J ===
- Jüterbog:
  - Jüterbog Friary (Franziskanerkloster Jüterbog): Franciscan friars (third quarter of the 15th century-c1560)
  - Jüterbog Priory (Kloster Jüterbog): Cistercian nuns (1282-c.1540)

=== K ===
- Kyritz Friary (Franziskanerkloster Kyritz), Kyritz: Franciscan friars (c.1225[?]-1552)

=== L ===
- Lehnin Abbey (Kloster Lehnin), Kloster Lehnin: Cistercian monks (1180–1542); premises used for the establishment of the Luise-Henrietten-Stift for Protestant deaconesses (1911–1942; re-founded 2004)
- Lindow Abbey (Kloster Lindow), Lindow: Cistercian nuns (c.1290-1542); Protestant women's collegiate foundation, or Damenstift (1542–1638)
- Luise-Henrietten-Stift, see Lehnin

=== M ===
- Marienfliess Abbey (Kloster Marienfliess), Stepenitz in Marienfliess, in the Prignitz: Cistercian nuns (1231–1544); Protestant women's collegiate foundation, or Damenstift, later deaconesses (extant from 1544)
- Marienpforte Priory or Abbey (Kloster Marienpforte), near Flieth and Stegelitz: Benedictine nuns (1269; by 1281 had been merged into the new Cistercian foundation at Boitzenburg)
- Marienstern Abbey (Kloster Marienstern, formerly also Kloster Güldenstern), Mühlberg: Cistercian nuns (1228–1539); Claretians (extant from 2000)
- Marienwerder, see Seehausen

=== N ===
- Neuzelle Abbey (Kloster Neuzelle), Neuzelle: Cistercian monks (1268–1817)

=== S ===
- St. John's, Brandenburg, see Brandenburg an der Havel
- St. Paul's, Brandenburg, see Brandenburg an der Havel
- Seehausen Priory or Abbey (Kloster Seehausen or Kloster Marienwerder), Seehausen: Cistercian nuns (c.1239 x 1250 - 1543/44)
- Stepenitz, see Marienfliess

=== Z ===
- Zehdenick:
  - Franziskushof: Franciscan friars (extant from 1993)
  - Zehdenick Abbey (Kloster Zehdenick), Zehdenick: Cistercian nuns (c.1250-1540); Protestant women's collegiate foundation (1540–1945)
- Ziesar:
  - Ziesar Friary (Franziskanerkloster Ziesar): Franciscan friars (c.1226-1271; moved to Brandenburg an der Havel)
  - Ziesar Priory (Zisterzierinnenkloster Ziesar): Cistercian nuns (c.1330-1540); Protestant women's collegiate foundation, or Damenstift (1540–1610)
- Zinna Abbey (Kloster Zinna), Jüterbog: Cistercian monks (1170–1553)

== Berlin ==
- Berlin:
  - Greyfriars, Berlin (Graues Kloster, Berlin): Franciscan friars (probably 1249-Reformation)
  - **Regina Martyrum Carmel** (Karmel Regina Martyrum): Discalced Carmelite nuns (extant from 1982)

== See also ==
- List of Christian monasteries in Mecklenburg-Vorpommern
- List of Christian monasteries in North Rhine-Westphalia
- List of Christian monasteries in Saxony
- List of Christian monasteries in Saxony-Anhalt
- List of Christian monasteries in Schleswig-Holstein

== Sources and external links ==
- Zisterzienser in Brandenburg (in German)
