= List of Christian monasteries in Mecklenburg-Vorpommern =

This is a list of Christian religious houses in Mecklenburg-Vorpommern in Germany, including Rügen, extant and non-extant, and including houses of both men and women. Almost all religious houses were suppressed during the Reformation in the 16th century, except for a few women's houses which survived, some into the 20th century, as Lutheran collegiate foundations for unmarried daughters of the nobility. Since the reunification of Germany in 1990, a Franciscan friary has been established, as of 2008 located at Waren.

Religious house	Location	Dedication	Order	Notes
Broda Abbey	Broda, Neubrandenburg		Premonstratensian Canons	1170-Reformation
Dargun Abbey, now Schloss Dargun	Dargun		Cistercian monks	1172-1198; 1208-1552; the first foundation, in 1172 from Esrum Abbey in Denmark, was destroyed in 1198, when the monks abandoned the site and moved to Eldena; refounded in 1208 from Doberan Abbey; rebuilt as Schloss Dargun (Dargun Castle), 1562-1945
Dobbertin Abbey	Goldberg, Parchim		Benedictine monks to c. 1235, thereafter Benedictine nuns; after Reformation a Lutheran noblewomen's collegiate foundation (Damenstift)	c. 1220-1572; 1572-1918
Doberan Abbey	Bad Doberan		Cistercian monks	1171-1552
Eldena Abbey, formerly Hilda	Greifswald		Cistercian monks	1199-1535; Eldena was built for the dispossessed Danish monks formerly at Dargun Abbey
Franciscan Friary, Greifswald (Grey Friars)	Greifswald		Franciscan friars	1242-1556
Dominican Priory, Greifswald (Black Friars)	Greifswald		Dominican friars	dates tbe
Güstrow Friary, Güstrow	Güstrow		Franciscan friars	1509-1552
Hiddensee Abbey	Kloster, Hiddensee		Cistercian monks	1296-1534
Ivenack Abbey (now Schloss Ivenack)	Ivenack		Cistercian nuns	1252-1550s
Malchow Abbey	Malchow, Müritz		formerly Magdalen Penitents (OSMM), moved from Röbel; Cistercian nuns from 1298; Lutheran noblewomen's collegiate foundation (Damenstift) from 1572	1298-1572; 1572-1923; now houses the Mecklenburg Organ Museum
Franciscan Friary, Neubrandenburg (I)	Neubrandenburg		Franciscan friars	1248-1552
Franciscan Friary, Neubrandenburg (II)	Neubrandenburg		Franciscan friars	1998-2004; moved to Waren
Neuenkamp Abbey	Franzburg		Cistercian monks	1231/33-1535
Franciscan Friary, Parchim	Parchim		Franciscan friars	1246-1552
Rehna Abbey or Priory	Rehna		Benedictine nuns	c. 1230-1552
Ribnitz Abbey	Ribnitz-Damgarten		Poor Clares to 1586; thereafter Lutheran noblewomen's collegiate foundation (Damenstift)	1325-1586; 1586-1918; now the German Amber Museum
Franciscan Friary, Ribnitz	Ribnitz-Damgarten		Franciscan friars	1324-1553
Magdalen Penitents	Röbel		Magdalen Penitents	13th century; moved to Malchow
Marienehe Charterhouse or Rostock Charterhouse	Rostock		Carthusian monks	1396-1552
Franciscan Friary, Rostock	Rostock	Saint Catherine	Franciscan friars	1243-1534
Abbey of the Holy Cross, Rostock	Rostock	Holy Cross	Cistercian nuns to 1582; Lutheran noblewomen's collegiate foundation (Damenstift)	1270-1582; 1582-1920
Dominican Priory, Rostock	Rostock	Saint John	Dominican friars	before 1256-1531
Bergen Abbey (St. Mary's Abbey, Bergen)	Bergen auf Rügen, Rügen	Saint Mary	Cistercian nuns	late 12th century-Reformation
Rühn Abbey	Rühn near Bützow		Cistercian nuns; Lutheran noblewomen's collegiate foundation (Damenstift)	1232-Reformation; Reformation-1756; also a well-known girls' school
Franciscan Friary, Schwerin	Schwerin		Franciscan friars	1236-1552
Sonnenkamp Abbey or Priory	Neukloster		Benedictine nuns	1219-1555
Stolpe Abbey	Stolpe near Anklam		Benedictine monks; from 1304, Cistercian monks	1153-1534
Dominican Priory, Stralsund	Stralsund	Saint Catherine of Siena	Dominican friars	before 1251-1525
Franciscan Friary, Stralsund	Stralsund		Franciscan friars	1254-1525
St. John's Hospital, Stralsund	Stralsund		Knights Hospitallers	dates tbe
Abbey of St. Anne and St. Bridget, Stralsund	Stralsund	Saint Anne and Saint Bridget of Sweden	Bridgettines	c. 1420-1525
Tempzin Hospital	Tempzin near Brüel, Parchim	Saint Anthony	Hospital Brothers of St. Anthony	1222-1550; preceptory and hospital
Grobe Abbey	Grobe, Usedom		Premonstratensian Canons	c. 1155-1309; moved to Pudagla; also known as Usedom Abbey
Pudagla Abbey	Pudagla, Usedom		Premonstratensian Canons	1309-1535; also known as Usedom Abbey
Krummin Abbey or Priory	Krummin, Usedom		Cistercian nuns	1302/03-1563
Franciscan Friary, Waren	Waren		Franciscan friars	from 2004; extant; moved to Waren from Neubrandenburg
Blackfriars, Wismar; Schwarzes Kloster	Wismar		Dominican friars	1293-1564
Franciscan Friary, Wismar	Wismar		Franciscan friars	1251-1527
Zarrentin Abbey	Zarrentin		Cistercian nuns	1248-1552

== See also ==
- List of Christian monasteries in Brandenburg
- List of Christian monasteries in North Rhine-Westphalia
- List of Christian monasteries in Saxony
- List of Christian monasteries in Saxony-Anhalt
- List of Christian monasteries in Schleswig-Holstein

== Sources ==
- Klosterstätten in Mecklenburg-Vorpommern (in German)
- AufNachMV.de: Monasteries (in German)
- Mecklenburg-VorpommernWeb.de (in German)
- Kulturportal Mecklenburg-Vorpommern (in German)
- Waren Friary website: Franciscans in Mecklenburg-Vorpommern (in German)
