= Sittichenbach Abbey =

- Kloster Sittichenbach, Kloster Sichem
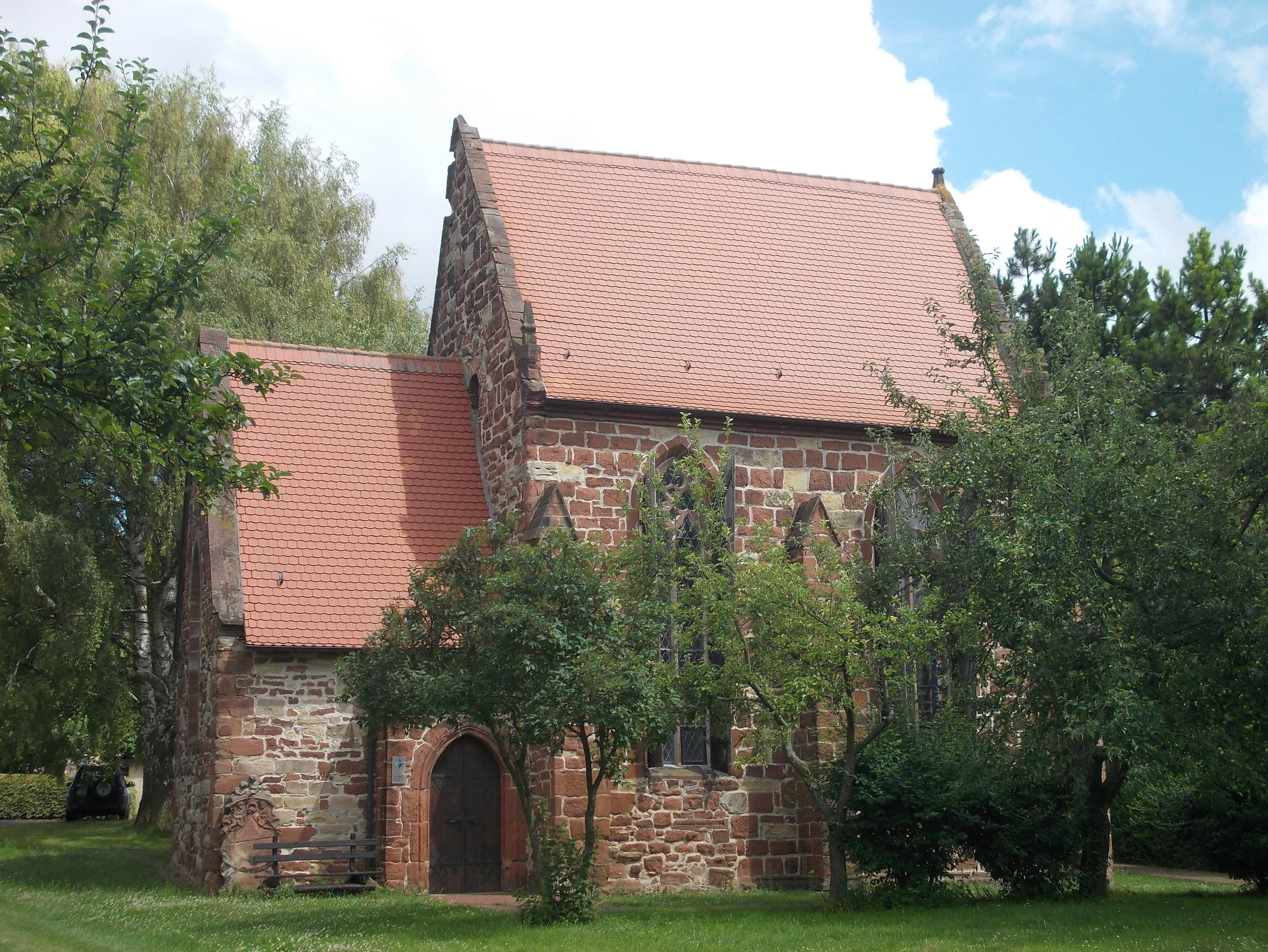
- Abbot's chapel

- Location within Saxony-Anhalt Location within Germany

Monastery information
- Order: Cistercians
- Established: 1141
- Disestablished: 1540
- Mother house: Walkenried Abbey

People
- Founder: Esiko II of Bornstedt

Architecture
- Functional status: remains partly restored

Site
- Location: Sittichenbach, Osterhausen, Germany
- Coordinates: 51°27′55″N 11°31′03″E
- Visible remains: altered chapels, fishponds, dovecote
- Public access: yes

Sittichenbach Abbey (Kloster Sittichenbach), sometimes also known as Sichem Abbey, is a Cistercian monastery in Sittichenbach, now part of Osterhausen near Eisleben in the Mansfeld-Südharz district, Saxony-Anhalt, Germany.

== First foundation ==
The abbey was founded as a daughter house of Walkenried Abbey in 1141 by Esiko II of Bornstedt, under the first abbot Volkuin. The new foundation rapidly acquired extensive lands on which to establish farms. In 1180 monks from Sittichenbach, at the request of margrave Otto I of Brandenburg, established Lehnin Abbey. Later foundations were Buch Abbey near Leisnig (1192) and Grünhain Abbey in the Erzgebirge (1235). In 1208, Bishop Conrad of Halberstadt retired to Sittichenbach.

In 1346 the abbey suffered greatly from a feud between Ludwig von Meißen, Bishop of Halberstadt, and the Count of Mansfeld. The abbot and monks were taken hostage and treated so harshly that several of them died. The Count of Mansfeld was excommunicated as a result of this incident.

In 1540 in the course of the Reformation the abbey was dissolved. It was at first in the possession of the Counts of Mansfeld and transferred by them in 1612 to John George I, Elector of Saxony.

From this time onwards the abbey premises were used for local government purposes. Amt Sittichenbach passed in 1656 to Saxe-Weissenfels and from 1686 to 1745 to the Principality of Saxe-Querfurt, after which it was included in the Electorate or Kingdom of Saxony. It was incorporated into the new Prussian state in 1815.

== Second foundation ==
After the reunification of Germany in 1990, the lands and remaining buildings were returned after nearly 500 years to the Cistercian order. They have done much restoration, including a re-building of the chapel which is used for daily prayer. Other buildings have been added and restored so that the site has become a hotel and retreat centre. An open field has been developed into an area for meditative walks which includes gardens, worship spaces, shrines and a labyrinth.

There are a few remains of the original abbey buildings still to be seen: among them are the abbots' chapel, the fishpond and the dovecote.
