= List of Christian monasteries in North Rhine-Westphalia =

This is a list of Christian religious houses, both for men and for women, whether or not still in operation, in North Rhine-Westphalia, Germany. Most religious houses survived the Reformation, although many nunneries did so by becoming Lutheran collegiate foundations for women of the aristocracy (Damenstifte). The great majority were closed however during the secularisation of the Napoleonic period, with the exception of the hospital orders, such as the Alexians and their female equivalents, the Cellite Sisters, the number of whose houses is a notable feature of the Land. Also noteworthy are the small communities of local origin, such as the Olpe Sisters (Sisters of St. Francis of Perpetual Adoration) and the Schervier Sisters (Poor Sisters of St. Francis). Extant religious houses are indicated by bold type.

== A ==
- Aachen:
  - Aachen Priory: Dominicans 1293–1802; Sisters of the Poor Child Jesus 1842–today
  - Alexian Hospital, Aachen (with St. Alexius' Church) (Alexianer Krankenhaus Aachen and Alexiuskirche Aachen): Alexians 1334–today
  - Christenserine motherhouse (14th century – 1973; moved to the Haus Maria im Venn, Stolberg)
  - Convent of the Poor Sisters of Saint Francis, Aachen: Poor Sisters of St. Francis, also known as the Schervier Sisters, 1852–today
  - St. Anne's Abbey or Priory, Aachen, now St. Anne's Church, Aachen (Kloster St. Joachim und Anna, now the Annakirche): Benedictine nuns 1511–1794
  - St. Jöris' Abbey, see St. Jöris
- Abdinghof Abbey or Priory (Abdinghofkloster), Paderborn: Benedictine monks 1015–1803
- Altenberg Abbey (Abtei Altenberg), Altenberg: Cistercian monks 1133–1803
- Arnsberg:
  - Jesuit Mission, Arnsberg (Jesuitenmission Arnsberg) 1651–1773
- Attendorn:
  - Attendorn Friary (Franziskanerkloster Attendorn): Franciscan friars 1636–1803
  - Ewig Priory, Attendorn, see Ewig
  - Waldenburg Commandery, Attendorn, see Waldenburg

== B ==
- Haus Carola, Bad Waldliesborn, Lippstadt: Olpe Sisters (Sisters of St. Francis of Perpetual Adoration; dates tbe)
- Beckum Abbey (Kollegiatstift St. Stephanus), Beckum: men's collegiate foundation 1267–1811
- Bedburg Abbey (Marienstift Bedburg), Bedburg-Hau: Premonstratensians, before 1138 – c. 1270; regular canonesses c. 1270–1519; secular canonesses 1517–1802; moved to Cleves in 1604
- Belecke Priory (Propstei Belecke), Belecke, Warstein: Benedictine monks 1270–1804
- Benden Abbey (Kloster Benden), Heide, Brühl: Cistercian nuns 1207–1802
- Benninghausen Abbey (Kloster Benninghausen), Benninghausen, Lippstadt: Cistercian nuns 1240–1804
- Bentlage Priory (Kloster Bentlage), Bentlage, Rheine: Canons Regular of the Order of the Holy Cross 1437–1803
- Beyenburg Abbey, see Steinhaus Abbey
- Redemptorist Fathers, Bochum
- Böddeken Abbey (or Priory), Büren: women's collegiate foundation (Frauenstift) 836 – 11th century; secular canonesses 11th century – 1408; re-founded as Augustinian Canons under the Windesheim Congregation 1408/09 – 1803
- Bödingen Priory (Kloster Bödingen), Hennef: Augustinian Hermits 1424–1803
- Boke Abbey (Kloster Boke), Boke, Delbrück: Benedictine monks 1101–1104 (moved to Flechtdorf Abbey in Hesse)
- Redemptorist Fathers, Bonn
- St. Remigius' Abbey, Borken (Kollegiatstift St. Remigius), Borken: men's collegiate foundation 1433–1811
- Bottenbroich Abbey, later Bottenbroich Priory (Kloster Bottenbroich), Kerpen: Cistercian nuns 1231 (or 1253)–1448; Cistercian monks 1448–1802
- Brauweiler Abbey (Abtei Brauweiler), Pulheim: Benedictine monks 1024–1803
- Bredelar Abbey (Kloster Bredelar), Bredelar, Marsberg: Premonstratensians, approximately 1170–1196; Cistercian monks 1196–1804
- Brenkhausen Abbey (Kloster Brenkhausen), Brenkhausen near Höxter: Cistercian nuns c1245 re-settled with Benedictine nuns from Corvey 1601–1803; from 1993 monastery and bishop's seat of the Coptic Church in Germany
- Brilon Friary (Minoritenkloster Brilon), Brilon: Friars Minor 1653–1803
- Brunnen Priory (Kloster Brunnen), Sundern: Capuchin Friars 1722–1834
- Burtscheid Abbey (Abtei Burtscheid), Burtscheid, Aachen: Benedictine monks 997–1220; Cistercian nuns 1220–1802

== C ==
- Cappenberg Abbey (Kloster Cappenberg), later Schloss Cappenberg (Cappenberg Castle), Selm: Premonstratensian Canons 1122–1802/03
- Clarenberg Priory (Kloster Clarenberg), Hörde, Dortmund: Poor Clares 1339–1583: secular canonesses 1583–1812
- Clarholz Abbey (or Priory) (Stift or Kloster Clarholz), Herzebrock-Clarholz: Premonstratensian canons before 1146–1803 (fdd 1133 in Lette in Oelde as a double monastery, but separated by 1146, and canons moved to Clarholz, while nuns stayed in Lette)
- Cleves Abbey or Priory (Stift Kleve), Cleves: canons 1334–1802
- Cologne:
  - Redemptorist Fathers, Cologne (dates tbe)
  - Alexian Hospital, Cologne (Alexianer Krankenhaus Köln): Alexians 1300–today
  - St. Anthony's Hospital, Cologne (Antoniterkloster; church now the Antoniterkirche) 1350 x 1378–1794
  - Cologne Charterhouse (Kartäuserkloster Köln): Carthusians 1334–1794
  - St. Elisabeth's House, Cologne: Olpe Sisters (dates tbe)
  - St. Elisabeth's Convent, Cologne: (Cellitinnen zur heiligen Elisabeth): Cellite Sisters (dates tbe)
  - St. Gertrude's Priory (Kloster Sankt Gertrud): tbe
  - St. Mary's Convent, Cologne (Cellitinnen zur heiligen Maria): Cellite Sisters (dates tbe)
  - Convent of the Cellite Sisters of the Rule of St. Augustine, Cologne (Cellitinnen nach der Regel des hl. Augustinus): Cellite Sisters (dates tbe)
- Corvey Abbey (Kloster Corvey), Höxter: Benedictine monks 822–1807

== D ==
- Dalheim Priory or Abbey (Kloster Dalheim), Dalheim, Lichtenau: Austin Canons 1429–1803
- Deutz Abbey (Abtei Deutz), Deutz, Cologne: Benedictine monks 1003–1804
- Dorsten:
  - Dorsten Friary (Franziskanerkloster Dorsten): Franciscan friars 1488–today
  - St. Michael's Carmel, Dorsten (Karmel St. Michael): Discalced Carmelites 1998–today
  - Ursuline Convent, Dorsten (Ursulinenkloster Dorsten): Ursuline Sisters 1699–today
- Drolshagen Abbey or Priory (Kloster Drolshagen), Drolshagen: Cistercian nuns 1235–1803
- St. Victor's Abbey or Priory, Dülmen (Stift St. Viktor, Dülmen), Dülmen: men's collegiate foundation 1323–1811
- Düren:
  - Düren Priory or Carmel (Karmelitinnenkloster Düren), Düren: Discalced Carmelites 1903–today
  - St. Gertude's Convent, Düren: Cellite Sisters (dates tbe)
- Convent of the Cellite Sisters, Düsseldorf (Cellitinnenkloster Düsseldorf), Düsseldorf: Cellite Sisters (dates tbe)

== E ==
- Elsey Abbey or Priory (Kloster Elsey), Hohenlimburg, Hagen: secular canonesses 1220–1810
- Wallfahrtstätte Eremitage, Niederdielfen, Wilnsdorf: Poor Clares 1953–today
- Eikeloh Priory (Propstei Eikeloh), Erwitte: Premonstratensian nuns 1639–1803
- Eschweiler:
  - Alexian Hospital, Eschweiler (Alexianerkloster Eschweiler) 1909–1944
  - Helene-Nickel-Stift, Röhe: tbe
- Essen Abbey (Stift Essen), Essen: secular canonesses 845–1803
- Ewig Priory or Abbey (Kloster Ewig), Attendorn: Austin Canons 1420–1803

== F ==
- St. Boniface's Abbey, Freckenhorst (Stift Sankt Bonifatius, Freckenhorst), Freckenhorst in Warendorf: secular canonesses 851-1811
- Fröndenberg Abbey or Priory (Stift Fröndenberg), Fröndenberg: Cistercian nuns 1225 x 1230-c 1650; secular canonesses (Damenstift) c1650-1812
- Fürstenberg Abbey (Kloster Fürstenberg), Xanten: Benedictine monks and nuns 1116-1259; Cistercian nuns 1259-1586

== G ==
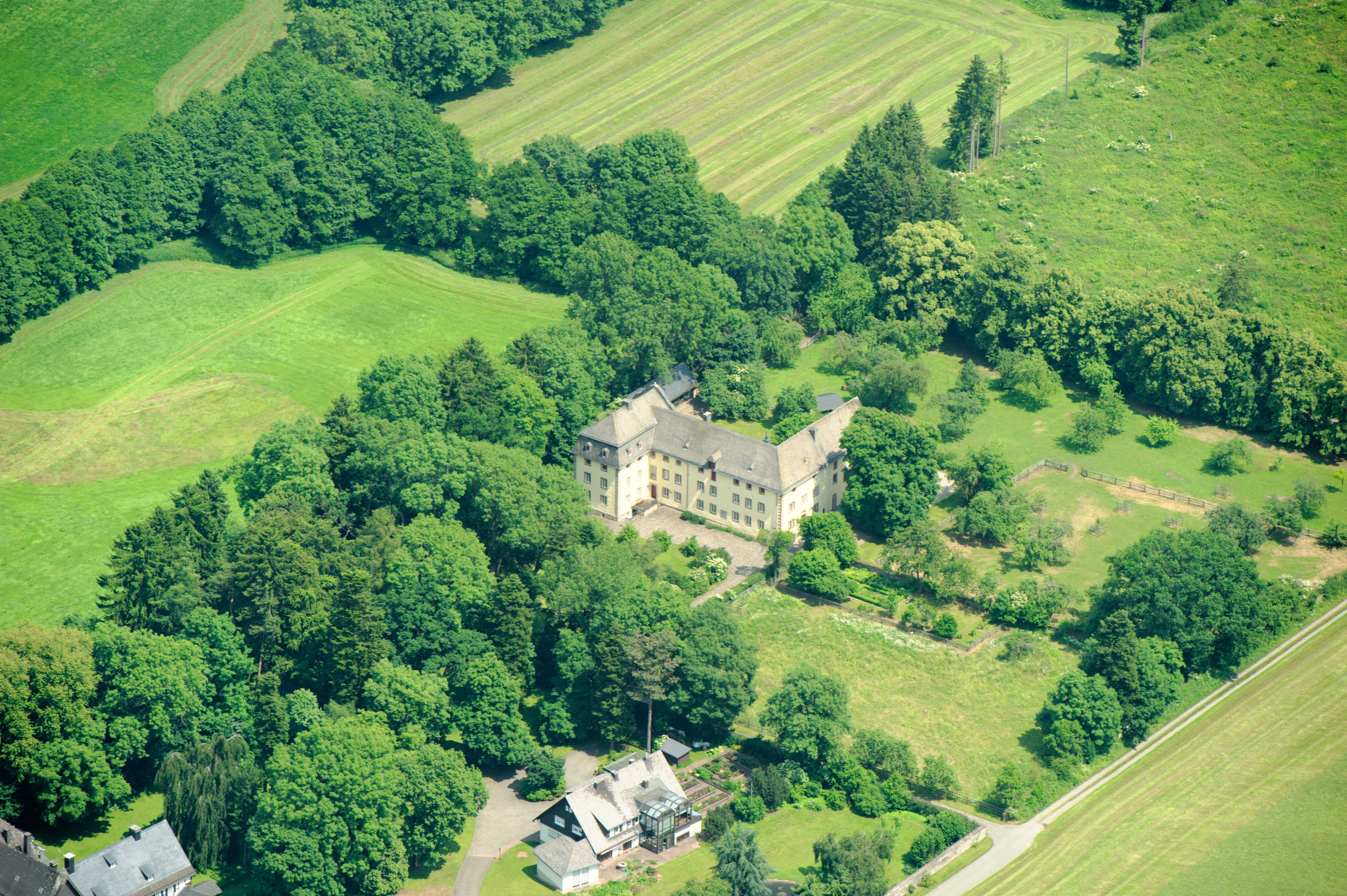
Kloster Glindfeld aus südwestlicher Richtung

- Galilee Priory (Kloster Galiläa) near Meschede: Dominican nuns 1484-1810
- Gehrden Abbey (Kloster Gehrden), Gehrden, Brakel: Benedictine nuns 1142-1810
- Geistingen Priory (Kloster Geistingen) in Geistingen, Hennef: Redemptorists 1903-1941; orphanage 1941-1946; educational purposes to 2006
- Gerleve Abbey (Abtei Gerleve), Billerbeck: Benedictine monks 1899-today
- Gerresheim Abbey (Stift Gerresheim), Gerresheim, Düsseldorf: secular canonesses 9th century – 1803
- Gertrudisstift, Ruppichteroth: Mission Sisters of the Precious Blood (Missionsschwestern vom Kostbaren Blut), also known as the Mariannhiller Sisters, 1916-today
- Geseke:
  - Geseke Abbey or Priory (Frauenstift Geseke): secular canonesses 946-1823
  - Franciscan friary, Geseke: Franciscan friars 1637-1834
- Gevelsberg Abbey (Kloster Gevelsberg), Gevelsberg: Cistercian nuns c1230 x 1236-c 1577; secular canonesses (Damenstift) c 1577-1812
- Glindfeld Priory (Augustinerinnenkloster Glindfeld), Medebach: Augustinian Canonesses 1298-1499; Canons Regular of the Holy Cross 1499-1804
- Goch Priory (Tertiarinnenkloster Goch), Goch: Franciscan Tertiaries (dates tbe)
- Graefenthal Abbey or Priory (Kloster Graefenthal), Kessel, Goch: Cistercian nuns 1248-1802
- Gräfrath Abbey (Kloster Gräfrath), Gräfrath, Solingen: Benedictine nuns, before 1209-1802
- Grafschaft Abbey (Kloster Grafschaft), Schmallenberg: Benedictine monks 1072-1804; Sisters of Mercy of Saint Charles Borromeo 1948-today
- Gravenhorst Abbey or Priory (Kloster Gravenhorst), Hörstel: Cistercian nuns 1256-1808

== H ==
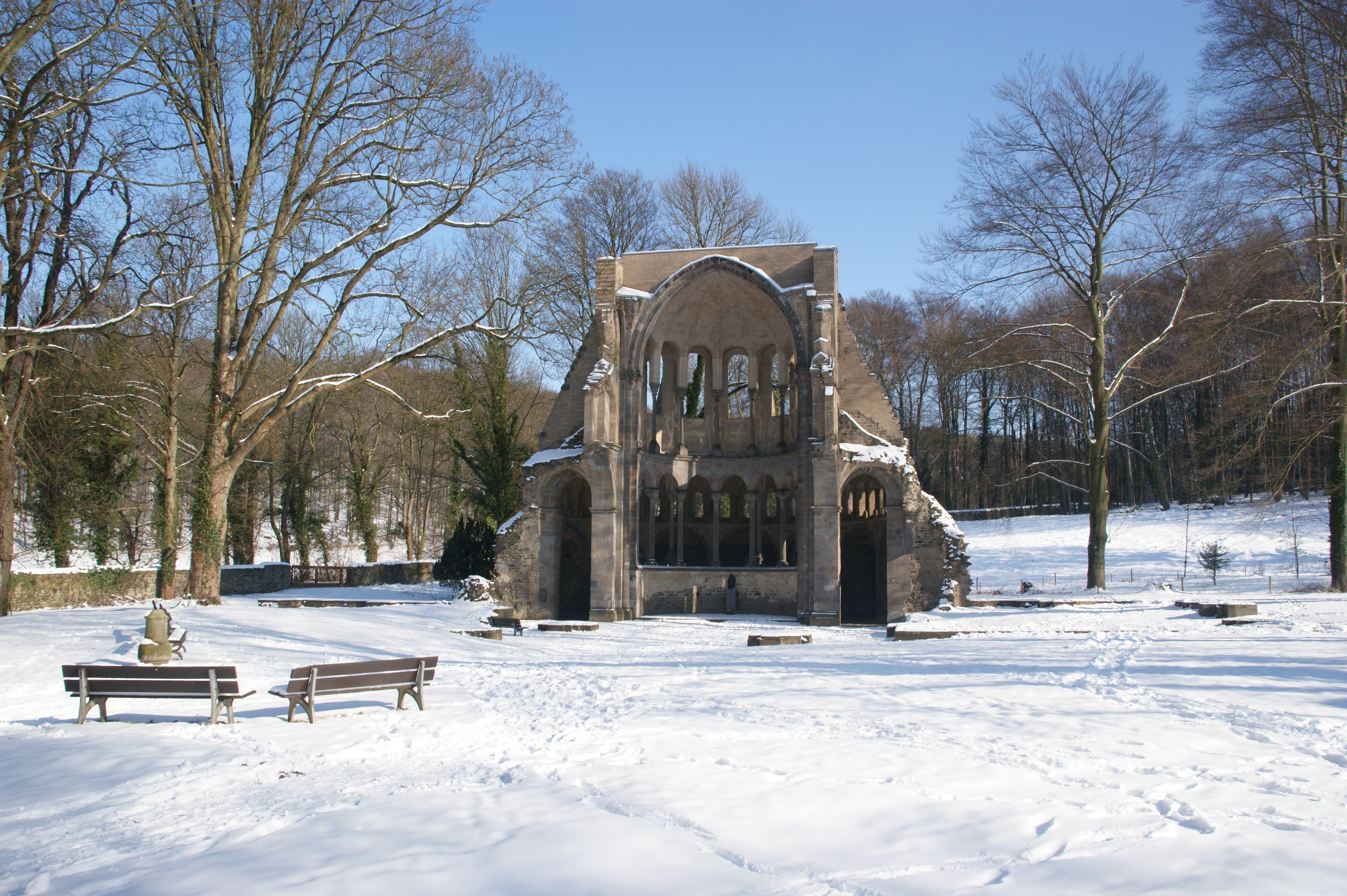
Heisterbach Abbey, Königswinter: ruins of choir

- Hagenbusch Abbey (Kloster Hagenbusch), Xanten: Benedictine nuns c. 1140-1802
- Haldem Abbey or Priory (Damenstift Haldem or Karolinen-Stift), otherwise Schloss Haldem (Haldem Castle), Haldem, Stemwede: women's collegiate foundation 1878-1890
- Hamborn Abbey (Abtei Hamborn), Hamborn, Duisburg: Premonstratensian Canons 1136-1802, 1959-today
- Hamm Friary (Franziskanerkloster Hamm), Hamm: Franciscan friars 1455-1824
- Hardehausen Abbey (Kloster Hardehausen), Warburg: Cistercian monks 1140-1803, 1927–1938
- Herstelle Abbey, otherwise Abbey of the Holy Cross, Herstelle (Abtei vom Hl. Kreuz, Herstelle), Beverungen: Friars Minor nk-1825; Benedictine nuns of the Most Holy Sacrament 1899-1924; Benedictine nuns 1924-today
- Heisterbach Abbey (Kloster Heisterbach), Königswinter: Cistercian monks 1192-1803
- Herford:
  - Herford Abbey (Stift Herford), Herford: secular canonesses 800-1802
  - St. John's and St. Denis's Abbey or Priory, Herford (Stift St. Johann und Dionys, Herford): secular canons 947-1414
- Herzebrock Abbey or Priory (Stift Herzebrock), Herzebrock-Clarholz: secular canonesses c860-1208; Benedictine nuns 1208-1803
- Himmelpforten Abbey (Kloster Himmelpforten), Möhnesee: Cistercian nuns 1246-1804
- Hirschberg Abbey or Priory (Kloster Hirschberg), Hirschberg, Warstein: Benedictine nuns 1513-1804
- Hohenbusch Priory (Haus Hohenbusch or Kloster Hohenbusch), Erkelenz: Canons Regular of the Holy Cross 1302-1802
- Holthausen Priory or Abbey (Kloster Holthausen, now Gut Holthausen), Büren: Cistercian nuns 1243-1810
- St. Gertrude's Priory or Abbey, Horstmar (Kollegiatstift St. Gertrud, Horstmar), Horstmar: secular canonesses 1325-1806

== J ==
- St. Nicholas' Priory, Jüchen (Nikolauskloster, Jüchen), Jüchen: Franciscan Tertiaries 1403-1802; Franciscan oblates 1953-today

== K ==
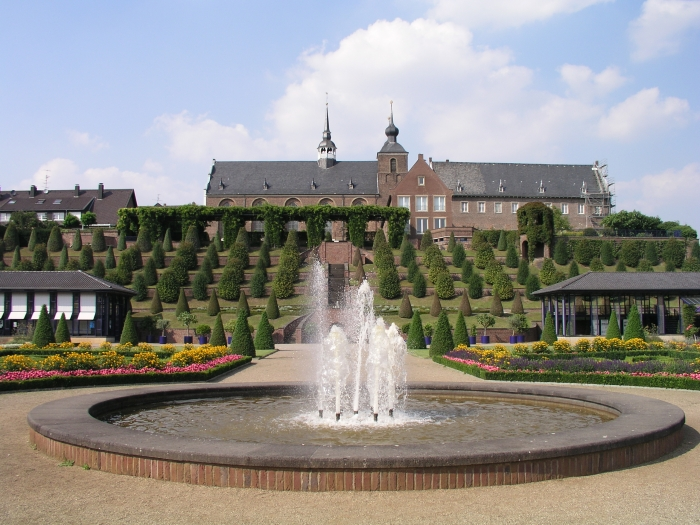
Kamp Abbey, Kamp-Lintfort

- Kamp Abbey (Kloster Kamp or Altenkamp), Kamp-Lintfort: Cistercian monks 1123-1802; Carmelites 1954-2002
- Kappenberg, see Cappenberg
- Kentrop Priory (Haus Kentrop otherwise Kloster Kentrop), Hamm: Cistercian nuns 1290-1802 (moved here from Marienhof)
- Keppel Abbey (Stift Keppel), Allenbach, Hilchenbach: Premonstratensian nuns 1236-1594; women's collegiate foundation 1594-1812
- Knechtsteden Abbey (Kloster Knechtsteden), Dormagen: Premonstratensian Canons 1138-1801; Spiritans 1895-today
- Königsmünster Abbey (Abtei Königsmünster), Meschede: Benedictine monks 1928-today
- Kornelimünster Abbey (Abtei Kornelimünster), Kornelimünster, Aachen: Benedictine monks 814-1802, 1906-today
- Kranenburg:
  - Katharinenhof Kranenburg: Augustinian women's community 1445-1802
  - St. Martin's Priory (Stift St. Martin, Kranenburg): canons, 1436-1802 (moved here from Zyfflich)
- Kreitz Priory (Kloster Kreitz), Holzheim, Neuss: Benedictine nuns 1899-today
- Küstelberg Priory (Augustinerinnenkloster Küstelberg), Winterberg: Augustinian Canonesses 1177-1297

== L ==
- Langwaden Abbey or Priory (Kloster Langwaden), Hülchrath, Grevenbroich: Premonstratensian nuns 1145-1802; Cistercian monks 1964-today
- St. Mary's Priory, Lemgo (Kloster Sankt Maria, Lemgo), Lemgo: Dominican nuns (dates tbe)
- Lette Abbey or Priory (Kloster Lette), Lette, Oelde: Premonstratensian double monastery 1133-before 1146; canons moved to Clarholz before 1146, thereafter Premonstratensian nuns (end date tbe)
- St. Elisabeth's House, Hitdorf, Leverkusen: Olpe Sisters (dates tbe)
- Levern Priory or Abbey (Stift Levern), Levern, Stemwede: Cistercian nuns 1227-1558; secular canonesses 1558-1810
- Liesborn Abbey (Abtei Liesborn), Wadersloh: Benedictine nuns 785 (or 815)-1131; Benedictine monks 1131-1803
- Lübbecke Priory or Abbey (Stift St. Andreas, Lübbecke), Lübbecke: canons 1295-1810
- St. Anthony's Convent, Lüdinghausen (St.-Antonius-Kloster, Lüdinghausen), Lüdinghausen: Franciscan Sisters of the Atonement and the Love of Christ, also known as the Lüdinghauser Sisters, c. 1900-today

== M ==
- Maria Frieden Abbey or Dahlem Abbey (Abtei Maria Frieden), Dahlem: Trappist nuns 1952-today
- Mariawald Abbey (Abtei Mariawald), Heimbach: Cistercian monks 1480-1795, Trappists 1862-today
- Marienbaum Abbey (St. Mariä Himmelfahrt, Marienbaum or Birgittenkloster Marienbaum), Xanten: Brigittine double monastery 1460-1802
- Marienborn Abbey (Kloster Marienborn), Burbach, Hürth: Cistercian nuns 1233-1802
- Marienborn Priory (Kloster Marienborn), Lütgendortmund: Beguines (dates tbe)
- Marienfeld Abbey (Kloster Marienfeld), Harsewinkel: Cistercian monks 1185-1803; Benedictine monks 2004-today
- Marienhof Priory or Abbey (Kloster Marienhof), Hamm: Cistercian nuns 1270-1290 (moved to Kentrop)
- Marienmünster Abbey (Abtei Marienmünster), Marienmünster: Benedictine monks 1128-1803; Passionists 1965-today
- Marienthal Priory or Marienthal Carmel, formerly Marienthal Abbey (Kloster Marienthal), Hamminkeln: Augustinian Hermits 1258-1806, Carmelites 1986-today
- Marsberg:
  - Marsberg Friary (Kapuzinerkloster Marsberg), Niedermarsberg: Capuchin Friars 1745–1812
  - Obermarsberg Abbey (Kloster Obermarsberg), Obermarsberg: Benedictine monks, 8th century – 1803
- Merten Priory (Kloster Merten), Merten, Eitorf: Augustinian Hermits (female) 1160-1802
- Meschede Abbey (Stift Meschede), Meschede: secular canonesses 870-1310; canons 1310-1805
- Metelen Abbey (Stift or Kloster Metelen), Metelen: nuns (order unknown) 889-C13; canonesses (secular or regular, but Augustinian for some of the time) 13th century-late 15th century; women's collegiate foundation (Damenstift) late 15th century-1803
- Michaelsberg Abbey (Abtei Michaelsberg), Siegburg: Benedictine monks 1064-1803, 1914-today
- St. Maurice's Abbey, Minden (Kloster Sankt Mauritius, Minden), Minden: tbe
- Mönchengladbach:
  - Mönchengladbach Abbey (Abtei Mönchengladbach or Rathaus Abtei): Benedictine monks 1663-1802
  - Neuwerk Priory (Kloster Neuwerk), Neuwerk, Mönchengladbach: anchorites 1133-1250; Benedictine nuns 1250-1802; Salvatorian Sisters 1879-1889; Lüdinghauser Franciscan Sisters 1889-1961; Salvatorian Sisters 1961-today
  - St. Francis' House, or Franciscan Hospital (Franziskushaus): hospital of the Franciscan Sisters of the Atonement and the Love of Christ (dates tbe)
- Mörmter Friary (Kloster Mörmter), Mörmter: Franciscan friars, 1922-today
- Mülheim Commandery, later Mülheim Priory or Friary (Deutschordenskommende Mülheim), Mülheim, Warstein: Teutonic Knights 1266-1809; Olpe Sisters 1885-1994; "Community of the Blessed Declarations", 1995-today
- Münster:
  - Alexian Hospital, Münster (Alexianer-Krankenhaus Münster), Münster: Alexians (date tbe)-today
  - St. Ludger's Abbey or Priory, Münster (Stift St. Ludgeri, Münster): collegiate foundation 1173-1811
  - St. Martin's Abbey or Priory, Münster (Stift St. Martini, Münster): collegiate foundation 1187-1811
  - St. Maurice's Abbey or Priory, Münster (Stift St. Mauritz, Münster): collegiate foundation, after 1064-1811

== N ==
- Neuss:
  - Alexian Hospital, Neuss (Alexianer Krankenhaus Neuss) Neuss: Alexians 1451-today
  - Immaculata Convent (Kloster Immaculata), in the former Villa Leuchtenberg: Barmherzige Schwestern nach der Regel des hl. Augustinus (Merciful Sisters of the Rule of St. Augustine, aka Augustine Sisters of Neuss): 1923-today
  - St. Joseph's Convent (Josefskloster, Neuss): Barmherzige Schwestern nach der Regel des hl. Augustinus (Merciful Sisters of the Rule of St. Augustine, aka Augustine Sisters of Neuss): 1858-1923
  - Kreitz Abbey, Neuss, see Kreitz
- Neuwerk Priory or Friary, see Mönchengladbach

== O ==
- Obermarsberg Abbey, see Marsberg
- Odacker Priory (Kloster Odacker), Hirschberg, Warstein: early days obscure, but possibly some sort of small religious establishment from c. 1000; cell of Augustinian canonesses probably from 13th century, although not mentioned explicitly until 1508; Benedictine nuns (not later than) 1513-1804
- Oedingen Abbey or Priory (Damenstift Oedingen), Oedingen, Lennestadt: women's collegiate foundation 1000-1533
- Oelinghausen Monastery (Kloster Oelinghausen), Oelinghausen, Arnsberg: Premonstratensian Canons 1174-1804
- Olpe Priory (Kloster Olpe), Olpe: Franciscan Sisters of Perpetual Adoration at Olpe, or Olpe Sisters, after 1863-today

== P ==
- Paderborn Friary (Franziskanerkloster Paderborn), Paderborn: Franciscan friars 1232-today
- Paradiese Priory (Kloster Paradiese), Soest: Dominican nuns 1252-1808

== Q ==
- Quernheim Abbey or Priory (Stift Quernheim), Kirchlengern: Augustinian Canonesses, prob. 1147-1532; secular canonesses 1532-1810

== R ==
- Ramersdorf Commandery (Kommende Ramersdorf), Ramersdorf: Knights Hospitallers (dates tbe)
- Reichenstein Abbey (Kloster Reichenstein), Kalterherberg in Monschau: Premonstratensian double monastery 1131/36-date tbe, when canons moved to Steinfeld Abbey; Premonstratensian nuns to 1487; replaced by Premonstratensian canons from Steinfeld 1487-1802; construction work on premises for Benedictine monastery begun in 2008
- Rengering Abbey or Priory (Kloster Rengering), Ostbevern: Cistercian nuns 1247-1803
- Rüthen:
  - Capuchin friars (dates tbe)
  - Augustinian canonesses (dates tbe)
- Rumbeck Abbey (Kloster Rumbeck), Arnsberg: Premonstratensian Canons 1190-1806

== S ==
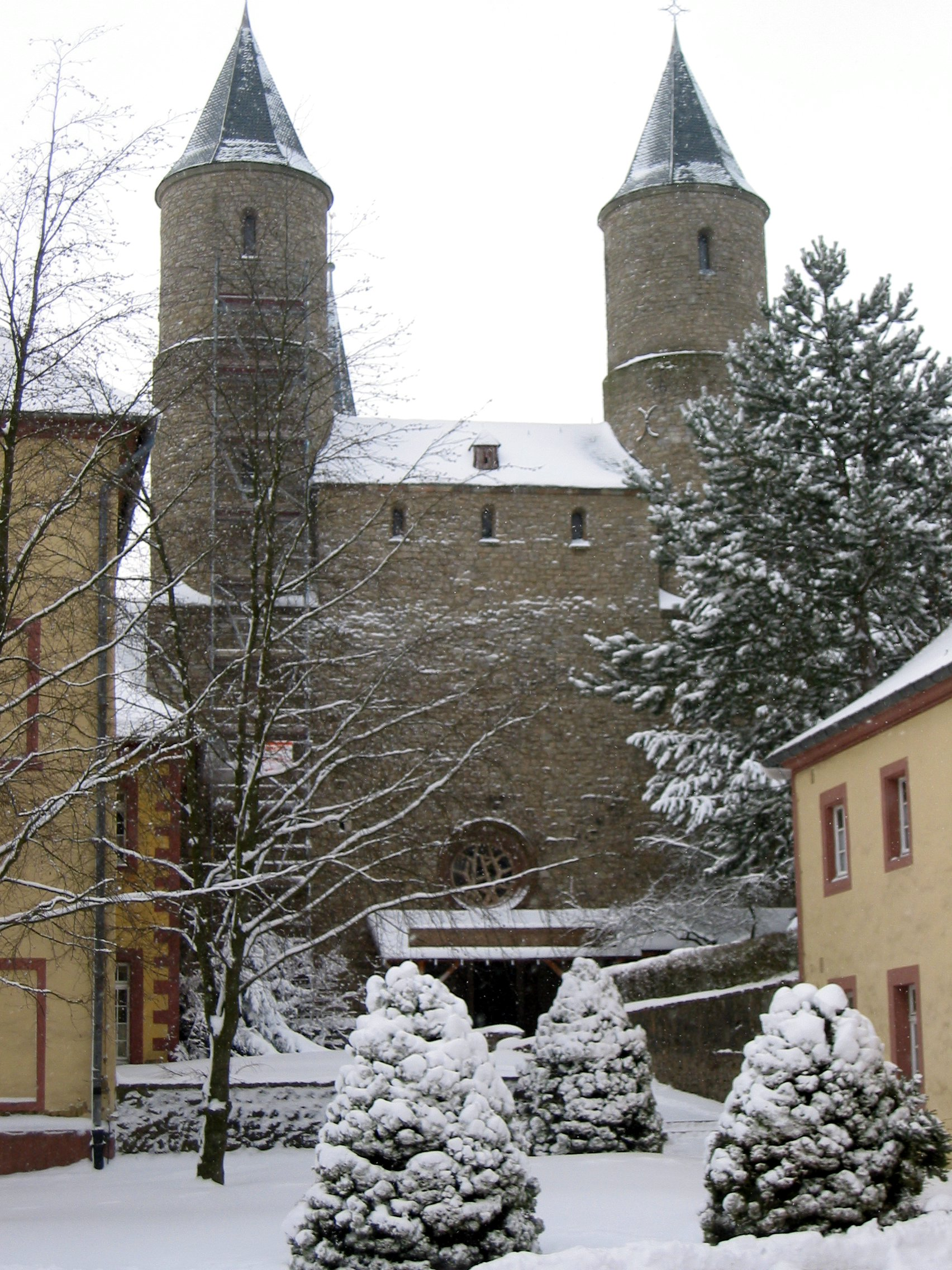
Basilica of Steinfeld Abbey, Kall

- Saarn Abbey (Kloster Saarn), Mülheim an der Ruhr: Cistercian nuns 1214-(date tbe); now Salesian Oblates
- St. Jöris' Abbey (Kloster St. Jöris), St. Jöris, Eschweiler, near Aachen: Cistercian nuns 1274-1802
- Scheda Abbey (Kloster Scheda), Wiehagen, Wickede: Premonstratensians 1243-1809
- Schwarzenbroich Priory (Kloster Schwarzenbroich), Langerwehe: Canons Regular of the Holy Cross 1340-1802
- Segenstal Abbey (Kloster Segenstal), Vlotho: Cistercian nuns, presumably about 1258-1430
- Seligenthal Priory (Kloster Seligenthal), Seligenthal, Siegburg: Franciscans 1231-1803
- Soest, see Paradiese Priory
- Steinfeld Abbey (Kloster Steinfeld), Kall: Premonstratensian Canons 1130-1802; Salvatorians 1923-today
- Steinhaus Abbey also known as Beyenburg Abbey (Kloster Steinhaus or Kloster Beyenburg), Beyenburg, Wuppertal: Canons Regular of the Holy Cross 1298-1804 and 1964-today
- Stiepel Priory (Kloster Stiepel), Stiepel, Bochum: Cistercian monks 1988-today
- Haus Maria im Venn, Venwegen, Stolberg: Christenserines (Christenserinnen, a congregation of Cellite Sisters) 1973-today (moved here from the motherhouse in Aachen)
- Störmede Priory, also known as Nazareth Priory (Augustinerinnenkloster Störmede, Kloster Nazareth or Annenkloster), Störmede, Geseke: Augustinian canonesses 1483-1804

== U ==
- Überwasser Abbey (Kloster Überwasser), Münster: secular canonesses 1040-1773

== V ==
- Varensell Abbey (Abtei Varensell), Rietberg, Gütersloh: Benedictine nuns of the Most Holy Sacrament 1902-1982; Benedictine nuns 1982-today
- Varlar Abbey (Stift Varlar), Varlar: tbe
- Convent of the Cellite Sisters, Viersen: Cellite Sisters (dates tbe; a subsidiary house of the Cellite Sisters of Düsseldorf, later of Stolberg)
- Vreden Abbey (Stift Vreden), Vreden: tbe

== W ==
- Waldenburg Commandery (Deutschordenskommende Waldenburg), Attendorn: Teutonic Knights 1638-1692
- Wedinghausen Abbey (Stift Wedinghausen), Arnsberg: Premonstratensian Canons 1170-1803
- Werden Abbey (Kloster or Abtei Werden), Essen: Benedictine monks 800-1803
- Werne Friary (Kapuzinerkloster Werne), Werne: Capuchin Friars 1659-1843, 1887-today
- Wiedenbrück:
  - St. Giles' Abbey or Priory (Stift St. Aegidius, Wiedenbrück): collegiate foundation (dates tbe)
  - Wiedenbrück Friary (Franziskanerkloster Wiedenbrück): Franciscan friars 1644-today
- Wipperfürth Friary (Franziskanerkloster Wipperfürth), Wipperfürth: Franciscan friars 1657-1818
- Wormen Abbey (Kloster Wormen), Wormen: tbe
- St. Ursula's Abbey, Wuppertal (Kloster Sankt Ursula, Wuppertal), Wuppertal: tbe

== X ==
- Xanten:
  - St. Agnes' Priory, Xanten (Agnetenkloster Xanten): Poor Clares 1402-1605; Cistercian and Benedictine nuns 1605-1802
  - Jesuit College, Xanten (Jesuitenkloster Xanten): Jesuits 1609-1802
  - Xanten Charterhouse (Karthaus Xanten): Carthusians 1628-1802
  - Xanten Cathedral chapter (Xantener Dom or Stift Xanten): cathedral chapter (dates tbe)

== Z ==
- Zweifall Carmel, Zweifall, Stolberg: Discalced Carmelites 1954-today
- Zyfflich Priory, also known as St. Martin's Priory (Stift St. Martin, Zyfflich), Zyfflich, Kranenburg: canons, 1002 x 1021-1436 (moved to Kranenburg)

== See also ==
- List of Christian monasteries in Brandenburg
- List of Christian monasteries in Mecklenburg-Vorpommern
- List of Christian monasteries in Saxony
- List of Christian monasteries in Saxony-Anhalt
- List of Christian monasteries in Schleswig-Holstein

== Sources and external links ==
- Landschaftsverbands Westfalen-Lippe: churches (in German)
- Landschaftsverbands Westfalen-Lippe: monasteries (in German)
- Landschaftsverbands Westfalen-Lippe: secularisation (in German)
- Orden.de (in German)
- Orden-Online.de (in German)
- Alexians in Germany (in German)
- Olpe Sisters website (in German)
- Lüdinghauser Sisters website (in German)
