= Grünhain Abbey =

- Zisterzienserabtei Grünhain
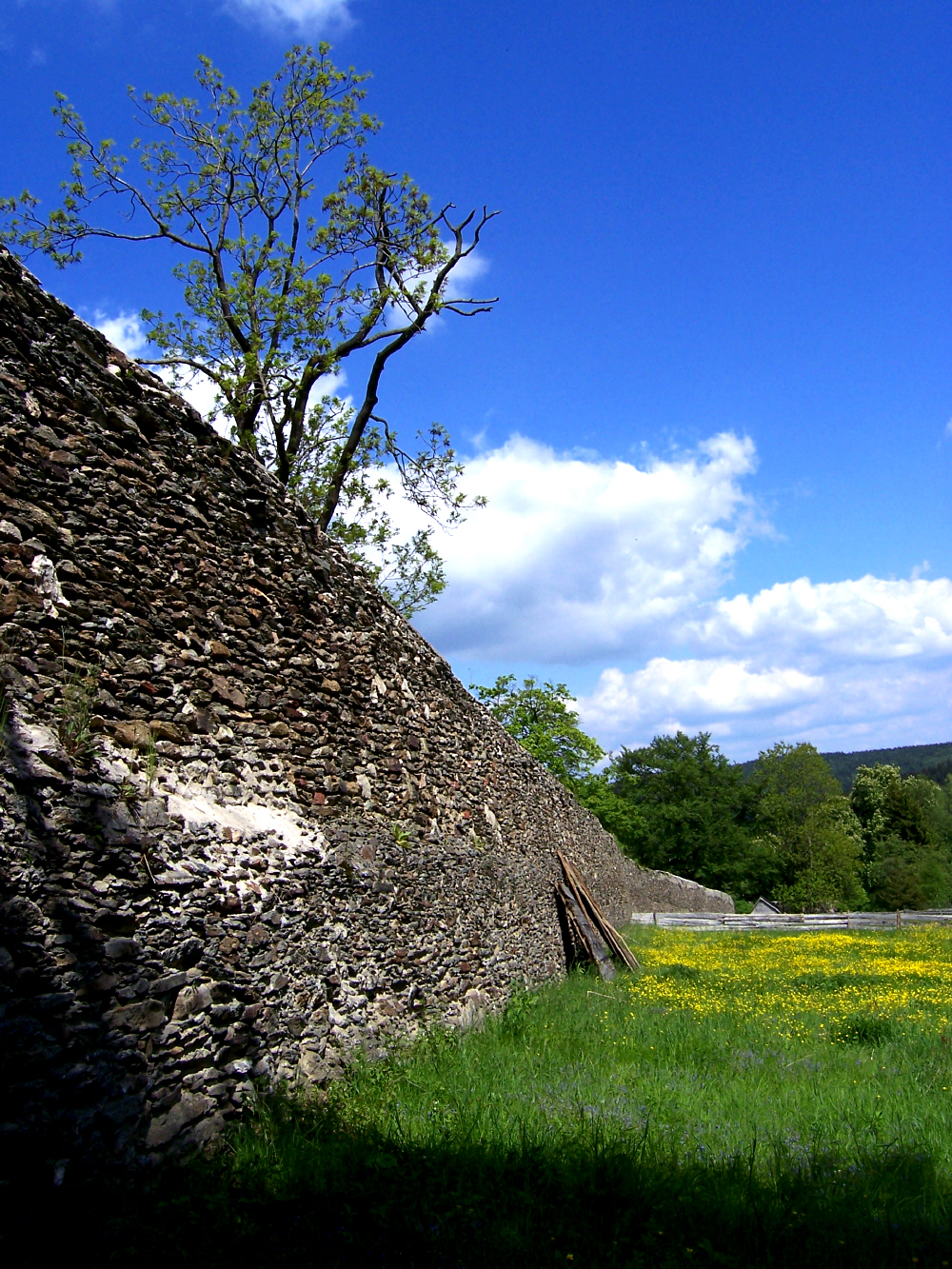
- Northern wall of the abbey

Monastery information
- Order: Cistercian
- Established: 1230
- Disestablished: 1536
- Mother house: Sittichenbach Abbey
- Diocese: Morimond Abbey

Site
- Location: Saxony; Germany
- Coordinates: 50.579561°N 12.811114°E

Grünhain Abbey (German: Kloster Grünhain) in Grünhain in the Saxon Ore Mountains, which was built and run by Cistercians, existed from 1230 to 1536. Today only its ruins remain.
