= Buch Abbey =

- Kloster Buch
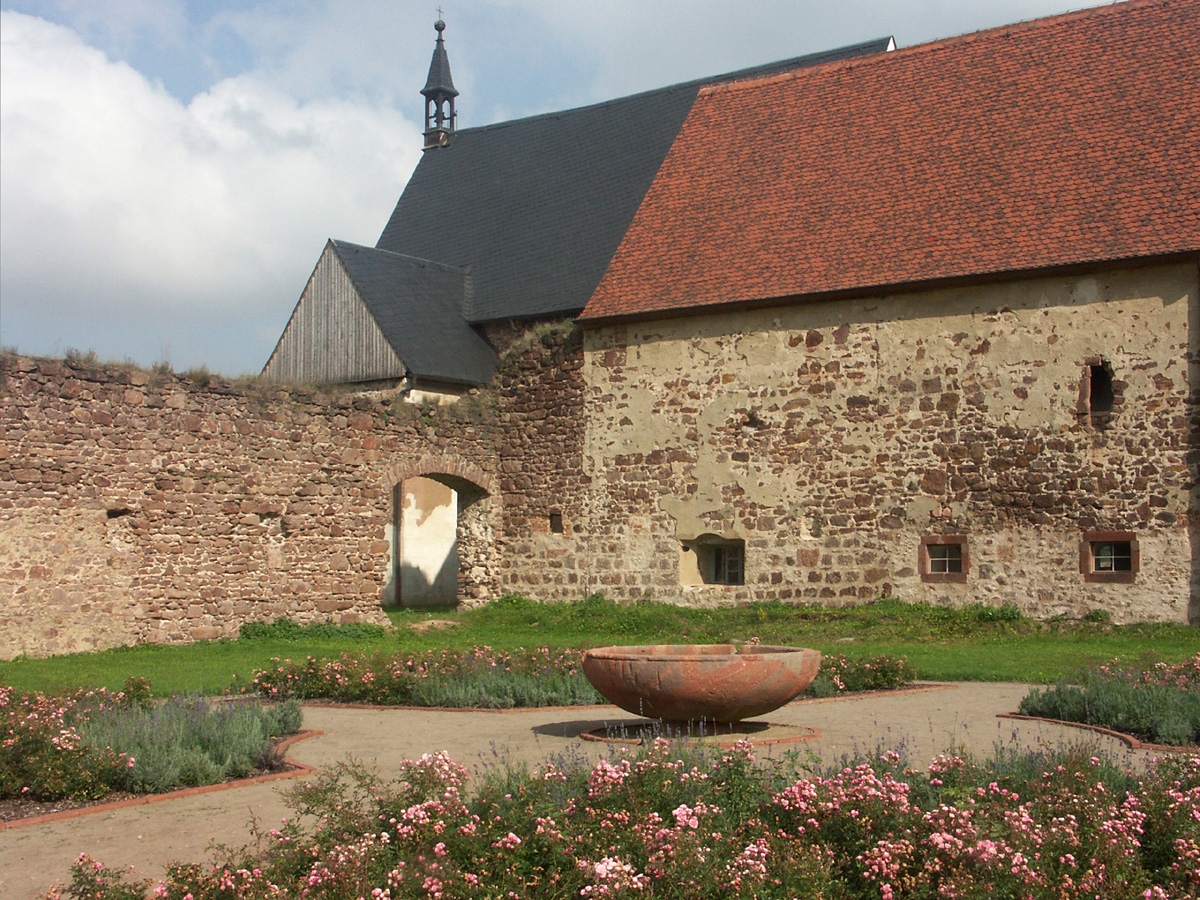
- Area of former cloister with chapter house and outer wall of church

- Location within Saxony Location within Germany
- Interactive map of Buch Abbey

Monastery information
- Order: Cistercians
- Established: 1192
- Disestablished: 1525
- Mother house: Sittichenbach Abbey
- Dedication: Mary

Architecture
- Status: dissolved
- Functional status: venue for exhibitions, tours, markets, and festivals
- Heritage designation: cultural and architectural monument

Site
- Location: Klosterbuch, Leisnig, Germany
- Coordinates: 51°09′08″N 12°59′13″E
- Visible remains: parts of church, chapter house, infirmarium, abbot's residence, several auxiliary buildings
- Public access: yes
- Website: www.klosterbuch.de

Buch Abbey, in German Kloster Buch, is a former Cistercian monastery near Leisnig in Saxony.

== Location ==
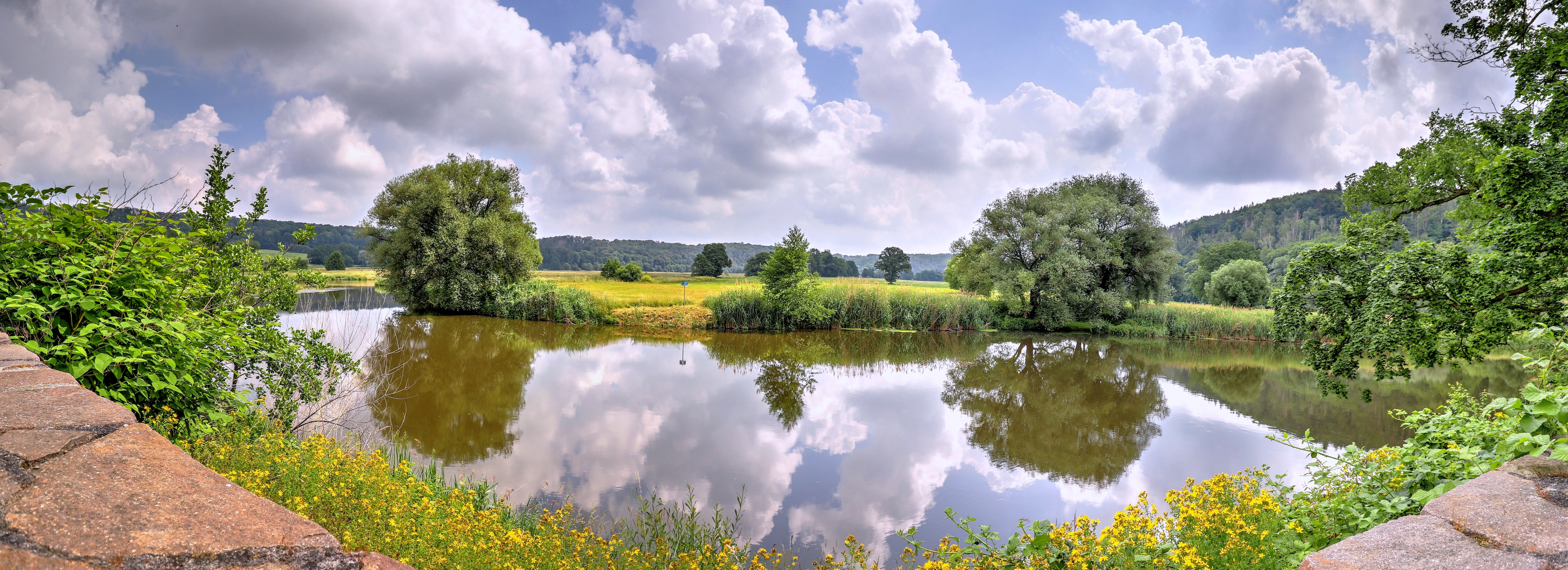
Freiberger Mulde near Kloster Buch

Kloster Buch is located approximately halfway between the cities Leipzig and Dresden, about 4 km east of the town of Leisnig in the Mittelsachsen district and in a bend of the river Freiberger Mulde. The floodplain of the latter is here about 800 m wide, bordered by forests and used for agriculture.

== History ==
=== From its foundation until the Protestant Reformation ===
Kloster Buch was first mentioned in a document of Emperor Heinrich IV who bestowed to it the parish of Leisnig According to Cistercian tradition, abbot Hildebert, twelve monks and twelve lay brothers left Sittichenbach Abbey in 1 August 1192 and reached Buch on 17 August 1192. Kloster Buch is therefore a filial abbey of Sittichenbach, their primary abbey is Morimond. The foundation of the new abbey was initiated by Burgrave Heinrich III of Leisnig, who resided in nearby Mildenstein Castle. Unlike other Cistercian monasteries, it was not founded in uninhabited parts.

The Burgraves of Leisnig gifted the monastery with many villages. It also possessed several granges in the surrounding regions as well as outposts in Leipzig and Oschatz, indication its participation in the medieval overland trade. In 1309 the monastery acquired the town of Belgern, where it established an ecclesiastical manor, together with its ferry across the river Elbe.

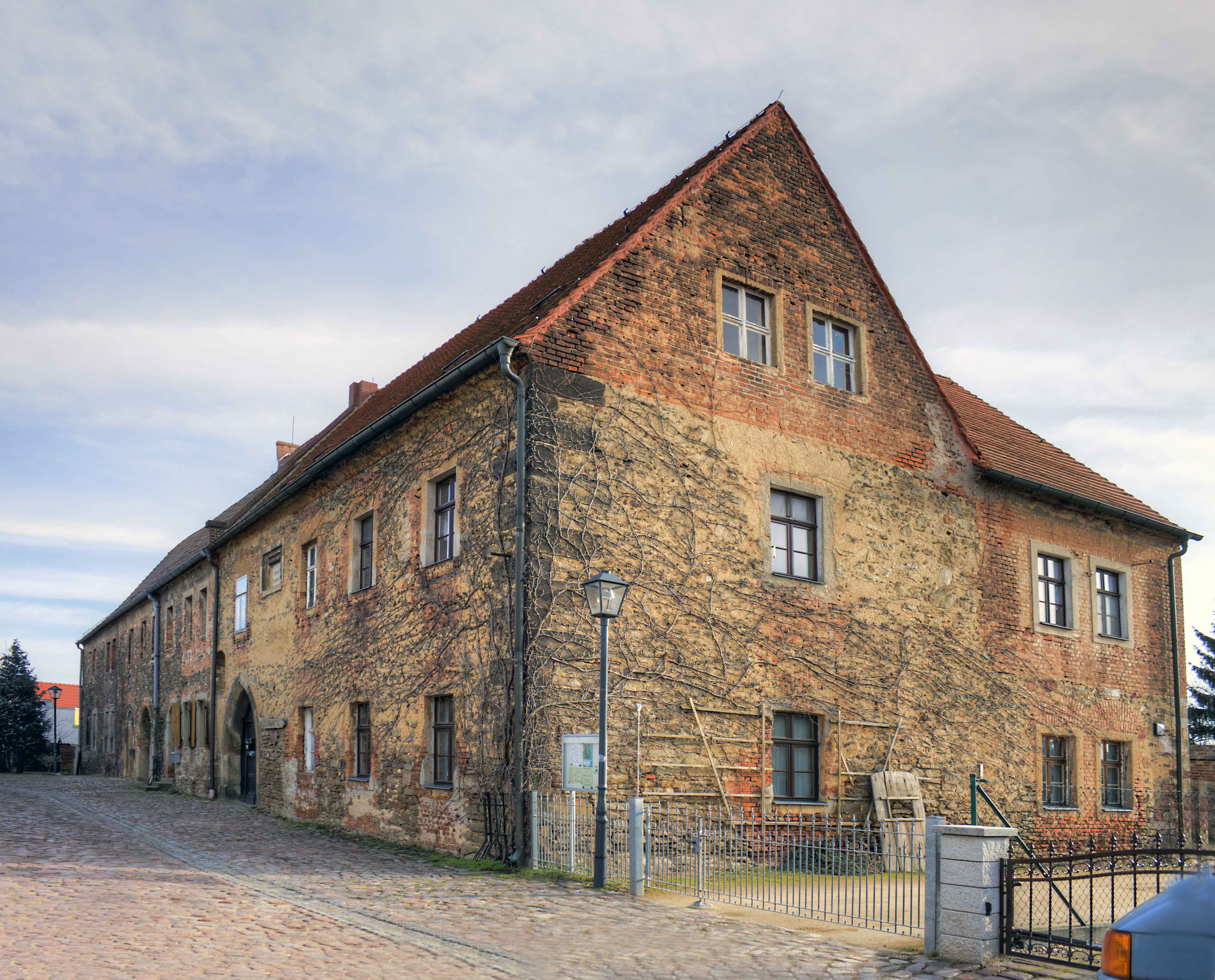
Manor buildings in Belgern, once belonging to Kloster Buch

The Margraves of Meißen, who forced the Burgraves of Leisnig to sell their burgraviate and who took possession of Mildenstein Castle in 1365, also bestowed the monastery with donations or had donations of their ministeriali transferred to it. Finally, the monastery held 52 villages.

The number of monks and lay brothers living in Kloster Buch has not been passed on. In the late Middle Ages most monks hailed from the local and neighbouring areas, the furthest known place of origin was Halle (Saale). In 1433 a manuscript bible was made in the monastery, and in 1441 the abbot gained privileges ordinarily reserved to bishops, such as to wear a mitre and a bishop's ring during Solemn Mass, and to consecrate objects for liturgical use. In the same year, the abbey was awarded a coat of arms by the Council of Basel, showing the Lamb of God, a flag with the Christian cross, and three roses symbolising Mary, the patron saint of the Cistercian order.

In 1486 a Cistercian school was founded in Belgern which prepared young monks for their studies, in particular at the Cistercian college of Leipzig University.

=== From dissolution until the 19th century ===
After abbot Antonius Dytz died on 20 December 1525, the monastery was dissolved in the course of the Protestant Reformation which had already prevailed in nearby Leisnig. Prince-elector John the Steadfast had the election of a new abbot suppressed and ordered the properties of the abbey to be administrated by his representative Kaspar Kitzscher. The monks were offered – according to their rank – parts of the property of the monastery as means of subsistence, or money to take up a civil trade. Alternatively, they were allowed remain on place.

The village of Klosterbuch grew from buildings surrounding the secularised monastery. In 1965 it was incorporated into Leisnig.

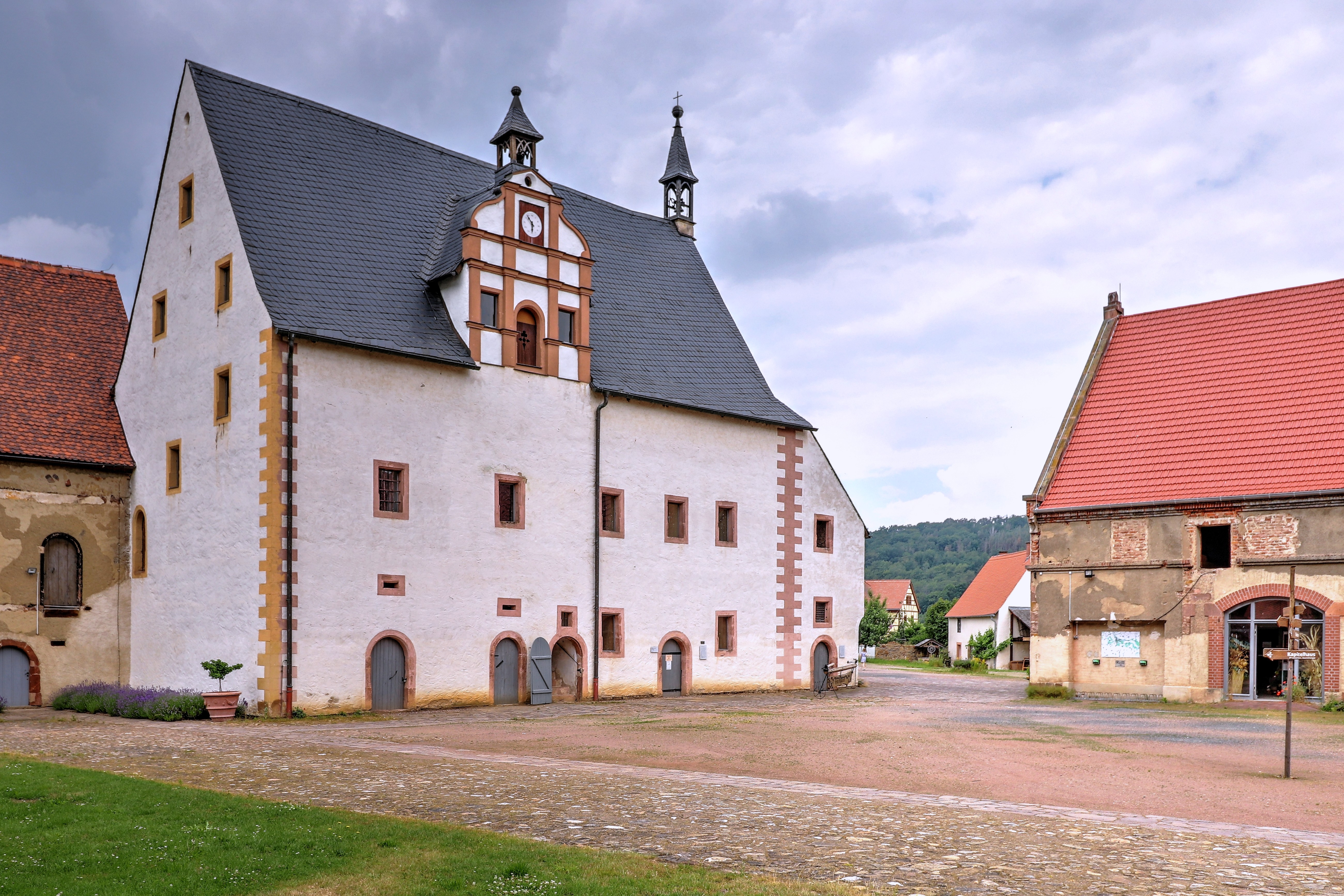
Manor chapel, seen from the courtyard

From 1532 on, the Landstände of Saxony took over the administration of the sequestered holdings of the monastery from the representatives of the Leisnig Amtmann More distant possessions were lost, while others were sold, such as the villages of Poselitz (1534) and Paudritzsch (1545). In 1548 the estate was put under the control of Klosteramt of Buch, and a register (Amtserbbuch) was compiled. In 1556, councilors of the Prince-elector took over the administration, and in 1567 the estate was given to Johann von Zeschau as a hereditary fiefdom, becoming a manor in the process. The Zeschau family had the abbot's house rebuilt and, probably around 1600, the manorial chapel built from the ruins of the choir of the abbey's church. During the Thirty Years' War the estate suffered much damage and had to be auctioned off. It was bought by Fürstenschule Grimma who had the manor chapel renovated and consecrated anew in 1678 by the church superintendent of Leisnig, and remained in possession of the estate until 1836, when it became property of the Saxon state.

=== 20th and 21st century ===
In the course of the agrarian reforms (Bodenreform) in the Soviet occupation zone the manor was transformed into a Volkseigenes Gut. In 1990 this became a GbR who, however, stopped using the former monastery premises for agricultural purposes in 1994. Restoration works started in 1992, directed by the town of Leisnig and its local history club. In 2000 the premises passed into the hands of the support association Förderverein Kloster Buch e.V., and transformation into a historico-cultural centre began.

Floods in 2002 caused severe damage which was completely repaired until 2008. Today the former abbey is used as a venue for exhibitions, guided tours and other events, among them a monthly farmer's market and the yearly monastery and harvest festival in September. Each year, Kloster Buch receives tens of thousands of visitors.

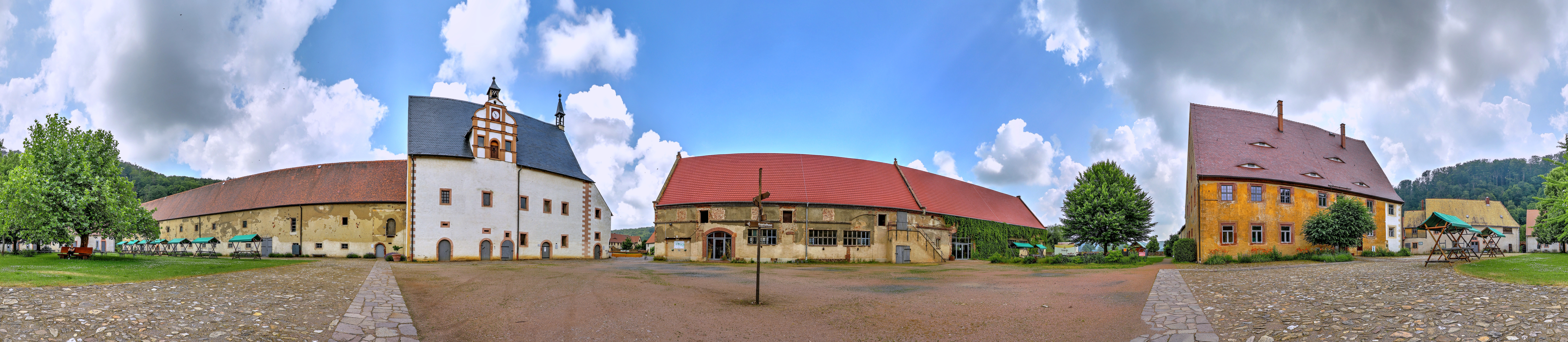
360-degree panorama of the monastery courtyard, the buildings are (from left): chapter house, manor chapel from remains of the former monastery church, entrance to the monastery area (at the northwest corner), so-called cowshed, Zehrgarten, Abthaus (abbot's residence), behind it is the infirmary and, on the far right, other farm buildings

== Buildings ==
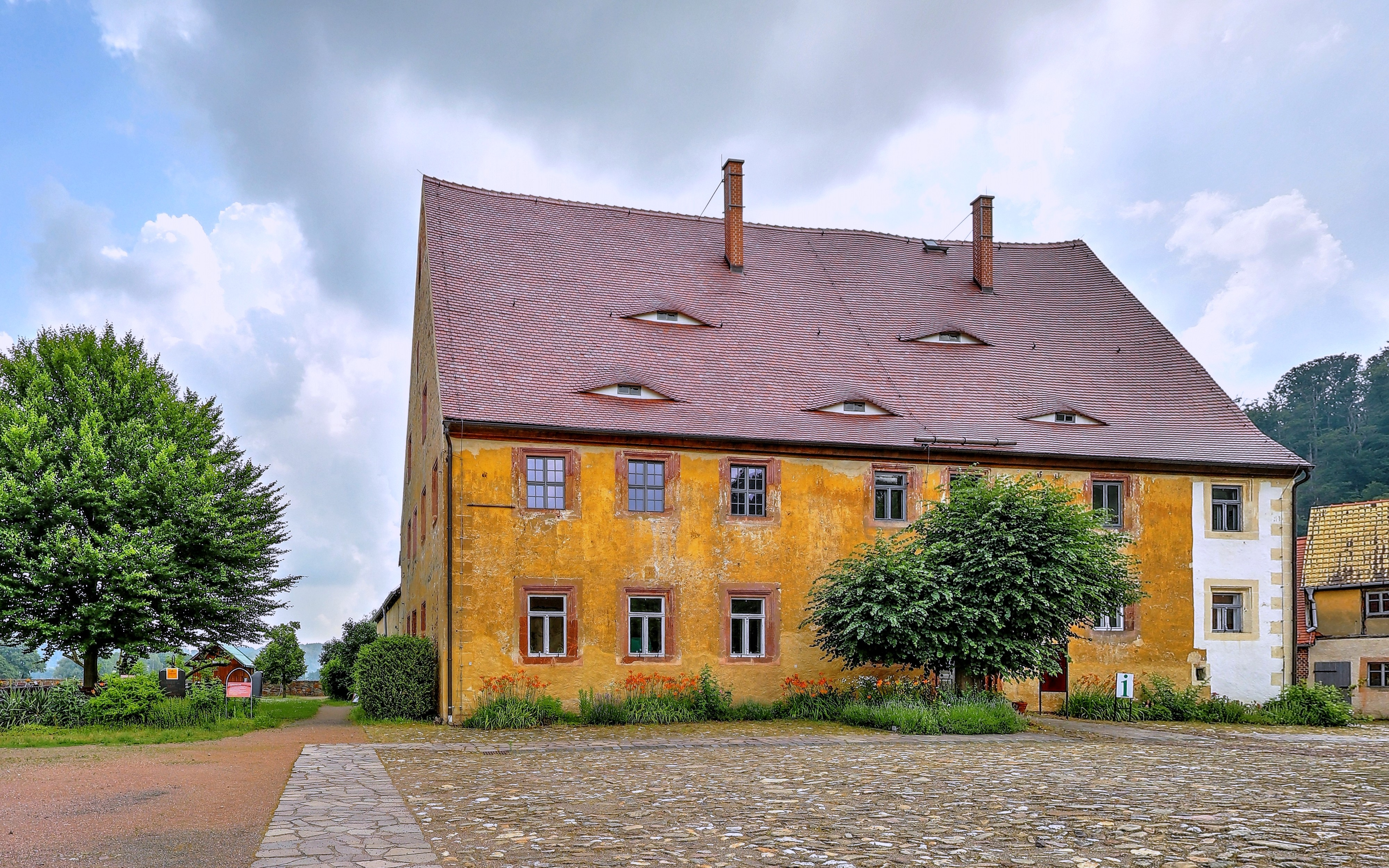
Abbot's residence

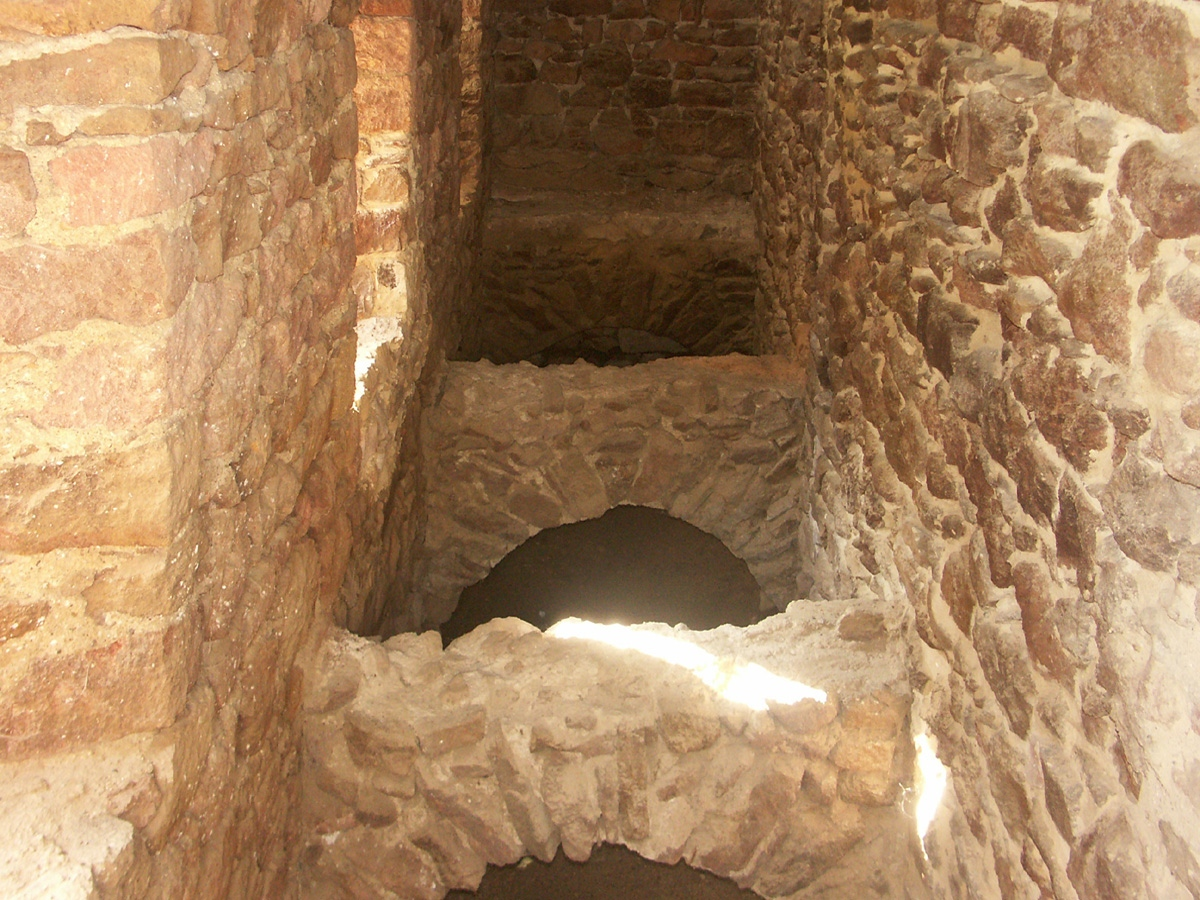
Remains of the necessarium

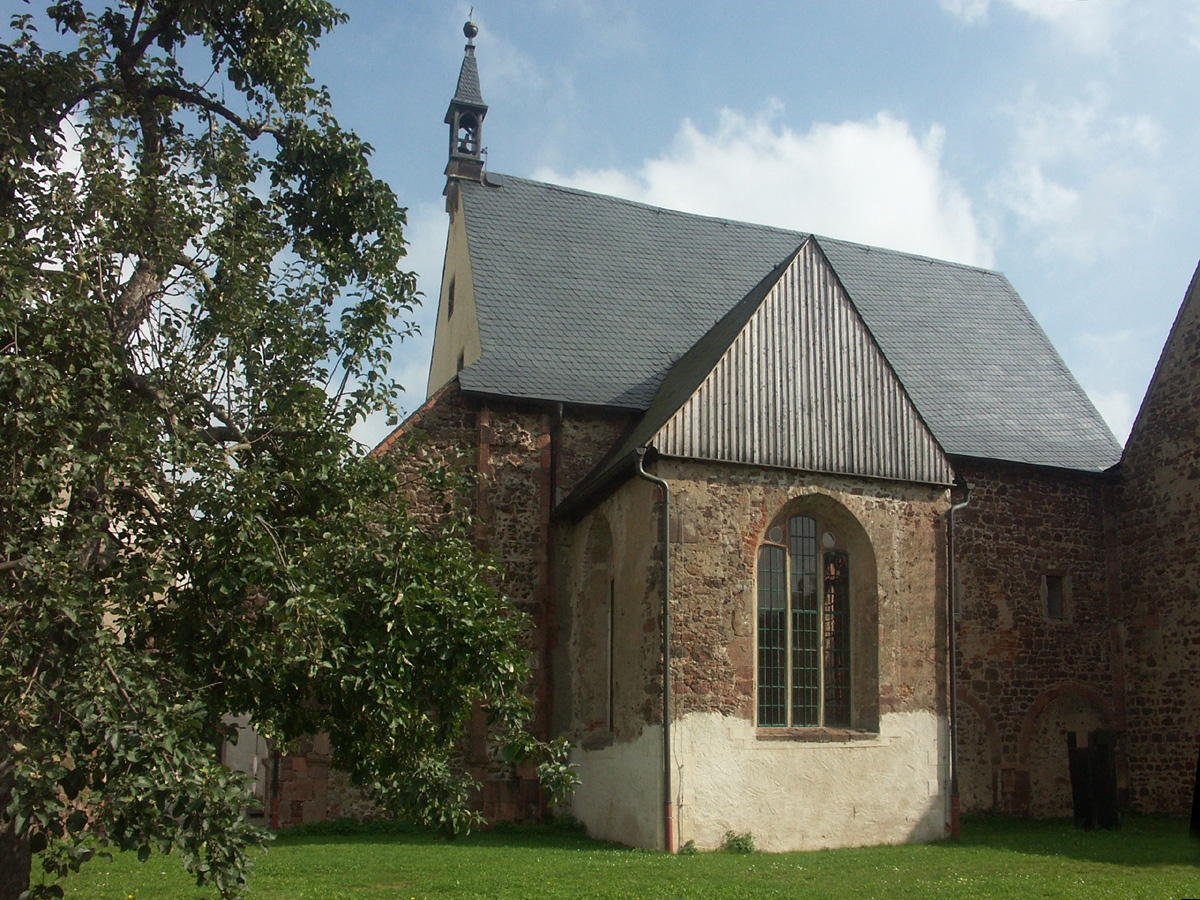
Manor chapel, western side

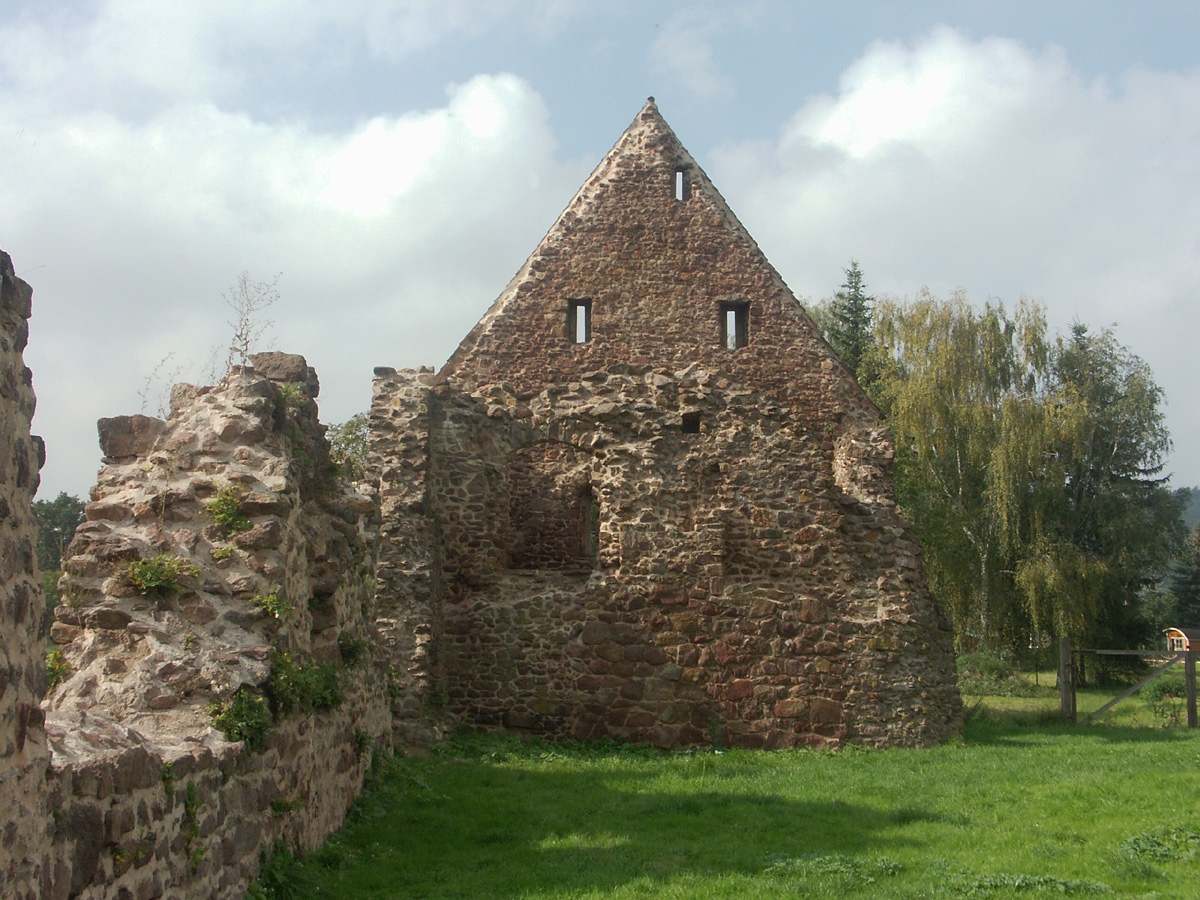
Ruins of former malt house

Of the medieval buildings, the eastern parts of the church, the chapter house, the infirmarium, the abbot's residence and several auxiliary buildings have survived.

The church was a pillared basilica with a nave and two aisles and a transept. An outer wall of an aisle, the choir and three sidechapels are still extant. Using medieval parts (pillars, windows, and vaults), a smaller evangelical church was built in the choir to serve the manor with an altar on its western side. From the courtyard it cannot be recognised as a church.

The chapter house with a length of 70 m is witness to the generous planning of the builders and founders who envisaged a numerous convent. Its room layout was changed several times according to the varying uses after the dissolution of the monastery. It contained the assembly room on the ground floor, while the upper floor served as the dormitorium. Toilets, the so-called necessarium, were located at its southern end. A sewer branching off the Mulde river flowed through this part of the building which was only accessible from the inside of the dormitorium. Remainders of the lower part of the necessarium can still be viewed.

The two-storied abbot's residence was built around 1400 as evidenced by dendrochronological studies of the roof timbers. Its outward appearance is determined by alterations performed in the 16th and 17th century, while the portal with its pointed arch dates back into the Middle Ages.

The infirmarium (sick quarters) was located behind the abbot's residence. The eastern part of the ward and the chapel have been preserved unlike the infirmaries and necessaries of other former monasteries.

Ruins of the so-called brewery or malt house are found west of the former monastic quarters. Here the lay brothers worked, guests were received, and travellers were accommodated. The location of the former cloister is traced by flower beds. A 10 m long fragment of the wall that once surrounded the entire premises has been preserved between chapter house and brewery.

The outbuildings dating from the time when the estate was operated as a manor now house the souvenir shop, a demonstration workshop and rooms with special offers for children. Behind them, a herb garden has been planted in the grounds leading towards the Mulde river.

== Bibliography ==
- Battré, Herta (1951). Beiträge zur Geschichte des Klosters Buch (PDF). Universität Leipzig. (doctoral thesis)
- Landesamt für Denkmalpflege Sachsen, ed. (2006). Das Zisterzienserkloster Buch. Arbeitsbericht zur Bauforschung. Arbeitsheft des Landesamt für Denkmalpflege Sachsen. Vol. 9. Beucha: Sax-Verlag. ISBN 978-3-934544-85-7.
- Carl Wilhelm Hingst (1865). "Das Kloster Buch in seinem Ursprunge, Wachsthume und Glanze". Mittheilungen des königlich sächsischen Vereins für Erforschung und Erhaltung vaterländischer Geschichts- und Kunstdenkmale (14). Dresden: 64–90.
- Leisniger Geschichts- und Heimatverein e.V., Förderverein Kloster Buch e.V., ed. (2003). Ehemaliges Zisterzienserkloster Buch. Leisnig.
- Gentzsch, Friedrich (2014). Kloster Buch - Eine Annäherung an seine Geschichte anhand der Urkunden. Leipzig and Beucha: Sax-Verlag. ISBN 978-3-86729-131-6.
