= Graukloster (Schleswig) =

Monastery in Schleswig

Coordinates: 54.5145°N 9.5720°E

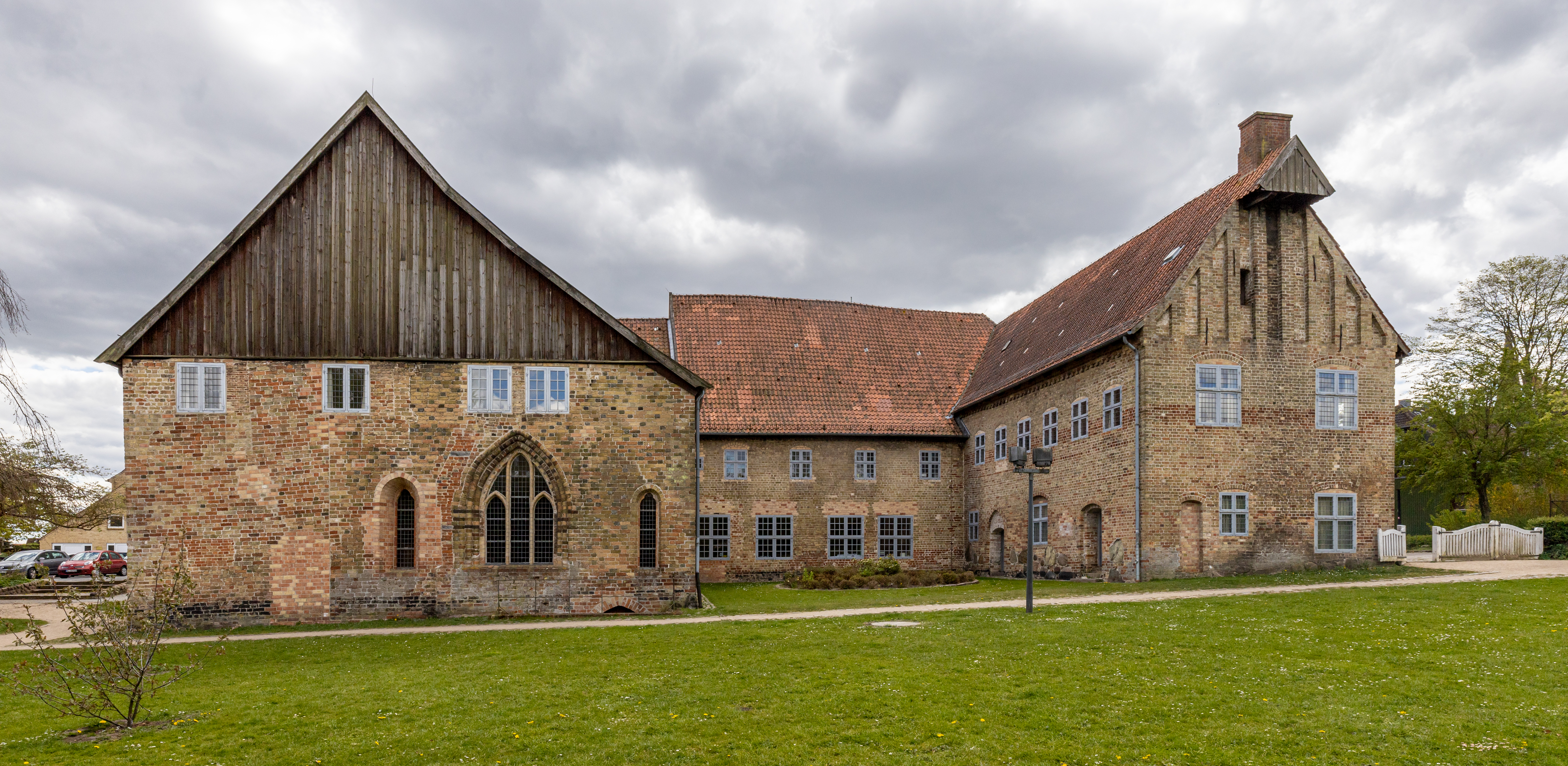
Remains of the former Graukloster on the back of today's town hall

The Graukloster, also known as Kloster St. Paul or Kloster St. Paulus, is a former Franciscan monastery located in Schleswig, Germany. It is named after the gray color of the Franciscan uniform (religious habit). Following the dissolution of the monastery in 1528/29, the convent buildings were transformed into a shelter for the poor (Armenstift), while the church came under the ownership of the town and was converted into a town hall. The present-day classicistic town hall was built on the foundation walls in 1794/95. Some sections of the medieval convent buildings still remain intact and have been utilized by the city administration since the 1980s.

== History ==
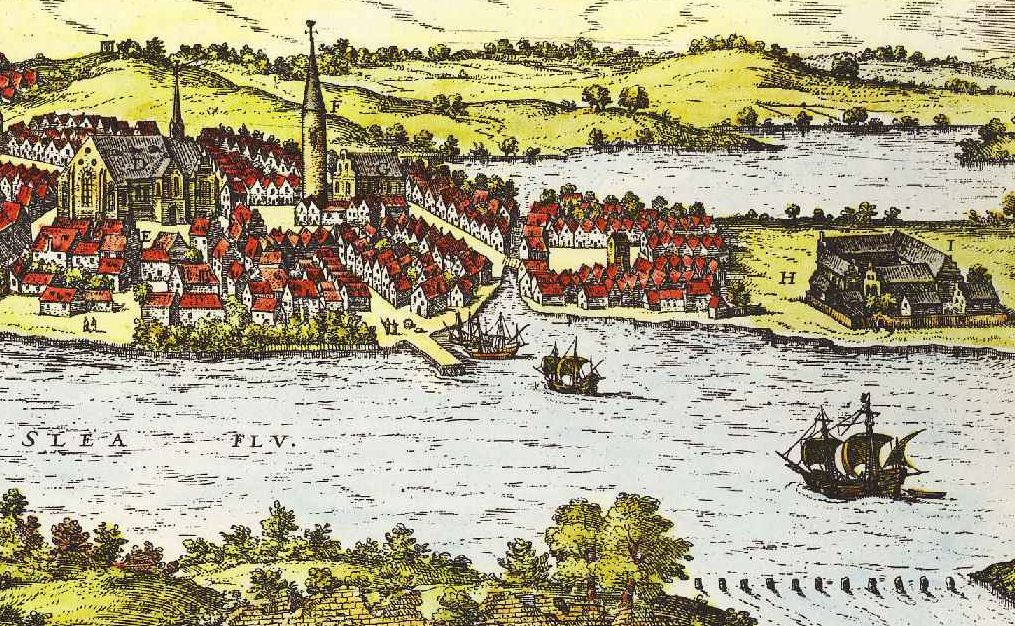
Historical view of Schleswig by Frans Hogenberg from Georg Braun's Civitates Orbis Terrarum (around 1600), in the center, on the market square, on the right, the tower of the former Trinity Church (until 1531, F), next to it (G) the church of the Graukloster St . Paul

The monastery was founded in 1234 under the patronage of St. Paul during the reign of Duke Abel, later King of Denmark. Abel left the site of a former Danish royal court for the friars of the Franciscan order, founded in 1210. This court became redundant with the construction of Jürgensburg Castle on Gull Island, near the city center and St. Peter's Cathedral. Alongside the monasteries in Viborg and Ribe, it stands as one of the earliest Franciscan monasteries in Danish territory. Initially, St. Paul belonged to the Saxon Franciscan Province (Saxonia) within the Franciscan Order. However, in 1239, it became part of the Ribe Custody of the Order's Dacia Province (Denmark) due to the rapid expansion of the Order. Ecclesiastically, the monastery was subordinate to the bishopric of Schleswig and the archbishopric of Lund, while its secular affairs were dependent on the duchy of Schleswig. The construction of the monastery church was completed in 1240.

At times, St. Paul's was one of the largest Franciscan monasteries in the Kingdom of Denmark. Three times - in 1292, 1316, and 1392 - religious chapters of the Dacia Province were held here.

At the end of the 15th century, the few remaining friars, two priests, and one lay brother of St. Paul joined the Observance movement in the Franciscan Order at the behest of Duke Frederick I. In 1499, Friedrich obtained permission from Pope Alexander VI to initiate reforms within the monastery. Subsequently, in 1516, Frederick I merged St. Paul with other Franciscan monasteries including Lunden, St. Mary in Kiel, and the Husum monastery. This merger gave rise to the Custody of Holstein, which became part of the religious province of Saxonia in 1520.

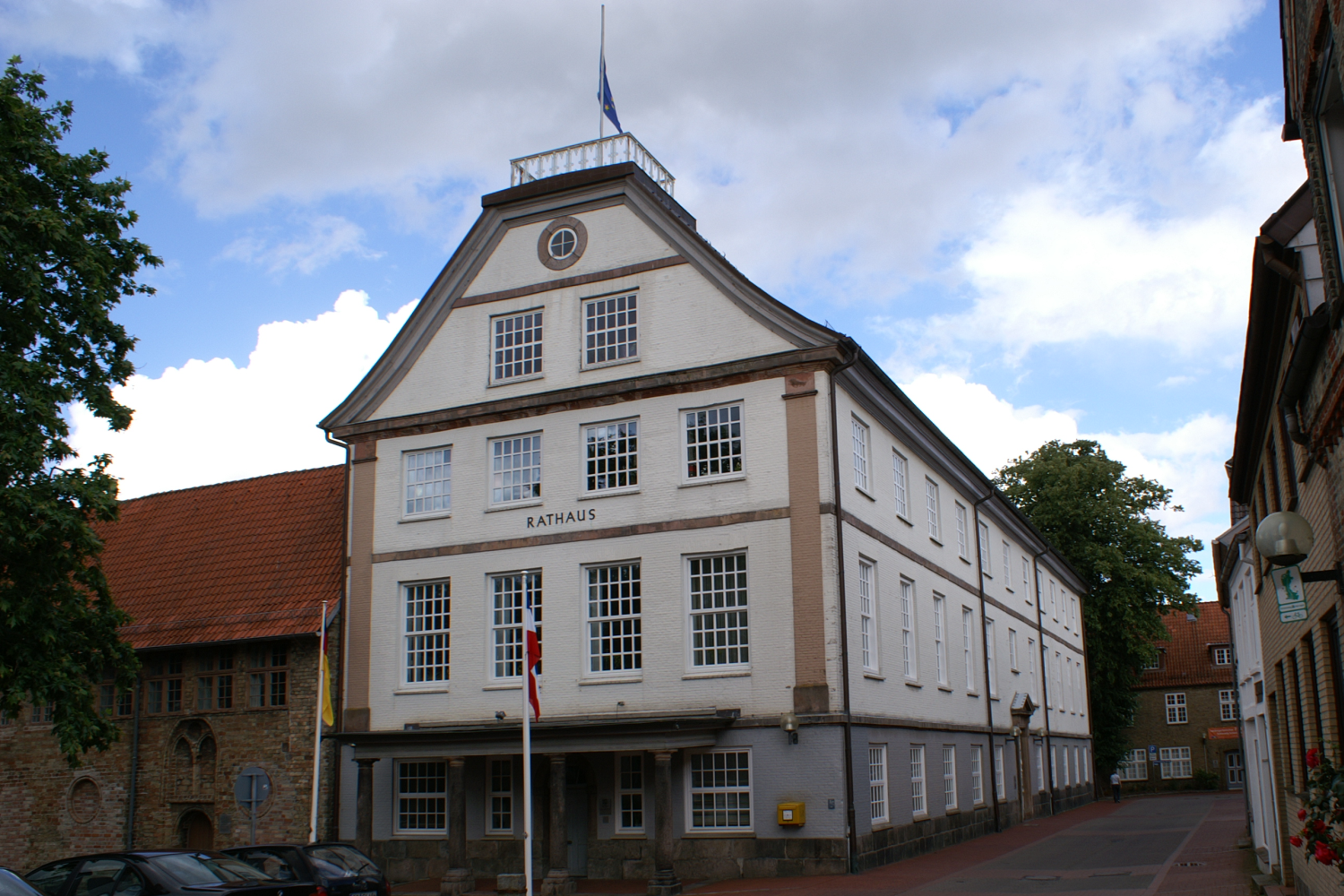
Schleswig town hall and parts of the former enclosure of St. Paul

During the Reformation - also by Frederick I - the monastery was dissolved. From 1528, the Franciscans experienced violent interventions in their convent life; they were forbidden to celebrate Holy Mass. In 1530 the friars were expelled from the monastery. At the same time, the Dominican Monastery of St. Mary Magdalene was also revoked.

In 1529, Christian III, son of Frederick and future King of Denmark, gathered 400 secular and spiritual dignitaries at St. Paul. This significant meeting played a pivotal role in shaping the religious landscape of both the Duchy of Schleswig and the Kingdom of Denmark. Christian III, who had previously encountered Martin Luther at the Diet of Worms in 1521, had already joined the Reformation movement with the part of the Duchy of Schleswig that was under his jurisdiction.

The church of St. Paul became the property of the town after the abolition of the monastery and was converted into a town hall. In 1793, the building was demolished due to dilapidation and in 1794/95 the present classicist town hall was built. The remaining buildings and lands were passed to a shelter house, which provided accommodation for up to 22 impoverished citizens until 1980. Today, parts of the town administration are located in the buildings. It is open to the public on guided tours and is occasionally used for arts and crafts markets.

== Monastery complex and inventory ==
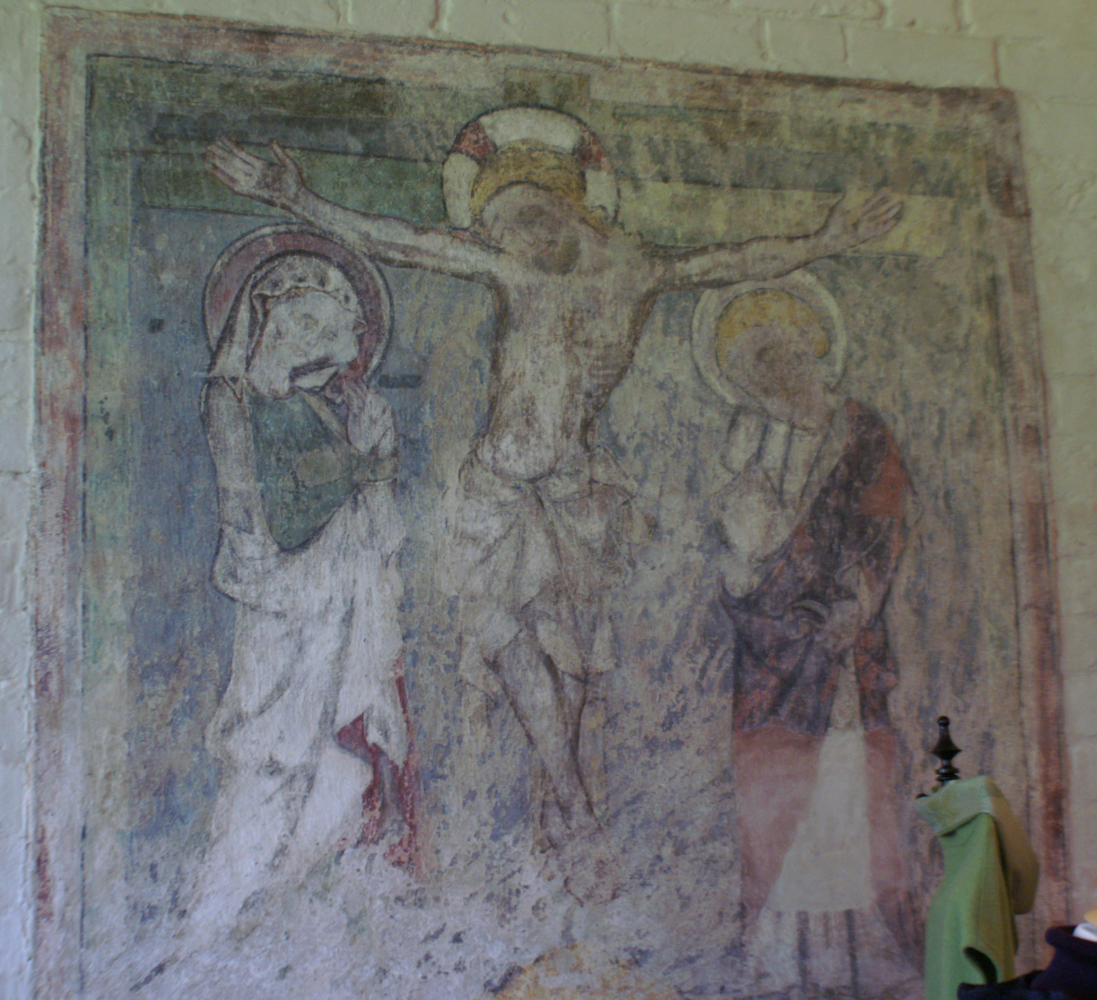
Wall painting (around 1280) on the east wall of the Gothic hall

The current complex, comprising the town hall and the former monastery, provides a glimpse into the scale and layout of the original monastery complex. The architectural footprint of the town hall closely resembles the former church of St. Paul, which had a single-nave hall church featuring a flat polygonal apse. To further capture the essence of the original design, an engraving by Frans Hogenberger from approximately 1600 offers an additional visual representation.

Much more is contained by the former cloister. It consists of a three-winged building that surrounds a central courtyard. The eastern and western wings extend further to the north, creating a second courtyard that opens towards the north when combined with the north wing. Over time, certain sections of the original building were built after the Reformation and remained hidden until restoration work took place between 1980 and 1984. The history of the building is evident in the exposed sections of the foundations and the unplastered exterior walls, showcasing the various stages of construction and modifications that have occurred over the years.

An important feature to highlight is the Gothic hall, situated in the northern extension of the east wing. This hall contains wall paintings and exhibits the pointed arches on its door and window openings, reminiscent of the Gothic period. Notably, the oldest wall painting is a crucifixion scene on the east wall, dating back to 1280. The paintings on the north and west walls can be traced back to the mid-14th century. Beneath the Gothic hall, remnants of a hypocaust, and a heating system can be found. Adjacent to the hall, a room was built in the mid-15th century, and is believed to have served as a kitchen during that period.
