= Osterhausen =

- Stadtteil of Eisleben
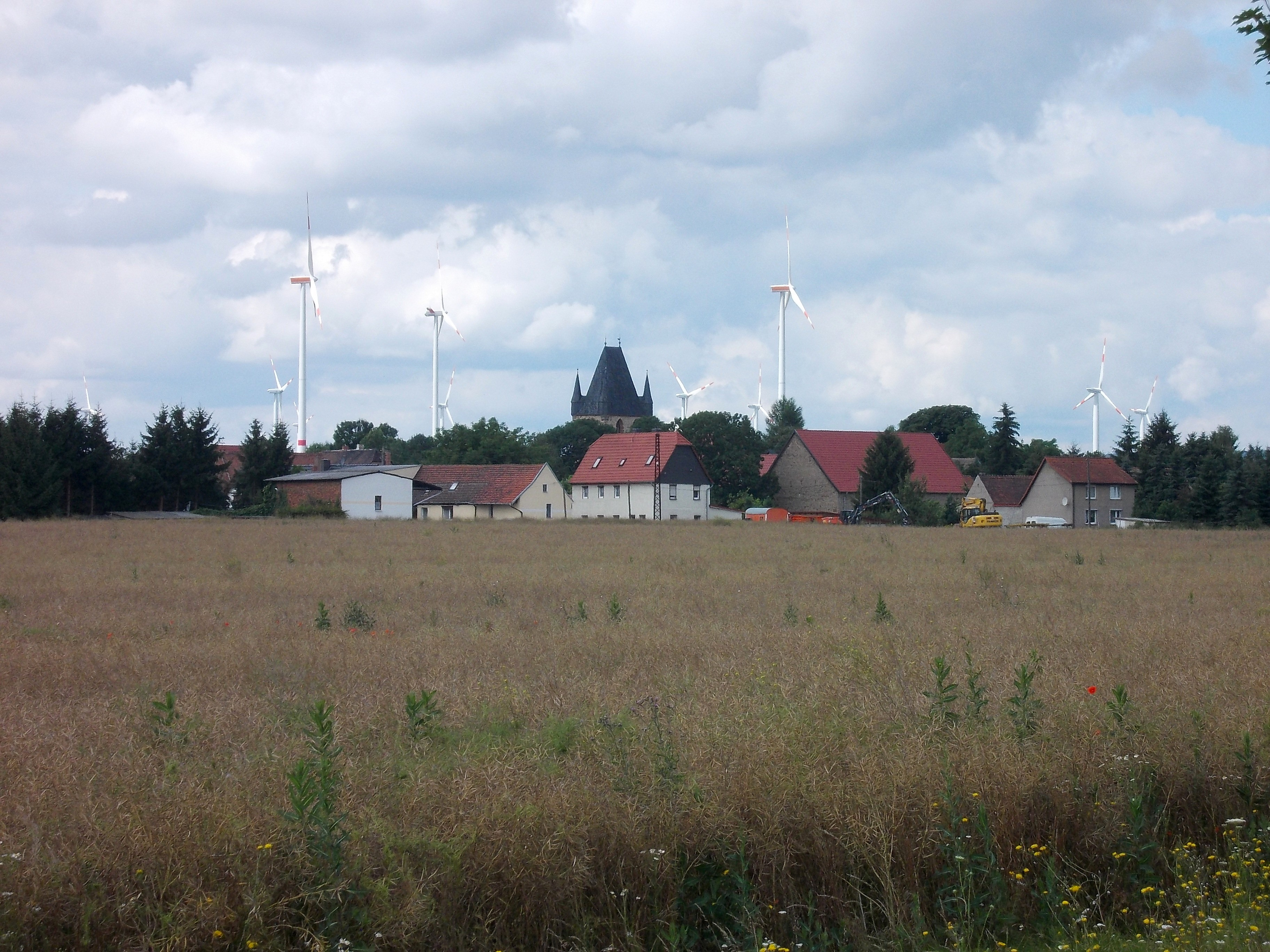
- Osterhausen from the south-east
- Interactive map of Osterhausen
- Location within Germany Location within Saxony-Anhalt
- Coordinates: 51°27′N 11°30′E
- Country: Germany
- State: Saxony-Anhalt
- District: Mansfeld-Südharz
- Town: Eisleben

Area
  - Total: 16.51 km^{2} (6.37 sq mi)
- Elevation: 165 m (541 ft)

Population (2006-12-31)
  - Total: 1,052
  - Density: 63.72/km^{2} (165.0/sq mi)
- Time zone: UTC+01:00 (CET)
  - Summer (DST): UTC+02:00 (CEST)
- Postal codes: 06295
- Dialling codes: 034776
- Vehicle registration: ML

Osterhausen is a village and a former municipality in the Mansfeld-Südharz district, in Saxony-Anhalt, Germany. Since 1 January 2009, it is part of the town Eisleben.
