= Jacob Wiener =

Belgian medallist (1815–1899)

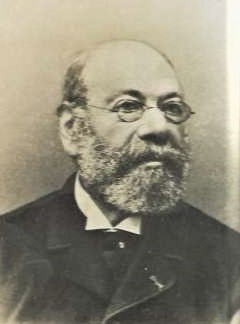
Jacob Wiener (date unknown)

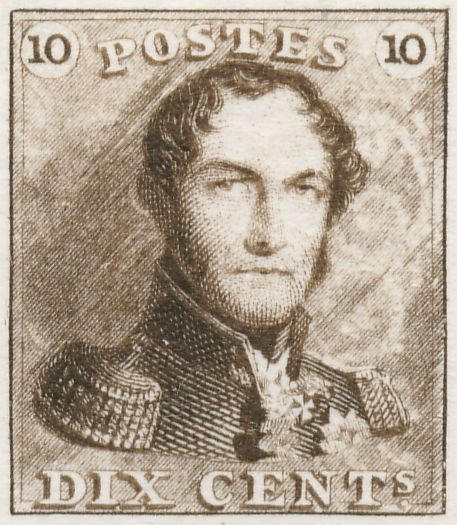
The first Belgian postage stamp, featuring a portrait of King Leopold I

Jacob Wiener, or Jacques Wiener (27 February 1815, Hoerstgen – 3 November 1899, Brussels) was a Belgian medallist. He is best known for helping to create the first Belgian postage stamps, issued in 1849.

== Biography ==
He was the eldest of ten children born to the merchant Marcus Mayer (1794-?) and Hanna Baruch (1791-?), the daughter of an engraver. They adopted the name "Wiener" (Viennese) in 1808, when Jews were first given the right to have fixed family names. He was only two when they moved to Venlo, in the Netherlands. At the age of thirteen, he went to Aachen to learn drawing and engraving from his uncle, Loeb Baruch (1789-1863).

After some time in Paris to complete his training, he settled in Brussels in 1839 and became a naturalized Belgian citizen. In 1845, he married Annette Levy Newton. They had four children. Their son, Samson, was a notable lawyer and politician.

His work on monuments, and for various cathedrals throughout Europe, made his reputation grow until, in 1849, he was commissioned to help create the first set of Belgian postage stamps (known as Epaulettes). They featured a portrait of King Leopold I, drawn by Charles Baugniet and engraved by John Henry Robinson. In addition to producing the final design, he also served as a consultant on their manufacture and the means of preventing forgeries.

He often worked together with his brothers, Léopold and Charles, who were also engravers and medallists.

Around 1870, his constant use of a magnifying glass began to affect his eyesight. By 1872, he had gone blind. His sight was partially restored through cataract surgery but, in consideration of a possible relapse, he was forced to give up his trade in 1874. He spent his last twenty-five years doing charitable and organizational work for the Jewish community of Belgium.

He was a Knight in the Order of Leopold, Engraver to the King, and President of the Consistoire central israélite de Belgique. He is interred at the Cimetière d'Ixelles
