= Polenius =

Polenius is the name of:

- Robert Pullen (c. 1080–c. 1146), also known as Polenius, English theologian and Catholic cardinal
- an abbot (fl. 1636–1664) of Kamp Abbey, a German Cistercian monastery
