= Postage stamps and postal history of Belgium =

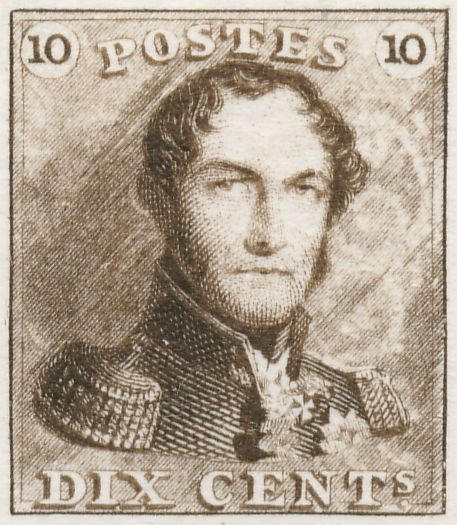
The first Belgian stamp, known as "Epaulettes", issued in 1849

Belgium began using national postage stamps on 8 July 1849, when two imperforate stamps, a 10c. brown and 20c. blue, collectively known as Epaulettes, were introduced. A few months later a 40c. red stamp with a new design was issued, for postage to foreign destinations. In 1850 two new stamps of 10c. and 20c. were issued.

Initially, all Belgian stamps were issued with the French name "Belgique" only, as the French was the original language of government. Under the government of Auguste Beernaert, however, stamps began to be issued with the Dutch language "België" too from 1889.

Belgian stamps are rarely issued with German text ("Belgien") too, including overprinted German Germania stamps during World War I.

== Gallery ==
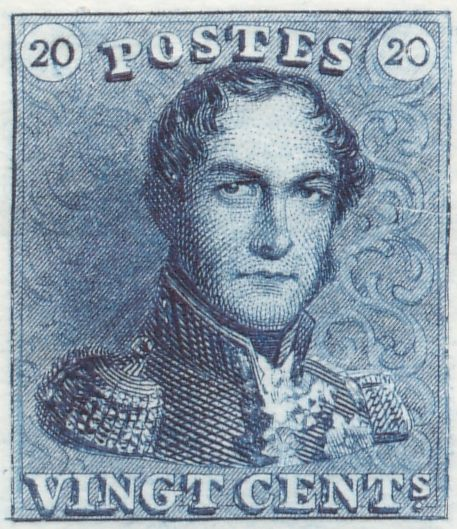
20 centimes Epaulettes stamp of Leopold I, 1849

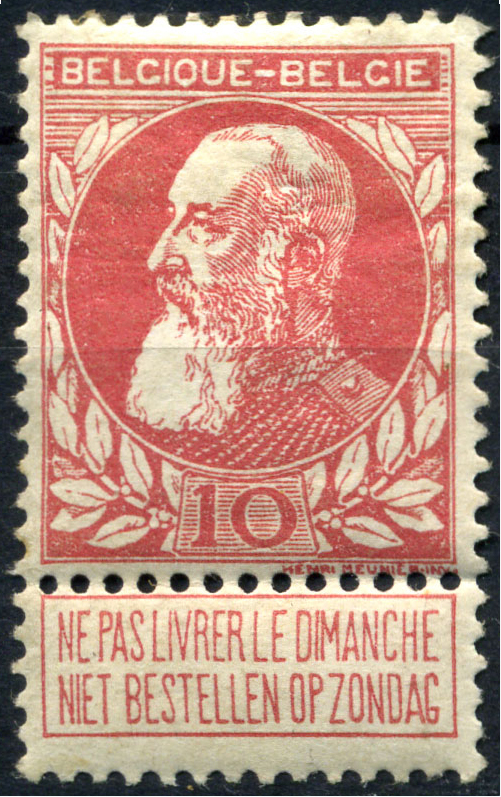
Bilingual 10 centimes stamp depicting Leopold II, 1905

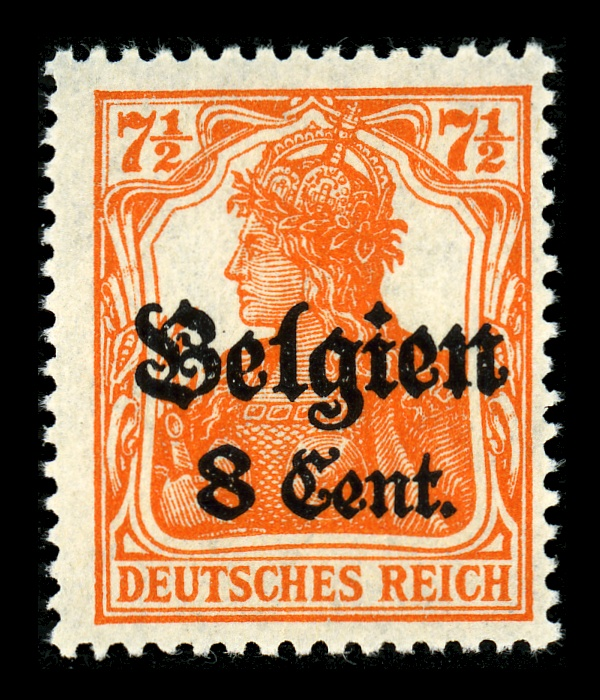
German World War I occupation stamp for Belgium, 1914–1918

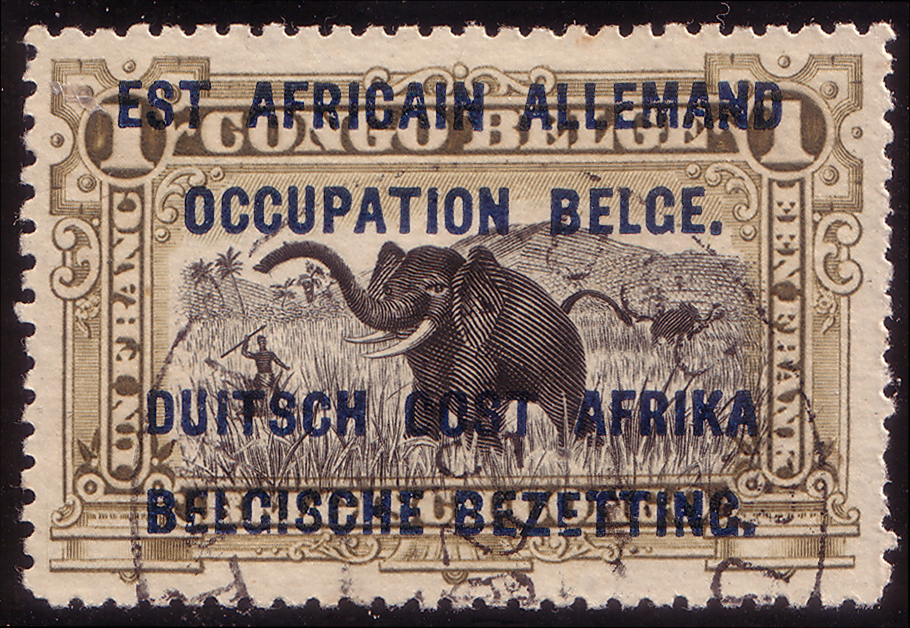
Belgian occupation of German East Africa, 1916

== See also ==
- Inverted Dendermonde
- Jean-Baptiste Moens
- Postage stamps and postal history of Ruanda-Urundi
