= Charles Baugniet =

Belgian painter and lithographer (1814–1886)

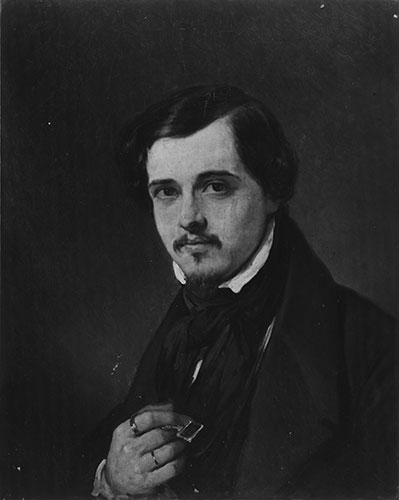
- Portrait by Louis Gallait (1837)
- Born: 27 February 1814; Brussels, United Netherlands (modern-day Belgium)
- Died: 5 July 1886 (aged 72); Sèvres, France
- Education: Académie Royale des Beaux-Arts
- Known for: Lithography and aquarelle

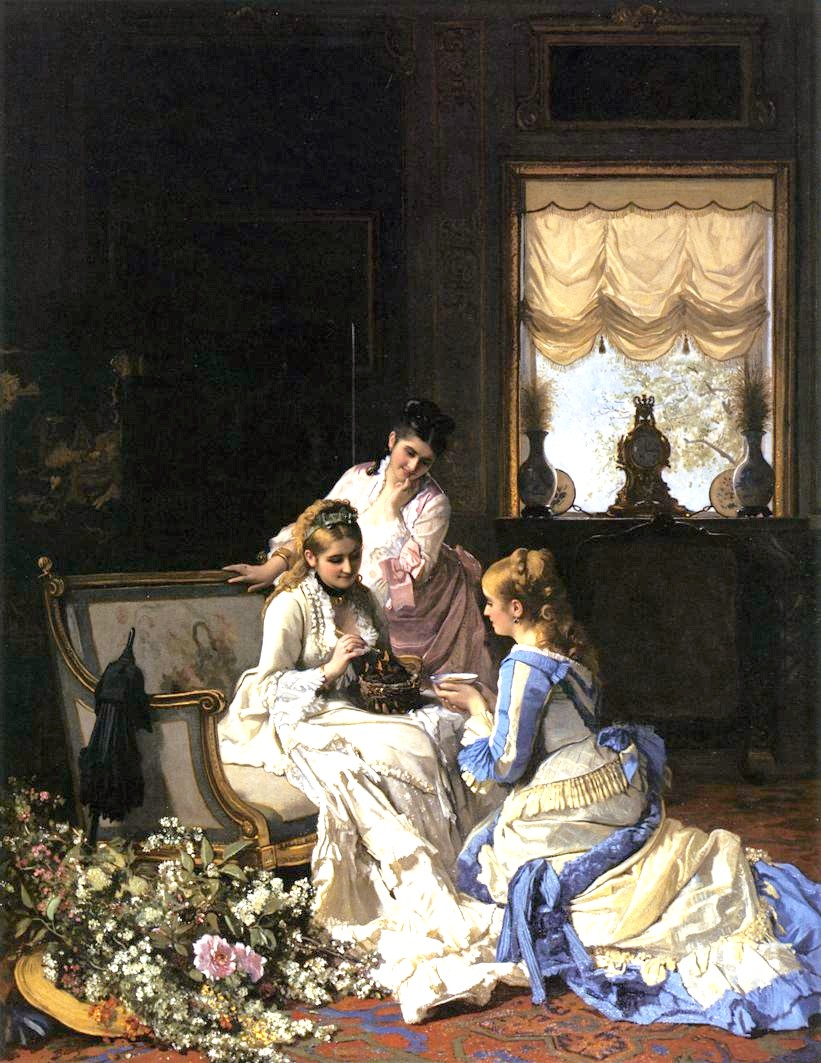
Spring's New Arrivals

Charles-Louis Baugniet (French pronunciation: [ʃaʁl lwi boɲɛ]; 27 February 1814 – 5 July 1886) was a Belgian painter, lithographer and aquarellist. His name remains attached to the lithographing of portraits of famous and lesser-known figures from Belgium, France and England. They are politicians, senior officials, prominent clergy, both from the Roman Catholic and Anglican Church, industrialists, professors, artists, musicians, actors, and people from the vaudeville world.

== Biography ==
He was born in Brussels and attended the Académie Royale des Beaux-Arts in Brussels during 1827–29, where he studied under Joseph Paelinck and Florent Willems. His first attempts lithography date from 1827, and his reputation grew steadily with the appearance of his first portraits in the magazine L'Artiste in 1833.

He collaborated with Louis Huard from 1835 until 1842 in producing a series of portraits of the Belgian House of Representatives. Louis Huard finished only 6 portraits, Baugniet doing the remainder. This was followed in 1836 by a series of 30 portraits of contemporary artists—"Les Artistes Contemporains". Included were portraits of Louis Jéhotte, Louis Gallait, Nicaise De Keyser, Jean-Baptiste Madou, Eugène Simonis, Charles-Louis Verboeckhoven, Horace Vernet, Paul Delaroche and Hippolyte Bellangé.

He was commissioned to do portraits of the Belgian royal family, and this led to his appointment as court painter in 1841. In 1843 he moved to London where he became a leading society portrait painter, creating a portrait of Prince Albert in 1851. Later he often returned to London to do portraits of celebrities such as Charles Dickens and the French composer Hector Berlioz. Baugniet also designed the first Belgian postage stamp (the so-called Epaulettes type) brought into circulation on 1 July 1849. The stamp depicted Leopold I of Belgium after a painting by Liévin De Winne.

Baugniet settled in Paris in 1860. Almost overnight the invention and development of photography strangled the traditional market of lithographic portraits, forcing many of Baugniet's colleagues to become professional photographers. Baugniet however concentrated on producing paintings and portraits which displayed the studied elegance of the Second French Empire, a genre that enjoyed great popularity. He died in Sèvres in 1886.

== Honours ==
- Knight in the Order of Christ.
- Knight in the Saxe-Ernestine House Order.
- Knight in the Order of Isabella the Catholic.

== Bibliography ==
- Thieme-Becker, Allgemeines Lexikon der Bildenden Künstler von der Antike bis zur Gegenwart, vol. 3, Leipzig, 1909, p. 74-75.
- Benezit E., Dictionnaire critique et documentaire des peintres, sculpteurs, dessinateurs et graveurs, Paris, Librairie Gründ, 1976, tome I, p. 525.
- Rouir Eugène, 150 ans de gravure en Belgique, Bruxelles, C.G.E.R./Meddens, 1980, p. 8.
- Berko P. & V., Dictionnaire des peintres belges nés entre 1750 & 1875, Bruxelles, Laconti, 1981, p. 34.
- Jacobs Alain, Baugniet, dans Le Dictionnaire des Peintres belges du XIVe siècle à nos jours depuis les premiers maîtres des anciens Pays-bas méridionaux et de la Principauté de Liège jusqu'aux artistes contemporains, Bruxelles, La Renaissance du Livre, 1995, p. 56. (le Dictionnaire des Peintres belges sur internet : site de l'IRPA : Balat)
