= Sibculo Abbey =

Cistercian abbey in Overijssel, Netherlands

Coordinates: 52°28′53″N 6°38′26″E

Sibculo Abbey (Dutch: Klooster Sibculo), also called Groot Galilea (Galilea Major), was a Cistercian abbey founded in 1403 by followers of the Modern Devotion movement and dissolved in 1579 during the Protestant Reformation of the Netherlands. Its remains are near the village of Sibculo in the municipality of Hardenberg in Overijssel.

== Foundation ==
After the Battle of Ane in 1227, it was one of the terms of the Bishopric of Utrecht that on the spot where Bishop Otto of Lippe was killed, as a sign of reconciliation, a nunnery for twenty-five nuns should be built. After that site proved to be too marshy, in 1253 Zybbekeloe was selected as a possible alternative location. It was not however until 1403 that a group of followers of the Modern Devotion, men rather than women, under the leadership of Johan Clemme, a priest from Hesse, fought their way through the surrounding bog onto the sand ridge in the peat under very difficult conditions to begin the construction of a viable community.

In 1406 the chapel was dedicated and in 1412 the new community affiliated itself, as a daughter house of Kamp Abbey in Westphalia (of the filiation of Morimond), to the successful Cistercian Order, which had a long tradition of establishing monasteries in remote places and carrying out land reclamation and clearance projects, and thus had valuable knowledge and experience to offer.

== Growth and prosperity ==
The monastery flourished greatly, bringing new spiritual inspiration into the order and also achieving economic success. Under Prior Gerlachus van Kranenborg the church was completed, which attracted more possessions for the monastery.

In 1480 the abbey owned 51 estates, of which three were worked in demesne by lay brothers, while the rest were leased out. At this time the community numbered 80 monks and 110 lay brothers. The monastery stood at the head of the Colligatie van Sibculo, which developed into a congregation within the Cistercian Order of twenty monasteries in what are now the Netherlands, Germany and Belgium.

== War and reformation ==
The 16th century was a period of unrest and insecurity, and thus damaging to the economy. The abbey was repeatedly plundered during the Guelders Wars and severely damaged by fire in 1523.

When in 1579 the Protestant Reformation was introduced in Overijssel, all monasteries were dissolved and their possessions confiscated by the civil authorities. The buildings of Sibculo Abbey fell into decay: building materials were sold or just removed.

== Archaeology ==
The monastery site subsequently lay unused for centuries, prey to the elements. In 1928 the land was owned by the textile manufacturer Ludwig van Heek, who began the excavation of the building remains out of personal interest. He died after about a third of the structures had been uncovered.

Nothing further was done with the site, beneath which are still buried many remains of the former abbey.

When in 2003 the 750th anniversary of Sibculo was celebrated interest was reawakened in its history. A foundation was set up for the safekeeping and making accessible to the public of the abbey remains. Part of the site is designated as "archaeologically valuable", including the channel which surrounded the site and is still easily recognisable.

== Bibliography ==
- G. van Haaff, Groot Galilea in Zybbekeloe, Seinen, De Krim-Hardenberg, 1977
- Rudolf van Dijk, Mariska Vonk, Ton Hendrikman e.a., Moderne Devoten in monnikspij, IJsselacademie-Kampen; Titus Brandsma Instituut-Nijmegen, 2007
