= Mariawald Abbey =

Former Trappist abbey in Germany

Coordinates: 50°37′12″N 06°28′51″E

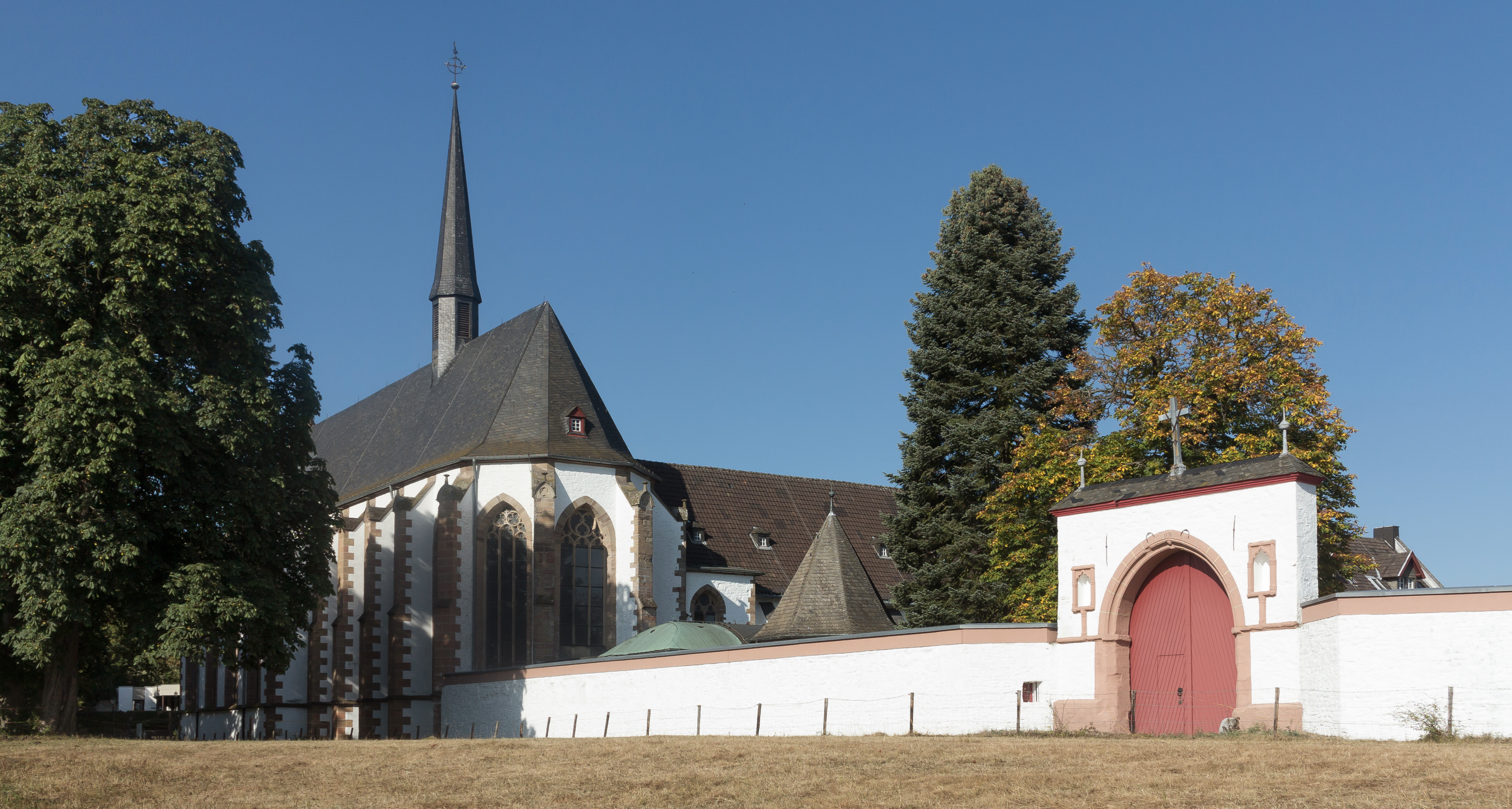
Mariawald, Abbey

Mariawald Abbey (German: Abtei Mariawald) was a monastery of the Trappists (formally known as the Cistercians of the Strict Observance), located above the village of Heimbach, in the district of Düren in the Eifel, in the forests around Kermeter, North Rhine-Westphalia, Germany. In September 2018, the last remaining monks left Mariawald Abbey. The business had been taken over on the basis of a leasehold by "Kloster Mariawald GmbH & Co. KG" since 1 January 2021, while the church buildings remain under direct control of the Diocese of Aachen and the "Kloster Mariawald e.V." as a trustee of the former monastic community. "Abtei Mariawald" continues to be used as a place name even after the closure of the religious community.

== Buildings ==
=== Monastery Courtyard and Surrounding ===
The late gothic gate had been constructed 1538 and is one of the oldest remains of the monastery. The cloister wall was renovated in 2009. The Supplier access with Gate House and garages had been built in the late 20th century. The monastery cemetery is also located in the monastery courtyard, right next to the restaurant wing. The monastery shop is located to the west of the monastery complex. It was built in the 1980s. The car park is also used as starting point für hikes in the Eifel National Park.

A Stations of the Cross trail has been laid out along a hiking path starting above Heimbach main town. From the eighth station onwards, the figures are integrated into the cloister wall. The seventh station was destroyed by a storm in 2018 but was subsequently rebuilt. The lower section of the Stations of the Cross runs through the national park. The use and maintenance of the stations are carried out in accordance with heritage preservation regulations.

The meadows and forests of the monastery precinct are largely managed by the State of North Rhine-Westphalia in conjunction with Eifel National Park. There is also a wayside shrine in the Mariawald Forest; the site is occasionally used for church services.

The Cemetery Heimbach-Mariawald was established while the monastery was being used as a main dressing station. In the 1950s, it was laid out as a war cemetery.

=== Church ===
The first Mariawald Priory Church was built in the first half of the 16th century. November 11, 1511, is considered the day of consecration. But other parts were consecrated 1539. The Trappist Mariawald Priory Church (later Abbey Church) had been built 1874 – 1891, using fundaments of the former church.

The Mariawald Abbey Church is equipped with an organ built in 1978 by the Munich organ builder Rudolf Strohmer,.

The Josephskapelle/St. Joseph's Chapel is integrated into the main building and had been part of the monastic enclosure.

=== Main Building ===
The main building with the cloister, chapter hall, refectory, library, original main gate were laid out in the 16th century. The usage of the rooms and the design changed while the Cistercian periode. The current layout and design of the chapter hall, the refectory, and the house chapel correspond to those of the 18th century. The Trappists added the western cloister, framed by the kitchen, the brewery (later administration wing) and the novitate wing, about 1900. Also the guesthouse with the new main entrance were added by the Trappists at the end of 19th century. The restaurant wing was added after World War II. After closure of the abbey, the restaurant had been enlarged. Also the guesthouse had been expanded for an appartement of the spiritual leader.

=== Oeconomie Building ===
Service buildings were added as early as the Cistercian phase.

While the Trappist periode, the operational building "Ökonomie" with stables, workshops, staff housing, administration were built. The Liqueur Production Wing was added in the later 20th century.

== History ==
=== Cistercians ===
Following Heinrich Fluitter's vision of the Blessed Virgin Mary, a shrine and chapel were built on the site of it, which became a place of pilgrimage, the Marienwallfahrt. For the proper care of the site and the pilgrim's land was given in 1480 to the Cistercians of Bottenbroich Priory, who established a priory here, which they were able to move into on 4 April 1486. The new monastery took its name from the shrine to Mary and from the woods in which it was situated: "Marienwald", or "Mary's wood" (official latin name: Monasterium Nemoris beatae Mariae Virginis).

In 1795 the monastery was closed as a result of the War of the First Coalition and the annexation to the French First Republic, and the monks were expelled. The image of the Virgin was removed to safety in Heimbach. The priory buildings were abandoned and fell into decay.

=== Trappists ===
In 1860, the priory was re-settled by Trappist monks from Oelenberg Abbey in Alsace.

From 1875 to 1887, the monks were exiled because of the Kulturkampf ("Cultural Struggle") policies of the Imperial German government. In 1909, Mariawald was raised from the status of priory to that of an abbey, with the official Latin name "Abbatia B. M. de Nemore".

The monks had to leave the monastery yet again under the Nazi regime during World War II, from 1941 until April 1945, when the surviving members of the community were able to return (Klostersturm, monastery storming). The monastery had to be largely rebuilt because it had been seriously damaged in the war.

After World War II, a brewery was run at the abbey until 1956 when beer production ceased, in part due to the availability of water and brewing ingredients. In 21st century, new beer brands were developed by using original recipes, in cooperation with larger breweries: "Fluitter" and "nemus mariae".

Mariawald Abbey had been the last men's Trappist monastery in Germany.

The monks followed the Rule of St. Benedict and the constitution of the Cistercians of the Strict Observance. Visitors can also stay a few days in the abbey's guesthouse, but the parts of the monastery used by the monastic community cannot be visited.

The abbey runs a tavern and bookshop. It also produces and sells its liqueur. In 1997, it was one of eight Trappist abbeys that founded the International Trappist Association (ITA) to protect the Trappist name from commercial misuse.

=== Old Rite ===
During the tumultuous 1960s, the abbey embraced the current liturgical fashions. However, in 2008 on the Feast of the Presentation of Our Lady in the Temple (21 November), Mariawald Abbey gained from Pope Benedict XVI permission to return to the Old Rite and their original religious discipline: This makes Mariawald unique among Trappist monasteries around the world, in that they adhere to their traditional, strict rule, including the office of the liturgical books in force in the Catholic Church in 1962 (particularly the traditional Latin Mass according to the old Trappist use). 2010, Mariawald attempted to establish an academic program for the training of religious priests, but no course of study was completed.

=== Closure and transformation ===
Josef Vollberg resigned as abbot in October 2016.

By the end of January 2018, it became known that somewhere in the year the abbey would be closed and the monks distributed over other abbeys.

The monastery was officially closed. However, the tavern and bookshop remained open, and liqueur production was still ongoing.

The abbey's motto is Luceat lux vestra ("Let your light shine"), from Matthew 5:16.

In late 2018, the association "Trappistenkonvent Mariawald e.V." was renamed to "Kloster Mariawald e.V.". New members joined this association, and they elected a new executive board.

As of 1 January 2021, Kloster Mariawald GmbH & Co. KG took over the ownership of the land and operational buildings and continued to operate the restaurant, bookstore, liqueur production, and online shipping. The Diocese of Aachen announced, that an attempt is to be made to settle a religious community in Mariawald again, which could then use the premises as tenants.

Since the closure of the monastery in 2018, it has been used as a museum with guided tours.

Mariawald served as a setting for the TV productions "Da hilft nur beten" and the Tatort episode "Schweigen.".

== Abbots ==
- Laurentius Wimmer (1909–1929)
- Stephan Sauer (1929–1939)
- Christophorus Elsen (1947–1961)
- Andreas Schmidt (1961–1966)
- Otto Aßfalg (1967–1980)
- Meinrad Behren (1983–1992)
- Franziskus de Place (1993–1999)
- Bruno Gooskens (1999–2005)
- Josef Vollberg (2006–2016) from 2017 as prior

== Photo gallery ==
Mariawald Abbey - Abtei Mariawald

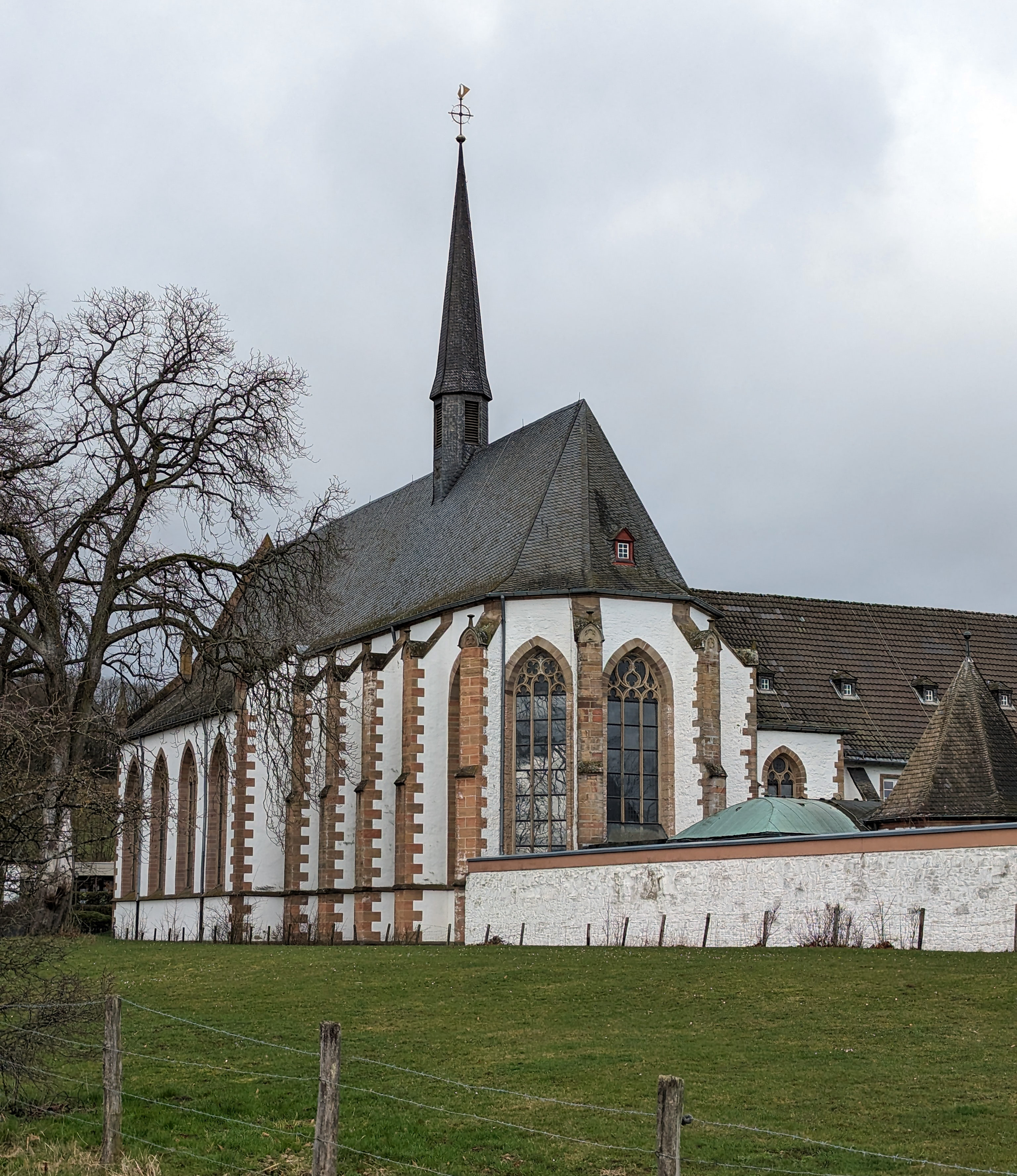

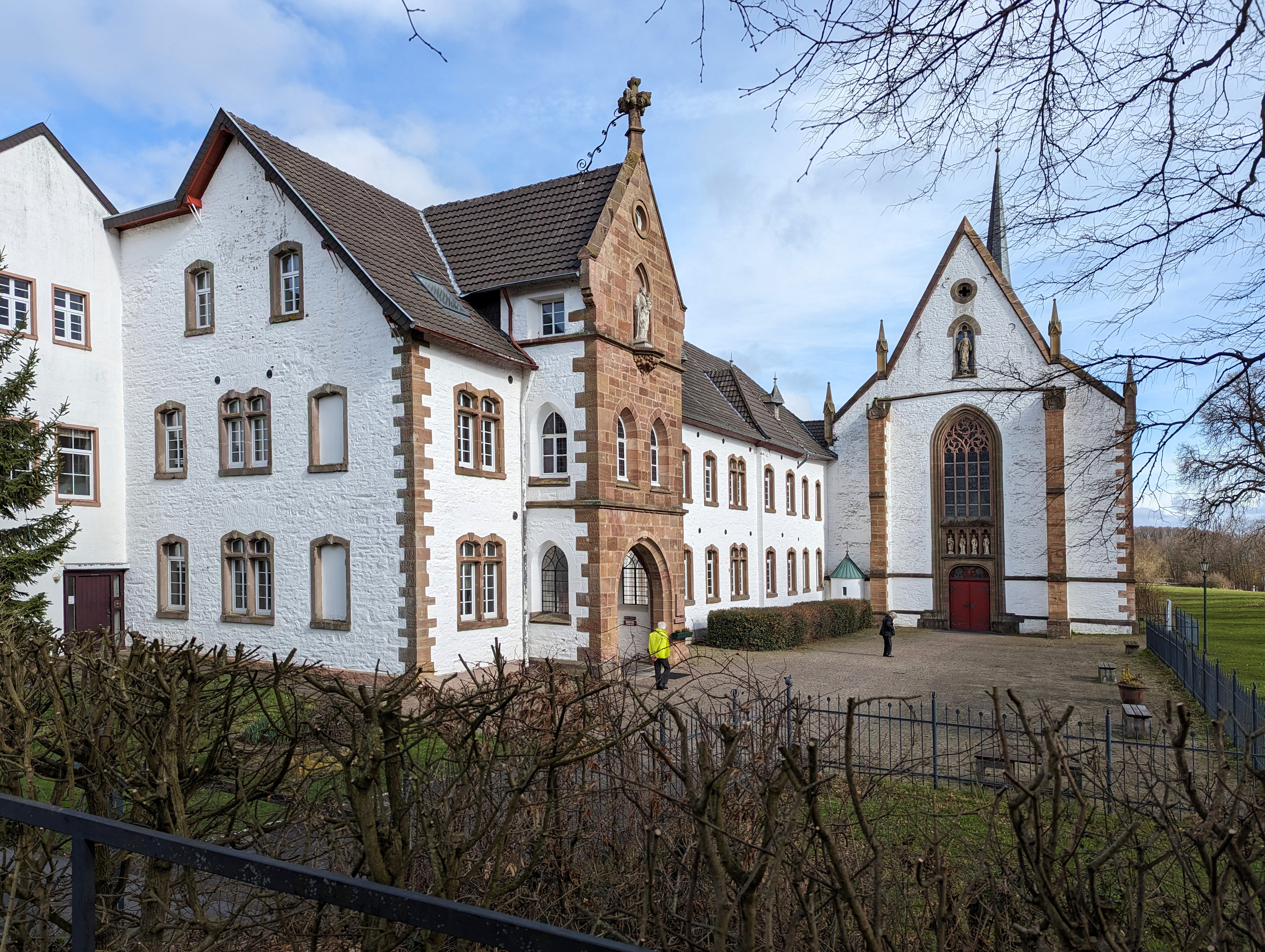

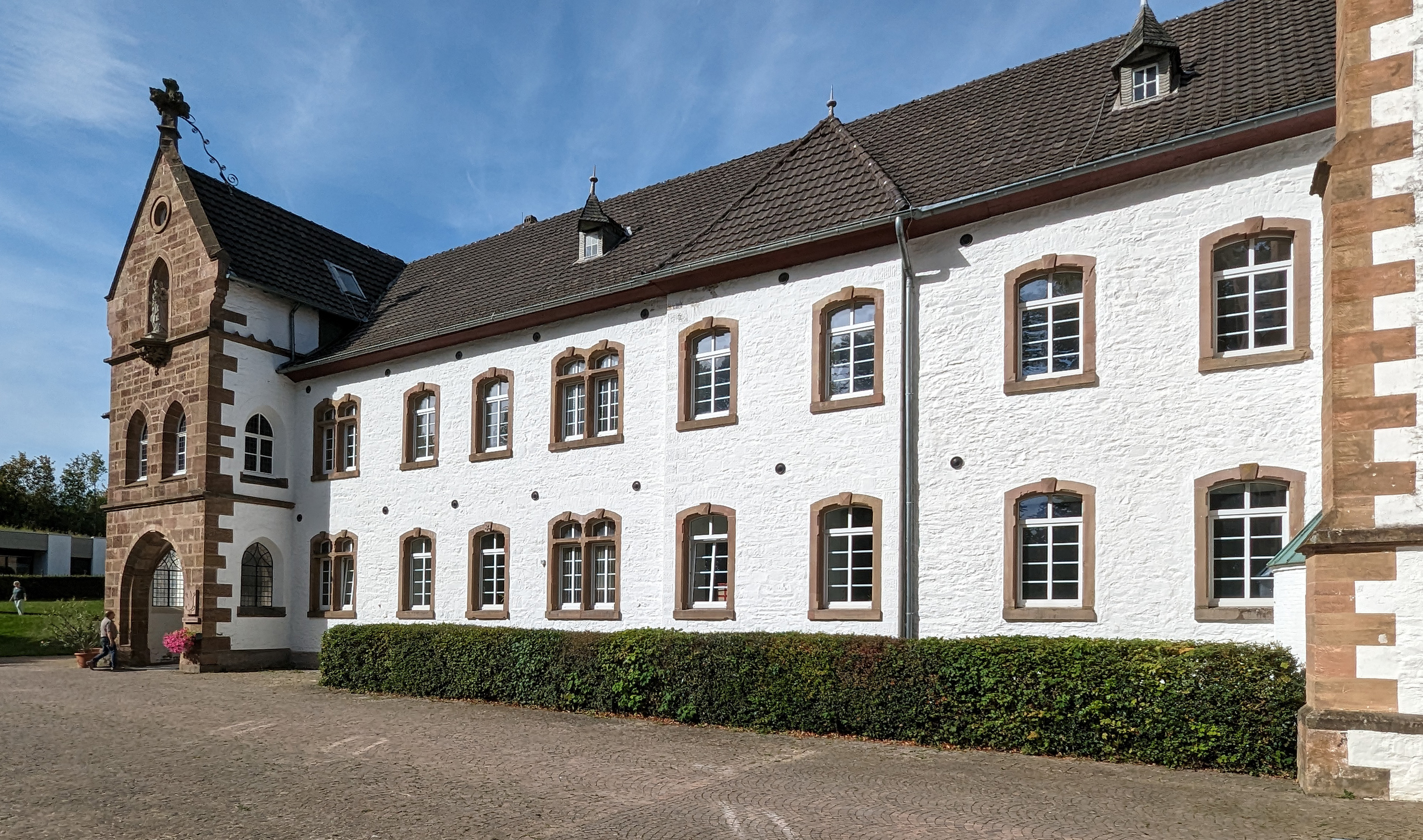

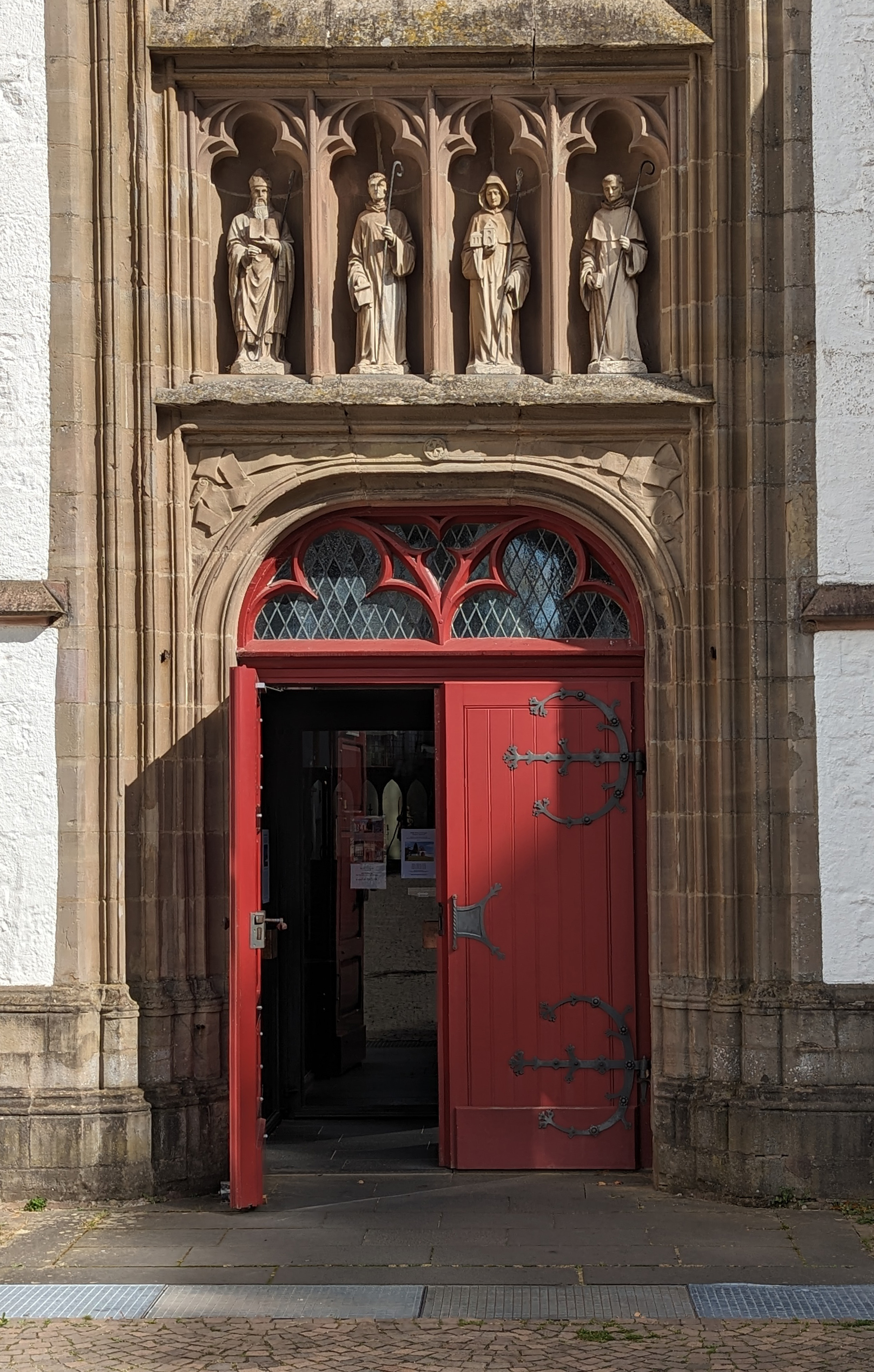

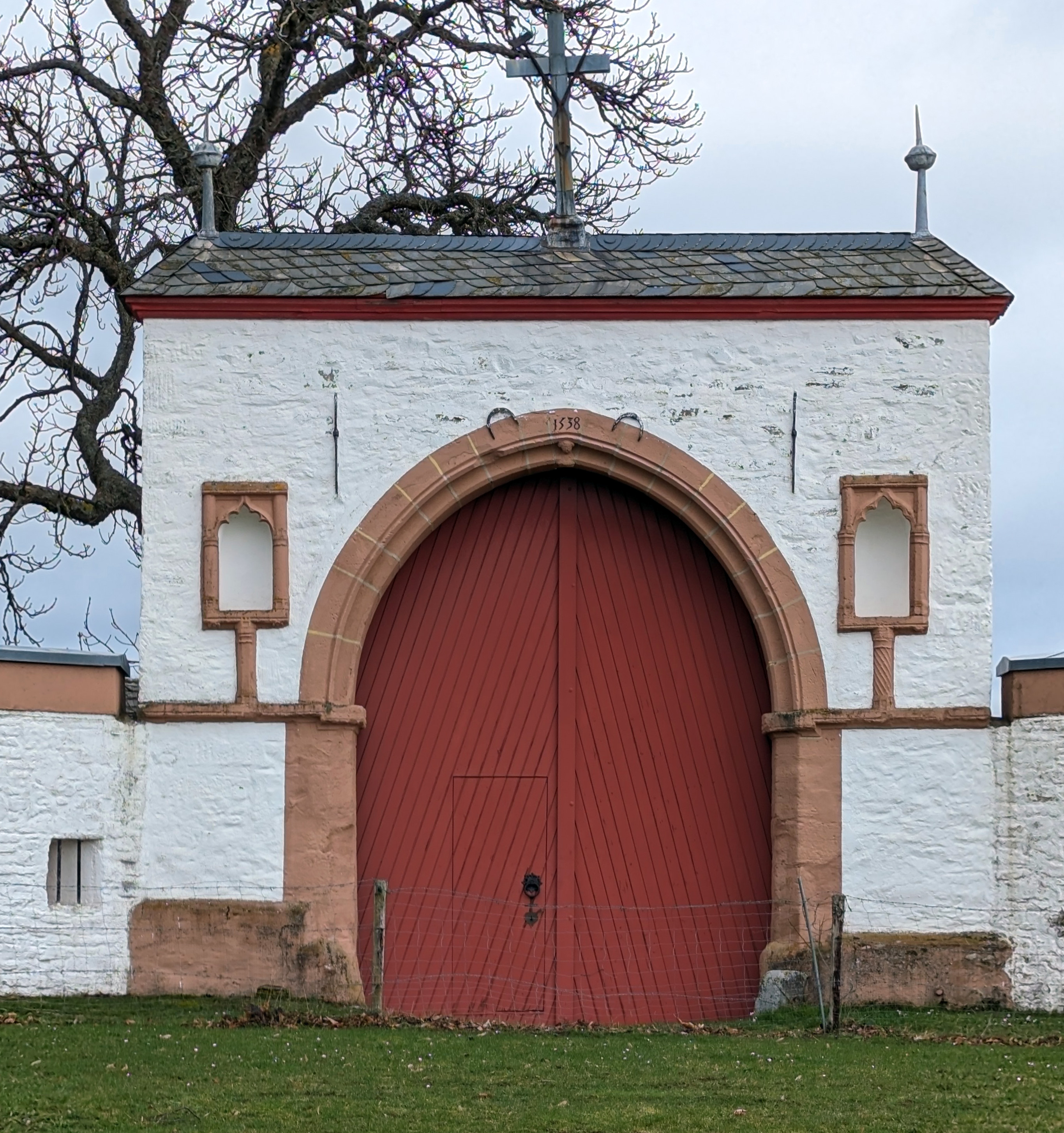

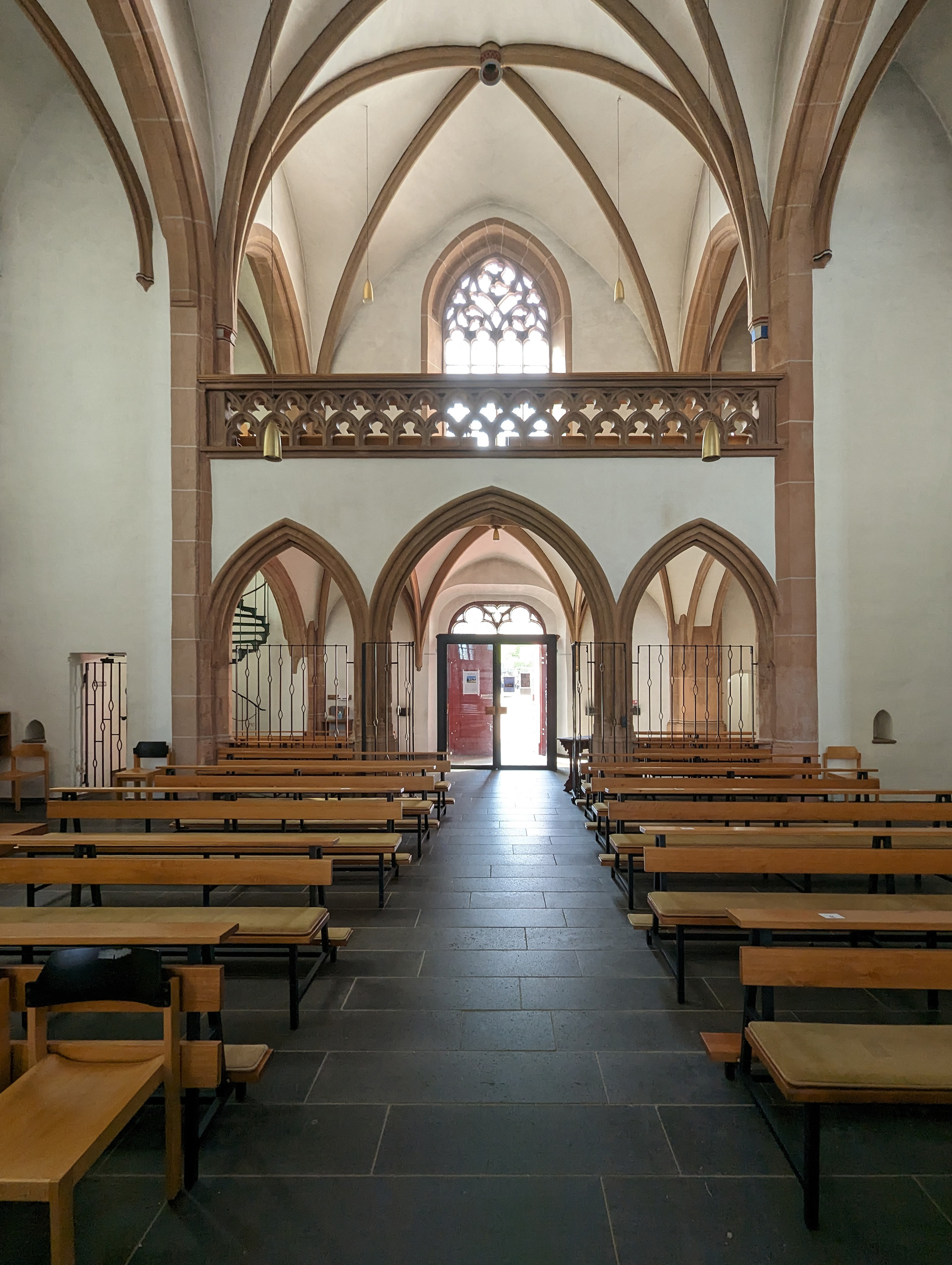

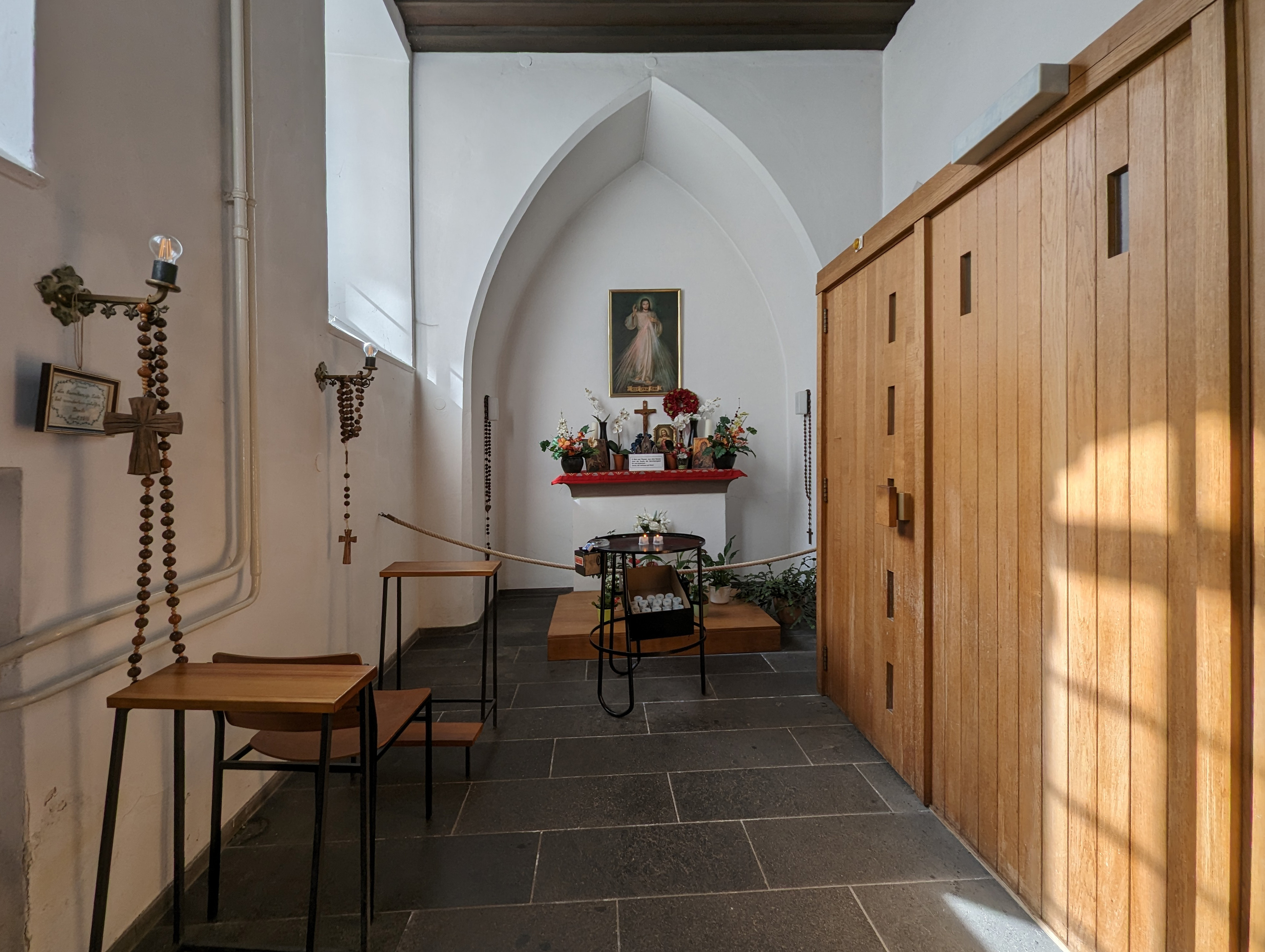

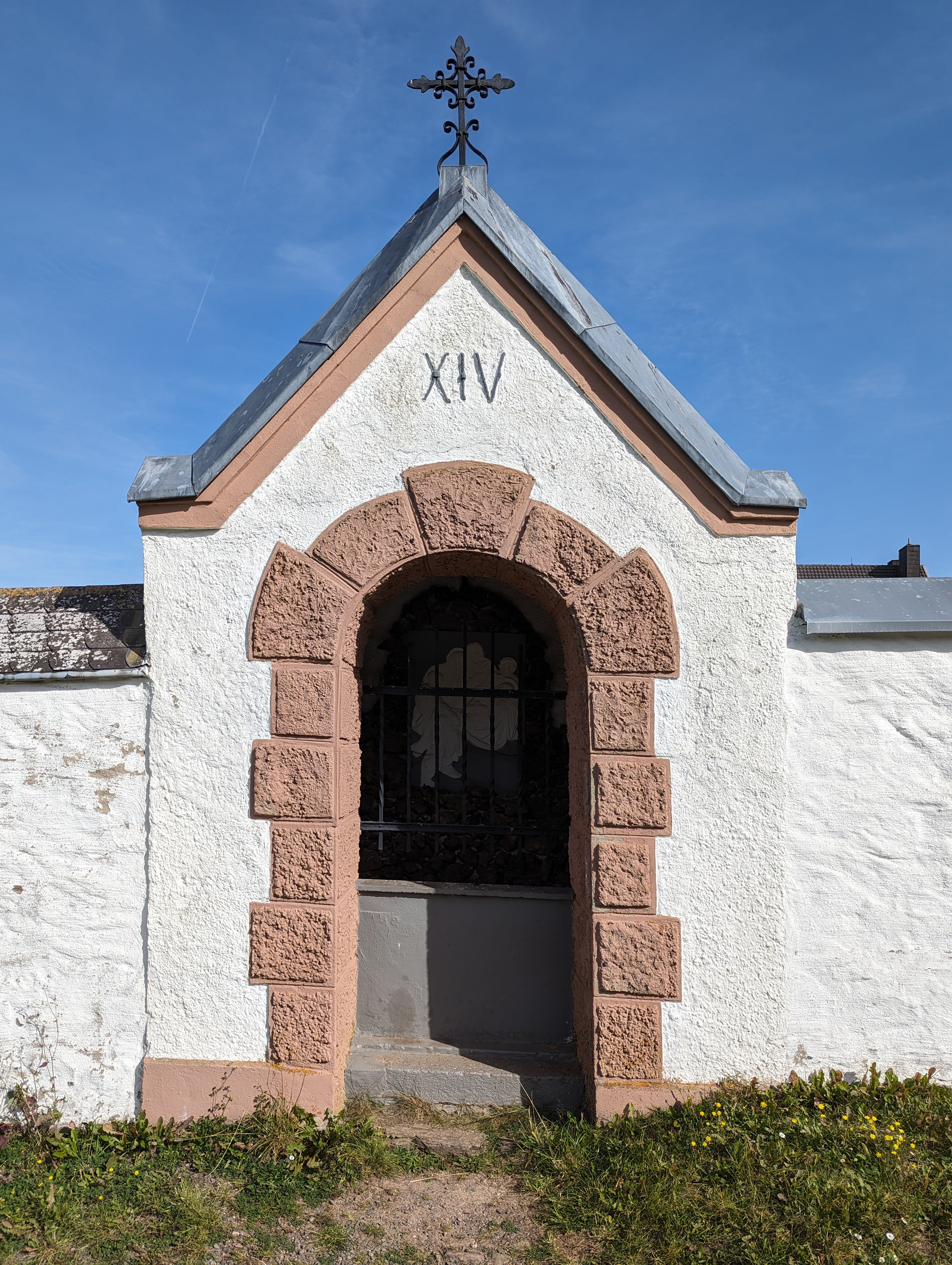

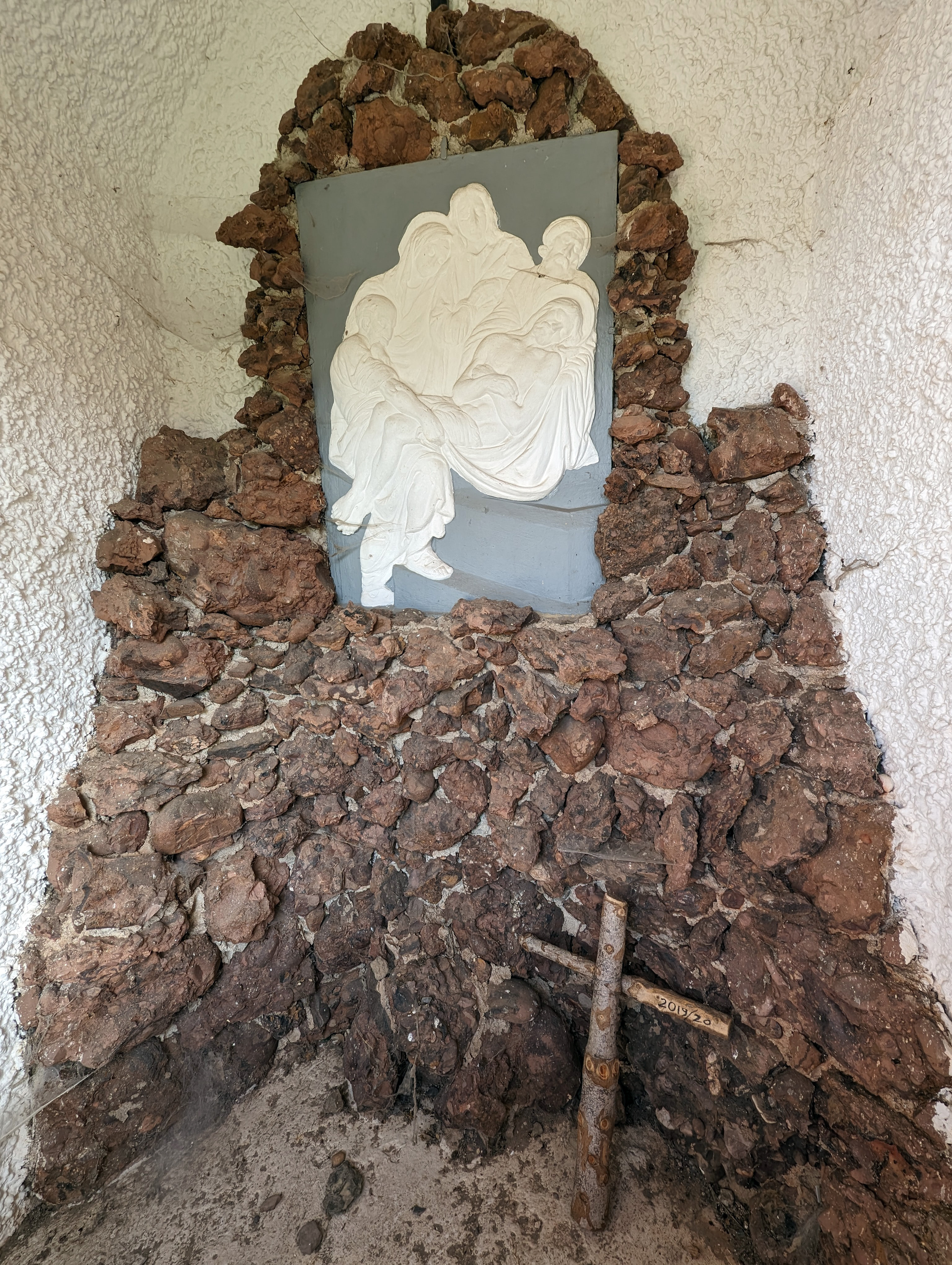

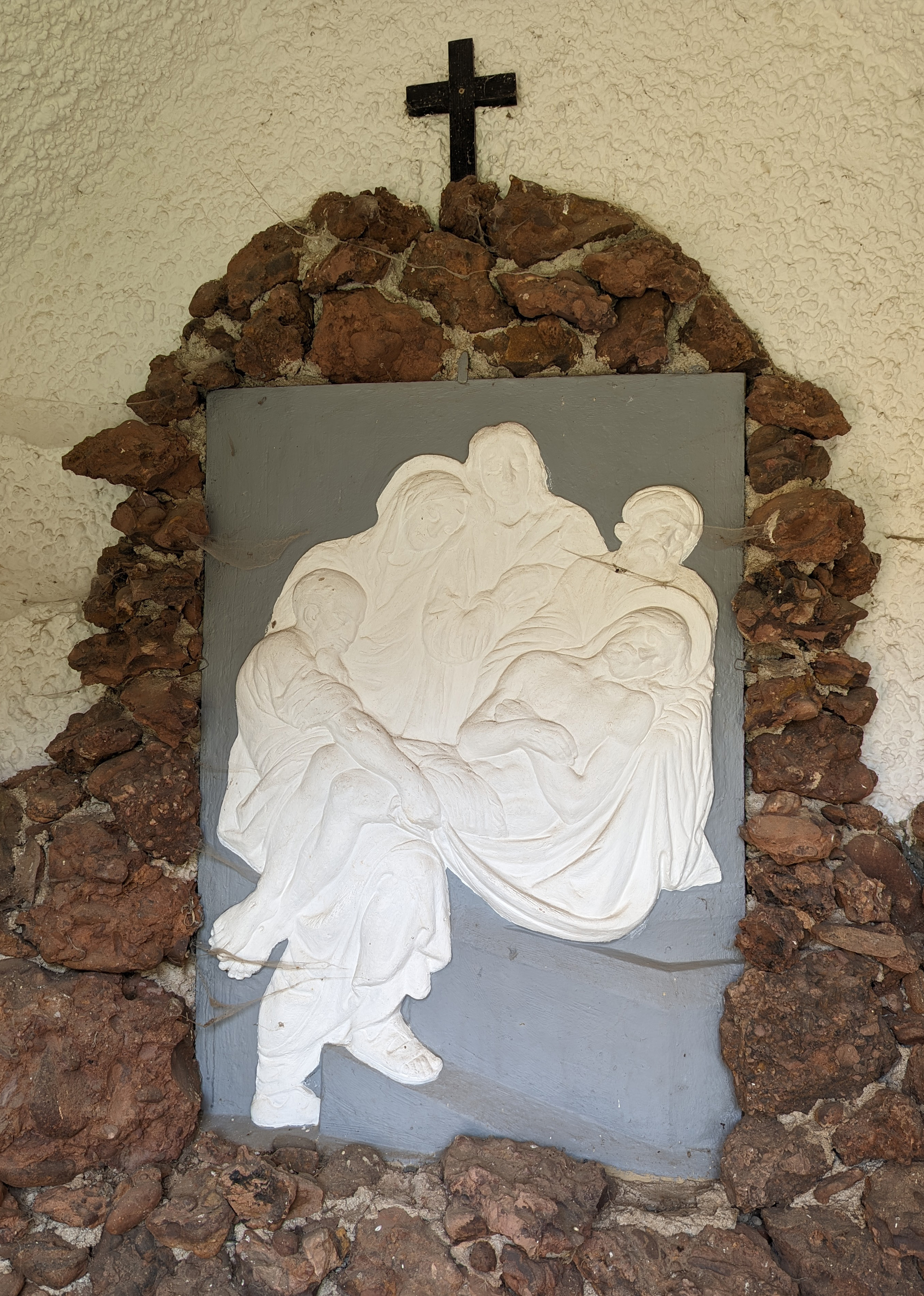
