= Bottenbroich Abbey =

Monastery

Coordinates: 50°53′06″N 6°44′17″E

Bottenbroich Abbey, later Bottenbroich Priory (German: Kloster Bottenbroich), was a former Cistercian religious house located in Bottenbroich, now in Frechen, about three kilometres north-east of Kerpen, in the present Rhein-Erft-Kreis of North Rhine-Westphalia, Germany.

== History ==
Bottenbroich Abbey was founded in either 1231 or 1234 by Provost Gottfried of Münstereifel as a Cistercian nunnery, under the supervision of Kamp Abbey. Thanks to an image of the Pietà of 1420, the place became a centre for the veneration of the Blessed Virgin Mary.

In 1448 the abbey fell into financial distress and its administration was handed over to Kamp Abbey, who re-settled it as a dependent priory of monks and restored its financial well-being. With the support of the von Hemmersbach family, who used Bottenbroich as their family monastery and place of burial, a new church was built, which was consecrated in 1484.

Between 1480 and 1486 the monks of Bottenbroich established Mariawald Priory to oversee another Marian pilgrimage site.

In 1777 the priory was subordinated to Marienstatt Abbey, and established as a provostry; the monks were re-settled to Marienstatt and Mariawald monasteries.

While the War of the First Coalition the area of Bottenbroich had been conquered by the French First Republic 1794. The Bottenbroich Priory was dissolved by consular decree 9 June 1802. The monastic church became the parish church.

In 1951 the entire village of Bottenbroich, including the former monastic church and all other structural remains of the monastery, was demolished to make way for the Frechen brown coal strip mine (Tagebau), and the inhabitants moved to Neu-Bottenbroich. The medieval Pietà is now situated in the Church of the Assumption (Mariä Himmelfahrt) in Grefrath in Frechen.

== Present day ==
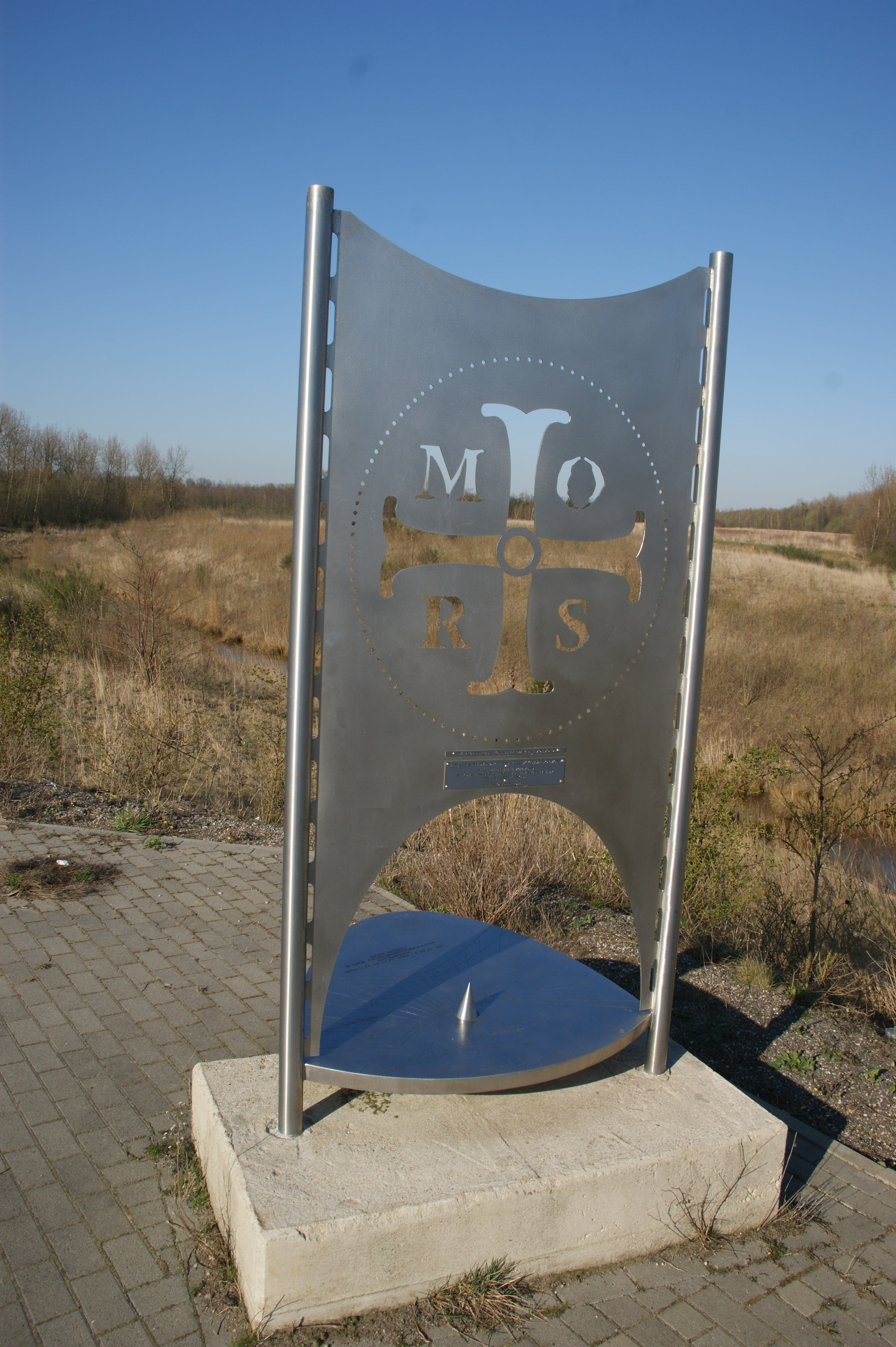
Sundial

In 2004 the site of the church, which in the meantime had been re-cultivated, was named Marienfeld in commemoration of its former significance as a pilgrimage destination.

In September 2006 in the presence of the monks of Stiepel Priory in Bochum a sundial was set up as a memorial in the Marienfeld on the site of the former monastery, bearing the arms of Morimond Abbey, mother house of Kamp Abbey.
