= Kamp-Lintfort =

- Town
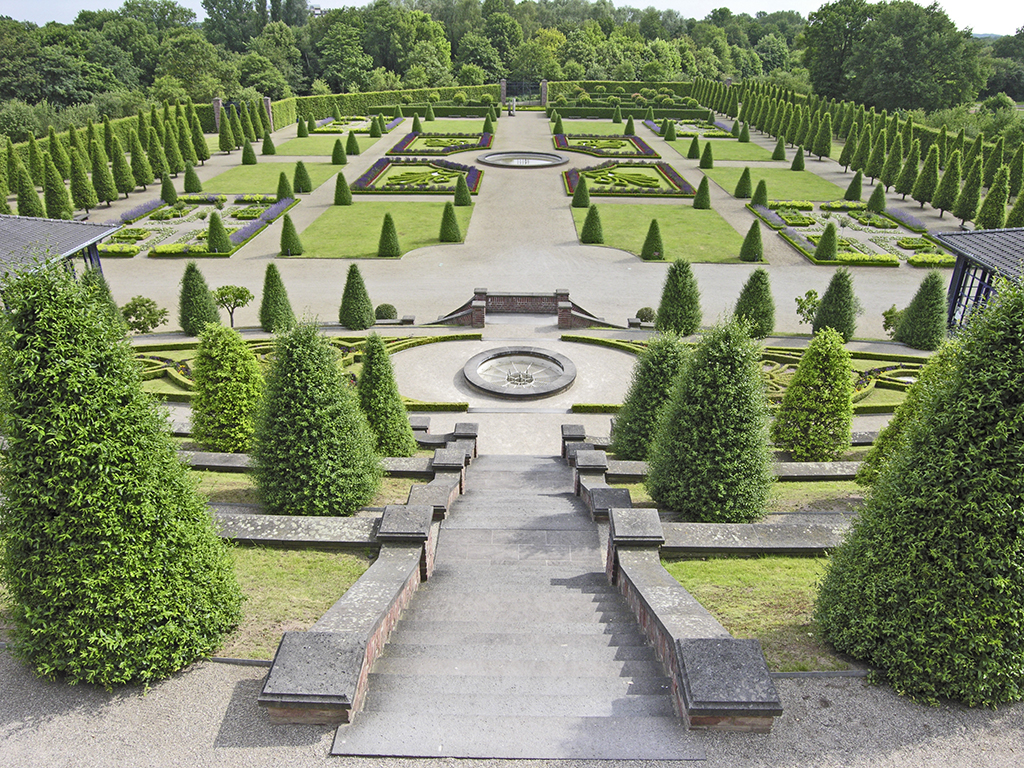
- Terraced gardens of Kamp Abbey

- Flag Coat of arms

- Location of Kamp-Lintfort within Wesel district
- Interactive map of Kamp-Lintfort
- Location within Germany Location within North Rhine-Westphalia
- Coordinates: 51°30′00″N 06°32′0″E
- Country: Germany
- State: North Rhine-Westphalia
- Admin. region: Düsseldorf
- District: Wesel

Government
  - Mayor (2020–25): Christoph Landscheidt (SPD)

Area
  - Total: 63.14 km^{2} (24.38 sq mi)
- Elevation: 33 m (108 ft)

Population (2025-12-31)
  - Total: 38,150
  - Density: 604.2/km^{2} (1,565/sq mi)
- Time zone: UTC+01:00 (CET)
  - Summer (DST): UTC+02:00 (CEST)
- Postal codes: 47475
- Dialling codes: 0 28 42
- Vehicle registration: WES
- Website: www.kamp-lintfort.de

Kamp-Lintfort (German: [kampˈlɪntˌfɔʁt]) is a town in Wesel District, in North Rhine-Westphalia, Germany. It is located 8 kilometres (5 miles) north-west of Moers.

== Population ==
Historical population

Year	Pop.	±% p.a.
1965	37,788	—
1970	38,736	+0.50%
1975	38,640	−0.05%
1980	37,956	−0.36%
1985	36,678	−0.68%
1990	39,019	+1.25%
1995	40,435	+0.72%

Year	Pop.	±% p.a.
2000	39,982	−0.23%
2005	39,636	−0.17%
2010	38,394	−0.63%
2015	37,683	−0.37%
2020	37,635	−0.03%
2025	38,150	+0.27%

Source: Landesdatabank Nordrhein-Westfalen

== Notable people ==
- Jacob Wiener (1815–1899), medallist and engraver.
- Adolf Storms (1919–2010), member of the Waffen-SS and war criminal
- Brigitte Asdonk (1947–2025), founding member of the Red Army Faction

== Twin towns – sister cities ==
Kamp-Lintfort is twinned with:

- Edremit, Turkey
- Żory, Poland
- Chester-le-Street, United Kingdom
- Cambrai, France

== Climate ==
Köppen-Geiger climate classification system classifies its climate as oceanic (Cfb). It lies within the Rhine-Ruhr area which is characterized by having the warmest winters in Germany.

Climate data for Kamp-Lintfort
Month	Jan	Feb	Mar	Apr	May	Jun	Jul	Aug	Sep	Oct	Nov	Dec	Year
Mean daily maximum °C (°F)	4.3 (39.7)	5.4 (41.7)	9.6 (49.3)	14 (57)	18.5 (65.3)	21.5 (70.7)	22.9 (73.2)	22.7 (72.9)	19.7 (67.5)	14.6 (58.3)	8.8 (47.8)	5.5 (41.9)	14.0 (57.1)
Daily mean °C (°F)	1.9 (35.4)	2.5 (36.5)	6.2 (43.2)	9.3 (48.7)	13.3 (55.9)	16.3 (61.3)	17.9 (64.2)	17.8 (64.0)	15.1 (59.2)	10.7 (51.3)	6.1 (43.0)	3.2 (37.8)	10.0 (50.0)
Mean daily minimum °C (°F)	−0.5 (31.1)	−0.3 (31.5)	2.8 (37.0)	4.6 (40.3)	8.2 (46.8)	11.2 (52.2)	13 (55)	12.9 (55.2)	10.5 (50.9)	6.9 (44.4)	3.5 (38.3)	0.9 (33.6)	6.1 (43.0)
Average precipitation mm (inches)	67 (2.6)	48 (1.9)	63 (2.5)	52 (2.0)	68 (2.7)	81 (3.2)	76 (3.0)	69 (2.7)	63 (2.5)	63 (2.5)	65 (2.6)	75 (3.0)	790 (31.2)
Source: Climate-Data.org (altitude: 29m)
