= Liévin De Winne =

Belgian painter (1821–1880)

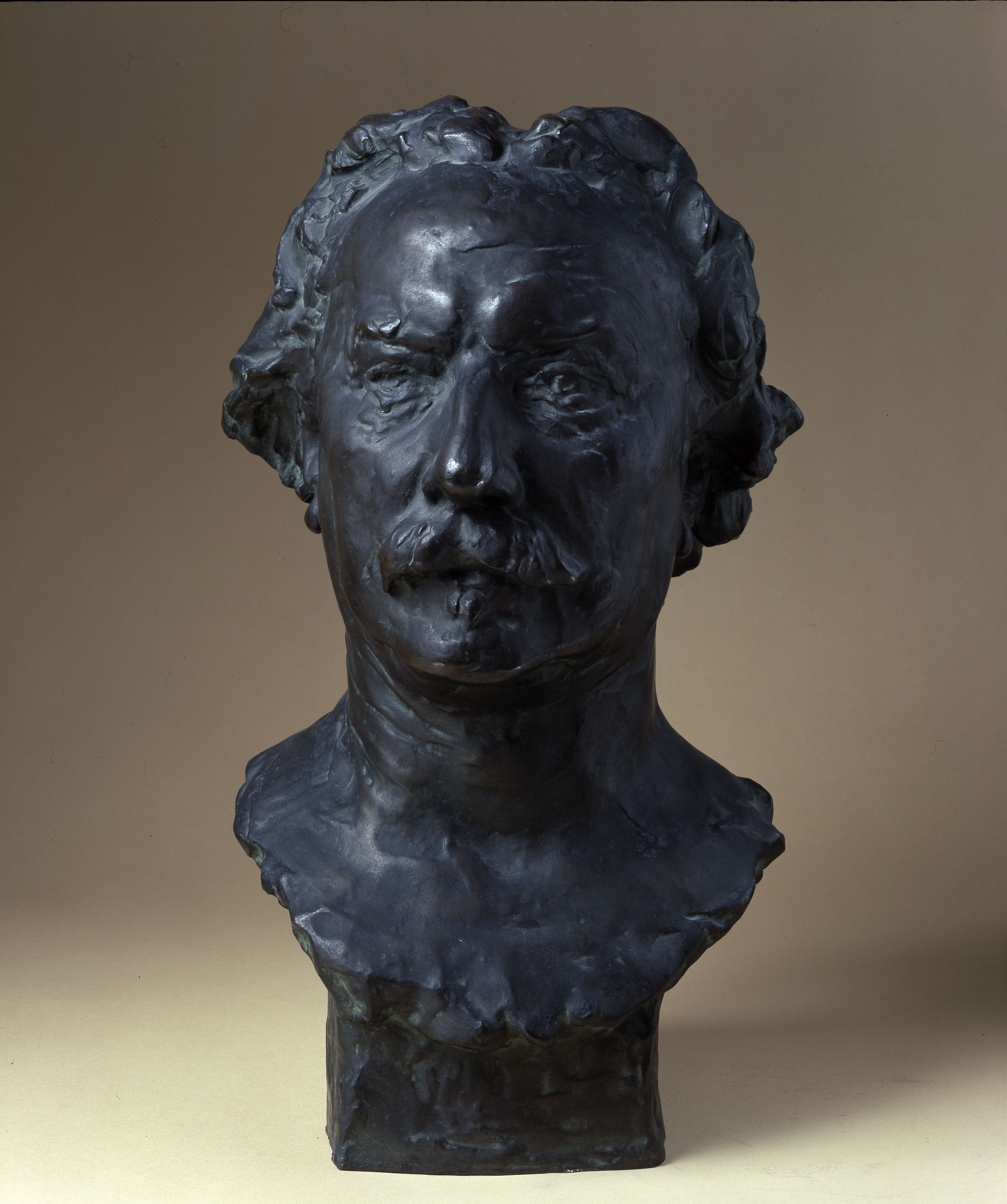
Liévin De Winne (by Paul De Vigne)

Liévin De Winne (Ghent, 24 January 1821 - Brussels, 13 May 1880) was a Belgian portrait painter who painted the official portrait of Leopold I on which the first postage stamp of Belgium was based.

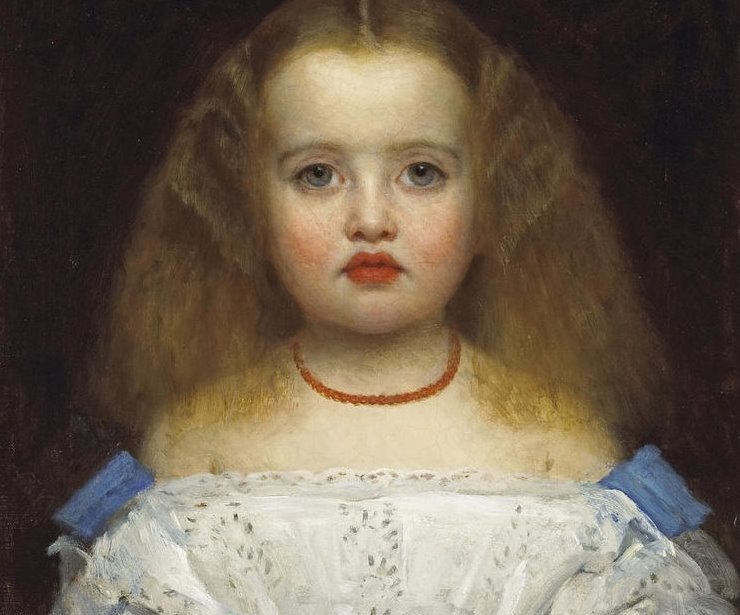
Portrait of a young girl with a coral necklace. Oil on canvas.

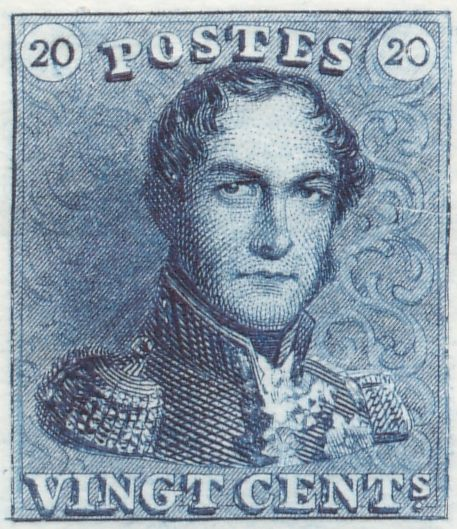
The first stamp of Belgium (1849), known as the Epaulettes, was based on the official portrait of King Leopold I by De Winne.

De Winne was a pupil of Félix De Vigne and Henri van der Haert at the Royal Academy of Fine Arts of Ghent. In 1850 he received a grant from the government of Belgium that enabled him to travel to Paris and from 1852 to 1855 he was able to share a studio with Jules Breton who subsequently wrote De Winne's biography. From 1861, De Winne resumed residency in Belgium where he established himself as a portrait painter to high society. His direct and insightful style won him many eminent clients and was a decisive break with the more romantic style of earlier Belgian portrait painting.

== Selected works ==
- Separation of Ruth and Naomi, 1853.
- St. Francis in Ecstasy, 1854.
- The holy women at the tomb of Christ, 1858.
- Emile Breton in uniform of captain of the guard furniture of the Pas-de-Calais, Palace of Fine Arts, Lille.
- Count and Countess of Flanders.
- Leopold I, 1860, Royal Museums of Fine Arts of Belgium, Brussels.
- P. Verhaegen, 1863.
- L. Roelandt, 1864.
- The American diplomat J.S. Sanford, 1878. Presented at the Universal Exposition in Paris.
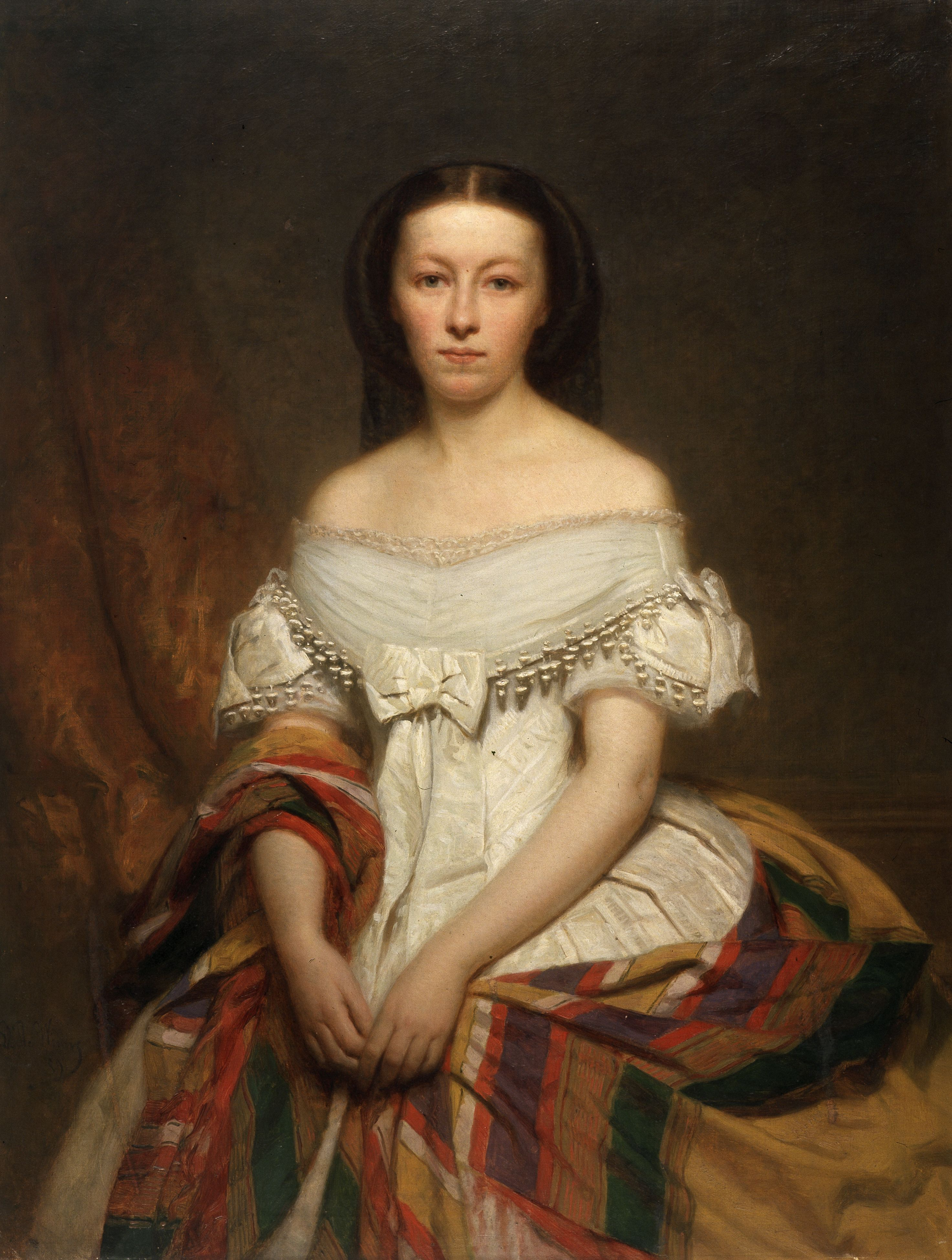
Mrs. Adolphe Neyt (1859)

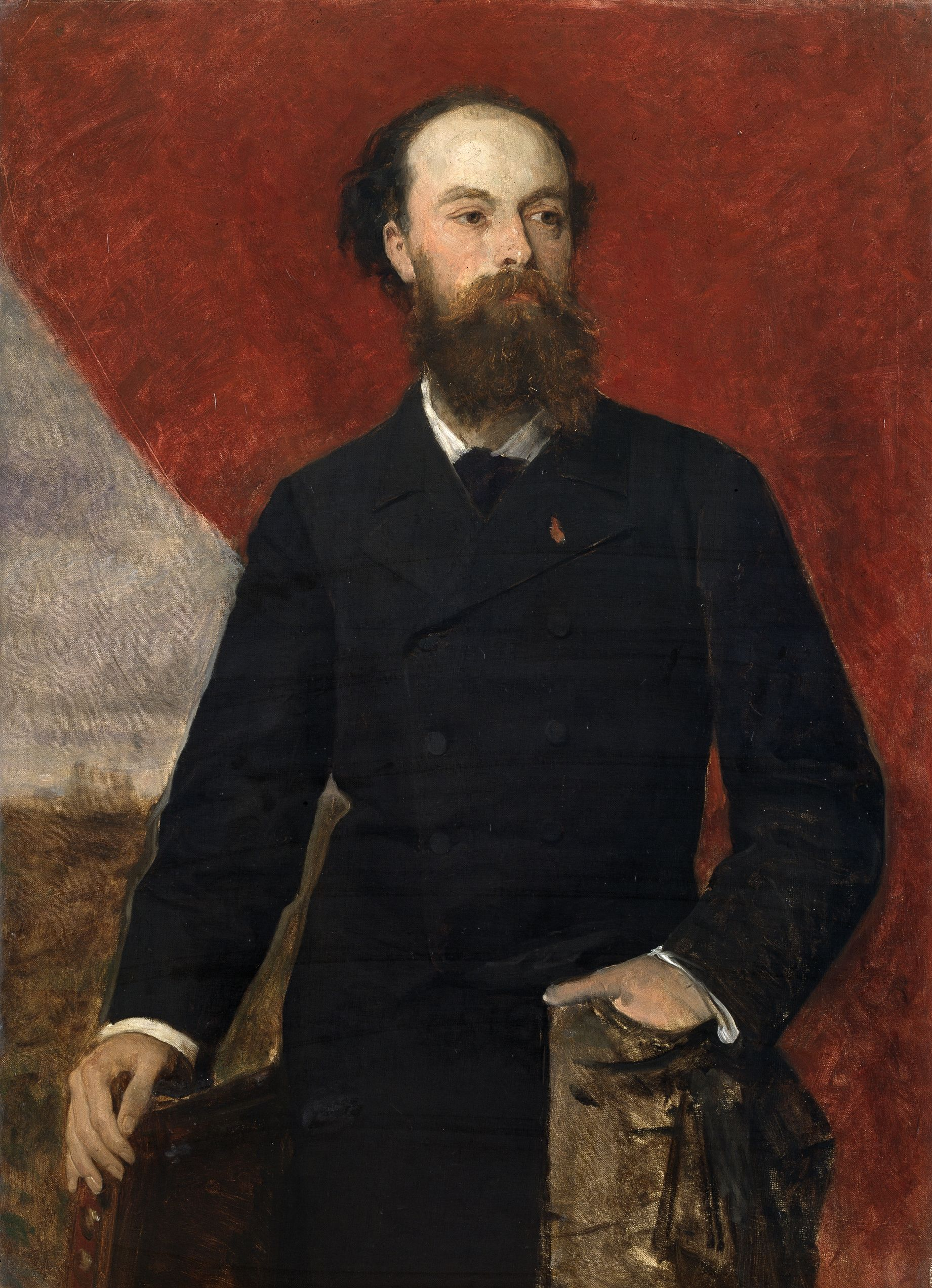
Paul de Vigne

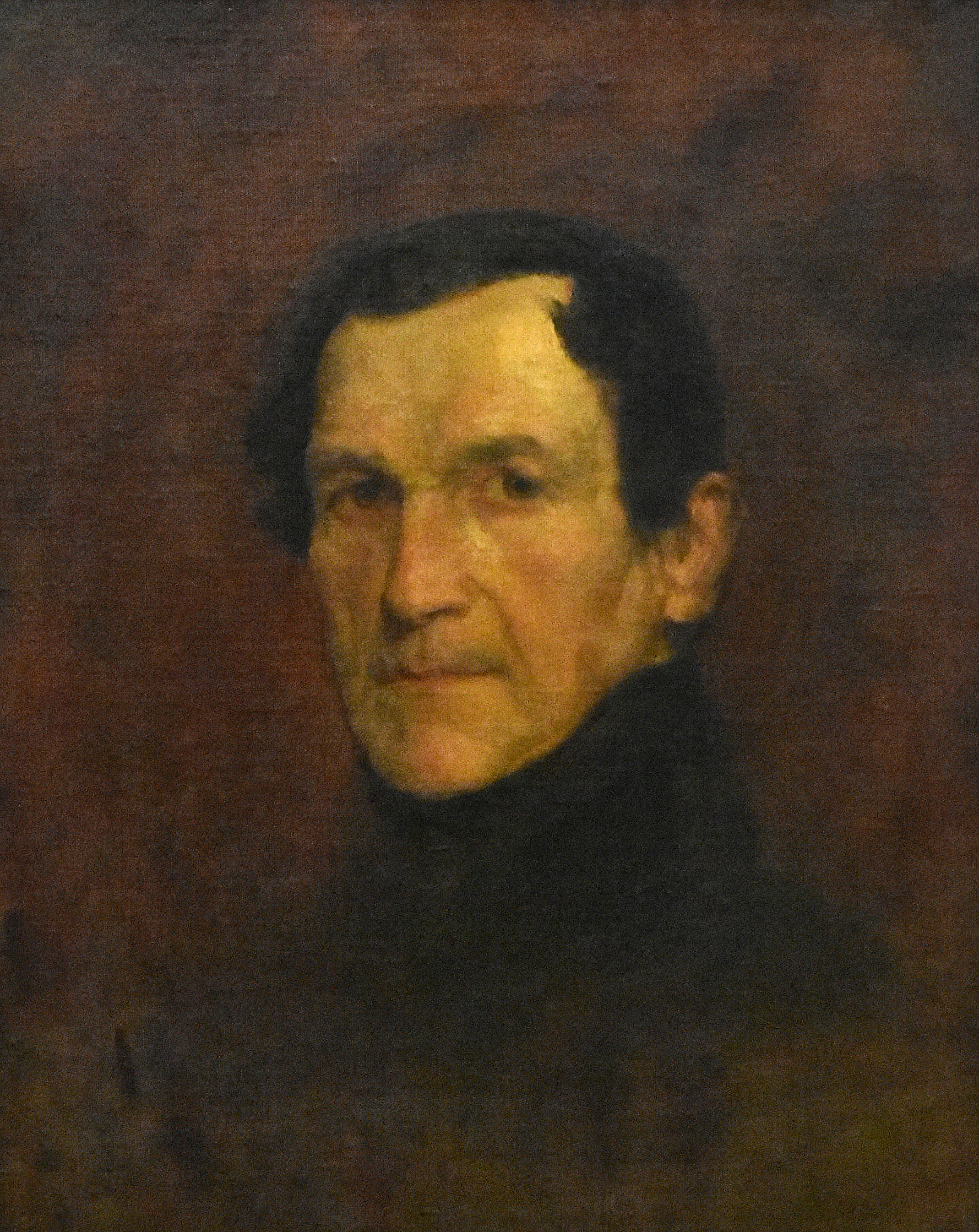
LLeopold I of Belgium (1860)

L.A. Roelandt (1864)

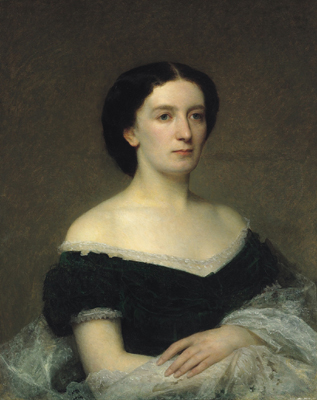
Portrait of a Lady
