= Kamp Abbey =

Coordinates: 51°30′08″N 6°30′58″E

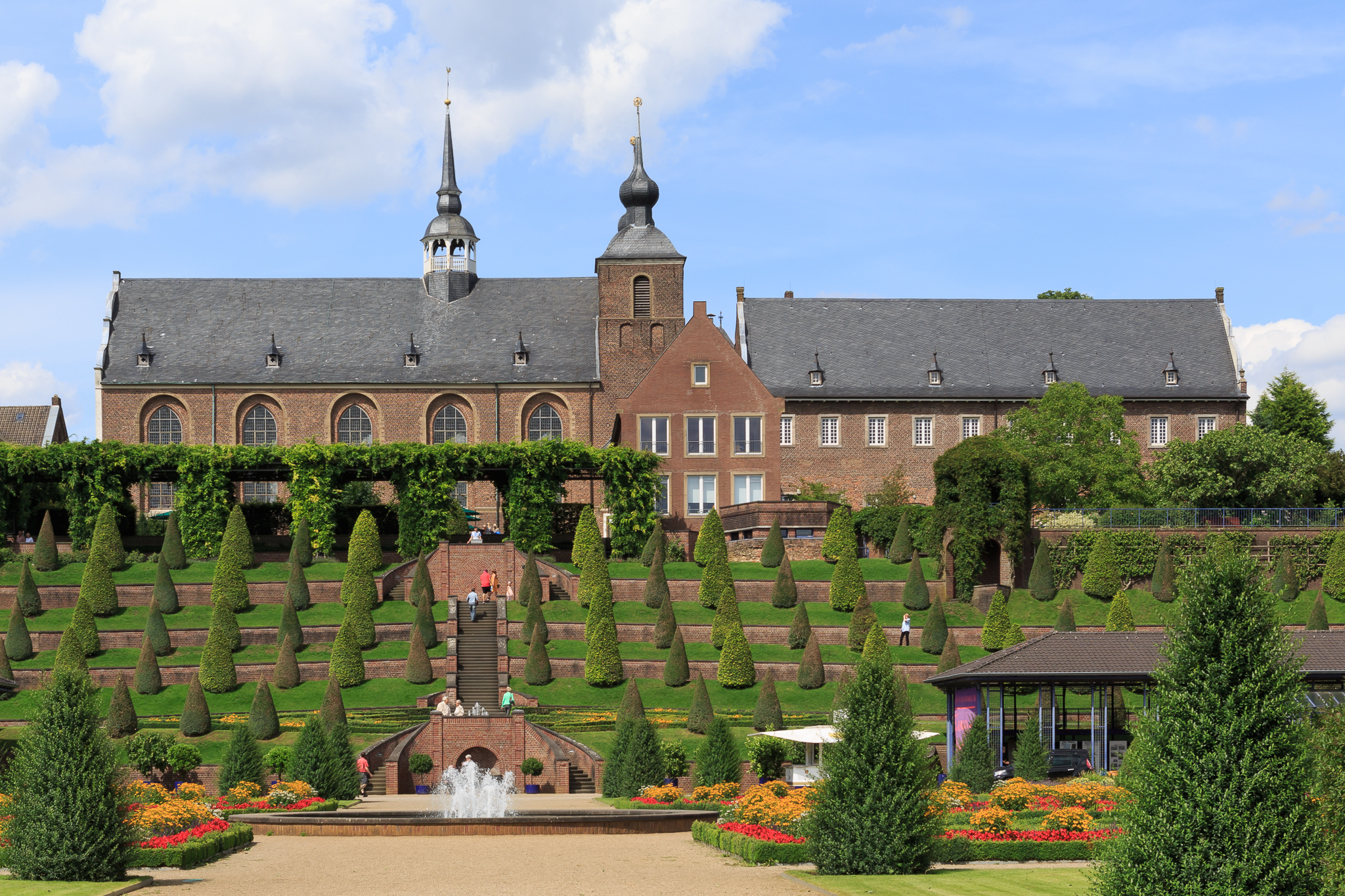
Terraced gardens at Kamp Abbey

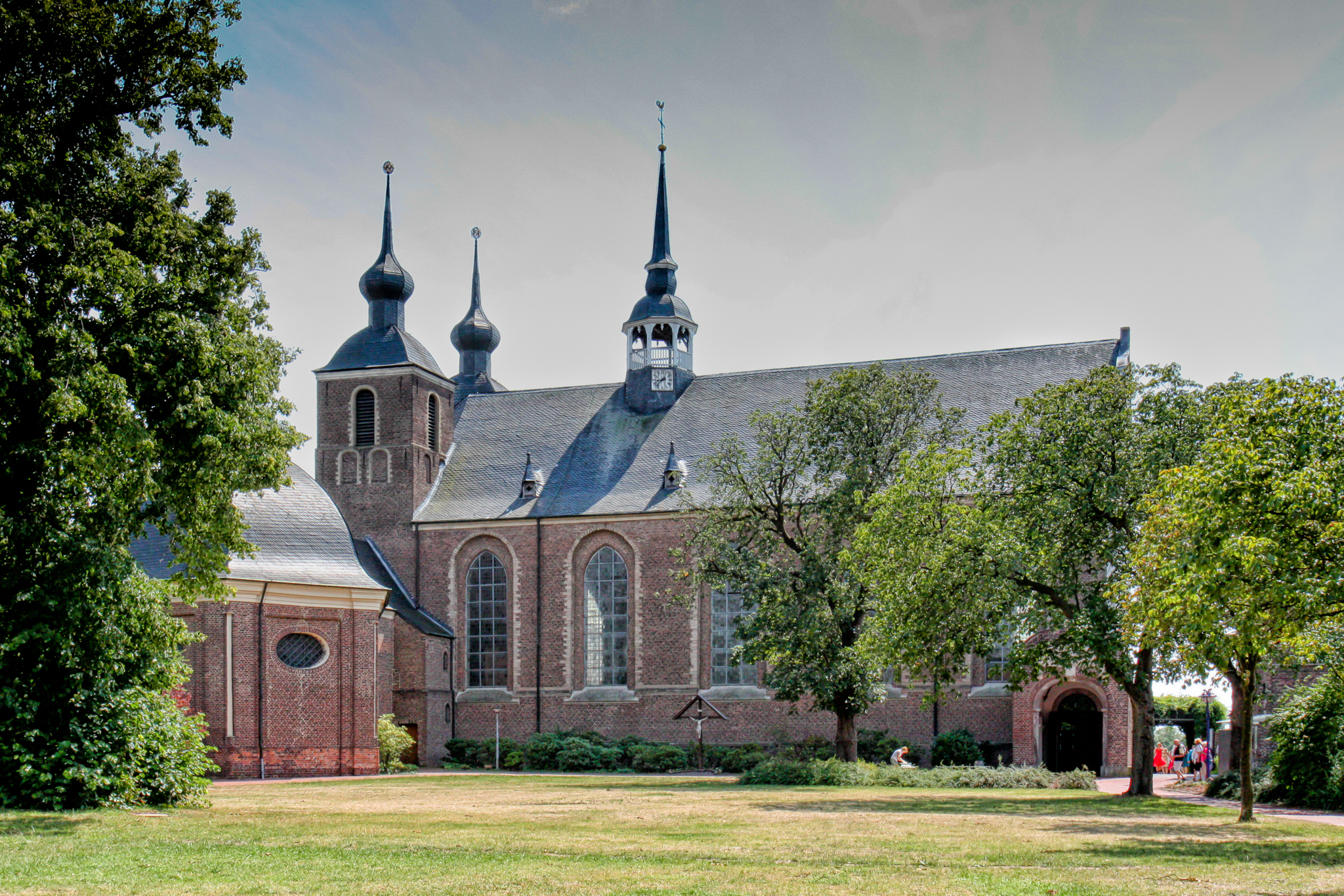
The church at Kamp Abbey

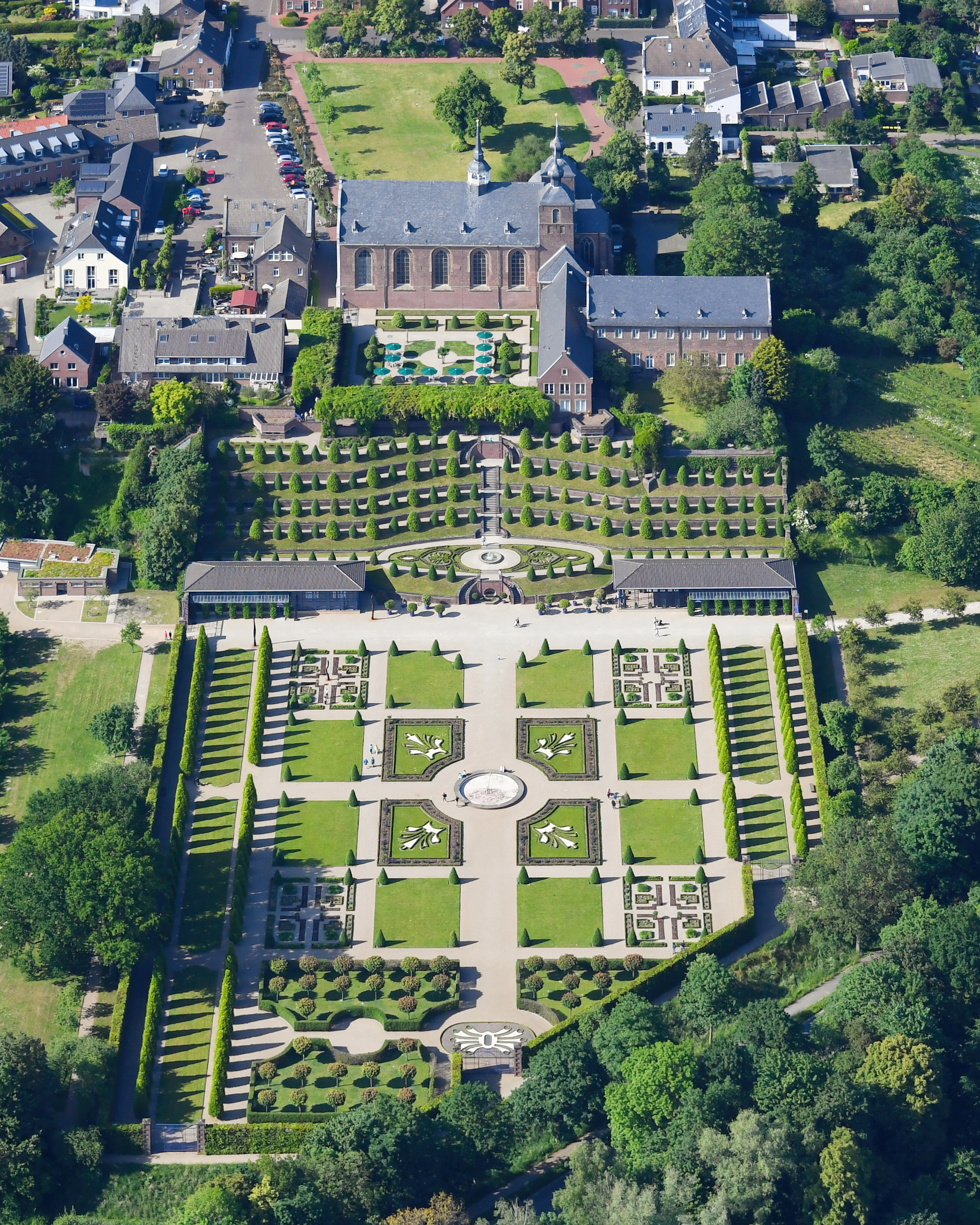
Aerial view of the Kamp Appel and its gardens

Kamp Abbey (Kloster Kamp), also known as Altenkamp Abbey or Alt(en)feld Abbey (and in English formerly Camp Abbey) was the first Cistercian monastery founded in German territory, in the present town of Kamp-Lintfort in North Rhine-Westphalia.

== History ==
It was founded in 1123 by Friedrich I, Archbishop of Cologne, and settled from Morimond Abbey. As the first Cistercian foundation in the region it attracted great endowments and became very wealthy and powerful. It was extremely active in the foundation of daughter houses:

In Germany: Walkenried Abbey (1129); Amelungsborn Abbey (c.1129); Volkenroda Abbey (1131); Hardehausen Abbey (1140); Michaelstein Abbey (1146); Saarn Abbey (1214); Neuenkamp Abbey (1231); Bottenbroich Abbey (1231); Burlo Abbey (1448); and Grevenbroich Abbey (1628);

In the Netherlands: Eiteren Abbey (1342); Mariënkroon Abbey(1382); and Sibculo Abbey (1412).

Kamp was largely rebuilt in the 15th century but suffered extensive damage in the Reformation. The abbey was abandoned early in the Cologne War (1583–1588); many of the monks went to the city of Neuss, where they underwent the siege and bombardment of July 1586; another portion went to Rheinberg, which was the focus of three battles to take the city, the last in 1589. The abbey itself was destroyed by Adolf von Neuenahr in 1586. A small group of monks returned under abbot Polenius (1636–64), but re-construction did not begin until 1683, and the community did not return fully until 1700.

The abbey was secularised during the German mediatisation of 1802 and the buildings were sold, and mostly demolished. The church was converted for use as a parish church.

Between 1954 and 2002 a Carmelite community resided on the remains of the monastery. The last monk left the monastery in 2010.

The abbey site is still known for the terraced gardens and the orangeries.
