= John Henry Robinson =

English engraver (1796–1871)

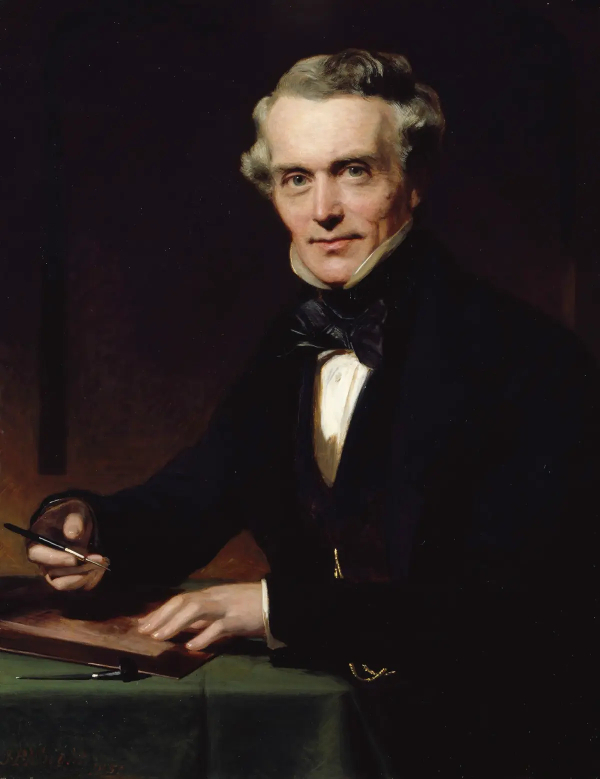
John Henry Robinson; by John Prescott Knight (1851)

John Henry Robinson RA (1796–1871) was an English engraver.

== Life ==
He was born at Bolton, Lancashire and was brought up in Staffordshire. At the age of 18 he became a pupil of James Heath, for about two years.

Robinson was one of the nine eminent engravers who, in 1836, petitioned the House of Commons on the state engraving in this country, and who with others in 1837, addressed a petition to the king asking for the admission of engravers to the highest rank in the Royal Academy: which was not conceded until some years later. In 1856, Robinson was elected an "associate engraver of the new class", and in the following year missed election as a full member only by the casting vote of Sir Charles Eastlake, which was given to George Thomas Doo; on the retirement of the latter in 1867 he was elected a royal academician.

Robinson received a first-class gold medal at the Paris International Exhibition of 1855. He died at New Grove, Petworth, Sussex, where he had long resided, on 21 October 1871, aged 75. Late in life he married a lady of property, which rendered him financially independent of his art. He was a justice of the peace for the county of Sussex and an honorary member of the Imperial Academy of the Fine Arts at St. Petersburg.

== Works ==
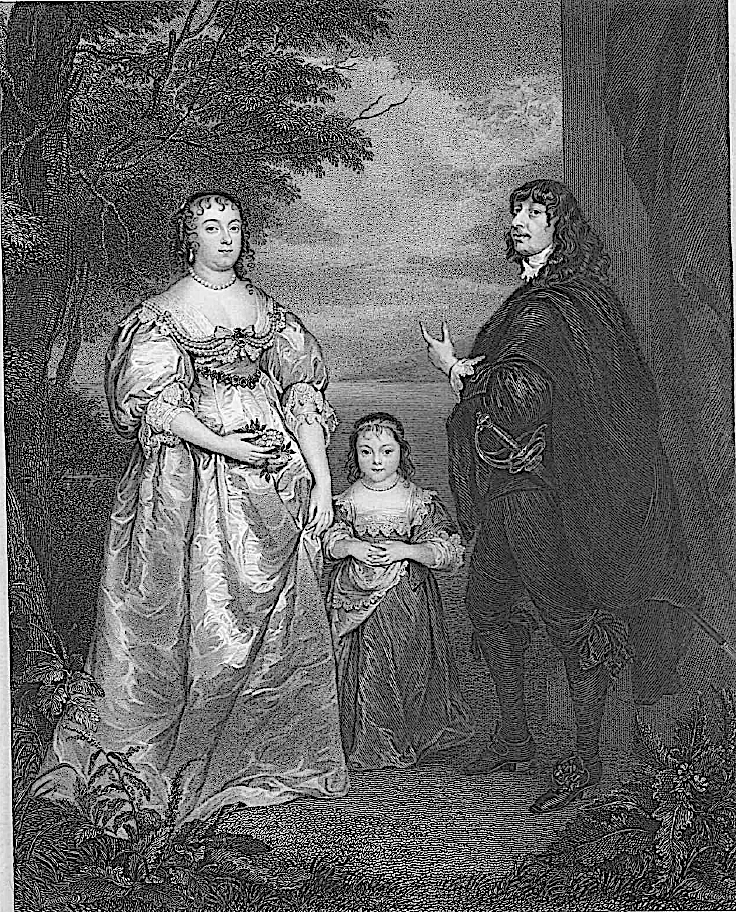
James Stanley, 7th Earl of Derby, and his wife, Charlotte de La Trémoille, after Van Dyck

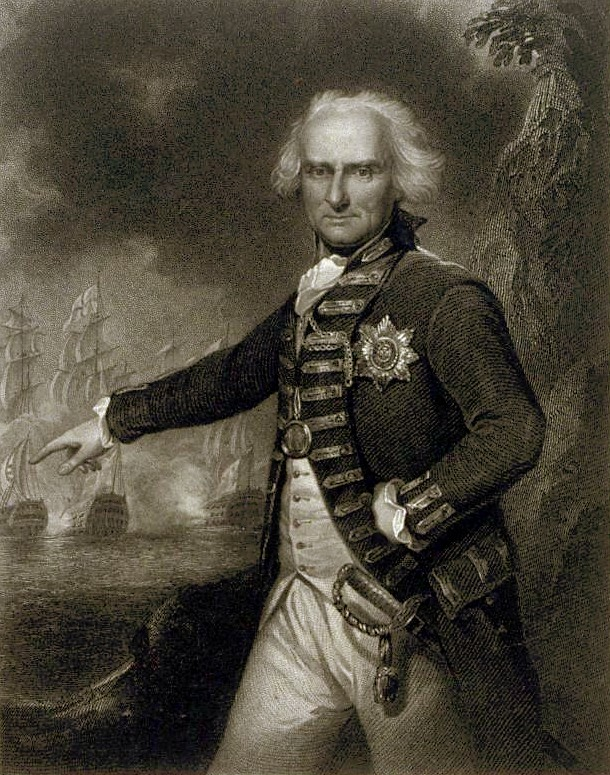
Alexander Hood, 1st Viscount Bridport, after Lemuel Francis Abbott (1835)

In 1823 Robinson was commissioned to engrave for the Artists' Fund The Wolf and the Lamb, the copyright of which had been donated by William Mulready, one of the founders of the Fund. The plate, for which the engraver received 800 guineas, proved a success. In 1824 Robinson sent to the exhibition of the Society of British Artists six engravings: The Abbey Gate, Chester, a Gipsy, and four portraits, including that of Georgiana, Duchess of Bedford, after Sir George Hayter; but he never exhibited again there.

In the next few years he engraved many private portraits and illustrations for books, including A Spanish Lady, after Gilbert Stuart Newton, for the Literary Souvenir of 1827; The Minstrel of Chamonix, after Henry W. Pickersgill, for the Amulet of 1830; The Flower Girl, after Philip Augustus Gaugain (1791-1865), for the Forget me not of 1830; and three plates, after Thomas Stothard, for Samuel Rogers's Italy (1830),24 plates after various artists for Le Bibliophile Jacob' 'Galerie des Femmes de George Sand' 1843 .

Among his more important works were:

- The Emperor Theodosius refused admission into the Church by St. Ambrose; and
- a portrait of the Countess of Bedford.

These were both after the pictures by Anthony van Dyck in the National Gallery.

- James Stanley, Earl of Derby, and his Family, also after Anthony van Dyck;
- The Spanish Flower Girl, after Murillo;
- Napoleon and Pope Pius VII, after Sir David Wilkie;
- Sir Walter Scott, after Sir Thomas Lawrence;
- The Mother and Child, after Charles Robert Leslie;
- Little Red Riding Hood (Lady Rachel Russell), The Mantilla (Hon. Mrs. Lister, afterwards Lady Theresa Lewis), Twelfth Night (Marchioness of Abercorn), and Getting a Shot, all after Sir Edwin Landseer;
- Queen Victoria, after John Partridge;
- The Sisters, after F. P. Stephanoff; and
- Bon Jour, Messieurs, after Frank Stone.

He sent to the Royal Academy of Arts exhibition in 1861 and again in 1864 his plate of Anne Russell, Countess of Bedford, after a picture by van Dyck at Petworth, which he reworked from time to time.

Further portraits were those of:

- George Bidder, the calculating boy, after Miss Hayter;
- Nicholas I of Russia, after George Dawe;
- Napoleon Bonaparte, when first consul, after Jean-Baptiste Isabey;
- Prince Augustus Frederick, Duke of Sussex, after Thomas Phillips;
- Baron Bunsen, after George Richmond;
- Luigi Lablache, after Thomas Carrick; and many others.

He was also responsible for the engraving of the first Belgian postage stamp, the so-called Epaulettes type.
