= Inverted Dendermonde =

Belgian postage stamp

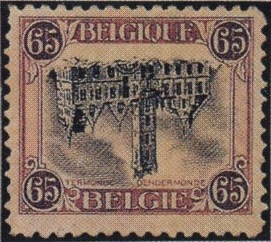
1920 inverted Dendermonde stamp

The Inverted Dendermonde is a Belgian postage stamp, issued in 1920.

Its catalogue numbers are:

- 124F (Michel catalog).
- 139a (Scott catalog).
- 182A (Yvert catalog)
- 182A-Dr (Officiële Postzegelcatalogus van België)

== Background ==
The 65-cent stamp, depicting the townhall of Dendermonde was issued on 5 August 1920. It was a completion of a definitive series of stamps printed between 1915 and 1919 which depicted on the lower nominations - 1 cent up to 25-cent - King Albert I and the higher nominations - 35-cent up to 10 Francs - various subjects.
Originally, the stamp was to have a denomination of 20 cents. By the time the commission was given, the postage rates had changed and there was a need for a stamp of 65 cents for express rate post. A run of 10 million stamps was ordered. The stamp was designed, engraved and printed by the Dutch company Joh. Enschedé in Haarlem, the Netherlands and exists in two versions: a first run was printed in sheets of 25 (5 by 5), a second run was printed in sheets of 100 (10 by 10). This was because of a shortage of paper. The two runs can be identified by the dimensions of the image. The first run has an image of 26,25 by 22,5 mm, whereas the second run's dimensions are 27 by 22 mm. Perforation measurement is 11½. End of use date was 1 May 1931.

== Inversion ==
Two sheets of the first run had its centre inverted so that the depicted town hall is upside down. Most likely the cause of this error was similar to that of the Inverted Jenny of the United States, since the Belgian stamp also has two colours. The first sheet was partially sold in the Post Office of Ghent. After this discovery was made, the management of the Belgian Post went to Enschedé to find out if there were more. A second sheet was discovered, transported to Brussels and destroyed.

One pane of the second run was also inverted. 50 copies of these were discovered in January 1921 in Leuven. They were confiscated by the Post Office before they could be sold to the general public. The remaining 50 were still in the Netherlands and were cut, this being witnessed by Dutch and Belgian officials. The 50 already in Belgium were destroyed by burning them on 21 January 1921.

== Known stamps ==
18 of the 25 stamps were sold at the Post Office of Ghent (French: Gand) on 13 August 1920. When the discovery was made, only seven copies remained.
At the moment [when?], there are 17 known copies: 15 unused and 2 used. The only known cancellation is "Gand 13 August 1920". In 1942 a stamp dealer from Brussels, who had two copies of the stamp, was murdered. The murderer and the two stamps were never found.

== Value ==
The cancelled stamp is valued at €75,000 and is one of the most expensive Belgian stamps.

== Popular culture ==
In 2003 the stamp was the subject of the comic book Het mysterie van de omgekeerde zegel ("The mystery of the inverted stamp") in the series Stam en Pilou.

In 2004, the stamp was the subject of a children's book De Omgekeerde Dendermonde ("The Inverted Dendermonde") by author Henri Van Daele.

In Season 32, episode 11 of The Simpsons, The Dad-Feelings Limited, Marge threatens to lick Postage Stamp Fellow's Inverted Dendermonde to force him to reconnect with his son, Comic Book Guy.

In Season 58, episode 143 of Days Of Our Lives (April 5, 2023), Stephan comments to Trask about his Inverted Dendermonde, inviting her to see it in his bedroom.
