= Abbey of Saint-Antoine-l'Abbaye =

Abbey in Isère, France

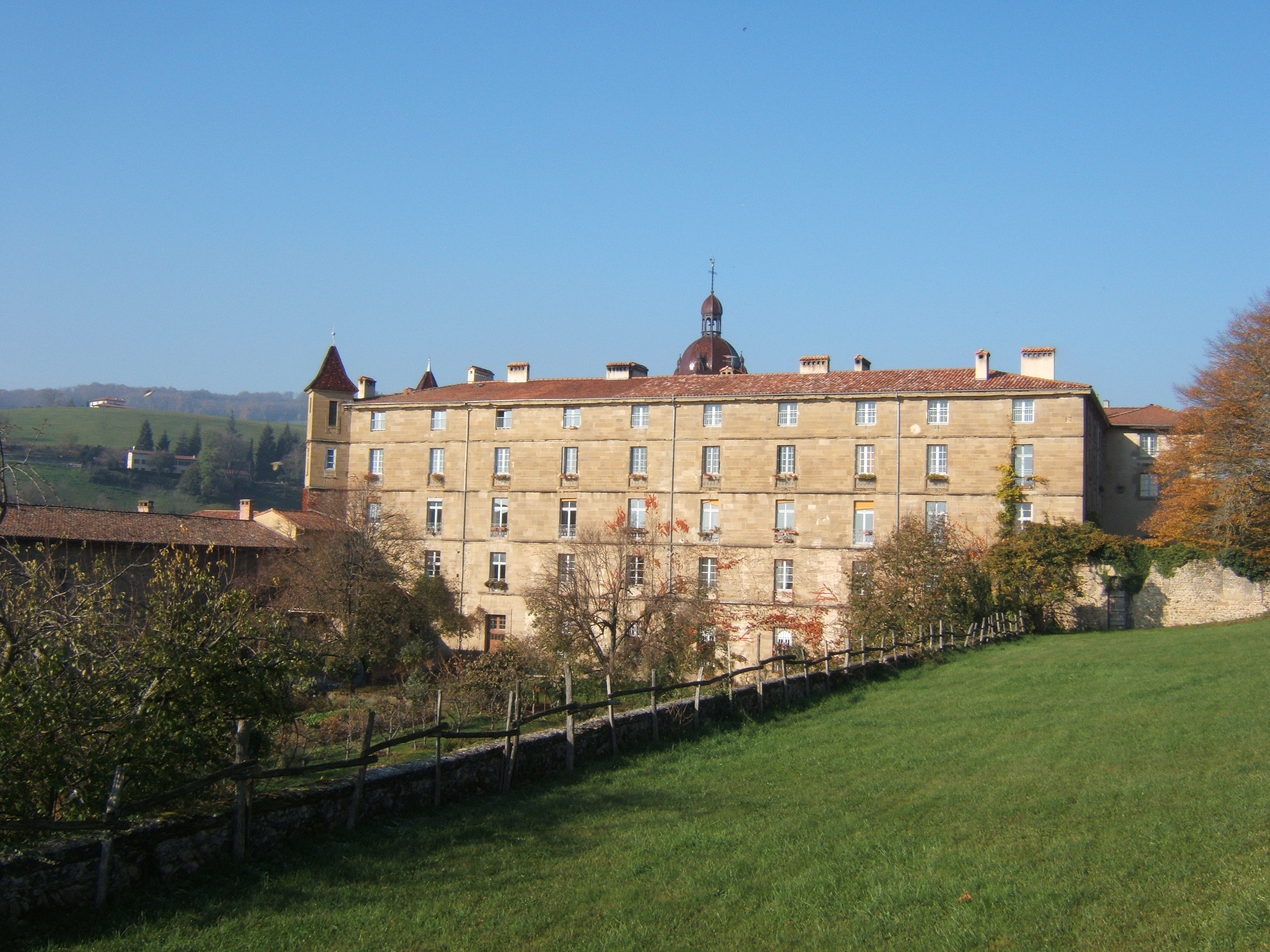
- Main façade of the abbey

- Location within France

Monastery information
- Order: Hospital Brothers of Saint Anthony
- Established: 1088
- Mother house: Abbey of Saint-Antoine-l'Abbaye

Site
- Location: Saint-Antoine-l'Abbaye, France
- Coordinates: 45°10′34″N 5°12′58″E
- Visible remains: substantial
- Public access: no

The Abbey of Saint-Antoine was the mother abbey of the Hospital Brothers of Saint Anthony. It is located in Saint-Antoine-l'Abbaye, in the department of Isère, in France. It includes an abbey church and premises that once housed the monks' homes.

== History ==
=== The origins ===
A knight by the name of Jocelin de Châteauneuf, son of the lord of La Motte-Saint-Didier in Viennois, was said to have been cured by Anthony the Great. When Anthony the Great appeared to him, he asked the knight to keep the promise he had made to accomplish the pilgrimage to the Holy Land and to bring back his relics of an anchorite from Thebaid who had conquered the fires of temptation. He left around 1074, with Guigues Didier. Jocelin set out to build a larger church but died before it was very advanced. His brother-in-law Guigues Didier continued the work. The pope ordered that the relics be deposited in a place conducive to worship. Guigues Didier called monks from the abbey of Montmajour and made a donation to them in 1083 to exercise curial functions in the parish of Notre-Dame and the church of Saint-Didier in the castle.

Shortly after, the Bishop of Valence Gontard, administrator of the then vacant Church of Vienne, authorized the Benedictine monks of the Abbey of Montmajour to establish a priory at Saint-Antoine. In 1088, the monks of Montmajour settled in Saint-Antoine and began the construction of the priory and the Romanesque church. Pope Urban II authorized them to deposit the relics of Saint Anthony in their church. This first church was consecrated by Pope Calixte II on March 20, 1119. Guigues Didier was present at this consecration and swore to observe the privileges granted by the pope to the new church consecrated "to the praise and in the name of the holy and indivisible Trinity, in honor of the ever-virgin Blessed Mary, and under the patronage of Saint Anthony".

An epidemic then struck Europe, giving the sick the impression of being burned alive and quickly gangrenous their limbs which, without bleeding, separated from the rest of their body. We then came to his relics to ask for the protection of Saint Anthony who had resisted the fires of temptation. In 1089 a young nobleman, Guérin de Valloire, struck by the sacred fire, made a vow, in the event of recovery, to devote himself to the sick. He is saved and with his father Gaston, founded a community. They created around 1095 a community of secular brothers known as the charitable company of Alms Brothers, and founded a hospice and a house of Alms near the priory. It treats contagious diseases, leprosy, bubonic plague or burning sickness and Saint Anthony's fire, ignis sacer or "sacred fire".

=== Abbey of Saint-Antoine ===
In 1191, a dispute arose between the Benedictines and the grand master of the Antonines, Pierre Soffred, over the right to send collectors in the name of Saint Anthony. The Antonins until then had to follow the services in the priory church. They wanted the construction of a chapel but the Benedictines opposed it. The Benedictines wanted to rebuild the large church and they started with the apse. The grand master of the Antonines, Falque I obtained from the archbishop of Vienne, Humbert II, the possibility of building a church dedicated to Notre-Dame, on January 29, 1208/1209, but with a limitation of dimensions.

At the end of the twelfth century, the Antonins already had nine commanderies in the Dauphiné, the commandery of Sant'Antonio di Ranverso (Saint-Antoine de Ranverso) built in 1188, in the Val de Susa. They have spread as far as Hungary. Many personalities have come to visit the abbey and pray over the relics of Saint Anthony. The oldest character mentioned, around 1200, is Saint Hugh of Lincoln.

In 1218, Honorius III authorized the brothers to take the three religious vows.

Around 1231, the Antonins became independent of the Benedictines. In 1247, Pope Innocent IV imposed on them the rule of the Canons of Saint Augustine.

In 1256, Pope Alexander IV authorized the Hospitallers of Saint-Antoine to build a hospital at the gates of the Benedictine priory. This hospital was to be the Grand Hospital or Hospital for the Dismembered, which received patients suffering from "burning sickness". Gradually abandoned, it was demolished in 1655. The disputes between the Benedictines and the Antonines will increase. In 1273, they went to the court of Rome concerning the donations and legacies made to the Antonines.

The Benedictines began the new large church with the choir at the end of the 13th century, but work stopped when they left Saint-Antoine.

In 1289, Aymon de Montagne, grand master of the Antonins, obtained from the abbot of Montmajour, Étienne de Sola de Montarene, free and complete possession of the Benedictine priory of Saint-Antoine, for his lifetime. Some time before, he had bought the seigneury from Aymar de Châteauneuf.

The Benedictines were driven out of the priory of Saint-Antoine by a coup led by Pierre de Parnans, gentleman of the house of Aumône and men-at-arms. The Antonins then become responsible for all the religious service of the parish.

In 1293, the Abbé de Montmajour asked the Archbishop of Vienne to restore his abbey at Saint-Antoine. From this expulsion, a quarrel arose: Were the relics of saint Antoine in the abbey of Saint-Antoine or were they in the church Saint-Julien of Arles where they would have been deposited on January 9, 1490, by the monks of Montmajour?

The priory of Saint-Antoine was erected as a chief abbey by Pope Boniface VIII on June 10, 1297. To compensate the abbey of Montmajour for the loss of the priory of Saint-Antoine, the pope forced the Antonins to pay the abbey of Montmajour an annual pension of 1,300 pounds tournaments. Aymon de Montagne became its first abbot. The Hospitaller Order of Saint-Antoine then possessed many houses and commanderies, even in distant regions.

In 1317 his successor, Ponce d'Alairac, found the monastery heavily in debt following negotiations to acquire the seigneury, the priory and organize the new abbey. To surround the town with defences, he must ask for the participation of the inhabitants.

It was in 1337, with the third abbot, Guillaume Mitte, that the construction of the great church was able to resume after a break of more than 47 years, thanks to a bequest from his brother Ponce Mitte which enabled the chevet to be completed around 1342. This explains the change of style in the church from the triumphal arch. All the houses and commanderies of the order will participate in the financing of the great church of the hospital. Fundraising efforts for the General Chapter were encouraged by Pope Urban V. Abbot Ponce Mitte (1370-1374), nephew of Guillaume Mitte, built the large refectory.

Construction continued steadily along the entire length of the building towards the façade. Work on the last two bays of the nave and the side aisles were carried out between 1343 and 1362. The fourth bay of the nave was built between 1389 and 1417. In 1400, the vaulting of nave began.
