= Saint Jerome at Prayer (La Tour) =

Painting by Georges de La Tour

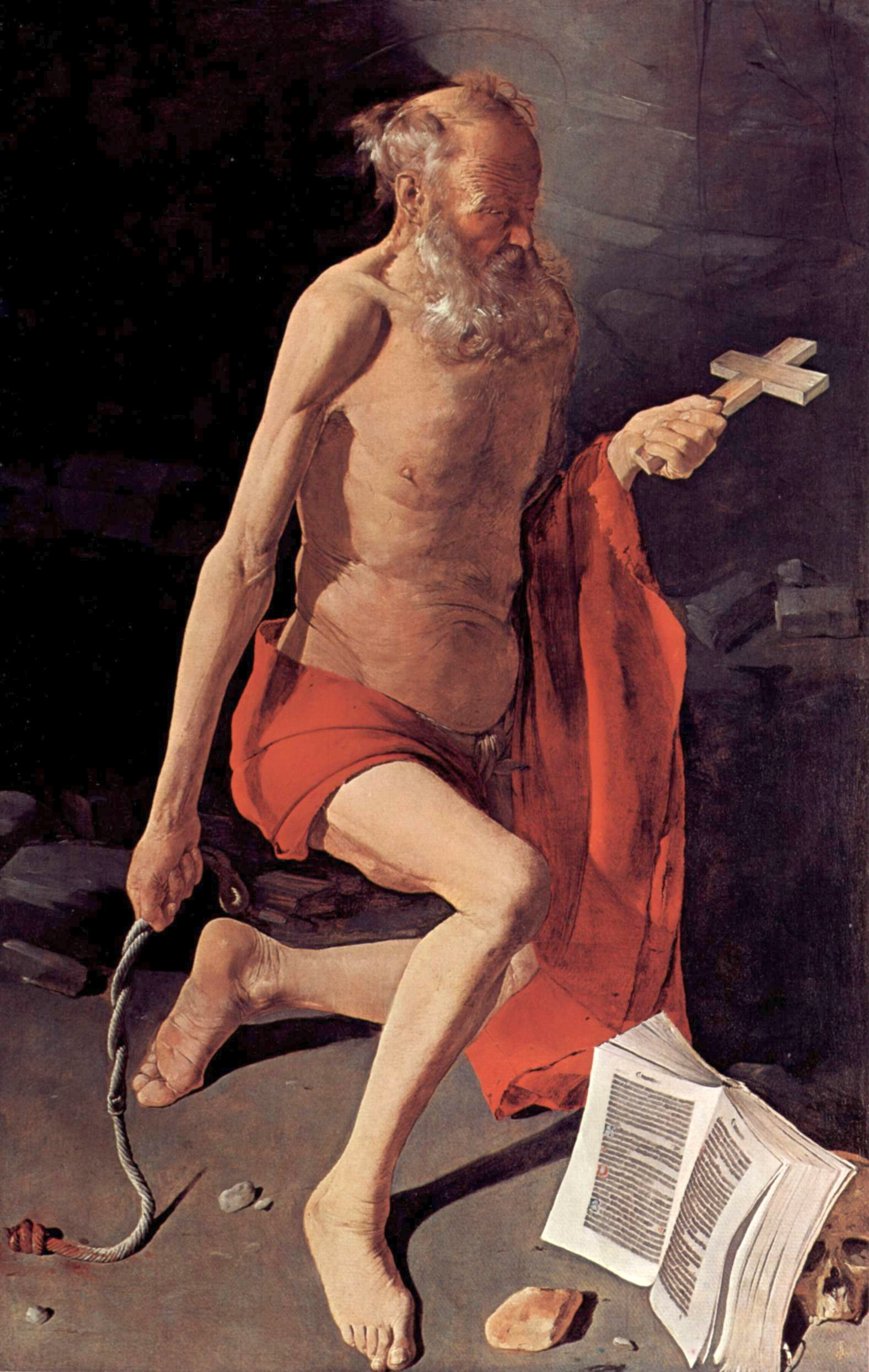
Grenoble version

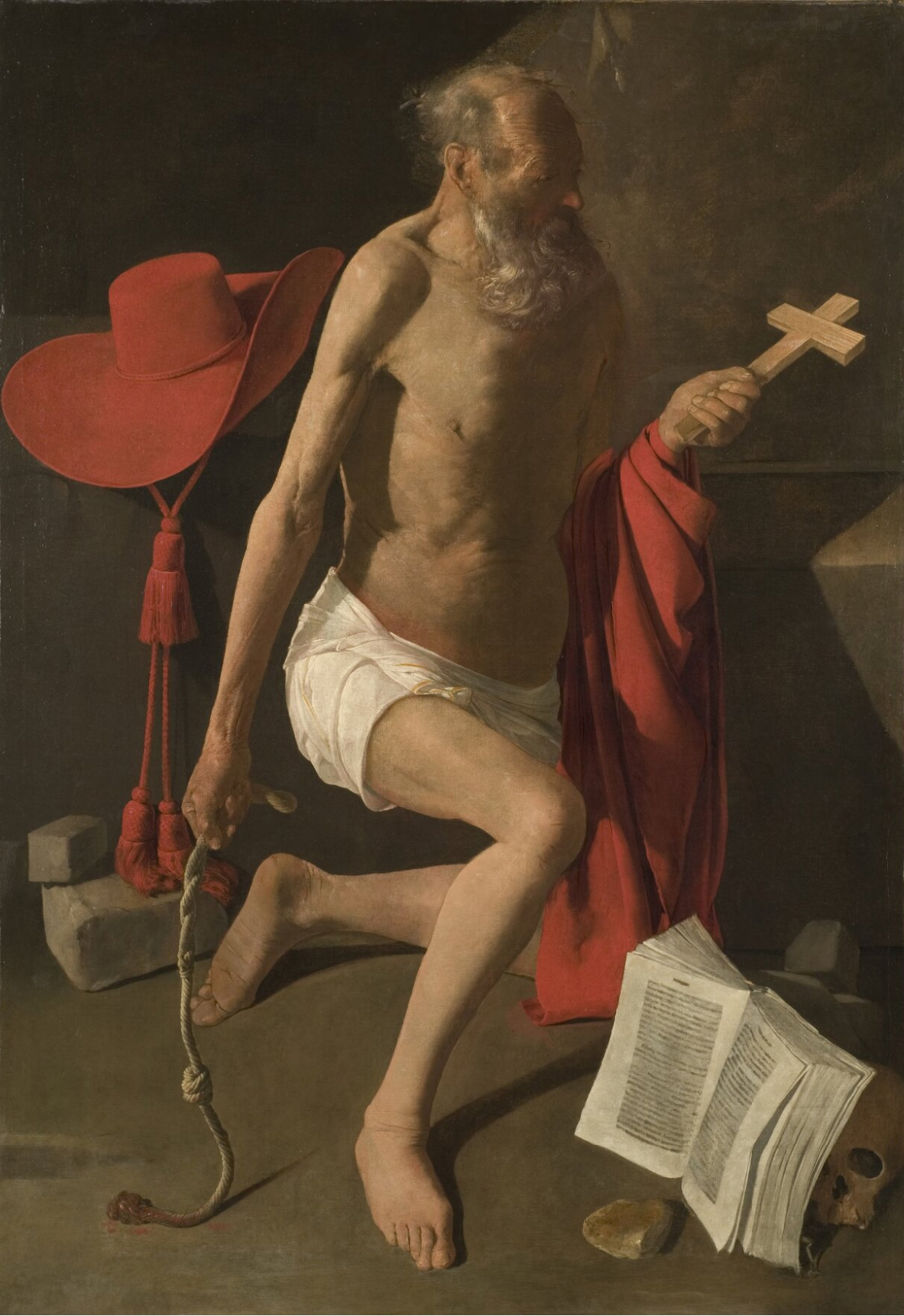
Stockholm version

St Jerome at Prayer is an oil-on-canvas painting executed ca. 1630–1635 by the French artist Georges de La Tour. He produced it for the abbey church of Saint-Antoine-l'Abbaye, but it was confiscated by the state on the French Revolution and is now in the Museum of Grenoble. An autograph copy with some variations was produced sometime before 1642 and is now in the Nationalmuseum in Stockholm.

== References (in English) ==
- Conisbee, Philip. “An Introduction to the Life and Art of Georges de La Tour,” in Philip Conisbee (ed.), Georges de La Tour and His World, exh. cat. Washington, DC, National Gallery of Art; Fort Worth, Kimbell Art Museum 1996, pp. 13–147.
- Judovitz, Dalia. “Georges de La Tour and the Enigma of the Visible”, New York, Fordham University Press, 2018. ISBN 0-82327-744-5; ISBN 9780823277445.

== Bibliography in French ==
- Pierre Rosenberg, Marina Mojana, Georges de La Tour, catalogue complet des peintures, Paris, Bordas 1992
- Dimitri Salmon: "Saint Jérôme pénitant dit aussi Saint Jérôme au chapeau cardinalice", i Dimitri Salmon et al.: Saint Jérôme & Georges de La Tour, Vic-sur-Seille 2013
