= Mohrkirch =

Mohrkirch Mårkær
- Municipality
- Coat of arms

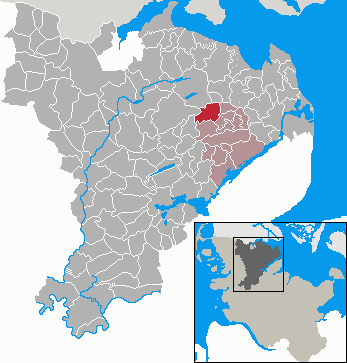
- Location of Mohrkirch; Mårkær within Schleswig-Flensburg district
- Interactive map of Mohrkirch; Mårkær
- Location within Germany Location within Schleswig-Holstein
- Coordinates: 54°40′0″N 9°42′46″E
- Country: Germany
- State: Schleswig-Holstein
- District: Schleswig-Flensburg
- Municipal assoc.: Süderbrarup

Government
  - Mayor: Erwin Hansen (CDU)

Area
  - Total: 14.42 km^{2} (5.57 sq mi)
- Elevation: 27–70 m (89–230 ft)

Population (2025-12-31)
  - Total: 938
  - Density: 65.0/km^{2} (168/sq mi)
- Time zone: UTC+01:00 (CET)
  - Summer (DST): UTC+02:00 (CEST)
- Postal codes: 24405
- Dialling codes: 04646
- Vehicle registration: SL
- Website: www.suederbrarup.de

Mohrkirch (German: [ˈmoːɐ̯ˌkɪʁç], Danish: Mårkær) is a municipality in the district of Schleswig-Flensburg, in Schleswig-Holstein, Germany.

== See also ==
- Mårkær Monastery
