= Hospital Brothers of Saint Anthony =

Roman catholic religious order

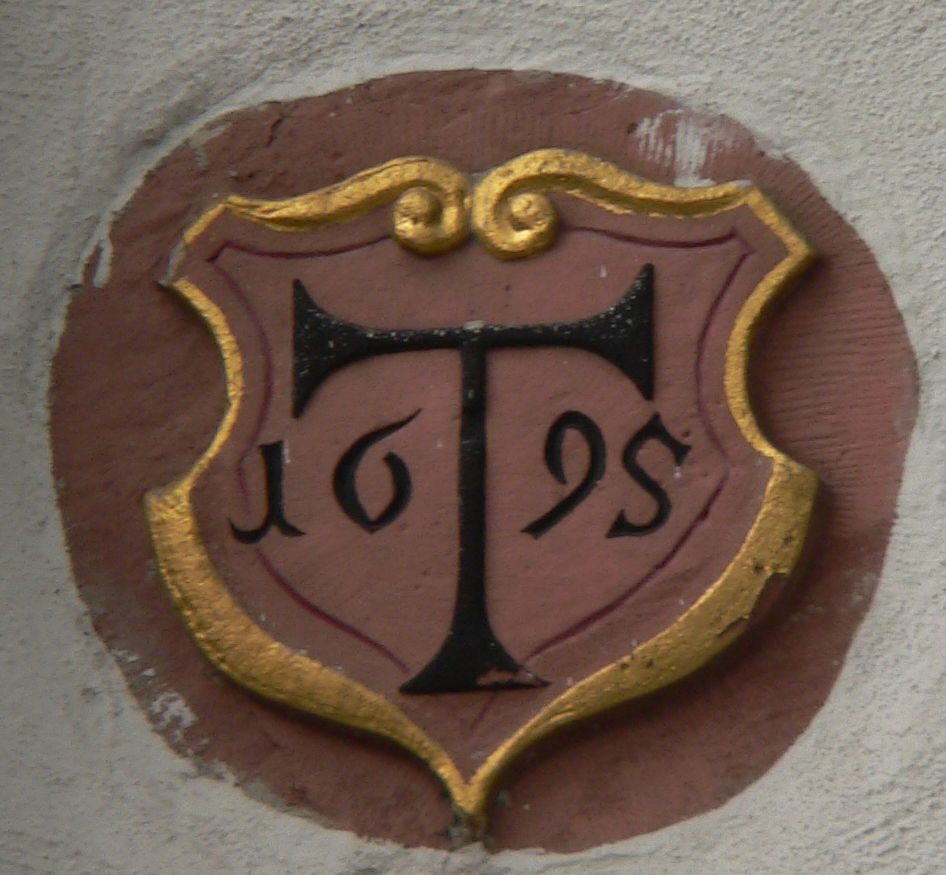
Saint Anthony's Cross on the former Antonine hospital in Höchst am Main

The Hospital Brothers of Saint Anthony, Order of Saint Anthony or Canons Regular of Saint Anthony of Vienne (Canonici Regulares Sancti Antonii, or CRSAnt), also Antonines or Antonites, were a congregation in the Roman Catholic church, founded in c. 1095, with the purpose of caring for those suffering from the common medieval disease of Saint Anthony's fire. The mother abbey was the abbey of Saint-Antoine-l'Abbaye.

== History ==
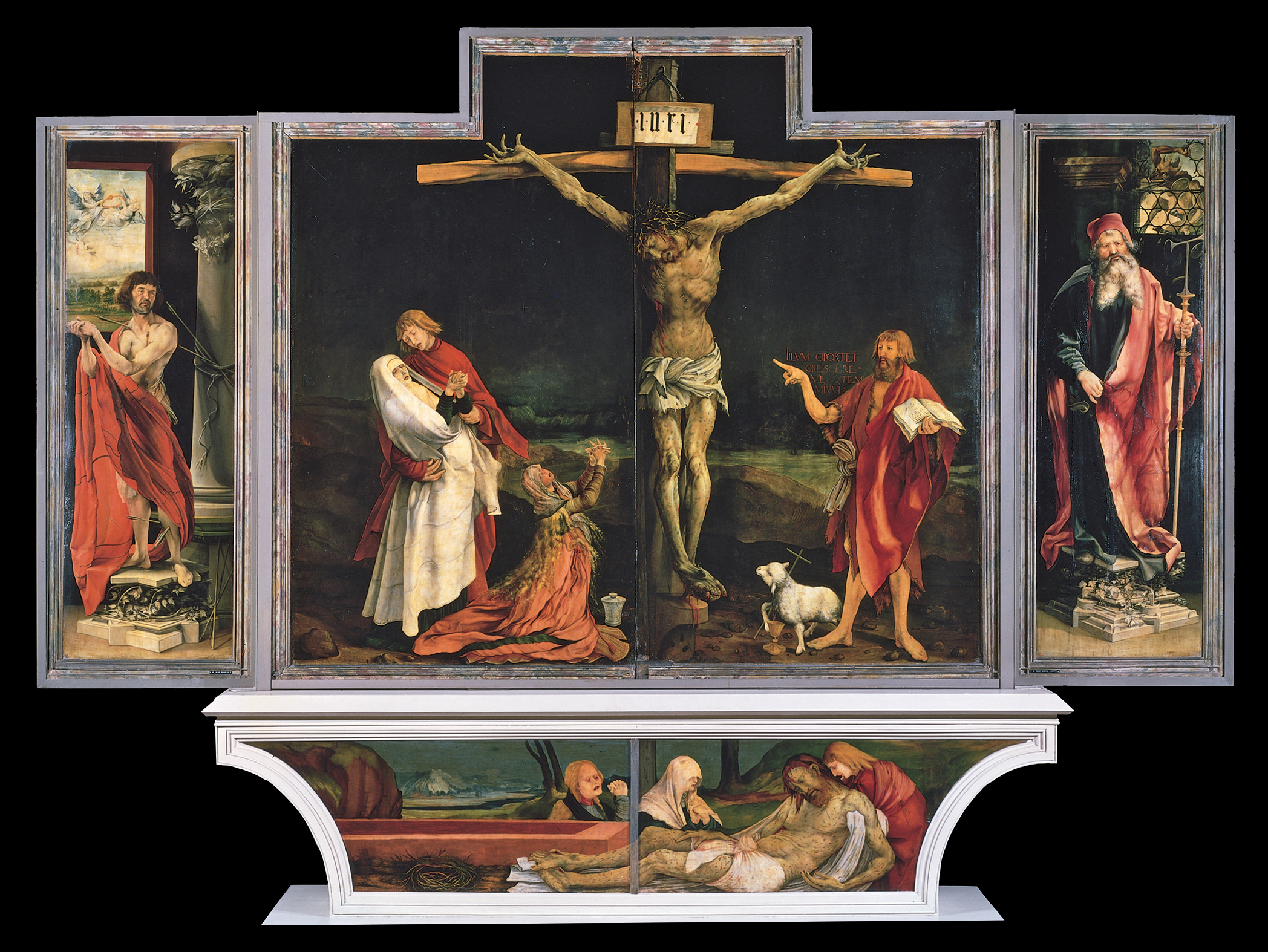
The Isenheim Altar, created by Matthias Grünewald in the early 16th century for the Antonine hospital and monastery in Isenheim. The work contains a number of references to Saint Anthony and Saint Anthony's fire

The congregation was founded c. 1095 by Gaston of Valloire, a nobleman of the Dauphiné, and his son, and confirmed by Pope Urban II in the same year, in thanksgiving for the son's miraculous cure from Saint Anthony's fire thanks to the relics of Saint Anthony the Great.

The relics were housed in the church of Saint Anthony at La-Motte-Saint-Didier (the present Saint-Antoine-l'Abbaye, Isère), to which was attached a Benedictine priory, whose members tended the shrine. Gaston and his community, which at this date was composed of laymen, set up a hospital nearby, where they cared for pilgrims to the shrine and for the sick, particularly those afflicted with Saint Anthony's fire, a disease very common in the Middle Ages, particularly among the poor. Relations with the resident Benedictines were not good, however, and conflicts were frequent.

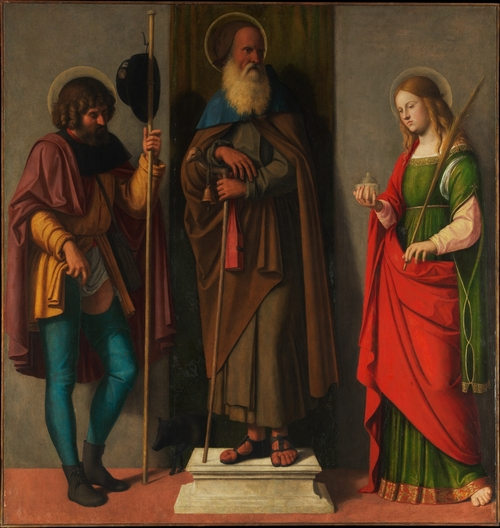
Saints Roch, Anthony Abbot and Lucy, 1513, possibly commissioned for a community of the Hospital Brothers

The members of the community wore a black habit with the Greek letter Tau (also known as Saint Anthony's cross) in blue. At first laymen, they received sanction as a monastic order from Pope Honorius III in 1218. In 1248 they adopted the Rule of St. Augustine and were constituted canons regular by Pope Boniface VIII in 1297. At this time the conflict that had grown up between the Antonines and the Benedictine monks responsible for the relics had become severe: the Pope put an end to it by dismissing the Benedictines to Montmajour Abbey and giving custody of the shrine to the Antonines.

Due to the community's successes further hospitals were opened in Gap, Chambéry and Besançon, and later in Spain, Italy, Flanders and Germany, where one of their first monasteries and hospitals was opened in 1214 in Memmingen. The congregation spread still more during the 14th century, during which they also cared for those suffering from the Black Death, and at its height, in the 15th century, possessed about 370 hospitals. The congregation also produced a number of distinguished scholars and prelates. Among their privileges was that of caring for the sick of the papal household.

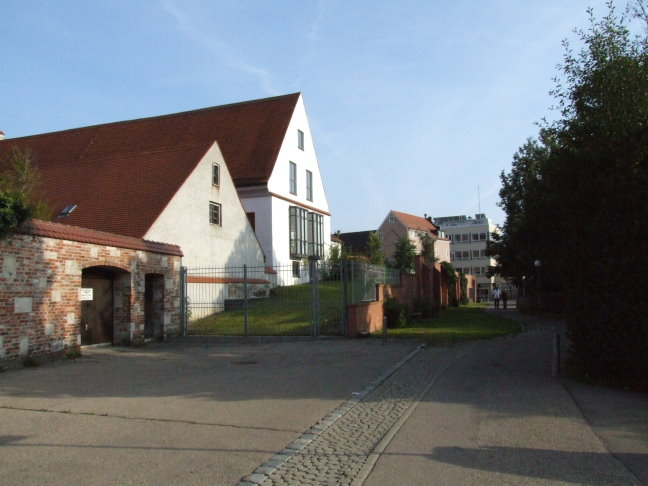
Former Antonine hospital in Memmingen, now a museum of the Order

Their beneficent activities attracted generous gifts and endowments, but their income declined significantly after the Reformation, and more particularly once the connection was finally made between Saint Anthony's Fire and the ergot fungus, and the incidence of the affliction fell sharply. In 1616 a reform was ordained and partially carried out. In 1777 the congregation, hugely reduced, was canonically united with the Knights of Malta. Only a tiny number of houses remained open, and the remnants of the order were finally suppressed in the French Revolution and the years immediately following. The last few German houses were dissolved during the secularisation of 1803.

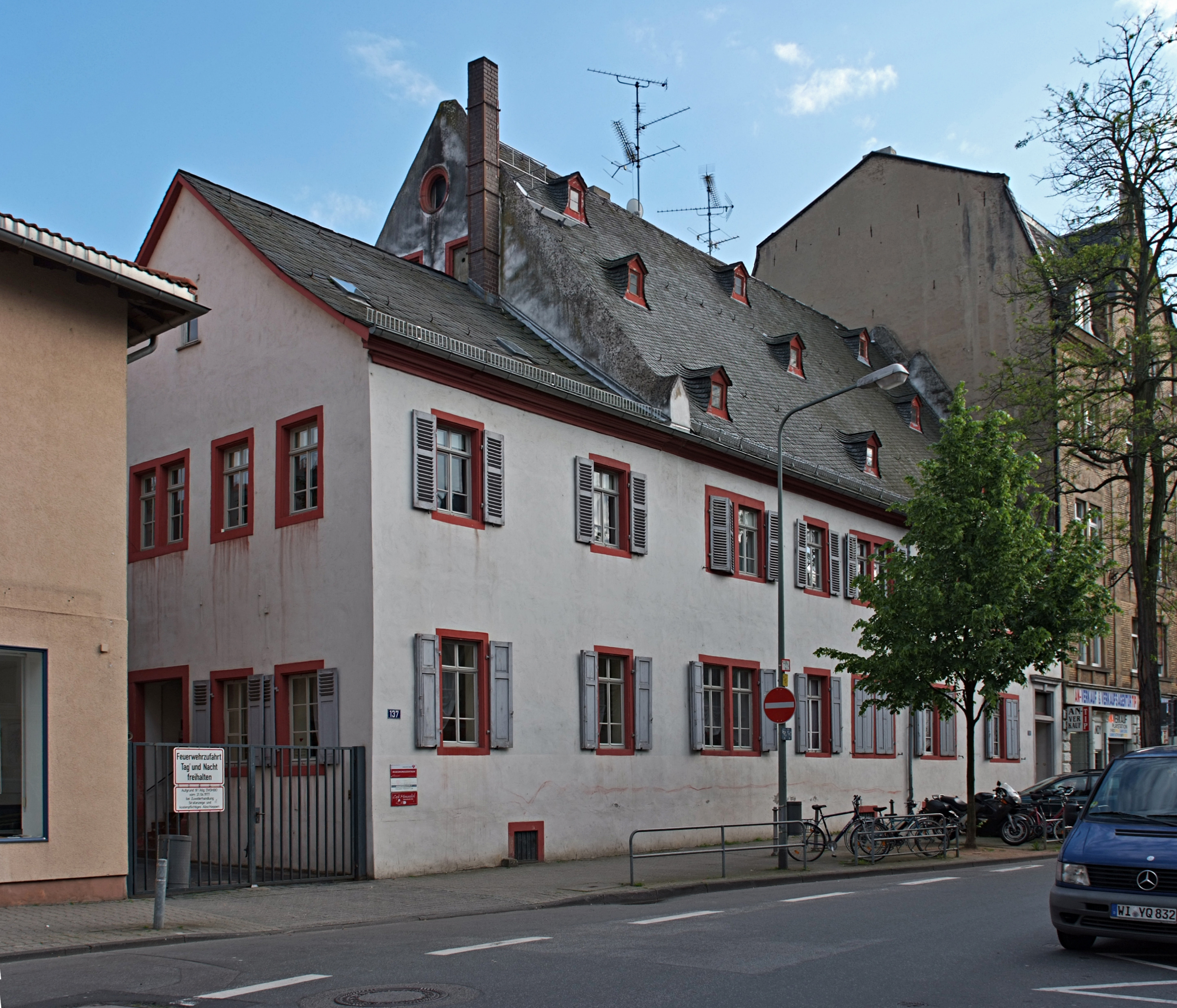
Former Antonine hospital in Höchst, which closed in 1803, one of the last Antonine houses in existence

== List of houses ==
=== Denmark ===
- Mårkær Monastery

=== England ===
- St. Anthony's Hospital, St Benet Fink

== See also ==
- Anthonians

== References and sources ==
- Antonine Museum, Memmingen (in German)
- Œuvres Hospitalières Françaises de l'Ordre de Malte (in French)
- Catholic Encyclopedia: Orders of St. Anthony
- Sandell-Dupeley, Renée, 1988: Saint Antoine en Dauphiné. ccl éditions (in French)
