= Qiman al-Arus =

Qiman al-Arus قمن العروس Koma
- Location in Egypt
- Coordinates: 29°18′00″N 31°10′10″E
- Country: Egypt
- Governorate: Beni Suef

Population (2006)
  - Total: 28,246
- Time zone: UTC+2 (EET)
  - Summer (DST): UTC+3 (EEST)

Qiman al-Arus (Arabic: قمن العروس, Coptic: ⲧⲕⲉⲙⲏⲛ, Ancient Greek: Κομά, Komá) is a village in the Beni Suef Governorate of Egypt.

The city's name comes from Ancient Egyptian: Tꜣ-jꜣd.t-kꜣ-mn, lit. 'the-field-of-the-lasting(?)-bull'.

It is famed as the birthplace of St. Anthony, whose hagiography claimed his family was wealthy and owned sizable estates in the area in the early 3rd century AD.
