= Dionay =

- Part of Saint-Antoine-l'Abbaye
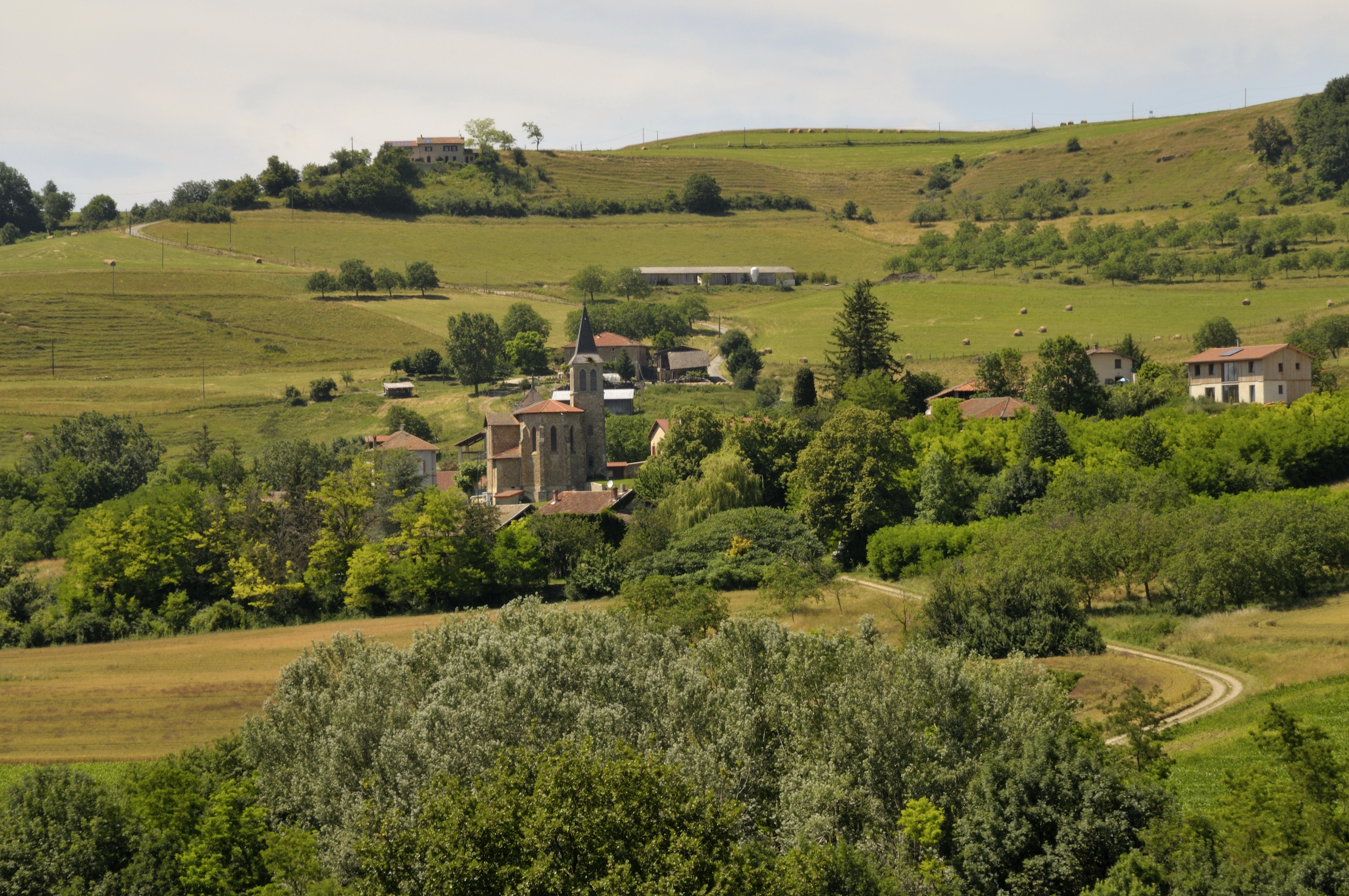
- Location of Dionay
- Location within France Location within Auvergne-Rhône-Alpes
- Coordinates: 45°12′14″N 5°13′14″E
- Country: France
- Region: Auvergne-Rhône-Alpes
- Department: Isère
- Arrondissement: Grenoble
- Canton: Le Sud Grésivaudan
- Commune: Saint-Antoine-l'Abbaye
- Area^{1}: 14.01 km^{2} (5.41 sq mi)
- Elevation: 520 m (1,710 ft)
- Highest elevation: 625 m (2,051 ft)
- Lowest elevation: 392 m (1,286 ft)
- Population (2019): 113
  - Density: 8.07/km^{2} (20.9/sq mi)
- Time zone: UTC+01:00 (CET)
  - Summer (DST): UTC+02:00 (CEST)
- Postal code: 38160
- ^{1} French Land Register data, which excludes lakes, ponds, glaciers > 1 km^{2} (0.386 sq mi or 247 acres) and river estuaries.

Dionay (French pronunciation: [djɔnɛ]) is a former commune in the Isère department in southeastern France. On 31 December 2015, it was merged into the new commune of Saint-Antoine-l'Abbaye.

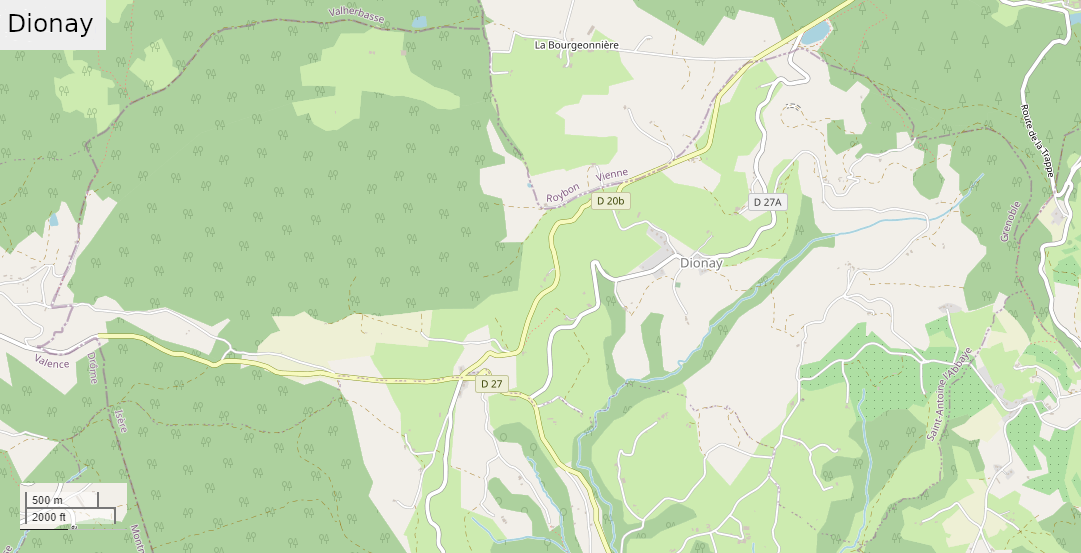
OpenStreetMap of Dionay, 2021

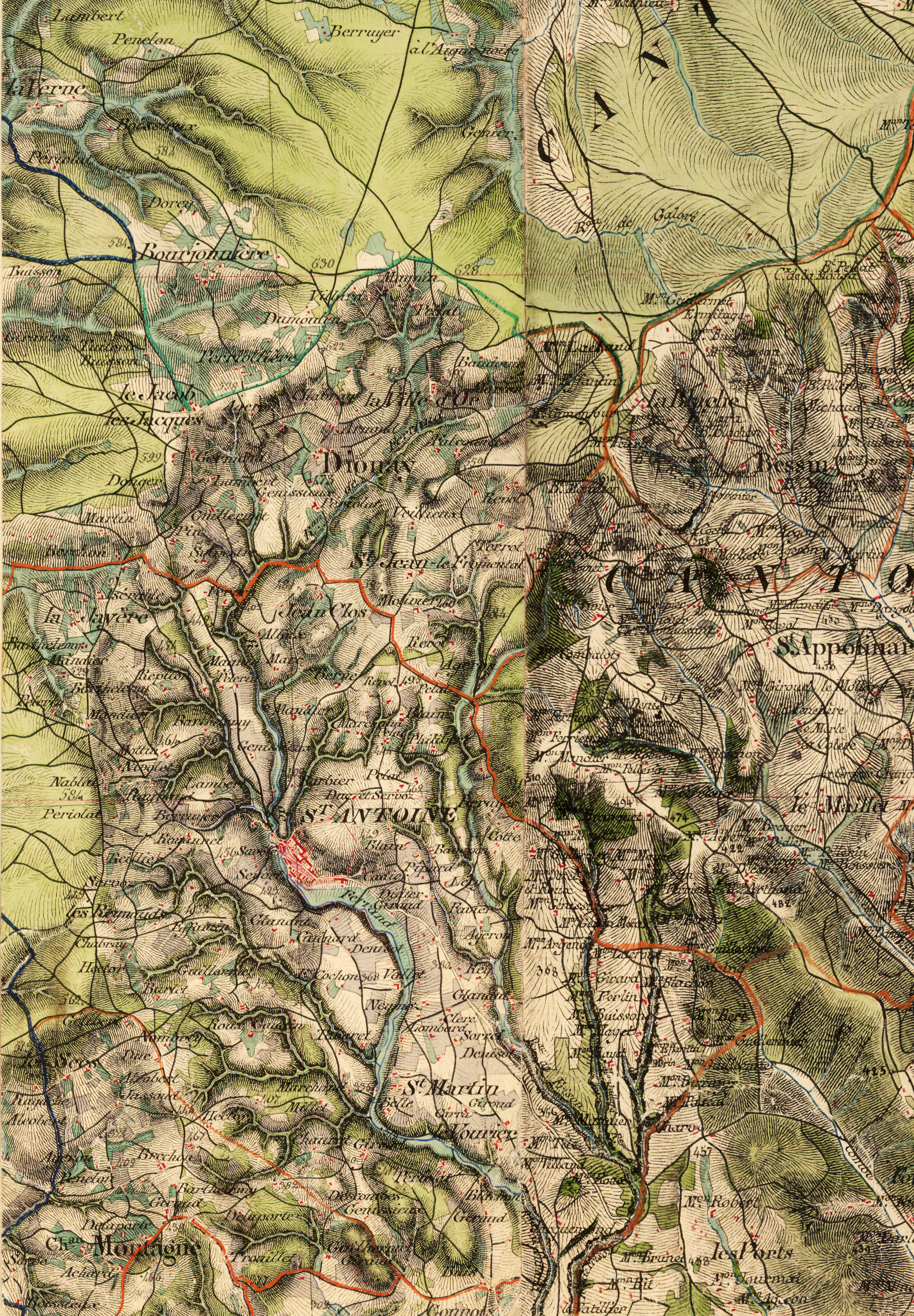
Dionay, old military map, 1866

== Twin towns ==
Dionay is twinned with:

- Sermoneta, Italy, since 2007

== See also ==
- Communes of the Isère department
