= Abbey church of Saint-Antoine-l'Abbaye =

Abbatial church located in Isère, in France

- Abbatiale de Saint-Antoine-l'Abbaye
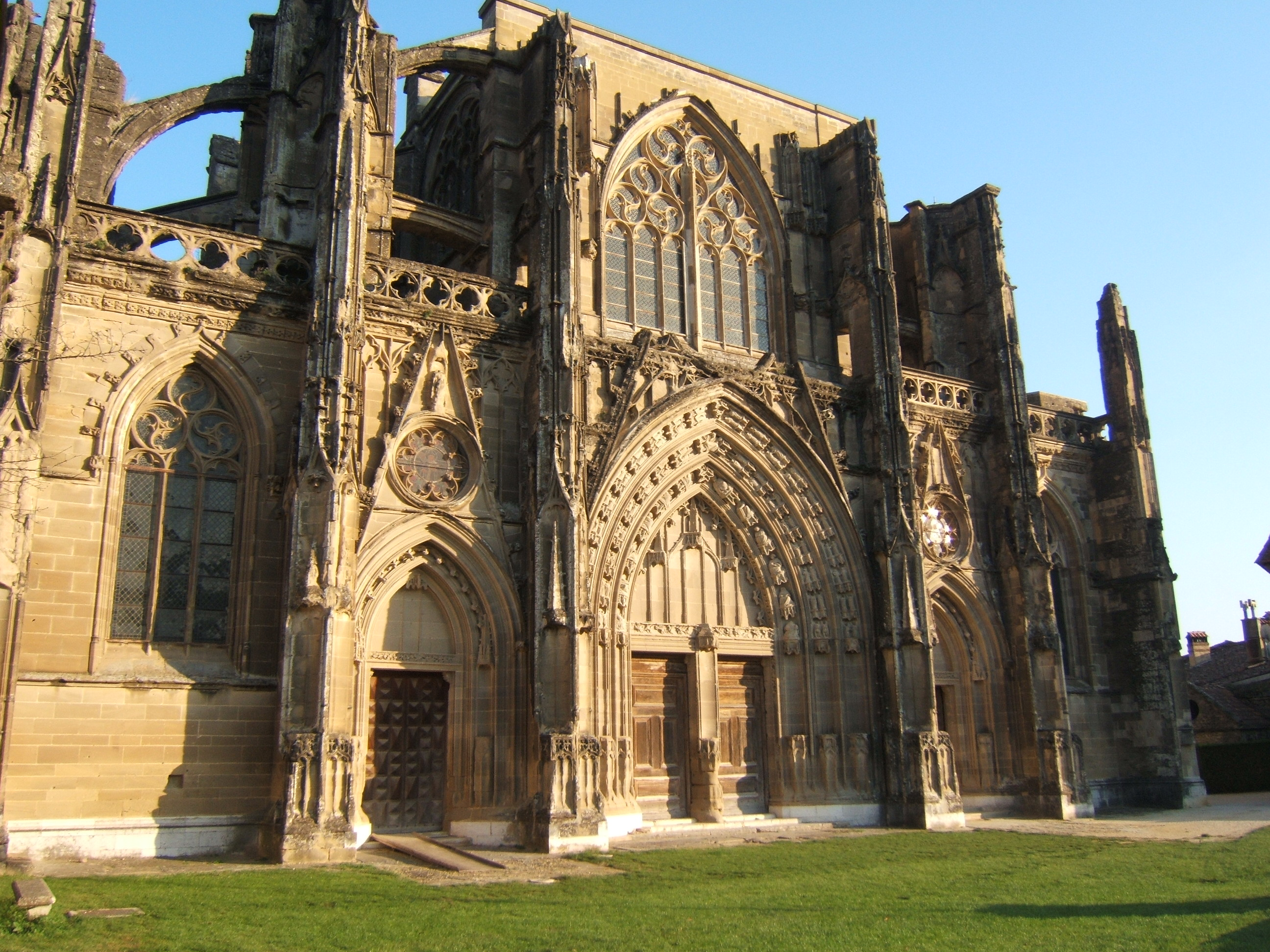
- Abbey church of Saint-Antoine-l'Abbaye
- Abbey church of Saint-Antoine-l'Abbaye
- 45°10′34″N 5°12′58″E
- Location: Saint-Antoine-l'Abbaye
- Country: France
- Denomination: Roman Catholic Church
- Website: www.isere-tourisme.com/patrimoine-culturel/eglise-abbatiale-de-saint-antoine-labbaye

History
- Status: Abbey church

Architecture
- Functional status: Active
- Heritage designation: Monument historique
- Architectural type: church
- Style: French Gothic
- Groundbreaking: c. 1280
- Completed: 1490

Administration
- Archdiocese: Roman Catholic Diocese of Grenoble-Vienne

Monument historique
- Official name: Abbatiale de Saint-Antoine-l'Abbaye
- Type: Église
- Designated: 1840

The abbey church is the church of the Abbey of Saint-Antoine-l'Abbaye in the village of Saint-Antoine-l'Abbaye, Isère, France. The abbey church was listed as a historical monument in 1840 by Prosper Mérimée.

== History ==
In the 11th century, the relics of Saint Anthony the Great were deposited in the church of La Motte-aux-Bois, located on the way to Saint-Jacques-de-Compostelle. Little by little, pilgrims flocked in, attracted by the saint's reputation as a healer. In 1280, the construction of a Gothic church began, a church that would last 200 years (until the end of the 15th century).

In 1337, the construction of the great church resumed after a break of more than 47 years, thanks to a bequest from his brother Ponce Mitte which enabled the chevet to be completed around 1342. This explains the change of style in the church from the triumphal arch.

Construction continued steadily along the entire length of the building towards the façade. Work on the last two bays of the nave and the side aisles were carried out between 1343 and 1362. The fourth bay of the nave was built between 1389 and 1417. In 1400, the vaulting of the nave began.

Wall paintings are made in the church. The oldest mention of a painted decoration dates from 1383. The second chapel to the north was founded by the Abbot Gérenton de Châteauneuf, around 1400. There is a set of mural paintings where Saint Christopher is depicted on the west wall, and on the east side a Crucifixion with the donor presented by Saint Anthony with Saint Michael, weigher of souls, whose balance leans to the right, on the side of bad deeds. Above are depicted scenes from the life of Saint Anthony and the hermit Saint Paul.

Jean Robert, architect of the castle of Tarascon, was architect of the great church in 1419. The architecture of the nave shows that the work on the nave suffered a halt at the third span. The last three spans were probably built under Abbot Humbert de Brion, elected in 1438, whose coat of arms can be seen on the keystone.

A fire destroyed the bell tower and the roof made in 1422. The penultimate northern buttress was built in 1428.

A sculptor from Avignon, Antoine Le Moiturier, worked in the abbey between 1461 and 1464. The realization of the sculptures of the portals of the western facade was attributed to him, but a stylistic analysis casts doubt over this assertion. He may have made one of the many altarpieces that were in the side chapels that were destroyed during the Wars of Religion. The portals were eventually completed in the middle of the 15th century. They are closer to those of the portals of the Saint-Maurice cathedral in Vienne than to the angels of the Charterhouse of Champmol. The last side chapel was completed in 1484. The hard stone paving was put in place in 1490.

The stained glass windows were installed at the end of the 15th century. The covering of the roof in colored and glazed tiles was laid between 1482 and 1490.

The side chapels were built by founders and benefactors. They were planned on the initial plan of the church but their completion, fenestration, and ornamentation were left to their founders. It is this initiative of the founders and benefactors which explains the differences in style between these chapels and the rest of the church. The first acts of foundation date from the middle of the 14th century.

Like all the churches in Dauphiné, the abbey and the church of Notre-Dame de l'Hôpital were destroyed during the Wars of Religion. The occupation of 1567 was more serious because the roof and the bell tower were burnt down. The old glazed tile roof has disappeared as well as the spire of the bell tower. The façade is decapitated and deprived of its frame of flying buttresses.

Restoration work began in 1593 with the roof, then with the high windows in 1605. The abbey was cleaned. In his History of Dauphiné written in 1670, the historian Nicolas Chorier points out that the walls had been whitewashed a few years earlier. The walls of the side chapels were pierced to establish a circulation corridor.

In the 17th century, the effort was made on the decoration of the abbey. The 87 stalls of the carpenter François Hanard, known as Jamet de Lyon, were installed in 1630. A new shrine of Saint Anthony covered with embossed silver plaques was donated in 1648 by Jean du Vache, baron of Châteauneuf d'Albenc. Jérémie Carlin's organs were placed around 1680 on a gallery built in 1639. They were transported in 1806 to the Saint-Louis church in Grenoble before returning to the abbey church in 1990–1992. The black marble high altar by Jacques Mimerel, a sculptor from Lyon, was commissioned in 1667.

Large paintings were commissioned in 1690 from the painter Marc Chabry, painter from the city of Lyon, to decorate the chapels. In 1623, the conventual chapter commissioned Léonard de Vialeys, upholsterer in Aubusson, to create a suite of ten pieces representing the Story of Joseph, which were placed in the choir.

Restorations were undertaken from 1844 and throughout the 19th century to repair damage done during the Revolution, which was less harmful than during the Wars of Religion. They tried to restore a state prior to the damage of the Wars of Religion. New windows are installed.

== Architecture ==
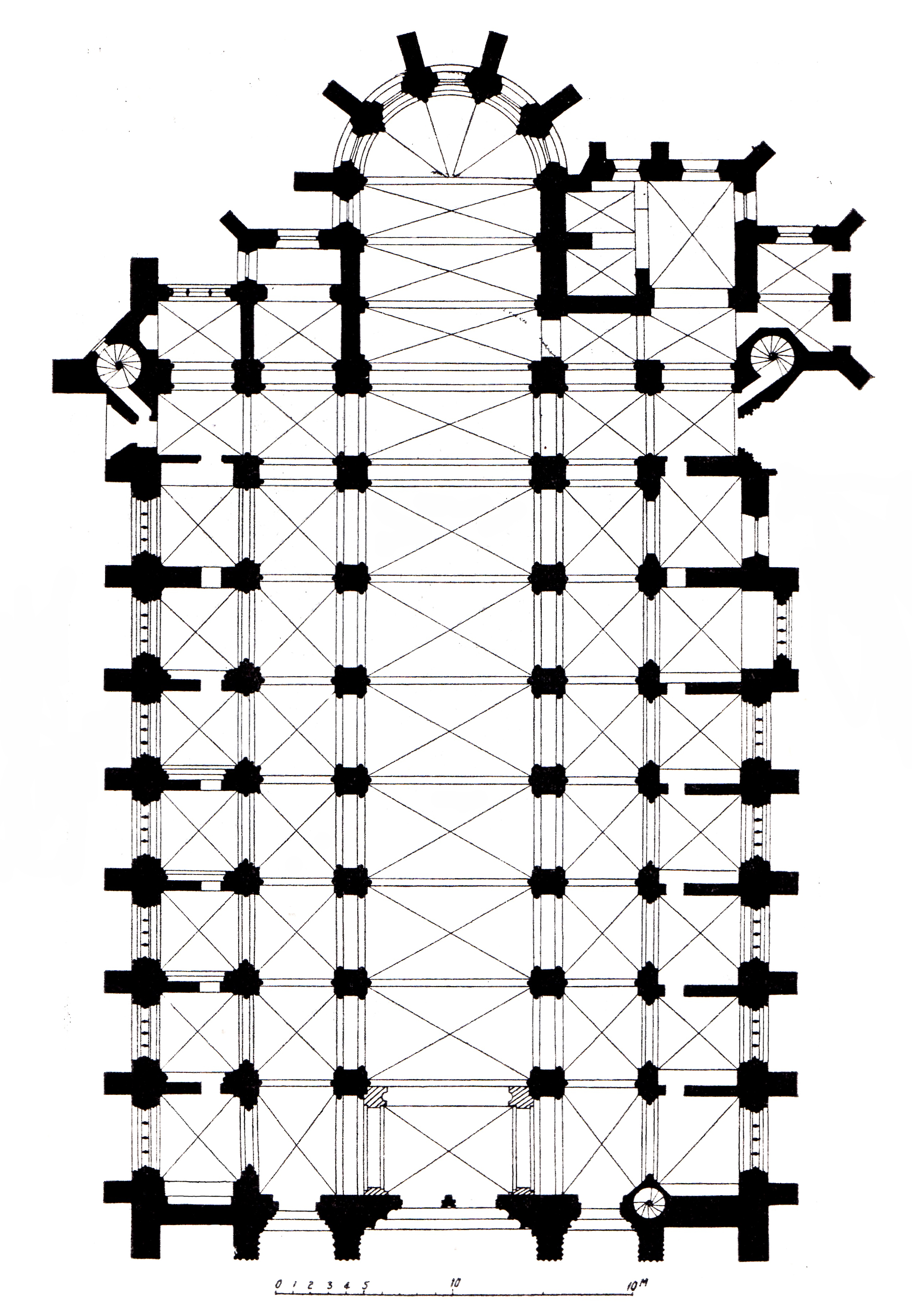
Map of the abbey church of Saint-Antoine-l'Abbaye

The interior architecture indicates that it was modeled on that of northern France (see plan of the church).

The lower part of the chevet, probably the beginning of an older building, is semicircular, but, from the first floor, the apse is five-sided. A triforium was built above the relief arches. The apse continues with the two straight spans of the choir. The choir is covered with three ribbed vaults, the first two bays have am oblong plan and the third rests on eight common branches with the apse.

The triumphal arch is at the limit between the choir and a narrow, non-projecting transept of which two towers were to load the extremities, but of which only the northern one was started. Each of the braces gives access to two square chapels to the east. Those on the south side were enlarged by the construction of the sacristy, in the 14th century, and the Chapel of Consolation, from the 15th century.

The seven-bay nave is flanked by side aisles onto which open the square side chapels.

The choir has a three-storey elevation. The architect who built the nave keeping the same elevation. The same cord separates the floors. The general layout has been retained:

- triforium on the first floor, with twin arcades in the choir, with small columns and capitals from the 13th century, and with tri-twin arcades in the nave,
- circulation gallery piercing the thick formers, at the level of the upper windows, double in the apse, triple in the nave, which were probably redone after the wars of religion, in the 17th century.

The ribbed vaults are quadripartite. The thrust of the vaults is taken up by buttresses. In the nave, they are supported by rectangular piers confined by half-columns taking up the fallout from the transverse arches and large arcades.

The flamboyant façade is flat against the nave. It includes three portals surmounted by a balustrade. Taking up a layout of the Saint-Maurice cathedral in Vienne, above the median portal was placed a flamboyant bay.
