= Mårkær Monastery =

Monastery in Germany

Coordinates: 54°40′0″N 9°42′46″E

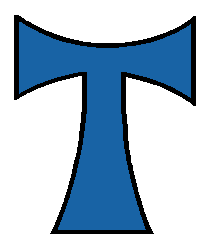
Cross of the Order of the Hospital Brothers of St. Anthony

Mårkær Monastery (Danish: Mårkær Kloster) was an establishment of the Hospital Brothers of St. Anthony, a religious order. It was located at Mårkær, Angeln, Southern Schleswig.

Mårkær is now within Germany, under the name of Mohrkirch. Nevertheless, the monastery was throughout its existence within the Duchy of Schleswig, a hereditary possession of the Danish crown, and was therefore Danish not German.

Mårkær Monastery was founded in 1391, as a daughter monastery of Tempzin Monastery, in Kloster Tempzin, Duchy of Mecklenburg. It was the first such establishment by the Hospital Brothers of St. Anthony in any of the Nordic countries. They were a medical order, who specialised in treating sufferers from the condition called St. Anthony's Fire (now generally thought to be ergotism).

In 1470, King Christian I of Denmark (1426-1481) gave the Church of the Virgin Mary in Præstø to Mårkær Monastery. In 1472, the monks established a daughter monastery of their own in Præstø. His queen, Dorothea (1430/1431-1495), bequeathed 300 gulden to Mårkær Monastery. The monastery continued to prosper.

In 1535, the monastery was dissolved as a consequence of the Reformation. Its property passed to the Duke of Schleswig. The last surviving buildings of the monastery at Mårkær were demolished in 1780, and no trace or visual representation of them has survived.

To this day, the coat of arms of Mårkær/Mohrkirch includes the blue cross of the Hospital Brothers of St. Anthony.
