= Saint Antoine l'Abbaye =

- Commune
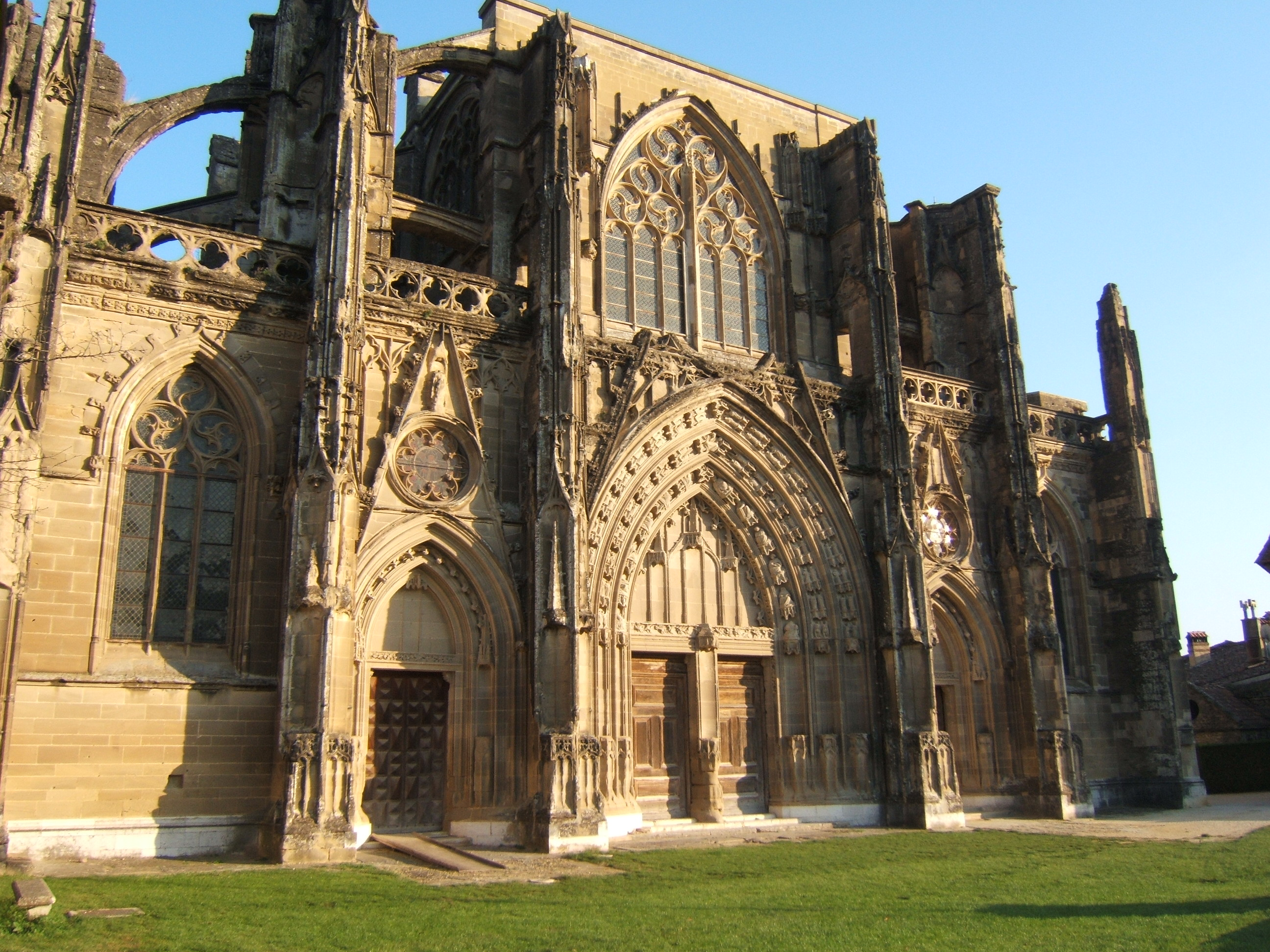
- Abbey church

- Coat of arms
- Location of Saint Antoine l'Abbaye
- Location within France Location within Auvergne-Rhône-Alpes
- Coordinates: 45°10′33″N 5°13′02″E
- Country: France
- Region: Auvergne-Rhône-Alpes
- Department: Isère
- Arrondissement: Grenoble
- Canton: Le Sud Grésivaudan

Government
  - Mayor (2022–2026): Maryline Longis
- Area^{1}: 36.22 km^{2} (13.98 sq mi)
- Elevation: 365 m (1,198 ft)
- Highest elevation: 578 m (1,896 ft)
- Lowest elevation: 274 m (899 ft)
- Population (2023): 1,263
  - Density: 34.87/km^{2} (90.31/sq mi)
- Time zone: UTC+01:00 (CET)
  - Summer (DST): UTC+02:00 (CEST)
- INSEE/Postal code: 38359 /38160
- ^{1} French Land Register data, which excludes lakes, ponds, glaciers > 1 km^{2} (0.386 sq mi or 247 acres) and river estuaries.

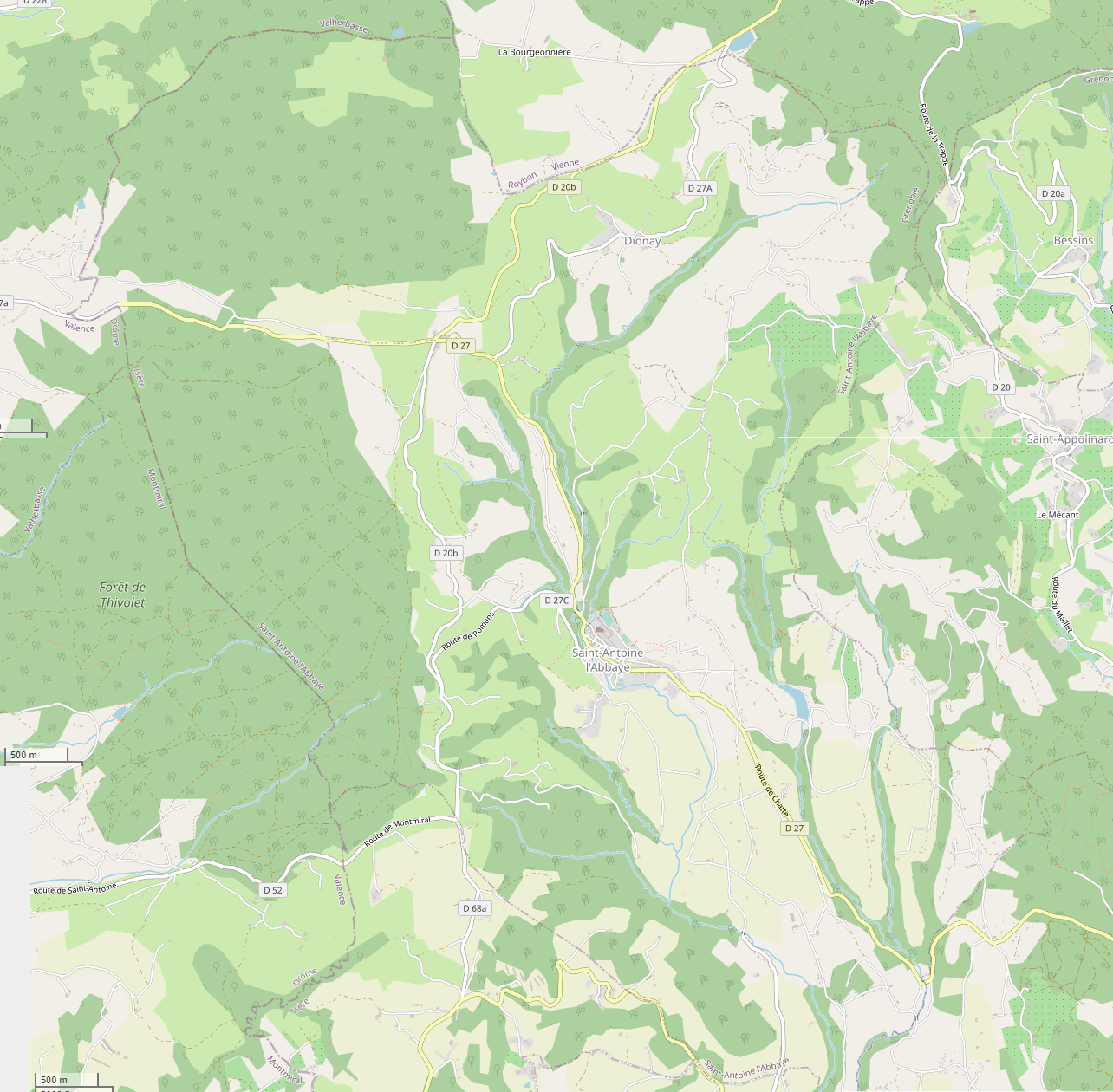
Saint Antoine l'Abbaye, the new commune, OpenStreetMap, 2021

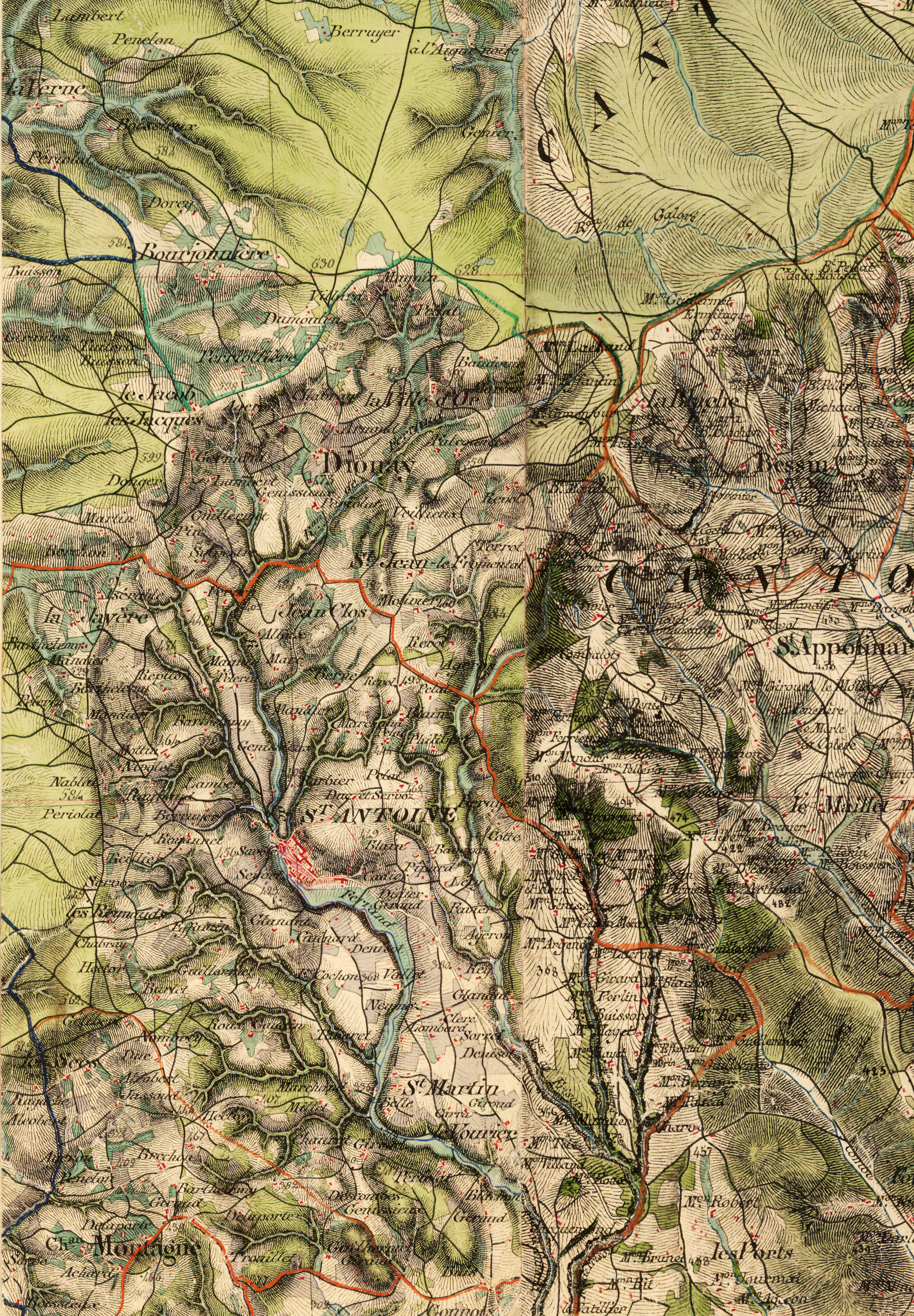
Saint Antoine l'Abbaye, old military map, 1866

Saint Antoine l'Abbaye (French pronunciation: [sɛ̃.t‿ɑ̃twan labei], before 1991: Saint-Antoine), also Saint-Antoine-en-Viennois, is a commune in the Isère department in southeastern France. On 31 December 2015 the former commune of Dionay was merged into Saint Antoine l'Abbaye.

Formerly known as La-Motte-Saint-Didier, it was renamed after becoming the home of purported relics of Saint Anthony the Great in the 11th century, and shortly afterwards of the original house of the Hospital Brothers of St. Anthony, founded here in 1095 as the result of miraculous cures from St. Anthony's Fire ascribed to the relics.

It was established as a Benedictine community, with monks responsible for the care of the shrine and its relics, while the Brothers tended to those suffering from St. Anthony’s fire, a condition common at the time. Over the course of the next two centuries, disputes between the Antonines and the Benedictines arose repeatedly. The Antonines were formed into an Order of canons regular in 1297. At that time the Benedictine monks were removed from the shrine, which was entrusted to the Antonines. In 1890, the Canons Regular of the Immaculate Conception were given the Abbey of St. Antony, which was the motherhouse of the congregation. It maintained that role from 1890 until 1903, when, following the anti-clerical laws passed by the French government in 1901, the community was transferred to Andora, in the Italian region of Liguria.

In July 2025, an annual France 2 series, "Le Village préféré des Français", named the village as most popular amongst the French.

== Geography ==
The town is situated on the right bank of the Furand River, on a molasse formation resulting from the Alpine orogeny. The town's main monuments (notably the abbey buildings and the town hall) make extensive use of this rock, which is well-suited to sculpture.

== Monuments ==
Since 2009, the village has been a member of Les Plus Beaux Villages de France (The Most Beautiful Villages of France) Association and hosts many monuments, the most important of which are the Abbey Church and the abbey.

== Population ==
Population data refer to the area corresponding with the commune as of January 2025.

Historical population
| Year | Pop. | ±% p.a. |
|---|---|---|
| 1968 | 987 | — |
| 1975 | 894 | −1.40% |
| 1982 | 903 | +0.14% |
| 1990 | 976 | +0.98% |
| 1999 | 1,017 | +0.46% |
| 2007 | 1,094 | +0.92% |
| 2012 | 1,158 | +1.14% |
| 2017 | 1,155 | −0.05% |
| 2023 | 1,263 | +1.50% |
Source: INSEE

== Mayors ==
| From | Until | Name |
|---|---|---|
| 1816 | November 1830 | André Ferdinand Génissieu |
| November 1830 | | Pierre Désiré Vivier |
| | around 1831 | Jean Pierre Baudoin |
| 1837 | 1846 | Joseph Mathieu Sorrel (1797–1847) |
| | around 1847 | Gustave Henry Aimé Jacques Guyon (1810–1859) |
| | around 1849 | Candide Hypolite Glandert (1797–1860) |
| 1852 | August 1860 | Jean Baptiste Joachim Giraud (1816–1872) |
| August 1860 | April 1867 | Armand Génissieu |
| June 1867 | September 1870 | Jean Baptiste Joachim Giraud (1816–1872) |
| September 1870 | January 1878 | Jules Vignal |
| February 1878 | June 1879 | Ferdinand Lassara (1811–1888) |
| June 1879 | November 1885 | Maurice Cyrille Ginier (1825–1885) |
| January 1886 | May 1896 | Eugène Benjamin Germain (1849–1900) |
| May 1896 | March 1900 | Hippolyte Chaloin (1835–1900) |
| June 1900 | May 1908 | Pierre Fleury Roux (1846–1913) |
| May 1908 | January 1923 | Aimé Dupeley |
| 1935 | December 1943 | Ferdinand Xavier Gilibert (1887–1945) |
| | March 2001 | André Suisse |
| March 2001 | December 2015 | Marie-Chantal Jolland |
For the new commune, which is a distinct administrative entity:
| From | Until | Name |
| January 2016 | on going | Marie-Chantal Jolland |

== Twin towns ==
Saint Antoine l'Abbaye is twinned with:

- Sermoneta, Italy, since 2007

== See also ==
- Communes of the Isère department
