= Reinberg =

- Ortsteil of Sundhagen
- Interactive map of Reinberg
- Location within Germany Location within Mecklenburg-Vorpommern
- Coordinates: 54°13′N 13°15′E
- Country: Germany
- State: Mecklenburg-Vorpommern
- District: Vorpommern-Rügen
- Town: Sundhagen

Area
  - Total: 25.14 km^{2} (9.71 sq mi)
- Elevation: 0.5 m (1.6 ft)

Population (2015)
  - Total: 652
  - Density: 25.9/km^{2} (67.2/sq mi)
- Time zone: UTC+01:00 (CET)
  - Summer (DST): UTC+02:00 (CEST)
- Postal codes: 18519
- Dialling codes: 038328
- Vehicle registration: NVP
- Website: www.reinberg.amt-miltzow.de

Reinberg is a village and a parish of the municipality of Sundhagen. It lies between Stralsund and Greifswald on the B 105 federal road in northeastern Germany. To the north the former municipality of Reinberg borders on the Strelasund. From the village of Stahlbrode that used to belong to it, there is a car ferry to the island of Rügen (Zudar peninsula).

== History ==
In 1220, construction began on the church, and in 1325 Reinberg was mentioned for the first time in the records.

On the dissolution of the Principality of Rügen in 1325, the village transferred to the Duchy of Pomerania.

From the end of the Thirty Years' War to the year 1815, the region belonged to Swedish Pomerania and thereafter to the Prussian Province of Pomerania.

Until 1952, Reinberg was part of the district of Grimmen within the Bezirk of Rostock to 1994. Since 1990 it has also bee part of the state of Mecklenburg-Vorpommern.

On 7 June 2009, the hitherto independent municipality of Reinsberg merged with those of Behnkendorf, Brandshagen, Horst, Kirchdorf, Miltzow and Wilmshagen to form the new municipality of Sundhagen. The former municipality consists of the villages of Oberhinrichshagen, Falkenhagen, Dömitzow and Stahlbrode.

== Sights ==
Amongst the sights of Reinberg are its Gothic village church, the murder stone monument on the cemetery wall that dates to the 15th century, and the Reinberg Lime, which was the largest tree in Germany in the 19th century. The age of the tree is around 1,000 years. It is possible that the lime had been planted before the foundation and consecration of the church. Near the tree is the grave of the father of surgeons, Theodor Billroth.

The murder stone has a kneeling figure with hands clasped, next to Christ on the cross. Above the cross, between two roses, are the initials "J.N.R.J." and the words: "domini miserere mei". The weathered inscription above the crucified Jesus probably originally ran: "orate pro ravno van barneko". It may also be read as "orate pro heyno van der beken", however there is no record of a van der Beken family. The princely councillor and Landvogt, Raven Barnekow, however, was sentenced to death and executed in Stralsund in 1453 as a result of false allegations. This suggests this expiatory cross (Sühnekreuz) was erected in his memory.

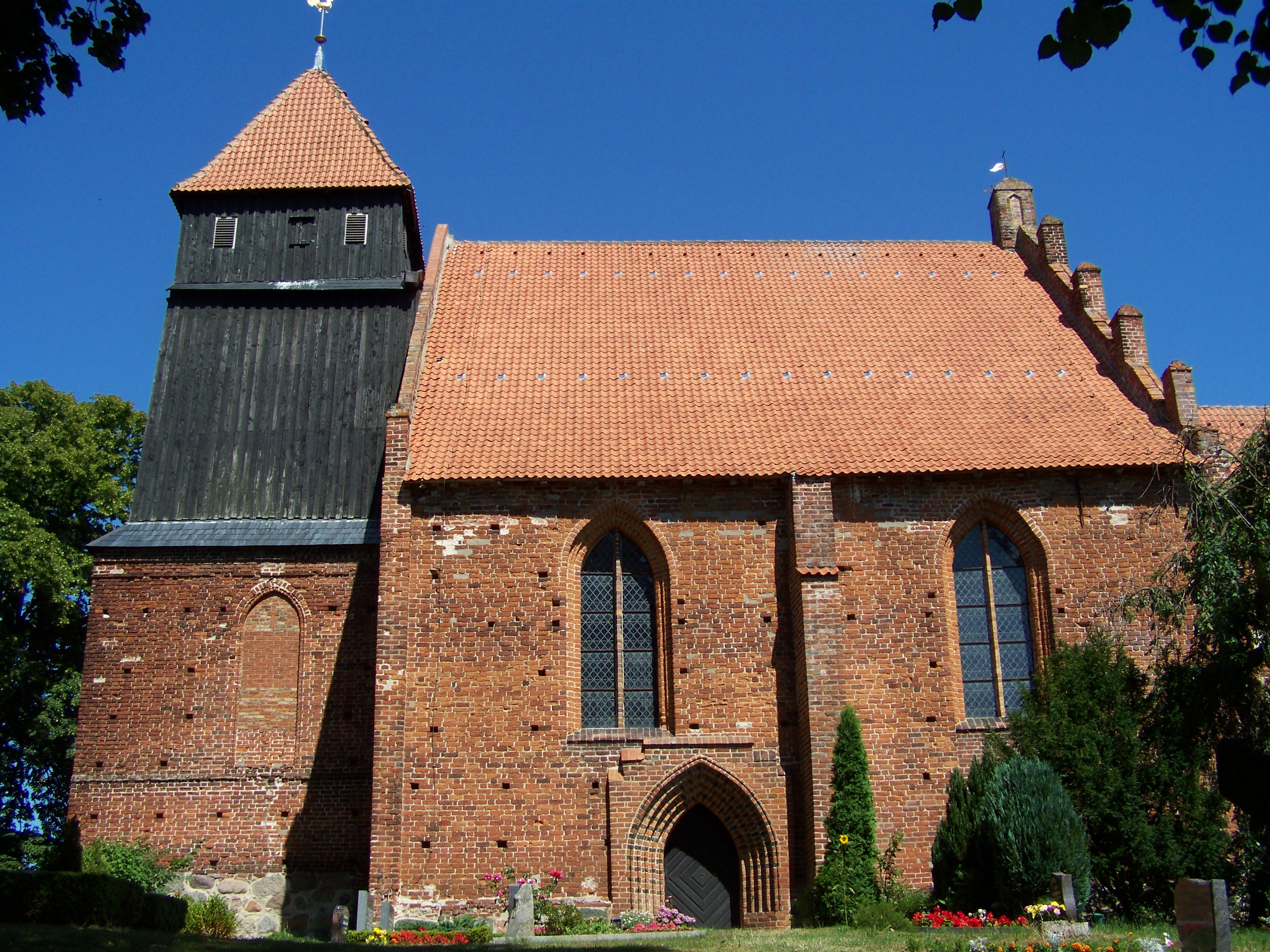
Village church

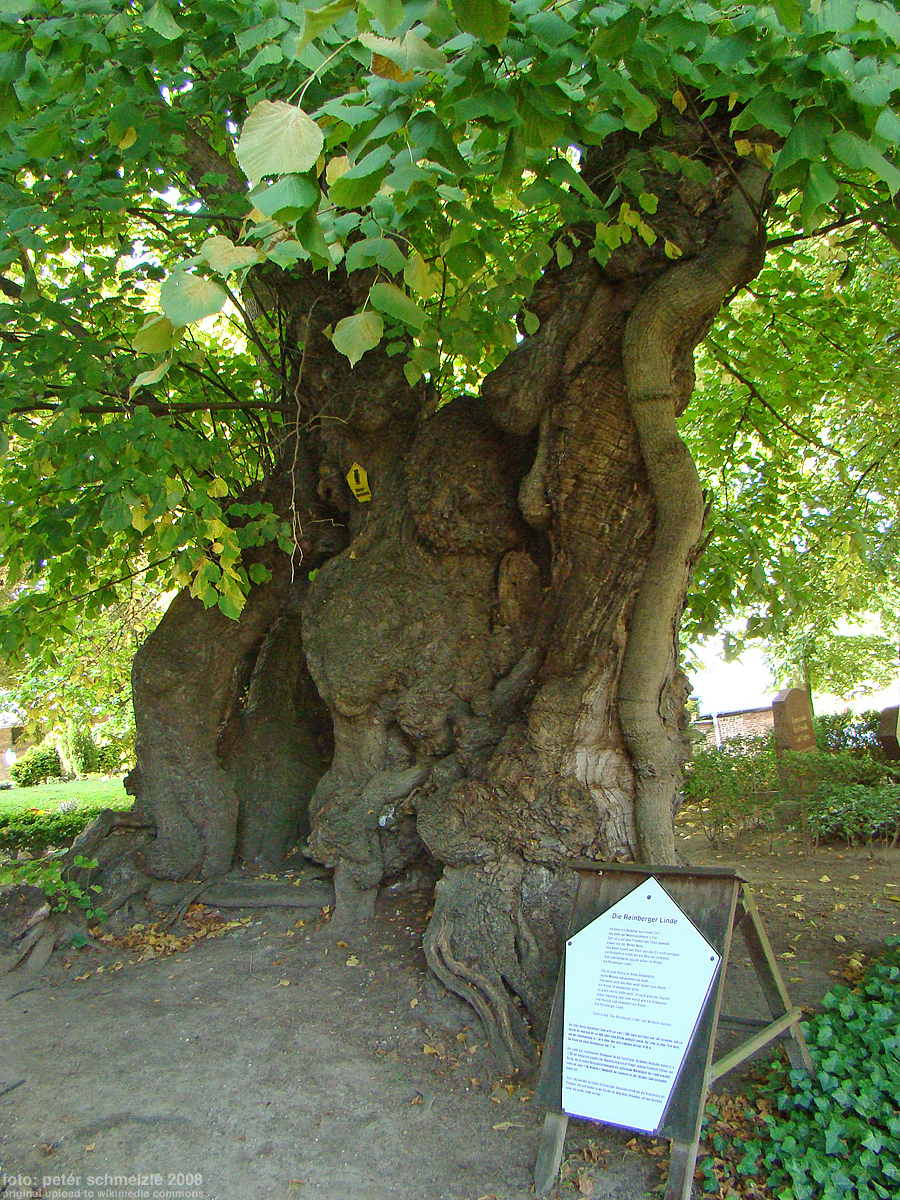
The Reinberg Lime

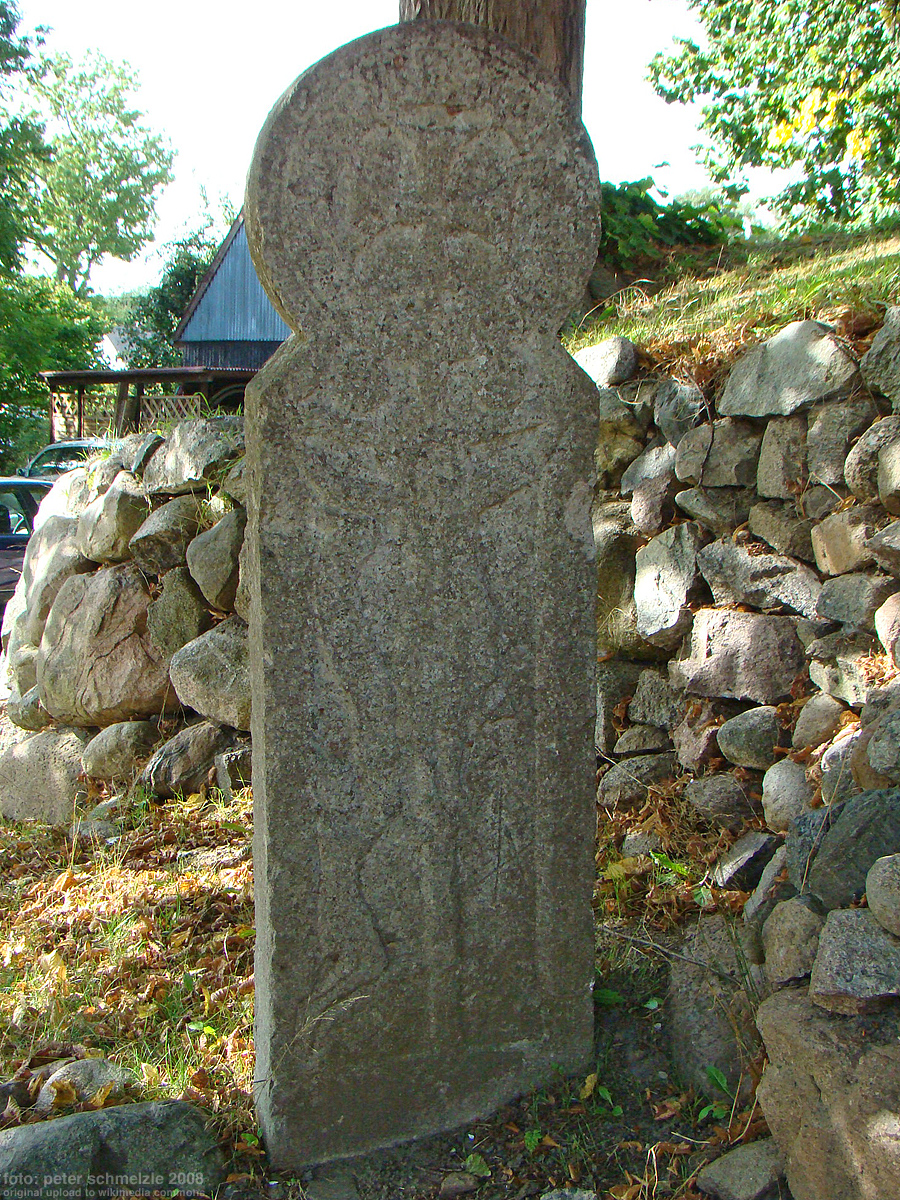
Sühnestein
