= Invasion of Rügen (1678) =

- Part of the Swedish-Brandenburg War and the Scanian War
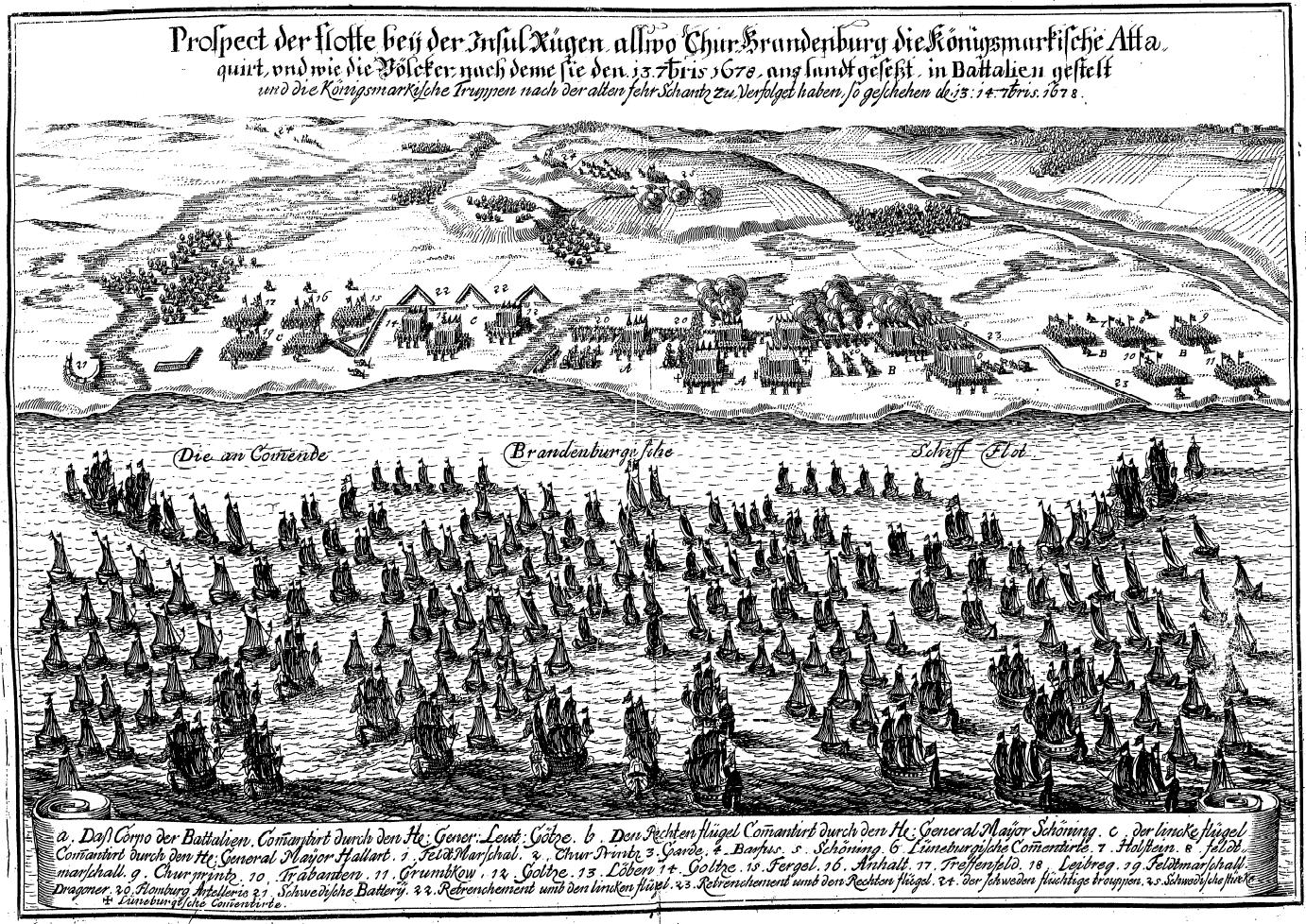
- The invasion fleet and the army in order of battle on 23 September 1678 near Neukamp
Date	22–24 September 1678
Location	Island of Rügen, Baltic Sea
Result	Dano–Brandenburgian victory
Territorial changes	Temporary recapture of Rügen

Belligerents
(yes) Swedish Empire	Brandenburg-Prussia; Denmark–Norway; Dutch Republic

Commanders and leaders
(Swedish Empire) Otto von Königsmarck	Frederick William; Georg von Derfflinger (Denmark–Norway) Niels Juel (Dutch Republic) Cornelis Tromp

Strength
2,700 men including: 1,900 mounted; 800 infantry soldiers	c. 9,000 men including: 7,240 Brandenburg troops; 1,800 Danes

The invasion of Rügen of 22 to 24 September 1678 was a military operation in the Swedish-Brandenburg War, or Scanian War, that ended with the annexation of the Swedish-ruled island of Rügen by the Allies – Brandenburg-Prussia and Denmark – for just under a year before it was restored by treaty to Sweden.

The operation was a prelude to the long-planned Siege of Stralsund that followed shortly thereafter.

== Background ==
The first invasion of Rügen in this war took place on 17 September 1677, when the Danes landed and succeeded, after the Battle of Bergen, in expelling the Swedes from the entire island. Soon after, the Swedes under the command of Field Marshal Otto Wilhelm von Konigsmark began moves to recapture the island, which proved successful when they won the Battle of Warksow on 18 January 1678.

The island was not safe for long in spite of this Swedish victory, mainly because the Danes made several raids on Rügen over the summer.

The possession of the island of Rügen was strategically important for both warring parties, as the side that controlled the island could also guarantee the supply of the most important fortress in Swedish Pomerania, namely the town of Stralsund located on the mainland coast. The possession of the island was thus a prerequisite for a successful conquest of the fortress of Stralsund, which was in Swedish hands, by the Allies of Brandenburg and Denmark.

== Invasion ==
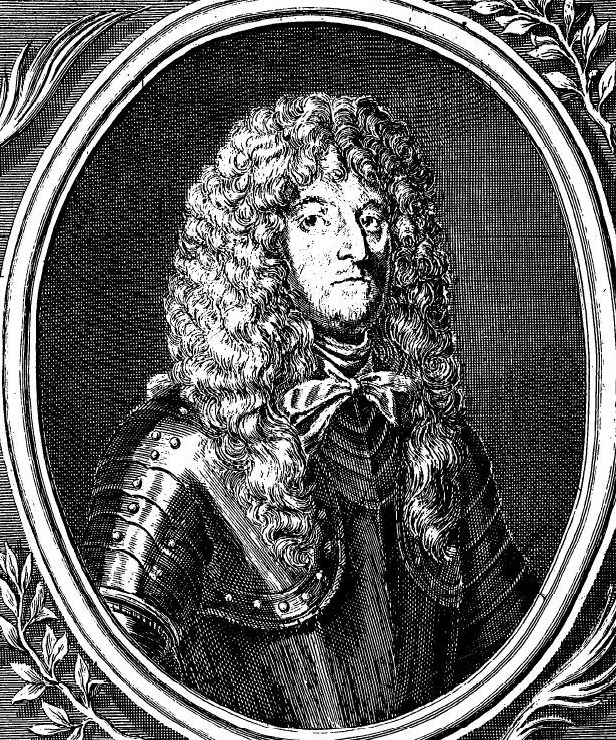
Swedish field marshal, Königsmarck

Denmark made a total of 27 warships available for the invasion, whose task was to protect the landing. In addition, Brandenburg had 10 warships at their disposal, seven of which were ships hired from Benjamin Raule (each with 107 cannon and 435-man crews) and three provided by the prince-elector himself.

A Brandenburg army had been standing by in Pomerania since mid-July 1678. The start of the operation was delayed by the late arrival, in August, of the Brandenburg squadron of warships under Benjamin Raule. In addition, Brandenburg required a lot of time to put together the required transport vessels. The transport fleet consisted of 210 large and 140 smaller ships.

Command of the navy was assumed by the Danish lieutenant admiral general, Nils Juel. The transport fleet was commanded by Admiral Cornelis Tromp. The command of the invasion force, the Brandenburg Corps, was held by General Field Marshal Derfflinger. The Brandenburg landing force had a strength of 1,440 cuirassiers, 300 dragoons and 5,500 infantry, a total of 7,240 men altogether. The Corps also had some field artillery: four 6-pounders and fourteen 3-pounders served by 76 men. The strength of the Danish landing force was 1,800 men.

The fleet assembled on the Stubber Bank in the Bay of Greifswald. The operational plan envisaged for a landing of the Danes in the north of the island and the Brandenburg troops to the south, so as to fragment the limited number of Swedish forces.

The Brandenburg Navy under the command of the Elector Frederick William weighed anchor on 22 September. In order to leave the Swedes as long as possible in the dark as to the landing site, the plan was to allow the fleet to turn around at Palmer Ort and, from there, to change course to a northeasterly direction toward Putbus, where the troops would go ashore.

When the fleet arrived, however, at Palmer Ort, the wind shifted to the northeast. The planned manoeuvre was no longer feasible. Added to this was that the Swedes had cannon posted on Zudar (the southernmost peninsula of Rügen) that now opened fire on the invasion fleet. In this critical situation, a cannonball struck close beside the Elector. Otherwise the damage was minimal. As the wind direction remained steady, the fleet had great difficulty sailing out of firing range of the Swedish artillery and dropped anchor to wait for more favourable winds.

That same day, the Danes under the command of Admiral Nils Juel, however, did succeed on 22 September in landing at Cape Arkona, at the fishing village of Vittorio. A small Swedish body of troops in front of the town tried to oppose the landing, but was pushed back to the Schaabe spit. In this small battle, the Danes lost 57 dead and 52 wounded. Swedish losses were higher. The Danes then barricaded themselves at the entrance of the narrow spit of Schaab. When the Swedish field marshal, Königsmarck, learned of the Danish landing, he ordered the immediate withdrawal of his troops, who were now in a hopeless situation, to Altefähr.

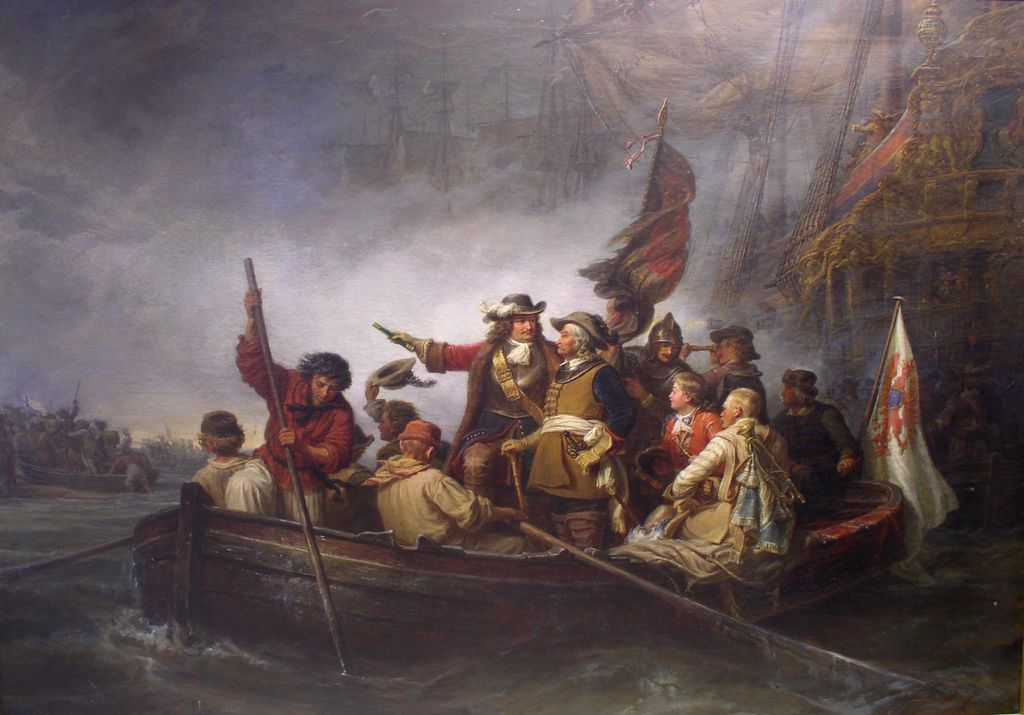
Contemporary painting of the Elector's arrival on Rügen

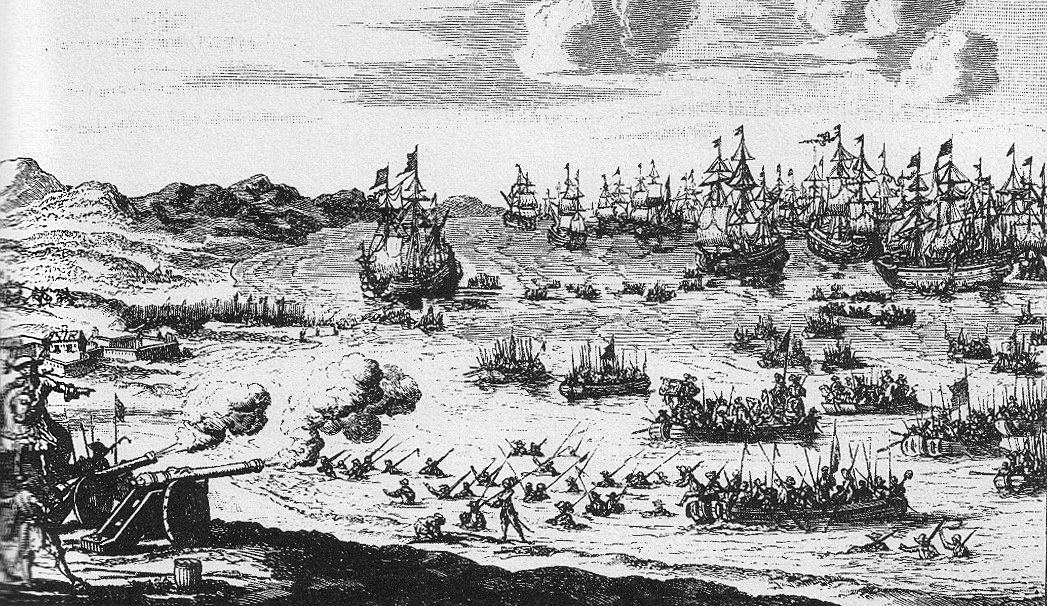
The bombardment by Swedish artillery of Brandenburg troops as they land on 23 September 1678 near Neukamp (by Jan Luiken)

The Elector, becoming impatient because of the Danish landing, ordered his troops to land at the nearest point, since based on his understanding (he knew nothing of the Swedish retreat), he feared that Sweden would concentrate their attack on the Danes. Thus, the Brandenburg force advanced overland to a point near Neukamp on 23 September 1678. Here there was a Swedish redoubt with eight guns and cavalry, which the invading troops engaged without success. When the growing number of Brandenburg troops brought their own cannon up and fired on the redoubt, the Swedes withdrew.

The landing force was completely ashore within two hours. In addition to the Elector, the Brandenburg field marshal, Derfflinger, was also on the spot.

The infantry that had landed earlier began at once, as previously practised, to construct chevaux de frise to protect themselves against an expected attack. The Swede Königsmarck, who had rushed over from the Zudar peninsula, retreated when he saw the Brandenburg army drawn up in full order of battle. In the subsequent pursuit of the Swedes by the Brandenburg cavalry, 200 Swedes were taken prisoner. Derfflinger and his cavalry took off in pursuit of the Swedes on the morning of 24 September. The latter had now reached Altefähr, where utter confusion broke out, as they all wanted to get to Stralsund. The Brandenburg cavalry took advantage of this opportunity and stormed the ramparts. In doing so, they managed to take over 700 prisoners and 250 warhorses, as well as all the cannon the Swedes possessed. Königsmarck succeeded with great difficulty in escaping, but many overcrowded boats sank during the crossing.

Likewise, Brandenburg easily captured the important Neufähr Redoubht. The personnel manning this redoubt consisted mainly of Danish and Brandenburg prisoners of war taken in January as a result of their defeat in the Battle of Warksow. These prisoners revolted against their Swedish officers and handed over the redoubt without a fight to the Brandenburg troops. The island was now once again in the possession of the Allies.

== Consequences ==
With the conquest of the island, the military fate of the Swedish fortress of Stralsund, now besieged by Brandenburg troops, was sealed. While Danish troops remained on the island, Brandenburg forces returned to the mainland to take part in the siege of Stralsund.

The Allies captured the fort after a heavy bombardment. As a result, half the town went up in flames and burned until 22 October 1678.

The island was given as promised to the Danes, who occupied it until the conclusion of the treaty. After the Treaty of Saint-Germain on 29 June 1679, the island was again returned to Sweden. The island itself was economically ruined thanks to the many battles and the large number of foreign troops, so that the Danish occupation troops had to be supplied from the Danish mainland until the end of the war.

== Commemoration ==
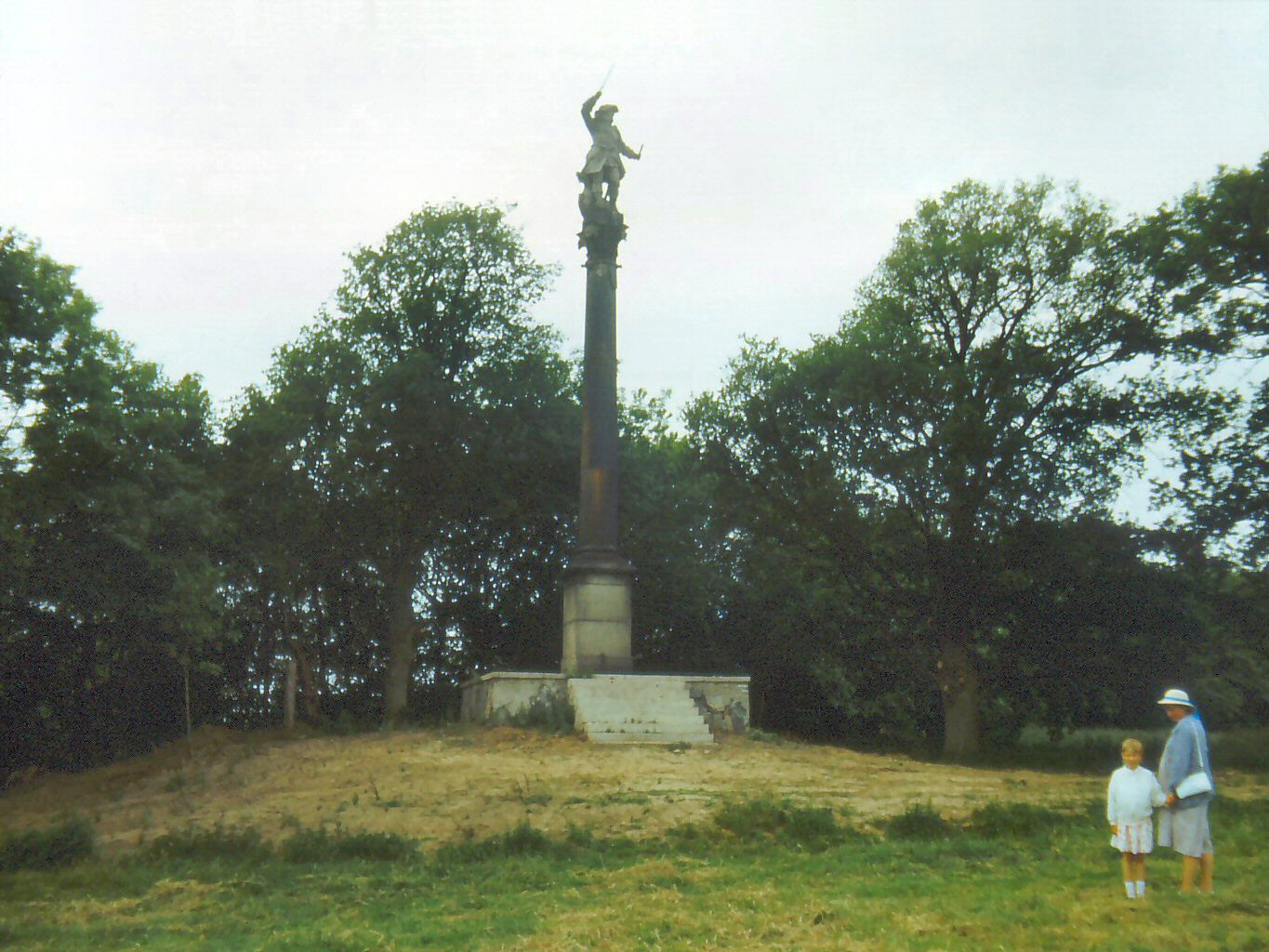
Prussian columns at Neukamp at the site of the landing place, built in 1854

To commemorate the various landings on Rügen, the Prussian king Frederick William IV ordered the construction of two 15-metre-high Prussia Columns at the respective landing sites in 1854 and 1855. The monument at Neukamp, which portrays the Great Elector Frederick William, was inaugurated on 15 October 1854. These columns were also intended to demonstrate the power of Prussia's claim over the southern Baltic.

== Literature ==
- Maren Lorenz: Das Rad der Gewalt. Militär und Zivilbevölkerung in Norddeutschland nach dem Dreißigjährigen Krieg (1650–1700), Böhlau, Cologne 2007.
- Otto Wendler: Geschichte Rügens – von der ältesten Zeit bis auf die Gegenwart, 1895.
- Curt Jany: Geschichte der Preußischen Armee. Vom 15. Jahrhundert bis 1914. Vol. 1, Biblio Verlag, Osnabrück 1967, pages 258–261.
