= Reinberg Village Church =

Church building in Reinberg, Germany

Coordinates: 54°12′40″N 13°15′02″E

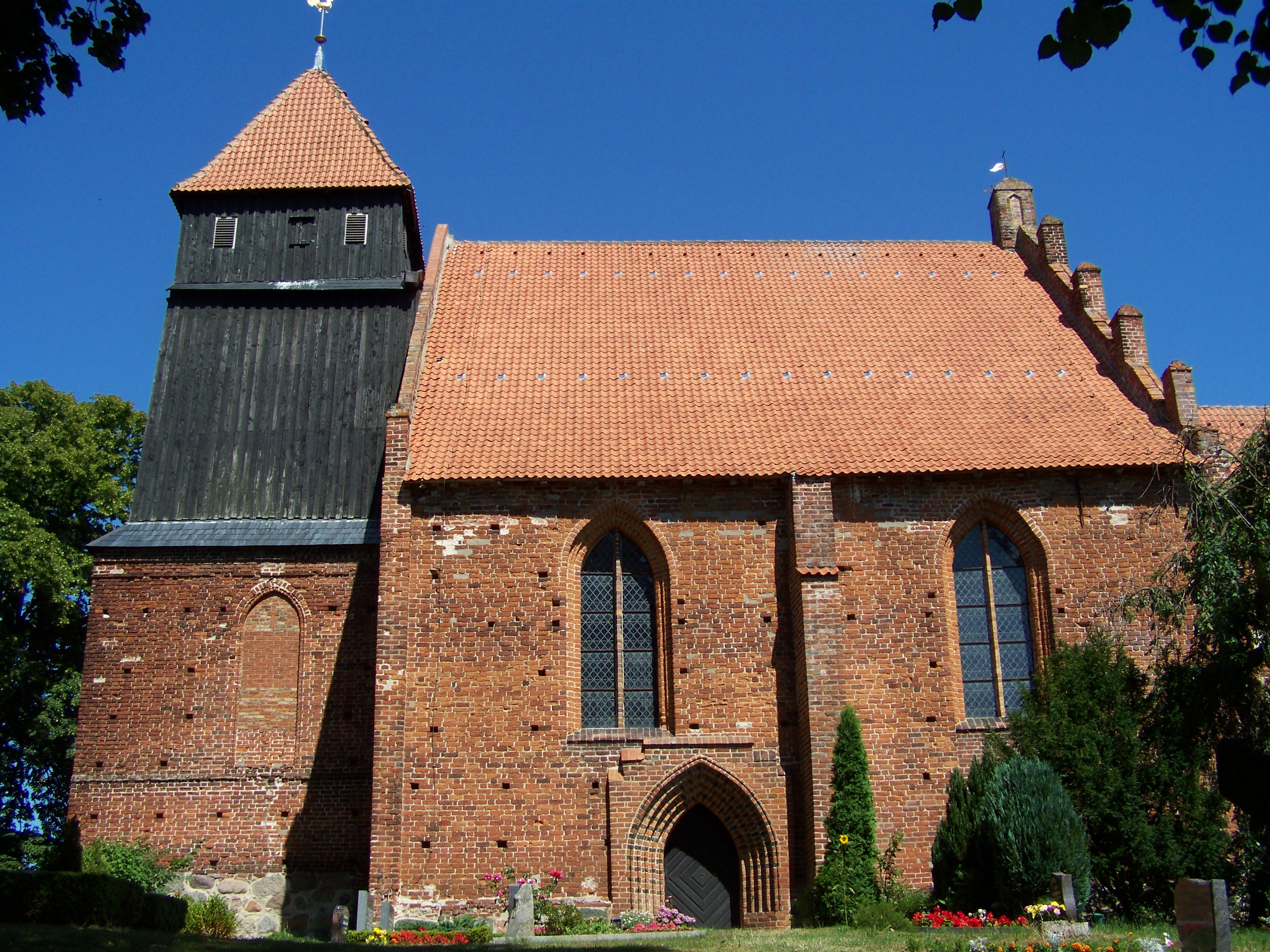
View of the village church in Reinberg

Reinberg Village Church (German: Dorfkirche Reinberg) is a church dating to the 13th century in the West Pomeranian village of Reinberg in the municipality of Sundhagen in northeast Germany.

== History ==
Construction on the church began in the mid-13th century. The chancel was built first, and the nave was added in the first half of the 14th century. At the end of the 14th century and beginning of the 15th, the tower in front of the west wall was built. The sacristy on the north wall of the chancel dates to the 15th century.

== Exterior ==
The building is a triple-aisled brick church. The two-bay hall has a setback, single-bay chancel made of fieldstones.

The chancel is decorated by a round-arched, corbel frieze that runs all around it. On the west side is a square church tower made of brick. The brick gable on the east side has a staggered group of three windows, a staggered ogival window and an ascending round arch frieze.

The main body of the church has lesenes on the corners and buttresses on the side walls.

Immediately next to the church stands the Reinberg Lime, which is estimated to be about 1,000 years old and is therefore probably older than the church itself. Also in the churchyard is an atonement stone, the Sühnestein dating to the mid-15th century.

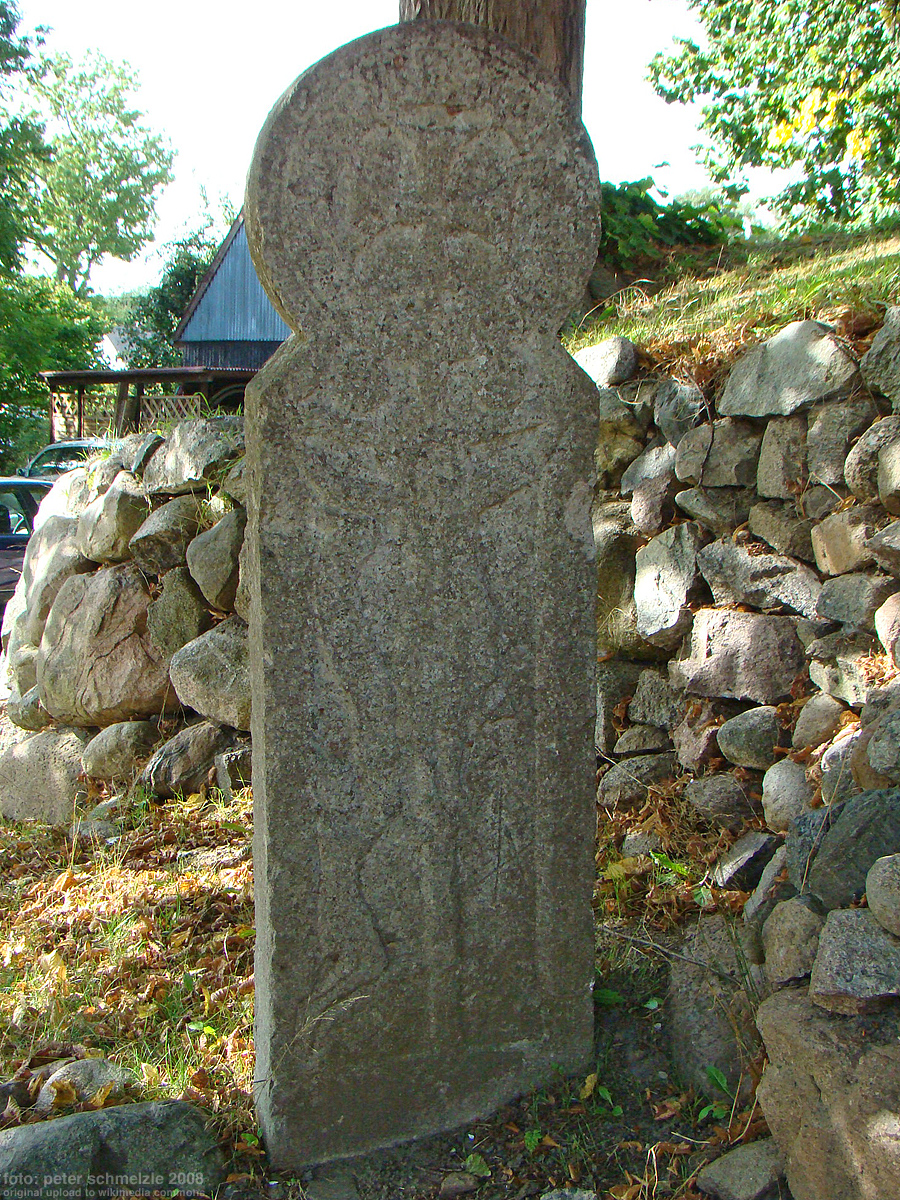
Sühnestein

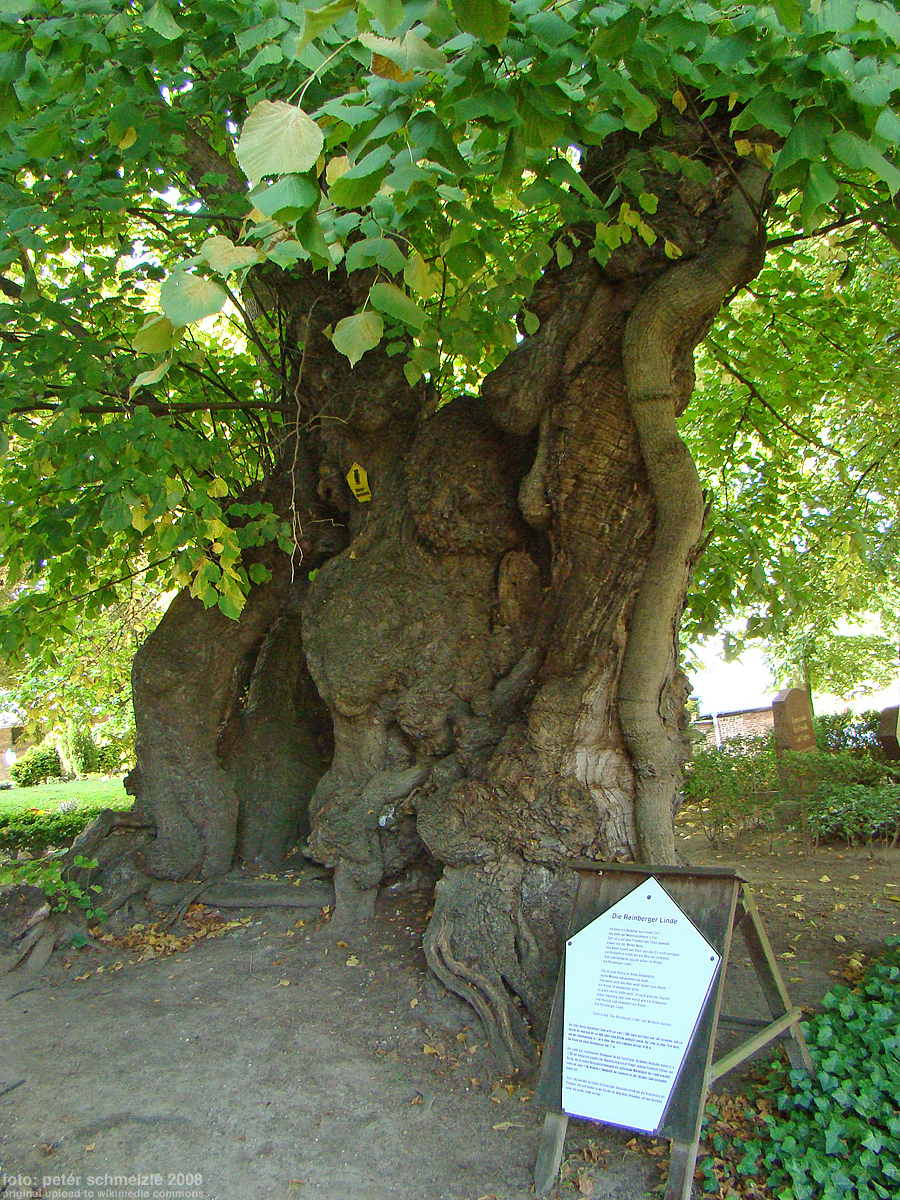
1,000-year-old lime tree
