= Battle of Warksow =

1678 battle in the Swedish-Brandenburg War

- Part of Scanian War
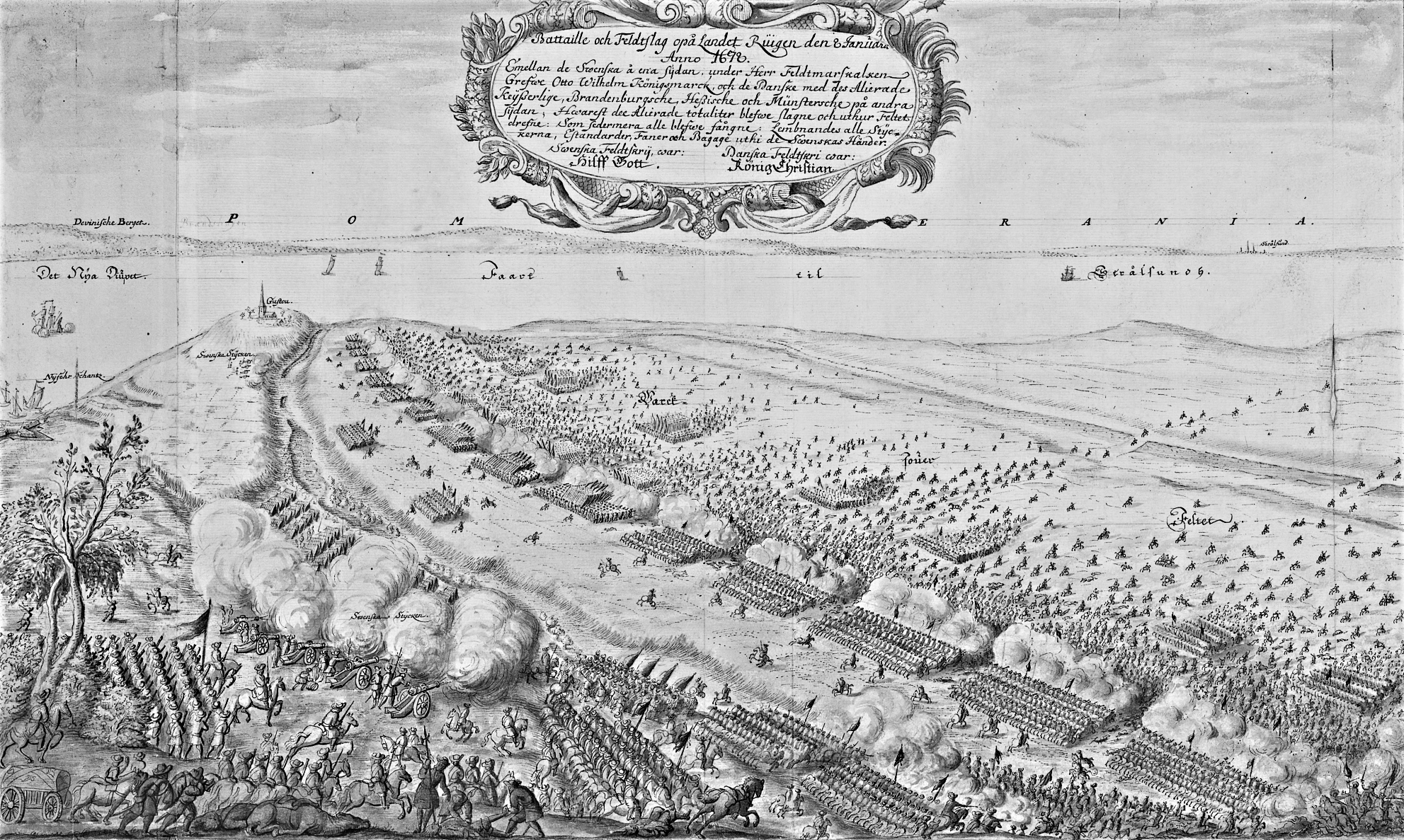
- Battle of Warksow
Date	18 January 1678
Location	Warksow near Gustow on Rügen 54°18′18″N 13°13′38″E
Result	Swedish victory
Territorial changes	Temporary reconquest of Rügen by Sweden

Belligerents
(yes) Swedish Empire	Denmark–Norway; Brandenburg-Prussia; Hesse-Kassel

Commanders and leaders
(Swedish Empire) Otto Wilhelm von Königsmarck	(Denmark–Norway) Detlef von Rumohr † von Hülsen

Strength
3,500: 1,500 infantry 2,000 cavalry	4,670: 2,900 infantry 1,770 cavalry

Casualties and losses
About 170 killed and wounded	4,000: 400 killed 3,600 captured

The Battle of Warksow took place on the Baltic Sea island of Rügen on 8 January (O.S.)/18 January（N.S.）1678 during the Swedish-Brandenburg War. In the battle Swedish forces defeated an allied army composed mainly of Danes supported by a smaller contingent of Brandenburg and Hesse-Cassel troops.

The Swedes were able to muster some 3,500 men for the battle, including 2,000 cavalry. The allied Danish and Brandenburg troops amounted to about 4,670 men, including a few hundred Brandenburg and Hesse-Cassel soldiers and 1,770 cavalry, as well as 16 cannon.

170 Swedes lost their lives in the battle and subsequent pursuit. The Danish/Brandenburg side lost 400 killed and more than 3,600 captured. After the battle and in the days that followed, the entire allied force were captured or forced to follow the Swedish flag.

== Background ==
In 1675, the Kingdom of Sweden, which, at that time, was recognized as a major military power, declared war against Brandenburg-Prussia, following pressure by the French king, Louis XIV, because Brandenburg-Prussia was at war with France (in the Dutch War). After a Swedish army had been defeated in the Battle of Fehrbellin in 1675 in Brandenburg, Sweden went onto the defensive in the next phase of the war. Suddenly its possessions in northern Germany (Swedish Pomerania) were threatened by the alliance of Denmark and Brandenburg-Prussia.

In 1677 the Swedish fleet was almost completely destroyed in the Battle of Køge Bay by the Danish fleet under command of Admiral Niels Juel. For Swedish Rügen this defeat meant that the island possession was now cut off from all assistance from Sweden, as the Danes exercised naval supremacy of the Baltic Sea.

After winning the battle the King of Denmark, Christian V, decided to capture the island of Rügen as a necessary prerequisite to the allies conquering the fort of Stralsund on the opposite mainland shore. According to internal agreements between Brandenburg-Prussia and Denmark, the island of Rügen would be given to Denmark after the peace treaty with Sweden.

On 17 September 1677 Danish troops under the overall command of the Danish king landed on the eastern coast of the island near Prorer Wiek. The roughly 4,200 man strong Danish force met no resistance, however, because the Swedish general, Otto Wilhelm von Königsmarck, had not suspected a Danish invasion at that time and most of his troops had therefore moved into the besieged town of Stralsund.

Thus, the Danes were able to entrench themselves, unchallenged, in the wooded hills in front of the village. After the Danes had provided further support to the Brandenburg cavalry regiment of Colonel Hülsen (2,110 troopers) in October, they advanced on the Swedish troops that had meanwhile transferred to Rügen, and had taken up positions near Bergen. The Swedes were beaten in the ensuing Battle of Bergen and withdrew to Altefähr and into the Prosnitzer Schanze. Shortly thereafter the Swedes under Königsmarck also had to leave Altefähr and march all troops to Stralsund. Only the Prosnitzer Schanze (Neue Fährschanze) remained in Swedish hands.

Due to ongoing looting and devastation by Swedish, Danish and Brandenburg troops, the island in the meantime been completely plundered, so that the deployed troops there could no longer be supplied. On 21 October the Danish king returned to Denmark. Part of the Brandenburg troops were withdrawn from the island, leaving only 970 men from Brandenburg-Prussia on the island.

The Danish-Brandenburg troops were now under the command of Major General von Rumohr and Colonel Wilhelm Friedrich von Hülsen. These two had instructions not to engage with the Swedes until the arrival of further reinforcements. However, any reinforcement from the Danish army, weakened by disease, came to nothing. So the Swedish commander, Field Marshal Otto Wilhelm von Konigsmark, viewed that it was a good time to recapture the island and transferred his 3,500 strong force in January 1678 from Brandshagen to the island. The Swedish chose to land at Neufährschanze which was still in Swedish hands.

== Course of the battle ==
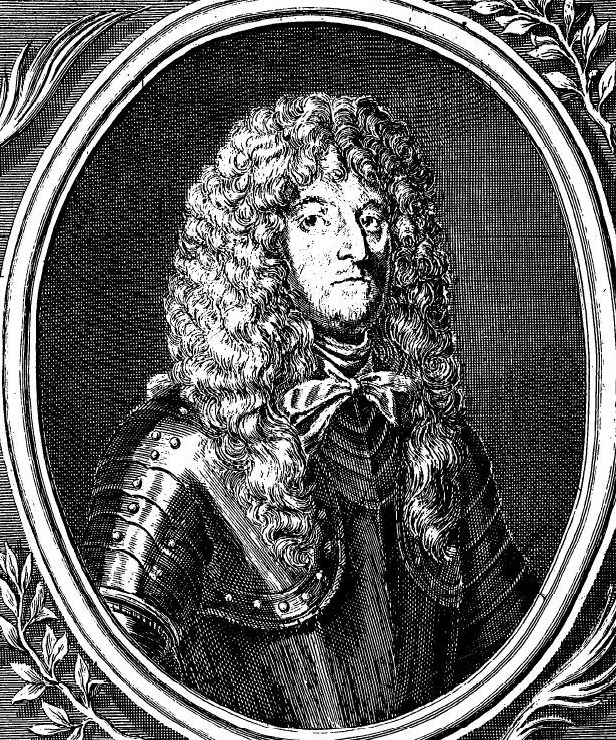
Maj Gen Königsmarck, the Swedish commander

Against orders, the allied Danish and Brandenburg force under Major General von Rumohr gave battle. At 9 in the morning the battle began with an exchange of artillery on the road between Poseritz and Gustow at Warksow Manor.

When Detlef von Rumohr was felled by an artillery shell, confusion arose in the ranks of the allies. In response, the Swedish general, Konigsmark attacked with his troops. The attack was launched by the Swedish right wing against the Brandenburg cavalry. They managed to disperse the Swedish cavalry, but were in turn thrown back, once the Swedish cavalry had reorganised and been reinforced by reserves. The Brandenburg troops rallied again, but received no effective support from the Danes, with the result that they were thrown back by superior numbers again. Swedish forces then attacked the Danish flank and rear. Demoralized, they were routed and put to flight in all directions. The Swedes succeeded in capturing almost the entire Danish infantry. After four hours of battle, the Swedish victory was assured.

== Result of the battle ==
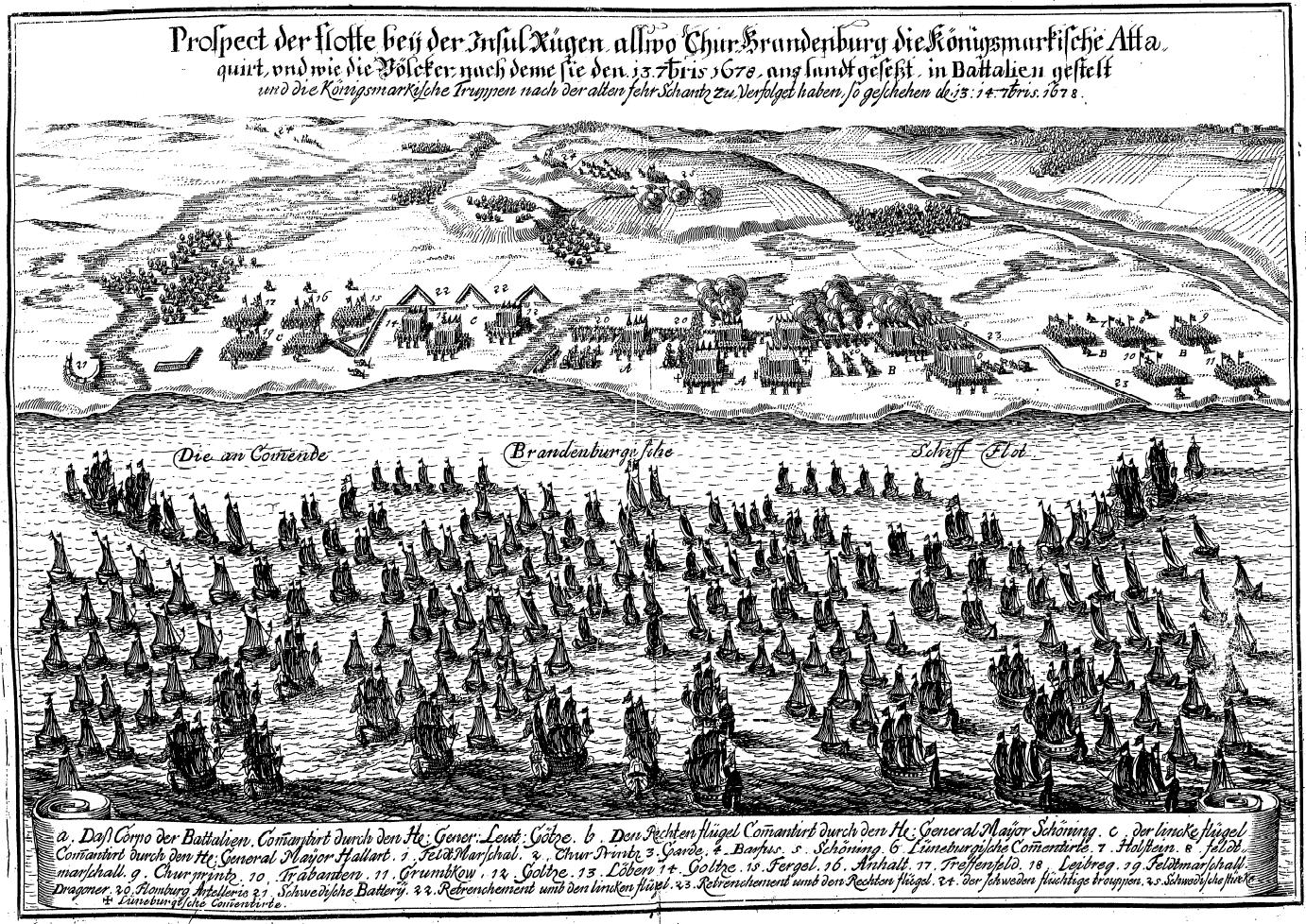
Renewed invasion by the allies on 23 September 1678, 8 months after the battle

The next day, the Swedes occupied Bergen, pursued their fleeing enemy towards Jasmund and Wittow and captured there the last remnants of the allies. The captured soldiers were integrated into the Swedish army and used on Rügen. So Rügen became Swedish again for a short while. However, the Danish and Brandenburg allies quickly recovered from this setback. In the course of the summer 1678 the Danes raided Rügen several times. In addition, the Danes and Brandenburgians were planning a new expedition to recapture Rügen. The invasion of Rügen began on 23 September 1678, when Brandenburg troops again landed on the island of Rügen; within two days they had recaptured it. The prisoners pressed into Swedish service from the Battle of Warksow handed over the fort of Neuefähr without a fight to Brandenburg's invasion forces.

== See also ==
- Wars and battles involving Prussia

== Literature ==
- Curt Jany: Geschichte der Preußischen Armee. Vom 15. Jahrhundert bis 1914. Band 1, Biblio Verlag, Osnabrück 1967, pp. 256–257
- Rystad, Göran (2005). Kampen om Skåne. Historiska Media. ISBN 91-85057-05-3.
