= Wilmshagen =

Wilmshagen may refer to the following places in Northeast Germany:

- Wilmshagen (Sundhagen), a village in the municipality of Sundhagen in the district of Vorpommern-Rügen in Mecklenburg-Vorpommern
- Wilmshagen, a village in the municipality of Ribnitz-Damgarten in the district of Vorpommern-Rügen in Mecklenburg-Vorpommern
