= Palmer Ort =

Point in Germany

Coordinates: 54°13′15″N 13°23′36″E

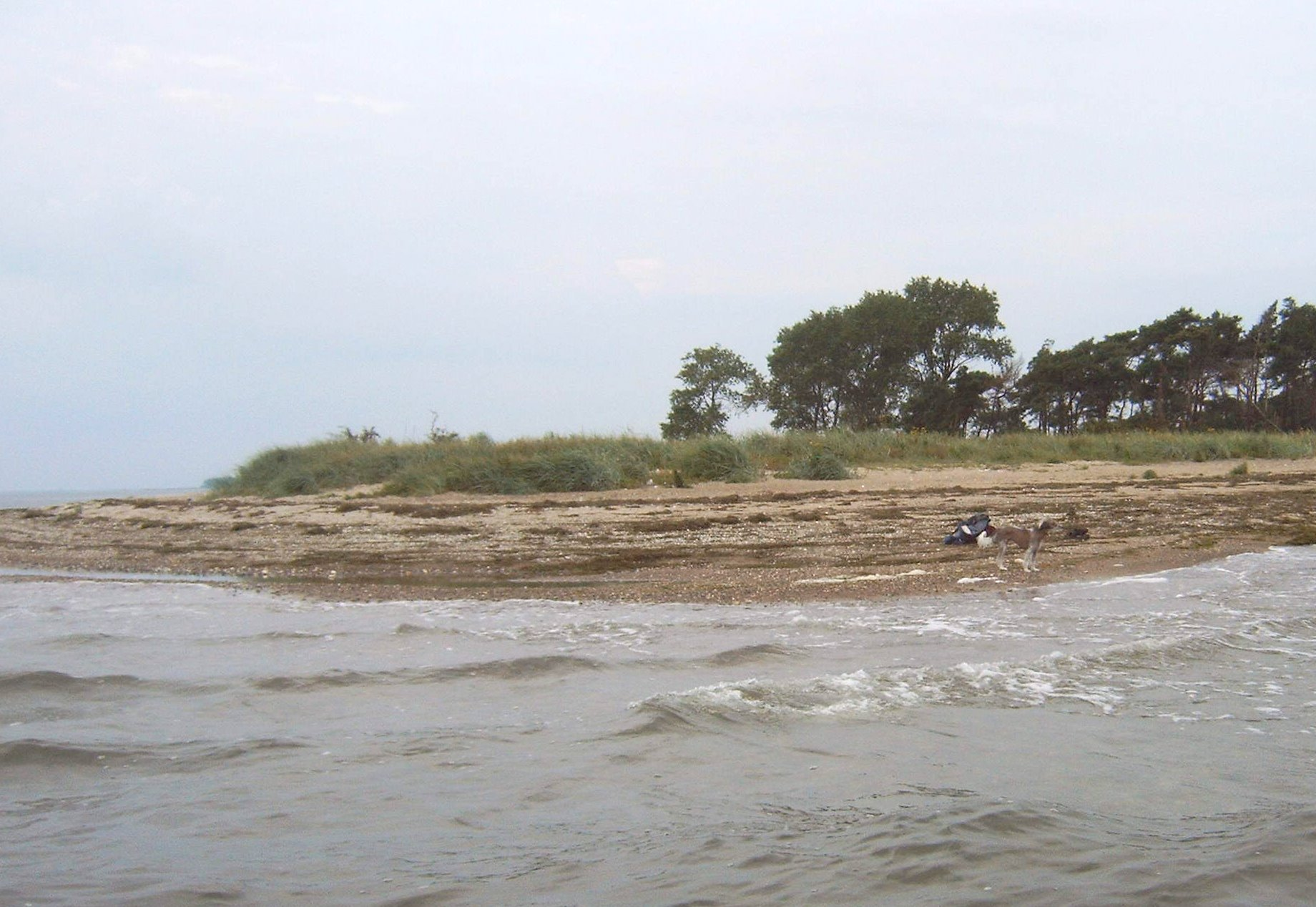
Palmer Ort

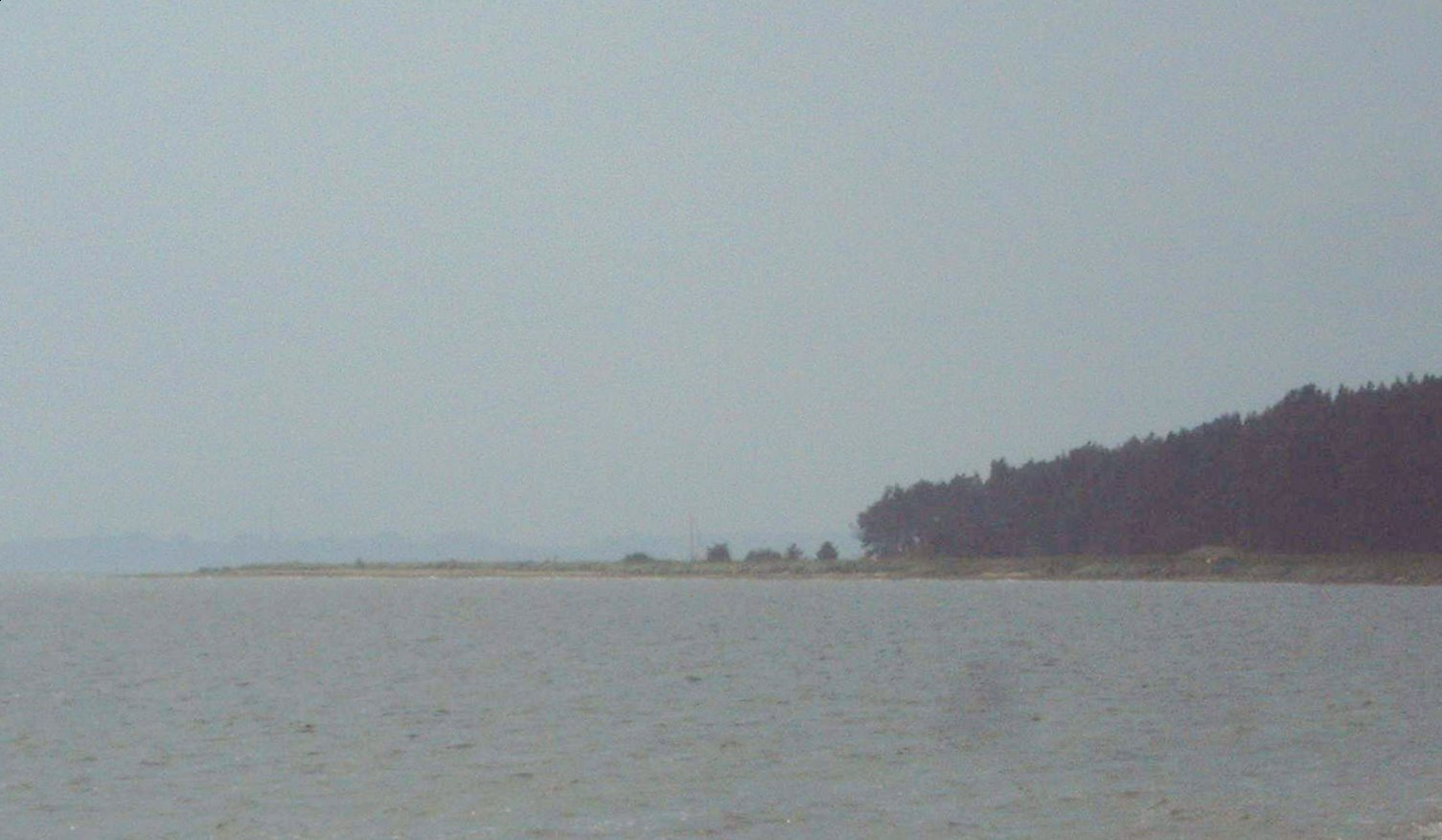
Palmer Ort: view from the east from the beach near Grabow

The Palmer Ort is the southernmost point of the German Baltic Sea island of Rügen and its peninsula of Zudar. The cape lies on the territory of the municipality Garz/Rügen.

== Location ==
Palmer Ort marks the boundary between the Bay of Greifswald and the sound of Strelasund. On the land side, there is a small coastal defence wood in front of the Palmer Ort. Through it runs a woodland path to the Palmer Ort, part of which is laid out as a nature trail, "Know Your World" (Erkenne Deine Welt). The nearest settlement is the small hamlet of Grabow, about 1 kilometre to the northeast. At Palmer Ort itself there is a narrow, natural sandy beach which is not often frequented by visitors because of its isolation. Anglers use the beach to fish for pike.

In winter ice floes at the Palmer Ort often pile up to form heaps of ice several metres in height.

== Palmer Ort in history ==
In 1372, a ship with 90 pilgrims on board sank off the Palmer Ort in a storm. They were travelling on a pilgrimage to St. Lawrence's Church on Zudar. There is a story that there had been a painting of the Blessed Virgin Mary there, which was said to work miracles, but which disappeared after the disaster.

During the Pomeranian campaign of the Great Northern War, Palmer Ort was the scene of hostilities. An invasion fleet of 500 ships from Prussia, Denmark and Saxony sailed towards Palmer Ort on 11 November 1715. Sweden, to which Rügen belonged, gathered its forces in the area of Palmer Ort. The invasion fleet was fired upon from the Zudar peninsula, but no significant losses occurred. The fleet did not actually intend to land at Palmer Ort, which was strongly held by the Swedes, but could not implement its real plan for the landing, due to unfavourable wind conditions. A few days later, however, much of the fleet put off to the northeast in the fog, unnoticed by the Swedes, and landed unscathed at Groß Stresow. One of the Prussian columns there commemorates this landing. Some ships were left in front of Palmer Ort to continue to feign a landing attempt there.

== Palmer Ort as a namesake ==
In 1968 a buoy tender belonging to the East German navy, the Volksmarine, was given the name of Palmer Ort. The town of Stralsund named one of its roads Zum Palmer Ort.
