= Kaditz Lime Tree =

Coordinates: 51.08333°N 13.67140°E

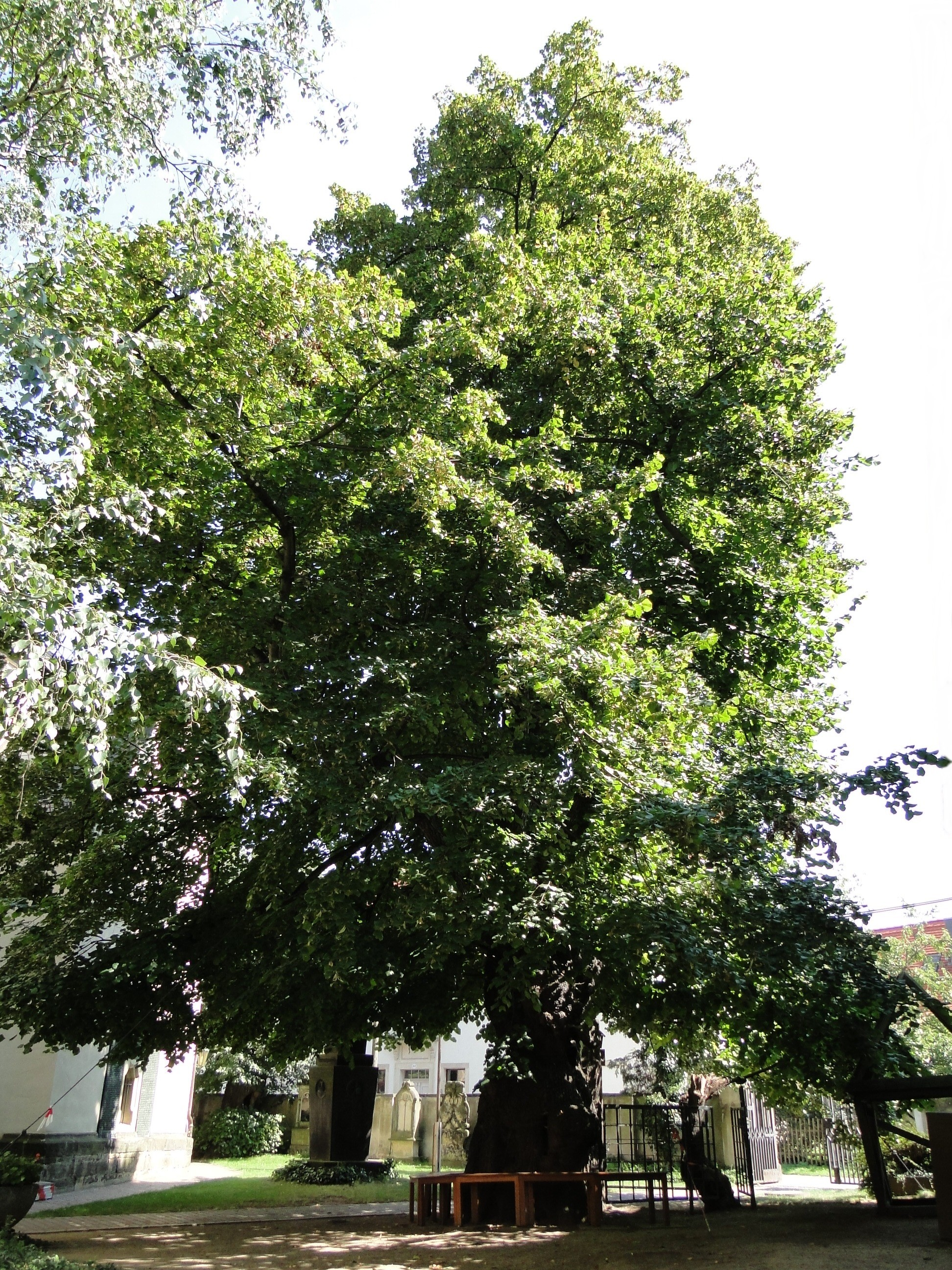
The Kaditz Lime tree near Dresden, Germany

The lime tree of Kaditz is a natural landmark situated in the churchyard of Emmaus Church in Kaditz, a district of Dresden in Saxony, Germany. The large-leaved lime tree (Tilia platyphyllos) is 20 metres (66 ft) high and is estimated to be between 500 and 1,000 years old. The girth of the trunk is about 10 metres (33 ft). In 1818 the tree was badly damaged by a huge fire in the village, which caused the trunk to split in two. It developed an abnormal growth to compensate for the damage done by the fire. This lime tree has often been written about and depicted, especially in Germany, and has also been used as a case study in dendrology, the science of trees and wooded plants. With its large girth it was ranked among the biggest lime trees in Germany even in the 19th century. The Kaditz Lime is also said to have served as a kind of pillory in the Middle Ages. The German Tree Archive includes it in its list of the most significant trees in the nation (NBB – national bedeutsame Bäume), in which the most important criterion is the girth of the trunk measured at a height of 1 metre.

== Location ==
The lime tree is situated in the centre of the village of Kaditz, a district of Dresden, on the right bank of the Elbe, where it stands on a plateau with no danger of flooding, about 6 kilometres (3.7 mi) north-west of the historic centre of Dresden. The Kaditz flood channel passes by the town to the south, constructed between 1918 and 1922 as part of flood prevention in Dresden on the site of an abandoned channel of the Elbe, which was eroding due to flooding at high water. The lime tree is situated at approximately 110 metres (360 ft) above sea level and about 10 metres above the normal water level of the Elbe. The lime is situated next to the Protestant Emmaus Church, which is surrounded by a 5,400 square metres (58,000 sq ft) cemetery.

The lime tree is protected from storms by the vicarage and the church, which stand approximately 15 metres apart. The crown spans a large part of the churchyard. A memorial to the fallen soldiers of both World Wars is situated close to the tree. The ground around the lime tree is not sealed, but partly grassed over. A few metres away stands another lime tree, which, according to the parish register, was planted in 1622. The Elbe Cycle Route, which is over 20 kilometres (12 mi) long, passes through Kaditz past the lime tree.

== History ==
=== To 1818 ===
Emmaus Church was first mentioned in 1273, under the name of St. Lawrence's Chapel, which was dedicated to Lawrence of Rome. It is said that the lime was planted next to the chapel at the time it was built. In 1430, the Hussites set St. Lawrence's Chapel on fire, but due to favourable wind conditions the tree only suffered minimal damage. In around 1500, the church was rebuilt and a new cemetery laid out, which is now the oldest in Kaditz. Until 1862 the cemetery was the only public burial ground in Kaditz.

In 1637, when the Thirty Years' War was raging in Saxony, the church was in flames again. Miraculously, the lime tree remained almost unscathed. The church remained a burnt-out ruin for years after the fire until restoration began in 1650. Remains of the Lawrence chapel form part of today's steeple. During the Thirty Years' War, Swedish troops camped under the lime tree. In 1686 the parsonage was built next to the church with the result that the lime tree was now situated between the two buildings.

Despite enlargement of the churchyard in 1737, the continual shortage of space meant that some of the graves had to be placed close to the lime tree. Thus they were within the rooted area of the tree, which is typically very extensive with lime trees. In 1839 Saxonia magazine stated that the lime tree "probably nourished itself from the surrounding corpses". The advancing age and the increasing girth of the lime tree meant that it became more and more well-known. The girth of 21 ells (11.9 metres) made it a remarkable feature. Hence, the Duke of Courland, who was the third son of Friedrich August II and the grandchild of August the Strong, had the lime tree geometrically recorded in around 1750.

== 19th century ==
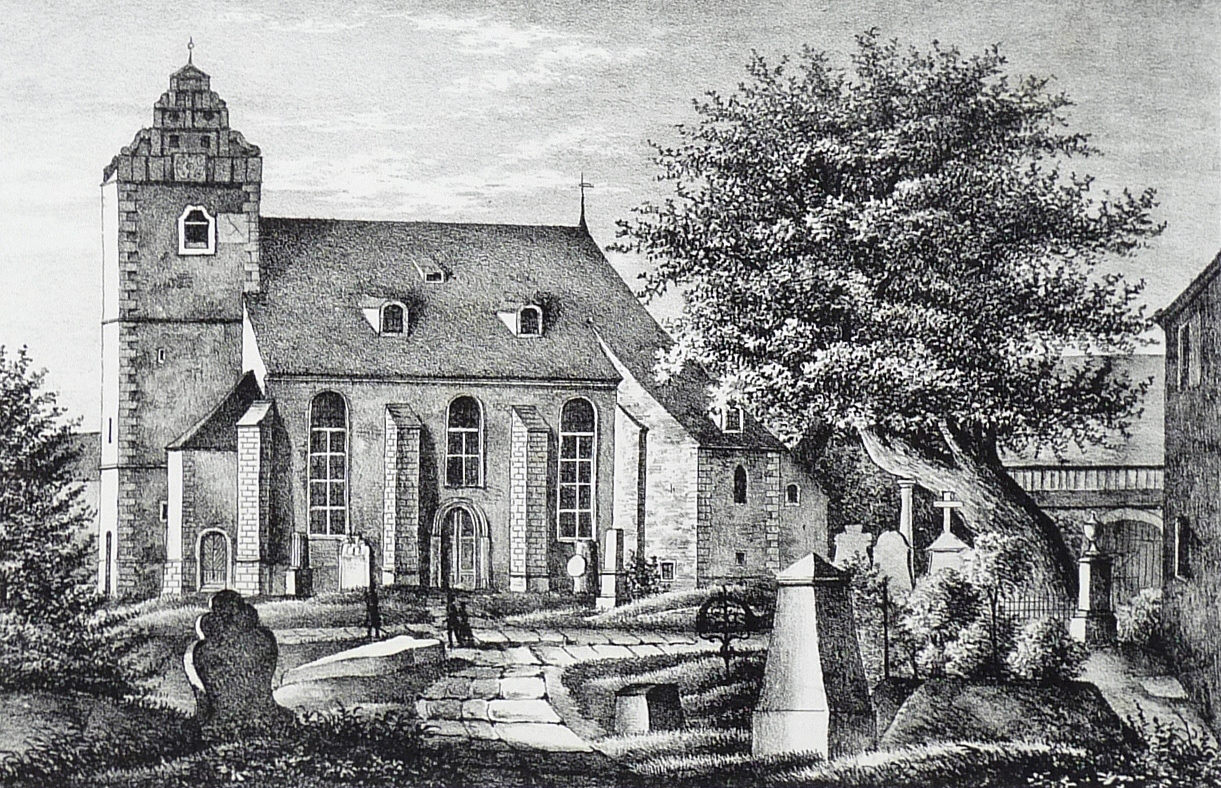
Church in Kaditz with the lime tree, lithography from 1837

That same year, a great fire occurred in Kaditz – this time mainly in the west of the town. The fire destroyed 19 farmhouses, 30 barns and the rectory, which was located a few metres from the lime tree. The fire leapt from the parsonage onto the big lime tree and destroyed one half of the trunk, which burned down to the core. However, the lime tree prevented the fire from spreading from the parsonage onto the church and, despite significant damage, the lime tree survived. Because of the damage, a large cavity facing the rectory opened up in the trunk, which had been hollow, but fully closed up until then. Thus the lime tree decomposed slowly from the inside. The cavity inside the trunk was so big that it was possible to set up tables and chairs inside. On many occasions, young people would gather there to play music. Over a period of decades the tree's roots developed further, forming secondary trunks to strengthen the remains of the main trunk and to increase the tree's stability. Because of this phenomenon, the lime tree was often the object of excursions for teachers and students in the field of dendrology, the science of trees and wooded plants. The tree's fame increased even more after the fire and the development of its abnormal growth. Many drawings and pictures of the lime tree have emerged, one of which was displayed at an art exhibition in Dresden, which contributed to its growing popularity. One could read about the tree's fate in journals and magazines, in which the authors spared no superlatives describing the age and fortune of the Kaditz lime tree.

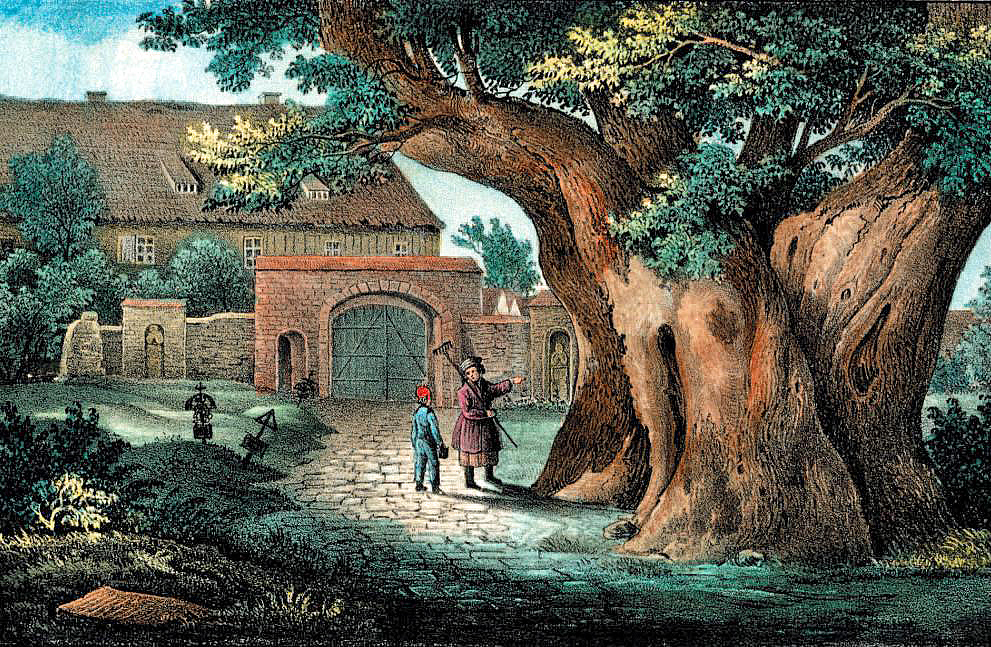
The great lime tree in the churchyard in Kaditz, lithography by Carl Wilhelm Arldt, after Julius Fleischmann, around 1840

In 1823, Johann Gottfried Ziller, who was the cantor at that time, noted: "It is remarkable that nature gradually re-covered the inner walls in the hollow of the trunk with new bark and brought new life to the trunk." Seven years later, Superintendent Karl Christian Seltenreich, who was pastor of the Church of the Holy Cross in Dresden, gave the order to support the lowest and heaviest branch with pillars and timber in order to prevent it from breaking off. The construction was shaped like a gate and plastered like brickwork in order to give it the appearance of a stone pillar construction. Sachsens Kirchen-Galerie aus dem Jahre 1836 enthält Angaben zur Größe des Stammes und einen Vergleich zu anderen Linden: „Auf dem Kirchhofe zu Kaditz befindet sich eine Linde, die ihres Umfanges und hohen Alters wegen bemerkenswerth ist. Die bekannte große Linde bei Augustusburg mißt 18 ½ Ellen im Umfange ihres Stammes. Eine Linde in Schwaben wird von 18 Ellen Stammesumfang und als die älteste und stärkste in Deutschland aufgeführt. Diese, auf dem Kirchhofe zu Kaditz, mißt am Fuße 19 ¾ Ellen. Der Greisenbaum ist hohl, und der größte Durchmesser seiner Höhlung beträgt 5 Ellen."[19] Ein Beitrag in Saxonia, einer Zeitschrift aus dem Jahre 1839 mit der Überschrift Die große Linde auf dem Kirchhofe zu Kaditz bei Dresden vergleicht die Kaditzer ebenfalls mit der Augustusburger Linde: „Auf dasigem Kirchhofe, dem Hauptthore gegenüber zwischen der Kirche und dem Pfarrhause, befindet sich jene durch Größe und Alter ausgezeichnete Linde. Ihr Stamm übertrifft die Augustusburger Linde von 18 ½ Elle Umfang, denn die Kaditzer faßt in der stärksten Breite 21 Ellen."[4] In der Zeitschrift Das Vaterland der Sachsen aus dem Jahre 1844 wird ausführlich über die Kaditzer Linde berichtet:[15]

The journal Saxony's Church Gallery (Sachsens Kirchen-Galerie) from 1836 contains references to the size of the trunk and compares it to other lime trees: "There is a lime tree in the churchyard of Kaditz, which is remarkable due to its circumference and great age. The circumference of the trunk of the well-known lime tree near Augustusburg measures 18 1/2 ells. A lime tree in Swabia with a girth of 18 ells is listed as the oldest and strongest in Germany. The one in the churchyard of Kaditz measures 19 3/4 ells at the root. The ancient tree is hollow, and the diameter of its cavity totals 5 ells." [19] An article in Saxonia, a journal from 1839, bearing the title "The Great Lime Tree in the Churchyard of Kaditz Near Dresden" ("Die große Linde auf dem Kirchhofe zu Kaditz bei Dresden"), also compares the Kaditz lime to that at Augustusburg: "In that churchyard, opposite the main gate and between the church and the parsonage, stands the lime tree, which is conspicuous for its size and age. The Kaditz lime tree, measuring 21 ells at its maximum girth, surpasses the Augustusburg lime tree with a girth of 18 1/2 ells." The journal The Fatherland of the Saxons [Das Vaterland der Sachsen] of 1844 reports at length about the Kaditz lime tree:

It is neither the tree's height, nor the spread of its branches that makes it peculiar. Without doubt, it is its girth and its great age which lets the tree compete with the most famous of the oldest trees of Saxony, and even top them. For while the ancient lime tree of Augustusburg has a circumference of slightly more than 18 ells, and while the one in Annaberg, which is especially remarkable because it must once have been planted upside down in its former location, do not reach this girth, the periphery of the trunk of the Kaditz lime tree, with a height of 8 to 10 ells, measures not less than 39 ½ feet.

and

According to a not improbable report given by older residents, the old trunk of the lime tree served as a pillory for those who had forfeited church penance; and indeed some iron rings and clips, almost completely overgrown by the bark, can still be found in the trunk. It appears that in the more recent centuries it was frequently necessary to saw off the far too high and strong branches, partly because they were disadvantageous for the roof of the church and the rectory, and partly because they had threatened to tear apart and destroy the trunk, which became increasingly hollow. This created over time the big, chimney-like holes in the trunk, through which many a jocund fellow crawled in order to present his head merrily to his playmates as a young fruit of the old tree. – Das Vaterland der Sachsen. 1844.

== Recent history ==
The municipality of Kaditz lost its autonomy and became part of Dresden in 1903. The village lime tree became a city idyll, as it was extolled on postcards. The daily newspaper Saxon News wrote in 1909: "The colossal Kaditz lime tree that stands in the cemetery of the village of Kaditzis one of the oldest trees in Saxony, perhaps even one of the oldest trees in Germany. The girth measured 12.5 metres and the diameter 4 metres." On 7 June 1925, a war memorial that stands about 22 yards away from the lime tree was inaugurated in a ceremonial act. It shows a large, carved stone eagle that faces the tree. In 1945 in the early days after the World War II, an inhabitant of Kaditz was said to have hidden in the hollow trunk by night in order to escape the raids in the houses.

Around 1960 very old graves around the roots of the lime tree were exposed and cleared. Over the years a very small second trunk had grown out of the hollow of the trunk, which was open on one side. The space between both trunk segments grew over time. The pastor at the time, Karl-Heinz Scharf, devoted himself to the history of the lime tree. This contributed to the tree's popularity and consequently, around 1970, bridal couples began visiting the tree after the church ceremony. With this Scharf sought to symbolise the shared path through life that newlyweds must stick to in the face of whatever obstacles. The lattice fence protecting the tree was removed for these services.

The lime tree was named the "flagship of all lime trees" in 1975. Since that year, the trunk of the lime tree has been protected by two new lattice fences. On 3 September 1985 the area was declared a natural monument, along with 30 further trees, according to a resolution passed by Dresden city council. This has resulted in regular checks and care of the tree. In 1996 the crown was braced at a cost of roughly 7,000 British pounds. In 1997 a Swiss firm applied for the rights to a gravel quarry in the Kaditzer area, which would have extended beyond the year 2010. This would have caused the water table to sink so low as to dry out the lime tree. Dresden's regional city council however rejected the application after countless residents and members of open institutions had voiced their opposition.

In 2008, a branch of the smaller part of the trunk was on the verge of breaking off with the upper part of the bark, so it had to be supported by a metal strut. During the flood of the century in 2002 Kaditz was completely enclosed by water; the lower districts were flooded. The flood water flowed over the high cemetery wall and submerged the graves in the cemetery. The water stopped at the highest point of the area, on the threshold of the church and just in front of the lime tree's main trunk. In 2003, the new sign and a new information board were placed next to the old natural monument with the owl. In recent times too there have been regular reports about the lime tree in both newspapers and books. The silviculturist and conservationist Hans Joachim Fröhlich, initiator of the Association of Old Adorable Trees in Germany (Alte liebenswerte Bäume in Deutschland e. V.), wrote in 2000: "The lime tree is a monumental tree with many feet, arms and bodies." The Dresden newspaper Dresdner Neuesten Nachrichten published an article on the lime tree on April 3, 2004 with the headline, "Methuselah of the trees". "Kaditz lime tree - Older than the city. After it burned down to a torso in the village fire of 1818, the lime tree next to the Kaditz church still bears new shoots every spring. With an estimated age of a thousand years, the Kaditz lime tree is the oldest tree in Dresden."

== Description ==
Before the fire in 1818 the trunk was, in fact, already hollow, but it was completely sealed. During the fire a section of the trunk was charred and it formed a hole. The hole expanded when the tree later lost another main bough, as the part of the tree supporting it was rotten and collapsed under the weight. Over time the trunk divided into two halves, which increasingly grew apart. The smaller of the two parts, which stands completely isolated several metres from the main trunk, is still only around 20 × 100 cm and has a couple of smaller branches that grow new leaves each year. The larger trunk was not damaged by fire in 1818 and is unusually sturdy and has lots of holes.

=== Diameter of the trunk ===
Since the beginning of the 19th century numerous reports have given concrete measurements that differ in units of length. Although having decreased in girth because of the huge fire in 1818, the lime tree still had more than 10 metres of girth when it was measured back in the 19th century. In Sachsens Kirchen-Galerie (i.e. "Saxony’s church gallery") the girth of the trunk was stated to be of 19 ¾ cubits in 1836. Saxonia nannte im Jahre 1839 einen Umfang von 21 Ellen. In 1839 Saxonia stated the girth to be of 21 cubits. Im Jahre 1856 wurde in Flora oder allgemeine botanische Zeitung der Umfang am Stammfuß mit 18 Ellen angegeben. The 1844 edition of Das Vaterland der Sachsen (Fatherland of the Saxons) claimed that the girth was 39 ½ feet. In Flora oder allgemeine botanische Zeitung (Flora or General Botanic Magazine), the girth at the foot of the trunk was said to be of 18 cubits.

== Historical depictions ==
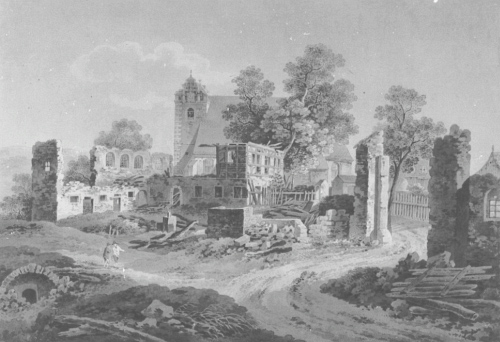
1802 depiction next to the burned out church

The interior of the Emmaus Church was redesigned in the Baroque style from 1750 to 1756 and a ceiling painting was added. The fresco depicts an apocalyptical angel with five candleholders. In the background there is an enormous tree, which appears odd due to its girth and size: it is thus supposed to depict the Kaditz lime tree. The copperplate engraving from 1782 is attributed to the artist Johann Christian Klengel and depicts the tree among the graves in the Kaditz churchyard and is the oldest known pictorial representation of the tree.

During a fire in east Kaditz in 1802 the parsonage too was damaged, whilst the lime tree was once again barely touched. A lithograph from approximately 1802 by the artist Gustav Taubert shows the burned out parsonage with the lime tree and church in the background. In 1812 Napoleon's soldiers trooped through the village past the lime tree. An excerpt from page 128 of the book Dresden und das Elbgelände (Dresden and the area around the river Elbe), which was published in 1818 by the Association for the Promotion of Dresden and its Tourism, reads "An ancient lime tree in the churchyard".

== Events ==
Every year on the day of Saint John the Baptist a traditional evensong is held with the church's faithful and after that a collective singing of folk songs takes place. Reports go back to 1830: "So people went to the church, in front of which the old, honourable lime tree, which surely is one of the biggest in Germany (perimeter of 18 cubits), was draped with wreaths."

During the 2010 Football World Cup the first match with German participation was broadcast in a public viewing event under the lime tree.

Concerts, belonging to a series of concerts called "Orgel plus", are staged in the Emmaus Church several times a year. They are organised by the "Förderkreis Kirchenmusik Laurentius Dresden e.V.", a group of voluntary workers supporting church music. After the concerts people meet for a gemuetlich gathering under the lime tree and drink beverages together.

== Anecdotes ==
=== Goethe ===
Johann Wolfgang von Goethe visited Dresden a total of seven times. Being interested in history and a literate artist, who used to research and publicize in different natural scientific areas, he was likely to be interested in the lime tree, which was widely known among natural scientific interested people, because of its high age and its tall growth. During his final stay in Dresden in August 1813 or already in 1810 he is said to have visited the Kaditz Lime Tree and to have been very impressed by its superb figure and its high age. Goethe's visit is said to be noted in a book although it is not known which book it is.

=== Pillory ===
According to the tradition, the lime – tree was used as a pillory in the medieval times, apparently chained delinquents would be shown up in front of the lime tree until the 18th century. Church goers would pass them and give them despised and taunting looks. In Saxony's church gallery in 1836 it is written: "According to the elder, who retell from their fathers, the trunk was used as a pillory during the usual repentance. The iron collars which were installed for this purpose still remain, but the two half-circles have moved 2 cubits apart from each other due to the enlargement of the tree."

== See also ==
- Reinberg Lime
