= Reinberg Lime =

Coordinates: 54°12′40″N 13°15′03″E

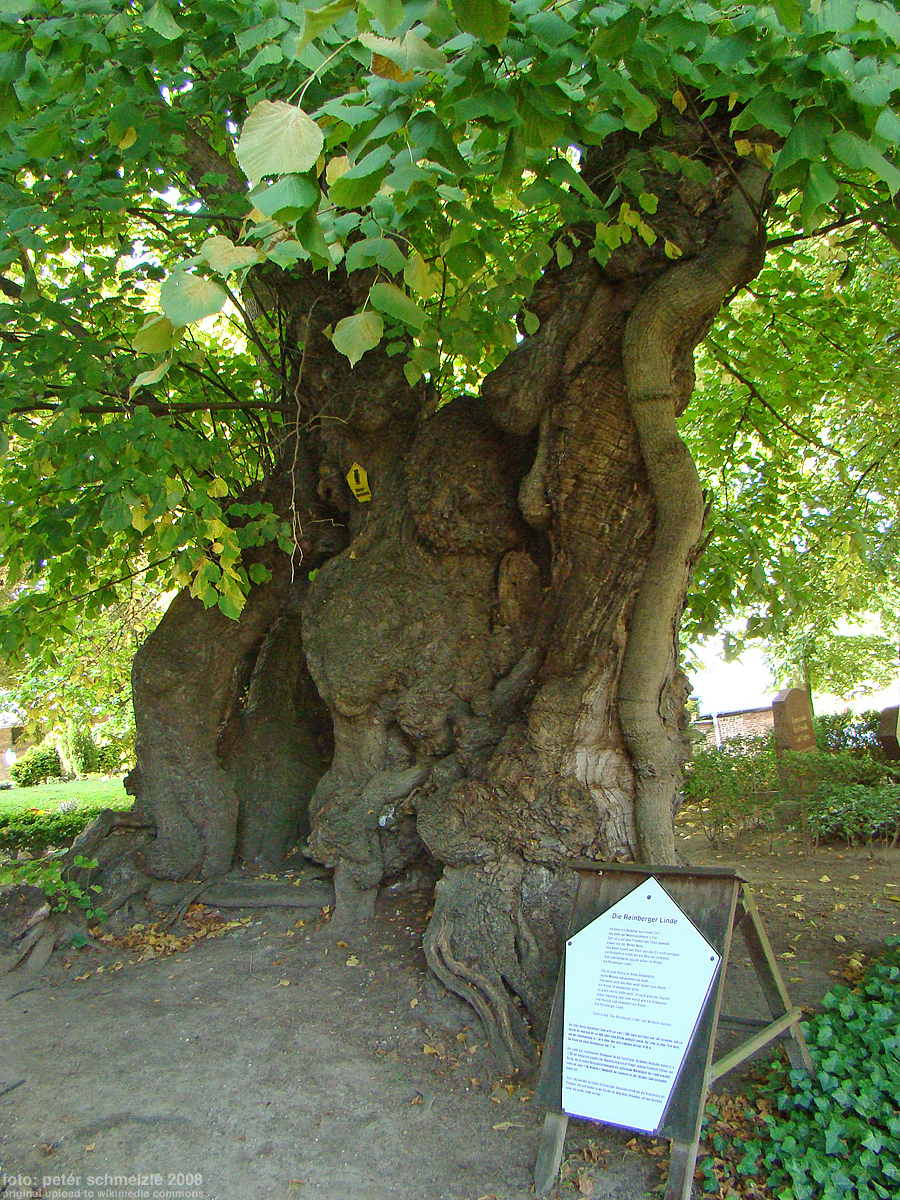
Trunk of the Reinberg Lime

The Reinberg Lime (German: Reinberger Linde) is a roughly 1,000-year-old lime tree by the village church in Reinberg in the German district of Vorpommern-Rügen.

The age of the lime tree, which has been designated as a natural monument, is estimated at 1,000 years old, which makes the tree considerably older than the neighbouring historic village church. The tree has a height of about 19 metres and a crown diameter of about 17 metres. The girth of the trunk at a height of 1.30 metres is 10.80 metres.

From 1782, following a senate resolution, priests were buried beneath the lime tree rather than being interred in front of the altar as had hitherto been the case. In 1795, the lime was mentioned in the travel diaries of Johann Friedrich Zöllner. He wrote:

At the halfway point, we stopped in the village of Reinberg in order to see a real curiosity; this was a lime tree in the churchyard that measured 37½ feet in circumference around the lower part of the trunk and was just as green on the inside as on the outside. It is, in fact, entirely hollowed out, and the bark has not only curled inwards at the place where it is cracked, but also supports new branches. It forms two neat bays, each of which can hold several people.

- Diaries of Johann Friedrich Zöllner

In 1796, Wilhelm von Humboldt also admired the tree.

== Literature ==
- Stefan Kühn, Bernd Ullrich, Uwe Kühn: Unsere 500 ältesten Bäume. BLV, Munich, 2009, ISBN 978-3-8354-0376-5, p. 38.

== See also ==
- Kaditz Lime Tree
