= Stubber =

Stony sandbank in Bay of Greifswald

- Location within Baltic Sea

Geography
- Location: Greifswalder Bodden (Baltic Sea)
- Coordinates: 54.23139°N 13.6025°E

The Great or Große Stubber is a stony sandbank that dries out at low water located in the eastern part of the German Baltic Sea lagoon known as the Greifswalder Bodden or Bay of Greifswald. The name Stubber goes back to the Slavic: Stopin for "step".

== History ==
In the Middle Ages the Stubber was an island that became steadily smaller as a result of tree-felling and the excavation of stones. In 1678 the Stubber Bank acted as an assembly area for the entire naval force gathered for the invasion of Rügen which ended with the successful capture of the Swedish-ruled island of Rügen by the Allies, Brandenburg-Prussia and Denmark.

In the 19th century, gravel was extracted for the construction of roads in Greifswald. The island first became awash in the first half of the 20th century. The large glacial erratics that remain to this day are a hazard for sports boats. The Stubber is marked with a shallow water buoy.

Since 2004, the Großer Stubber has been used by the Baltic grey seal (H. g. balticus) as a resting area, after this species had completely died out on the German Baltic Sea coast in 1930. From 2006 increasing numbers of seals, from 7 to 25, were counted on the Großer Stubber all year round.

Since 2006, the Round the Stubber (Rund Stubber) regatta has been held annually in mid-August.

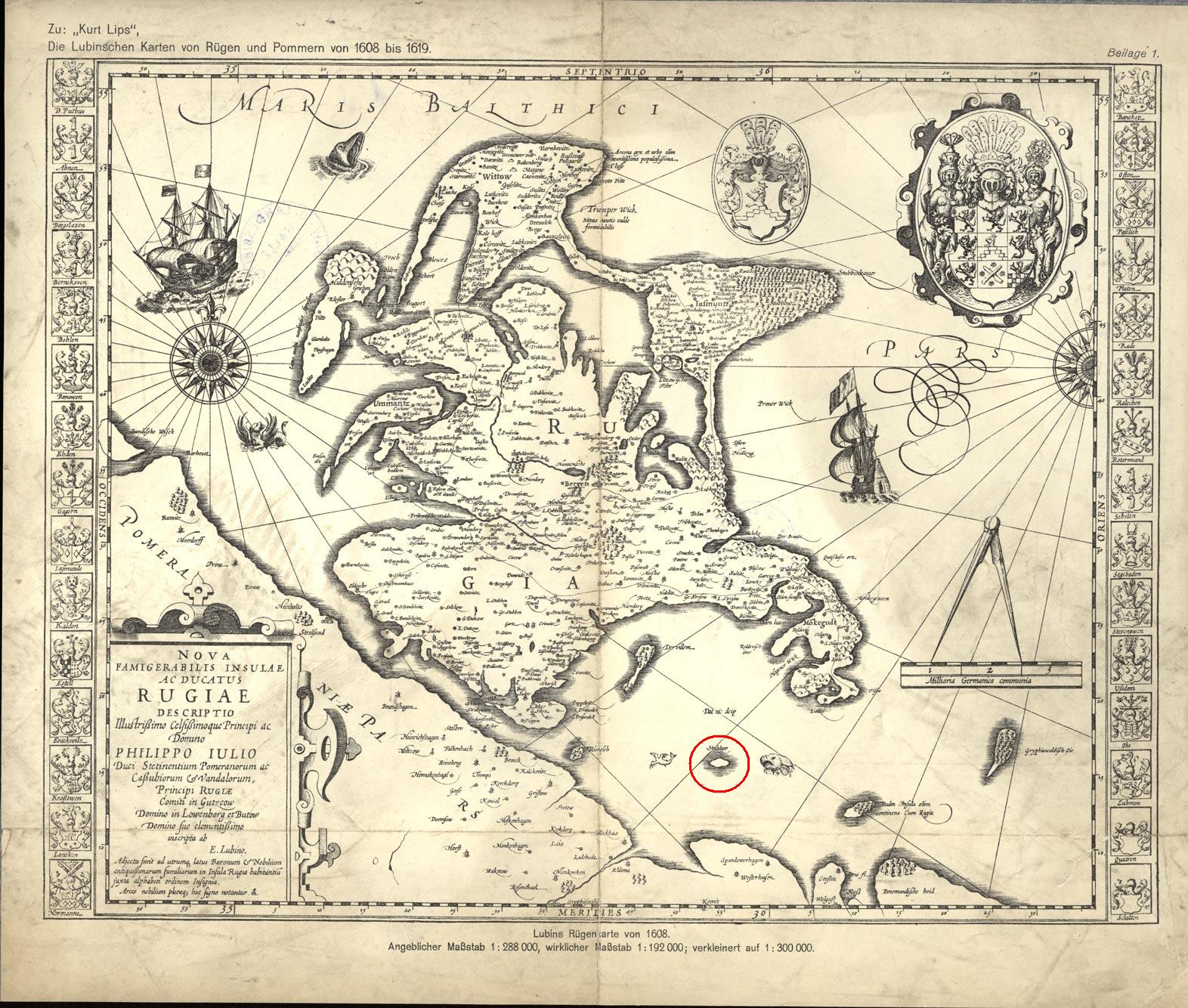
Historic map of Rügen (1608) Former island of Stubber marked in red

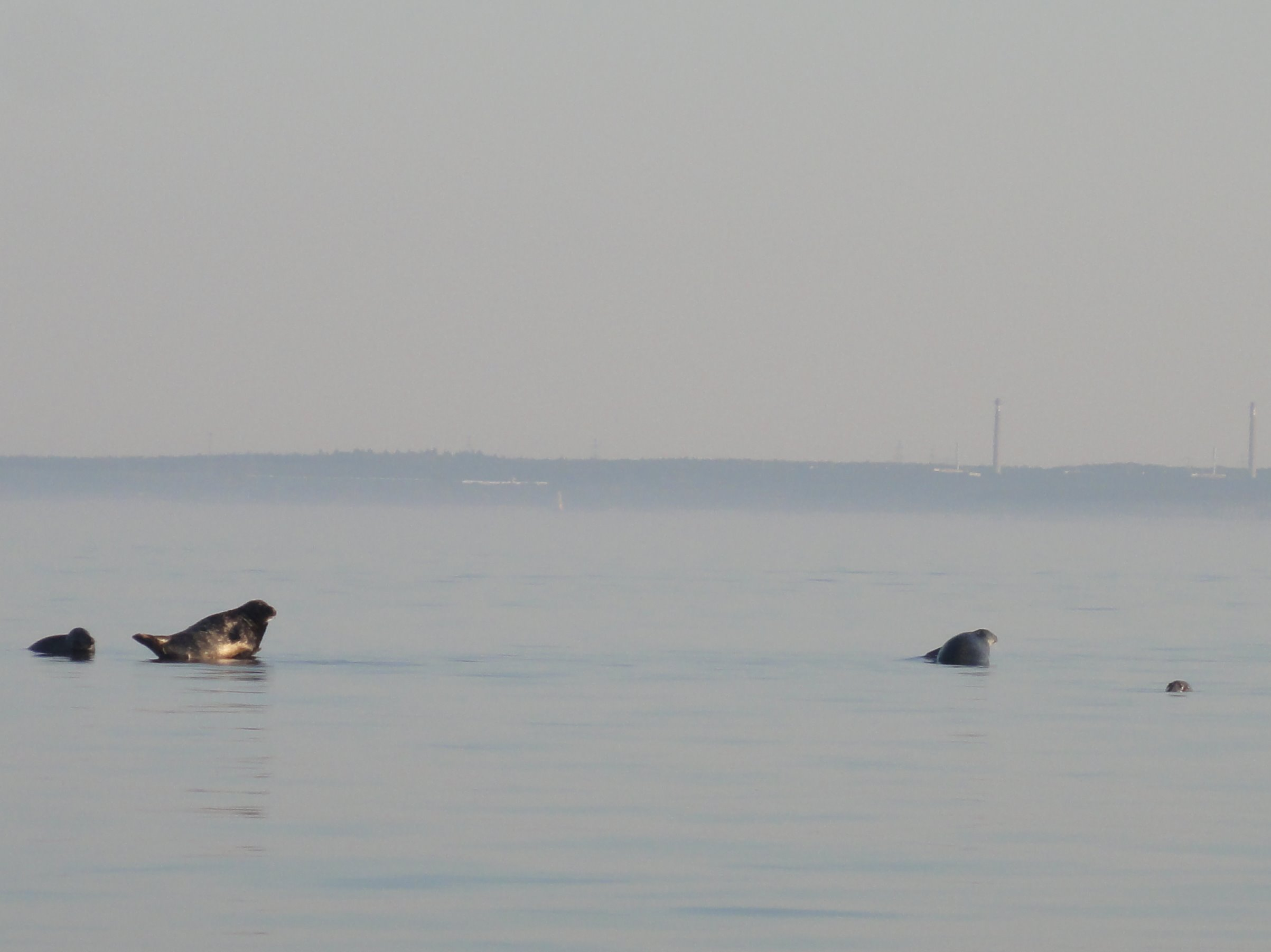
Grey seals on the Großer Stubber
