= Behnkendorf =

- Ortsteil of Sundhagen
- Interactive map of Behnkendorf
- Location within Germany Location within Mecklenburg-Vorpommern
- Coordinates: 54°13′N 13°08′E
- Country: Germany
- State: Mecklenburg-Vorpommern
- District: Vorpommern-Rügen
- Town: Sundhagen

Area
  - Total: 19.05 km^{2} (7.36 sq mi)
- Elevation: 2 m (6.6 ft)

Population (2006-12-31)
  - Total: 387
  - Density: 20.3/km^{2} (52.6/sq mi)
- Time zone: UTC+01:00 (CET)
  - Summer (DST): UTC+02:00 (CEST)
- Postal codes: 18510
- Dialling codes: 038328
- Vehicle registration: NVP
- Website: www.amt-miltzow.de

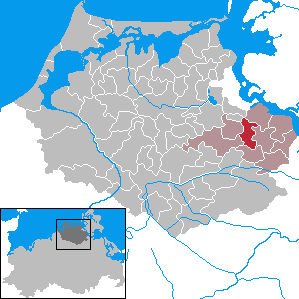
Behnkendorf, Amt Miltzow, district of Nordvorpommern in Mecklenburg-Vorpommern.

Behnkendorf is a village and a former municipality in the Vorpommern-Rügen district, in Mecklenburg-Vorpommern, Germany. Since 7 June 2009, it is part of the Sundhagen municipality.
