= Zudar =

Peninsula in Mecklenburg-Vorpommern, Germany

Coordinates: 54°14′41″N 13°22′36″E

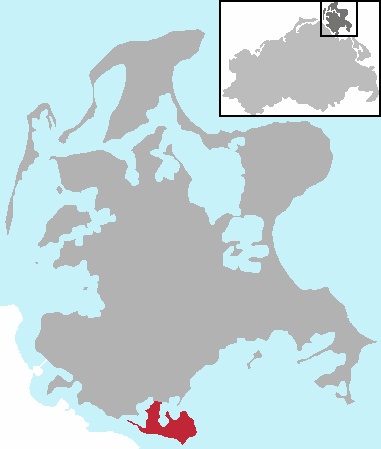
Location of the Zudar peninsula on Rügen

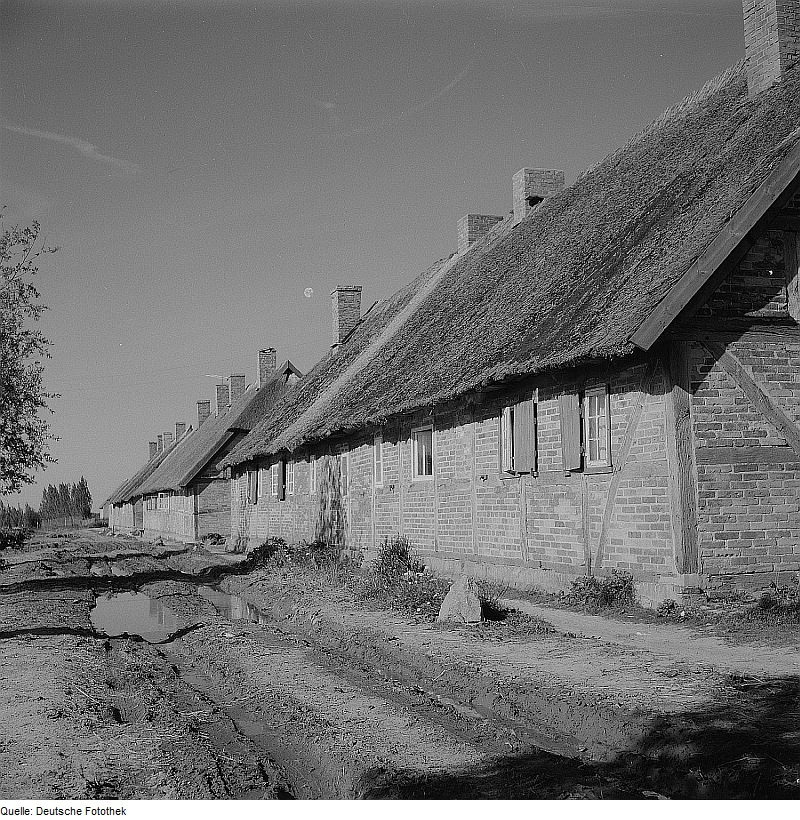
Farmworkers' houses on the Zudar in 1963

The Zudar (German pronunciation: [ˈtsuːdaʁ]) is a peninsula on the German Baltic Sea island of Rügen. It is about 18 square kilometres in area and sharply divided.

== Location ==
The peninsula lies between the bay of Schoritzer Wiek, the lagoon of Rügischer Bodden (the northern part of the Greifswalder Bodden) and the southwestern entrance to the Strelasund.

The peninsula is 900 metres wide at its narrowest point, and its highest elevation is found in the east of the peninsula at a height of 25 m above NN. The Zudar also has the southernmost point of Rügen, the Palmer Ort

== History ==
Until 12 June 2004 the municipality of Zudar that lies on the peninsula was independent. From that date it was incorporated into the town of Garz. This also affected the former Zudar parishes of Freudenberg, Foßberg, Glewitz, Grabow, Losentitz, Maltzien, Poppelvitz and Zicker.

In 1854, Max Hofmeier, who was later a gynaecologist and head of the University of Würzburg, was born on Zudar.

== Sights ==
- St. Laurence's Church (St.-Laurentius-Kirche)
- 1963 farmworkers' houses (Landarbeiterhäuser)

== Transport ==
The Glewitz Ferry – the second most important link between Rügen and the mainland after the fixed Strelasund Bridge – runs between Stahlbrode and the Zudar.
