= Horst, Mecklenburg-Vorpommern =

Horst
- Ortsteil of Sundhagen
- Interactive map of Horst
- Location within Germany Location within Mecklenburg-Vorpommern
- Coordinates: 54°08′N 13°13′E
- Country: Germany
- State: Mecklenburg-Vorpommern
- District: Vorpommern-Rügen
- Town: Sundhagen

Area
  - Total: 29.66 km^{2} (11.45 sq mi)
- Elevation: 0.5 m (1.6 ft)

Population (2006-12-31)
  - Total: 516
  - Density: 17.4/km^{2} (45.1/sq mi)
- Time zone: UTC+01:00 (CET)
  - Summer (DST): UTC+02:00 (CEST)
- Postal codes: 18519
- Dialling codes: 038333
- Vehicle registration: NVP
- Website: www.horst.amt-miltzow.de

Horst (German pronunciation: [hɔʁst]) is a village and a former municipality in the Vorpommern-Rügen district, in Mecklenburg-Vorpommern, Germany. Since 7 June 2009, it is part of the Sundhagen municipality.

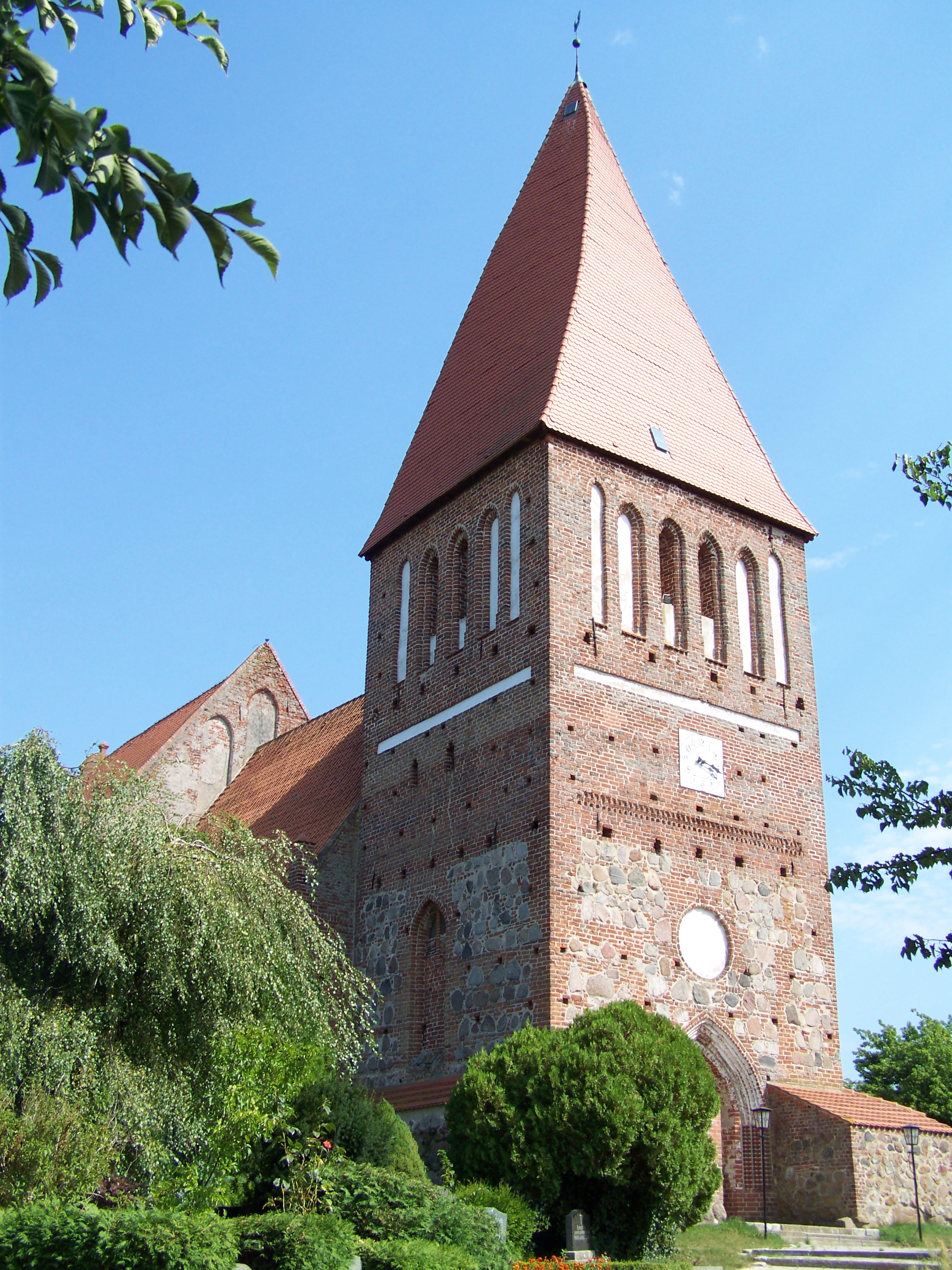
Dorfkirche Horst
