= Miltzow =

- Ortsteil of Sundhagen
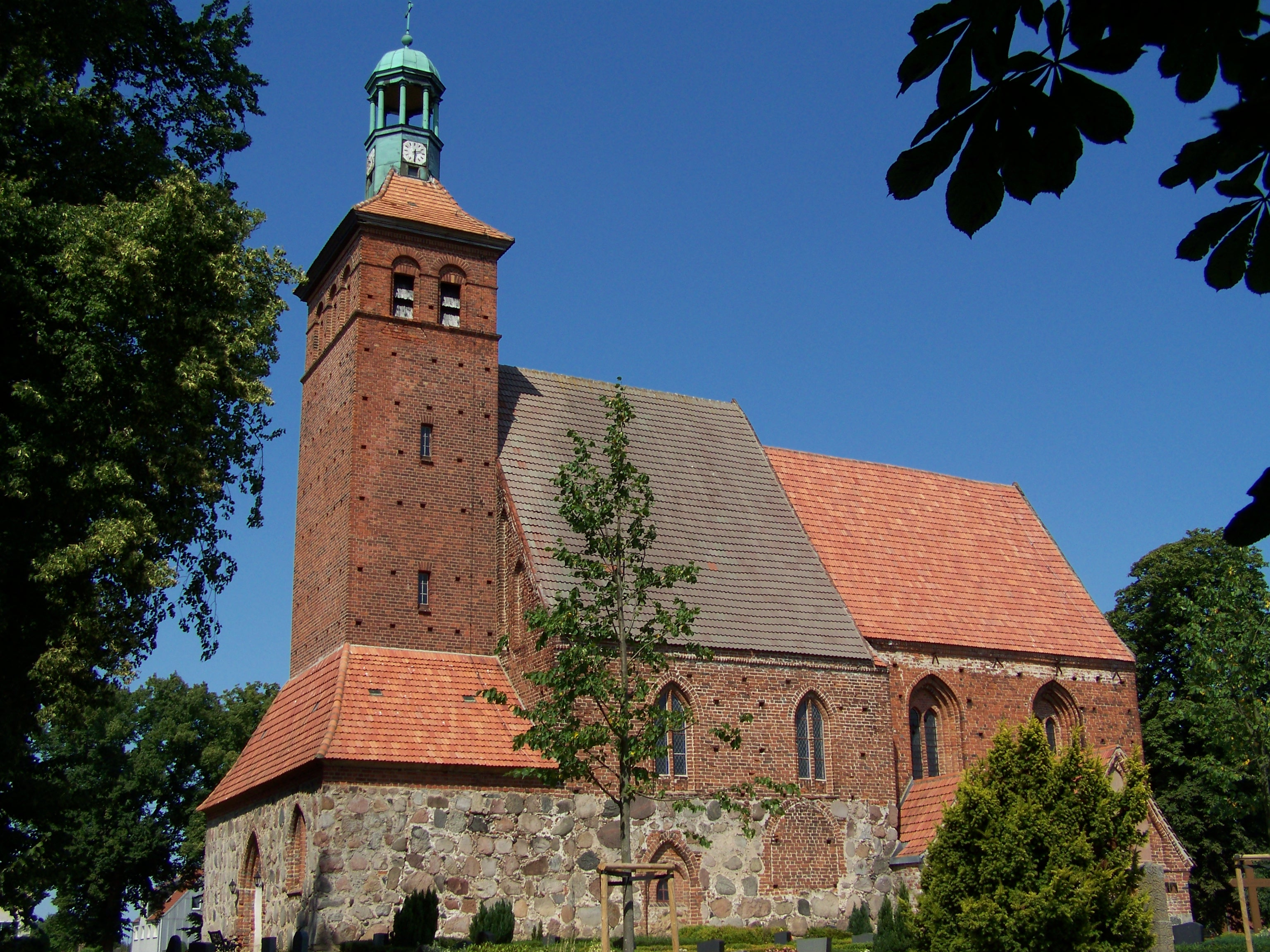
- Church
- Interactive map of Miltzow
- Location within Germany Location within Mecklenburg-Vorpommern
- Coordinates: 54°12′N 13°13′E
- Country: Germany
- State: Mecklenburg-Vorpommern
- District: Vorpommern-Rügen
- Town: Sundhagen

Area
  - Total: 24.09 km^{2} (9.30 sq mi)
- Elevation: 0.5 m (1.6 ft)

Population (2006-12-31)
  - Total: 1,394
  - Density: 57.87/km^{2} (149.9/sq mi)
- Time zone: UTC+01:00 (CET)
  - Summer (DST): UTC+02:00 (CEST)
- Postal codes: 18519
- Dialling codes: 038328
- Vehicle registration: NVP
- Website: www.amt-miltzow.de

Miltzow is a village and a former municipality in the Vorpommern-Rügen district, in Mecklenburg-Vorpommern, Germany. Since 7 June 2009, it is part of the Sundhagen municipality.

== Transport ==
Miltzow railway station connects Miltzow with Stralsund, Greifswald, Züssow, Usedom, Angermünde, Eberswalde and Berlin.
