= Kirchdorf, Mecklenburg-Vorpommern =

Kirchdorf
- Ortsteil of Sundhagen
- Interactive map of Kirchdorf
- Location within Germany Location within Mecklenburg-Vorpommern
- Coordinates: 54°11′N 13°17′E
- Country: Germany
- State: Mecklenburg-Vorpommern
- District: Vorpommern-Rügen
- Town: Sundhagen

Area
  - Total: 18.77 km^{2} (7.25 sq mi)
- Elevation: 17 m (56 ft)

Population (2006-12-31)
  - Total: 590
  - Density: 31/km^{2} (81/sq mi)
- Time zone: UTC+01:00 (CET)
  - Summer (DST): UTC+02:00 (CEST)
- Postal codes: 18519
- Dialling codes: 038351
- Vehicle registration: NVP

Kirchdorf (German pronunciation: [ˈkɪʁçdɔʁf]) is a village and a former municipality in the Vorpommern-Rügen district, in Mecklenburg-Vorpommern, Germany. Since 7 June 2009, it is part of the Sundhagen municipality.
