= Bay of Greifswald =

Basin in the German coast of the Baltic Sea

Coordinates: 54°13′22″N 13°32′48″E

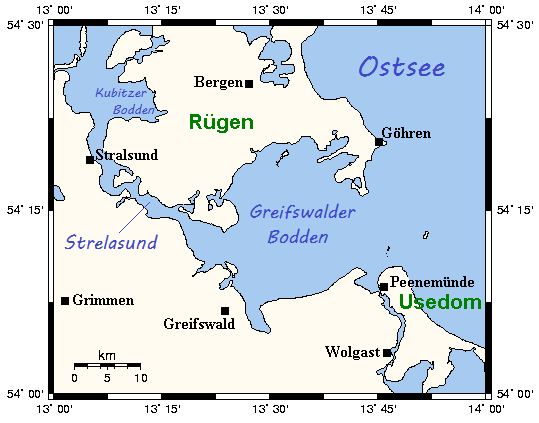
Greifswalder Bodden in the center of the map

The Bay of Greifswald or Greifswald Bodden (German: Greifswalder Bodden) is a basin in the southwestern Baltic Sea, off the shores of Germany in the state of Mecklenburg-Vorpommern. With an area of 514 km², it is the largest Bodden of the German Baltic coast. The bay's main port is Greifswald.

To the west is the island of Rügen; to the southeast, the island of Usedom; to the east, the Bay of Pomerania, and to the south, the German mainland. The bay is also joined to the Baltic Sea through the Strelasund, a narrow sound separating Rügen from the mainland. The bay's northern end is sometimes called the Rügischer Bodden.

The bay itself has a heavily indented coastline, making it a bay of bays. The headlands of Mönchgut (in east Rügen) and Zudar (in south Rügen) – the former actually being made up of several peninsulae – subdivide the bay into many smaller bays. Amongst the islands in the east of the bodden are Vilm, Koos, Riems and the former island of Stubber, now a sandbank.

The Bay of Greifswald is quite shallow, with an average depth of 5.6 m, and a maximum depth of 13.5 m. Its water is brackish rather than briny owing to inflow from rivers, and the Baltic Sea's complex hydrography (saltier water is generally found only at greater depths there). The average salinity is at 7 to 8 psu, ranging from 5.3 and 12.2 psu.

Before German reunification in 1990, the Bay of Greifswald was a public watersports venue, unlike most of East Germany's Baltic coast. The local geography made it easy to keep watch over the bay, thereby thwarting those who thought to use it to flee the country. The place outside the Warsaw Pact nearest the bay was the Danish island of Bornholm, more than 100 km away.

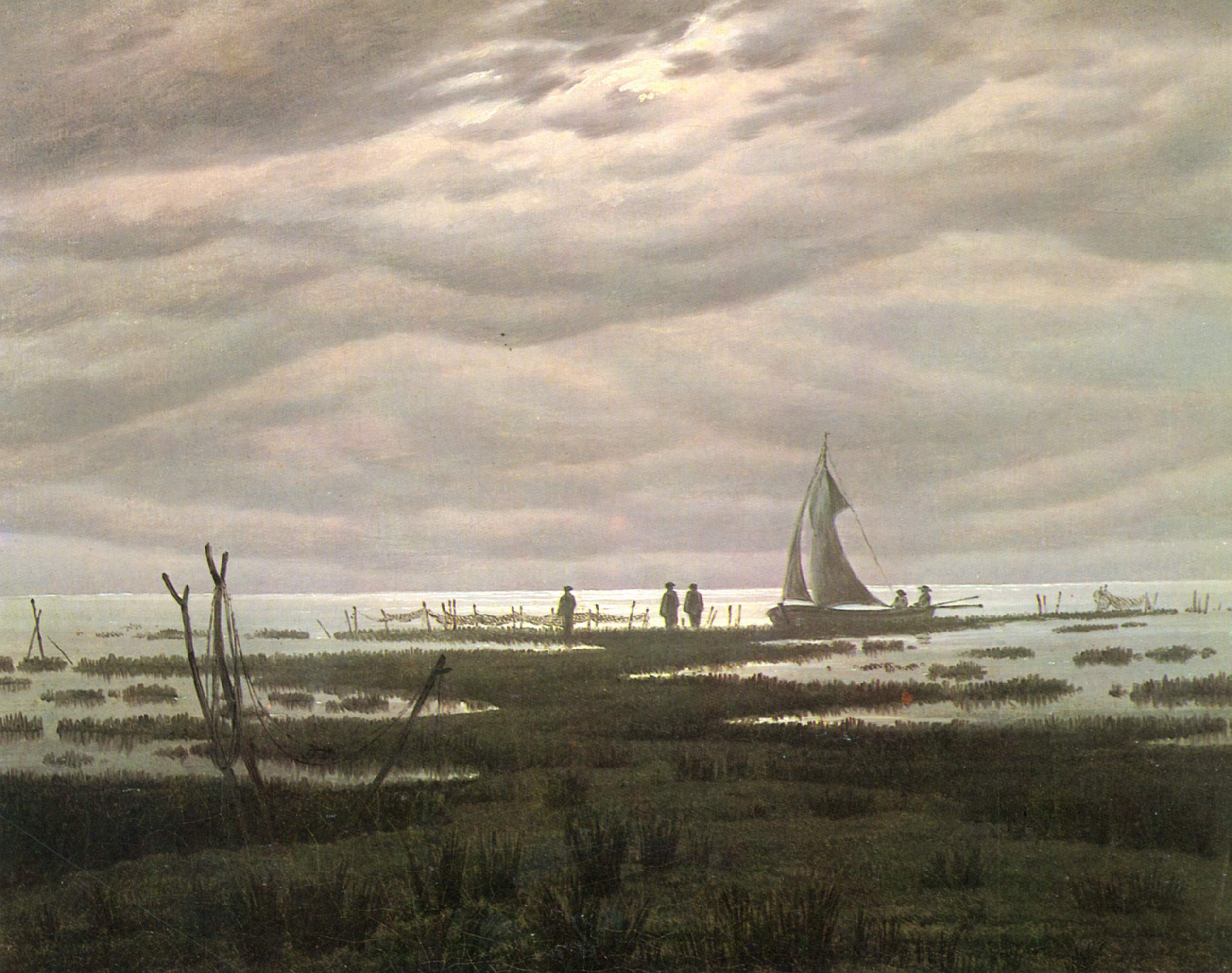
Flachlandschaft am Greifswalder Bodden (Flat Landscape on the Bay of Greifswald), Caspar David Friedrich, about 1830-1834

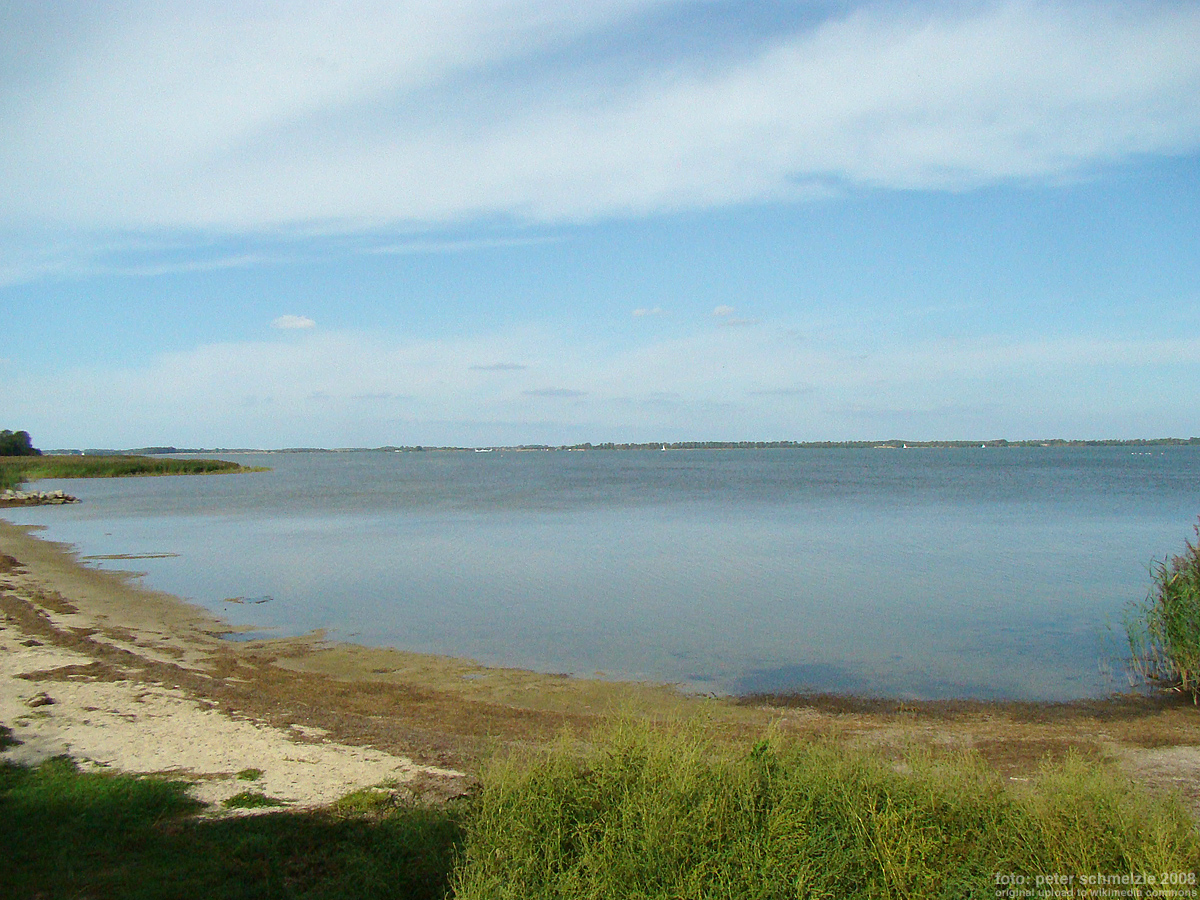
The Bodden seen from Sundhagen

== See also ==
- Nord Stream 1 gas pipeline project
