= Sundhagen =

- Municipality
- Location of Sundhagen within Vorpommern-Rügen district
- Interactive map of Sundhagen
- Location within Germany Location within Mecklenburg-Vorpommern
- Coordinates: 54°12′N 13°13′E
- Country: Germany
- State: Mecklenburg-Vorpommern
- District: Vorpommern-Rügen
- Municipal assoc.: Miltzow

Area
  - Total: 159.77 km^{2} (61.69 sq mi)
- Elevation: 0.5 m (1.6 ft)

Population (2025-12-31)
  - Total: 5,077
  - Density: 31.78/km^{2} (82.30/sq mi)
- Time zone: UTC+01:00 (CET)
  - Summer (DST): UTC+02:00 (CEST)
- Postal codes: 18510, 18519
- Dialling codes: 038328, 038333, 038351
- Vehicle registration: NVP
- Website: www.gemeinde-sundhagen.de

Sundhagen (German pronunciation: [zʊntˈhaːɡn̩]) is a municipality in Mecklenburg-Vorpommern, Germany, located in Amt Miltzow in the district of Vorpommern-Rügen. Sundhagen was constituted on 7 June 2009 by the fusion of the following municipalities:

- Behnkendorf
- Brandshagen
- Horst
- Kirchdorf
- Miltzow
- Reinberg
- Wilmshagen

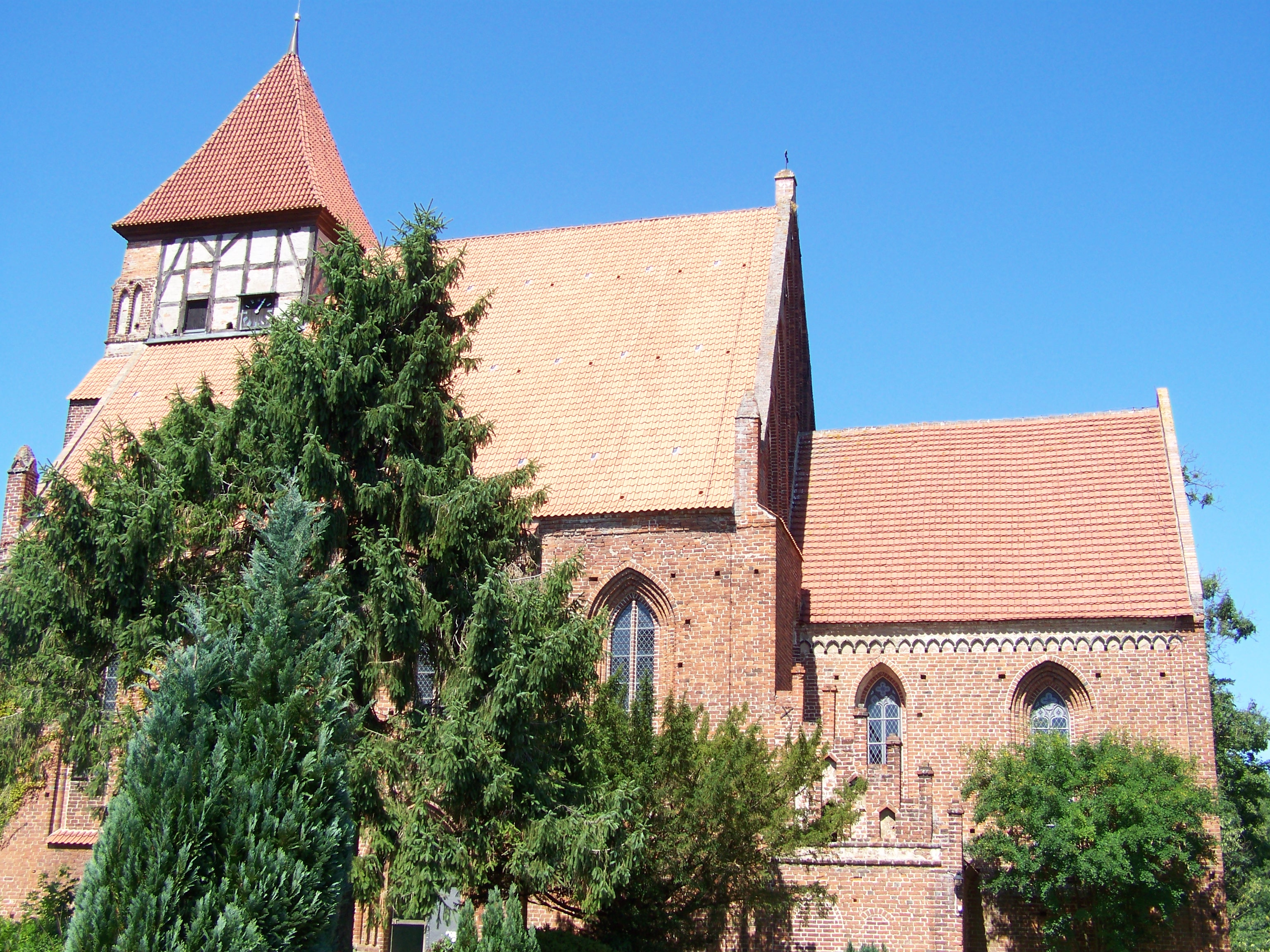
Brandshagen church
