= Brandshagen =

- Ortsteil of Sundhagen
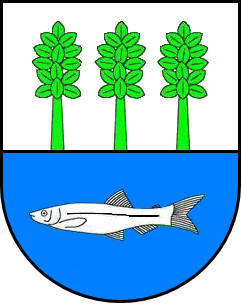
- Coat of arms
- Interactive map of Brandshagen
- Location within Germany Location within Mecklenburg-Vorpommern
- Coordinates: 54°15′N 13°11′E
- Country: Germany
- State: Mecklenburg-Vorpommern
- District: Vorpommern-Rügen
- Town: Sundhagen

Area
  - Total: 24.04 km^{2} (9.28 sq mi)
- Elevation: 3 m (9.8 ft)

Population (2006-12-31)
  - Total: 1,264
  - Density: 52.58/km^{2} (136.2/sq mi)
- Time zone: UTC+01:00 (CET)
  - Summer (DST): UTC+02:00 (CEST)
- Postal codes: 18519
- Dialling codes: 038328
- Vehicle registration: NVP
- Website: www.brandshagen.de

Brandshagen is a village and a former municipality in the Vorpommern-Rügen district, in Mecklenburg-Vorpommern, Germany. It is located on the Pomeranian mainland opposite the island of Rügen.

It was named after Borante, an early member of the House of Putbus, who built a motte-and-bailey castle in the 13th century which has been proved by excavations. Hag(en) is an old word for an area enclosed or fenced in by a hedge (like The Hague).

Since 7 June 2009, it is part of the Sundhagen municipality.

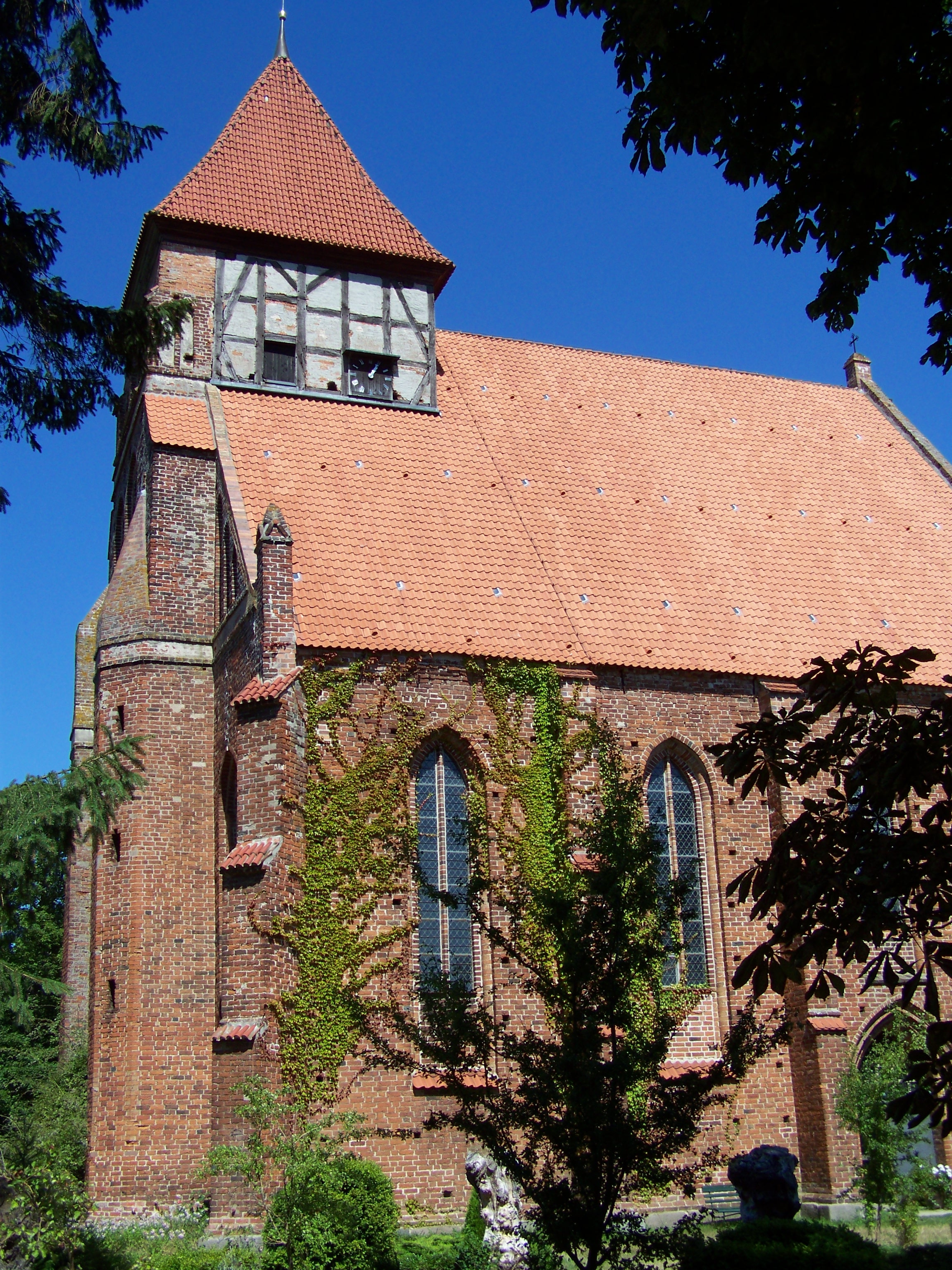
Dorfkirche
