= Wilmshagen (Sundhagen) =

- Ortsteil of Sundhagen
- Interactive map of Wilmshagen
- Location within Germany Location within Mecklenburg-Vorpommern
- Coordinates: 54°10′N 13°10′E
- Country: Germany
- State: Mecklenburg-Vorpommern
- District: Vorpommern-Rügen
- Town: Sundhagen

Area
  - Total: 18.58 km^{2} (7.17 sq mi)
- Elevation: 1 m (3.3 ft)

Population (2006-12-31)
  - Total: 293
  - Density: 15.8/km^{2} (40.8/sq mi)
- Time zone: UTC+01:00 (CET)
  - Summer (DST): UTC+02:00 (CEST)
- Postal codes: 18519
- Dialling codes: 038333
- Vehicle registration: NVP
- Website: www.amt-miltzow.de

Wilmshagen is a village and a former municipality in the Vorpommern-Rügen district, in Mecklenburg-Vorpommern, Germany. Since 7 June 2009, it is part of the Sundhagen municipality.
