= Glacial erratics on and around Rügen =

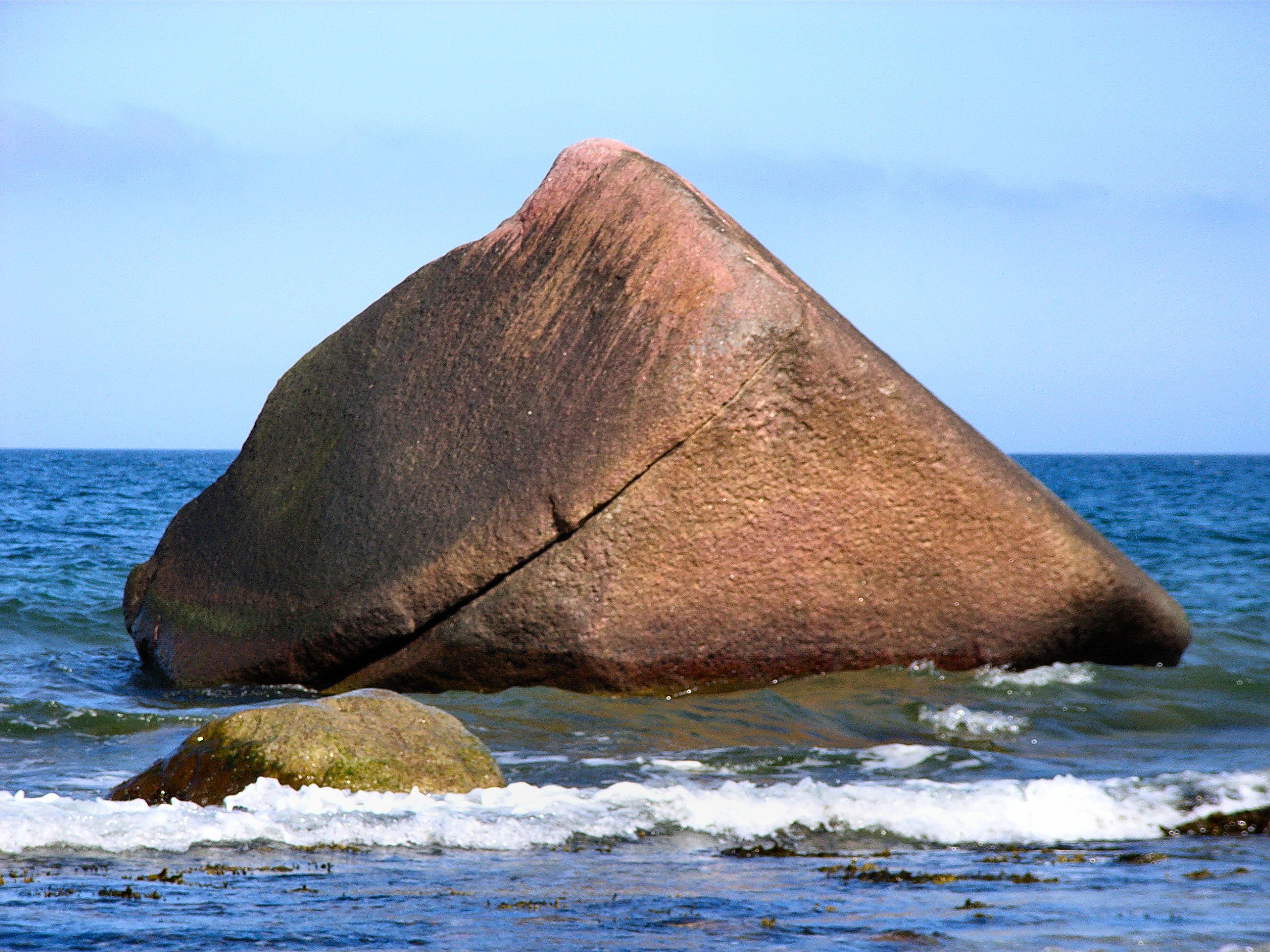
The Schwanenstein off Lohme

This is a list of erratics on and around Rügen – the largest island off the Baltic coast of Germany. An erratic is usually defined (in Germany) as an individual block of rock lying on the surface of the land which has a volume of at least one cubic metre and which was transported by a glacier to its present site during the ice age.

Before the establishment of ice age theories, many stories and legends were woven around the giant "erratic blocks" of rock. On Rügen, there are a lot of interesting large erratics due to the particular location of the island during the ice ages and due to continuous coastal erosion. In the New Stone Age people built megalithic tombs out of erratics. On Rügen many of these have survived. Until the 19th century large erratics were used as quarries, in order to produce construction material for monuments (e.g. in 1854 the Prussia Columns near Neukamp and Groß Stresow or for the Ernst Moritz Arndt Tower on the Rugard, for coastal and harbour defences, cobblestones and millstones. Many erratics fell victim to the development of Rügen. Today erratics are seen as natural monuments that are worth keeping and have a greater significance.

Data on the largest erratics on Rügen is given in the table below. Further information may be found on the individual article pages.

== General ==
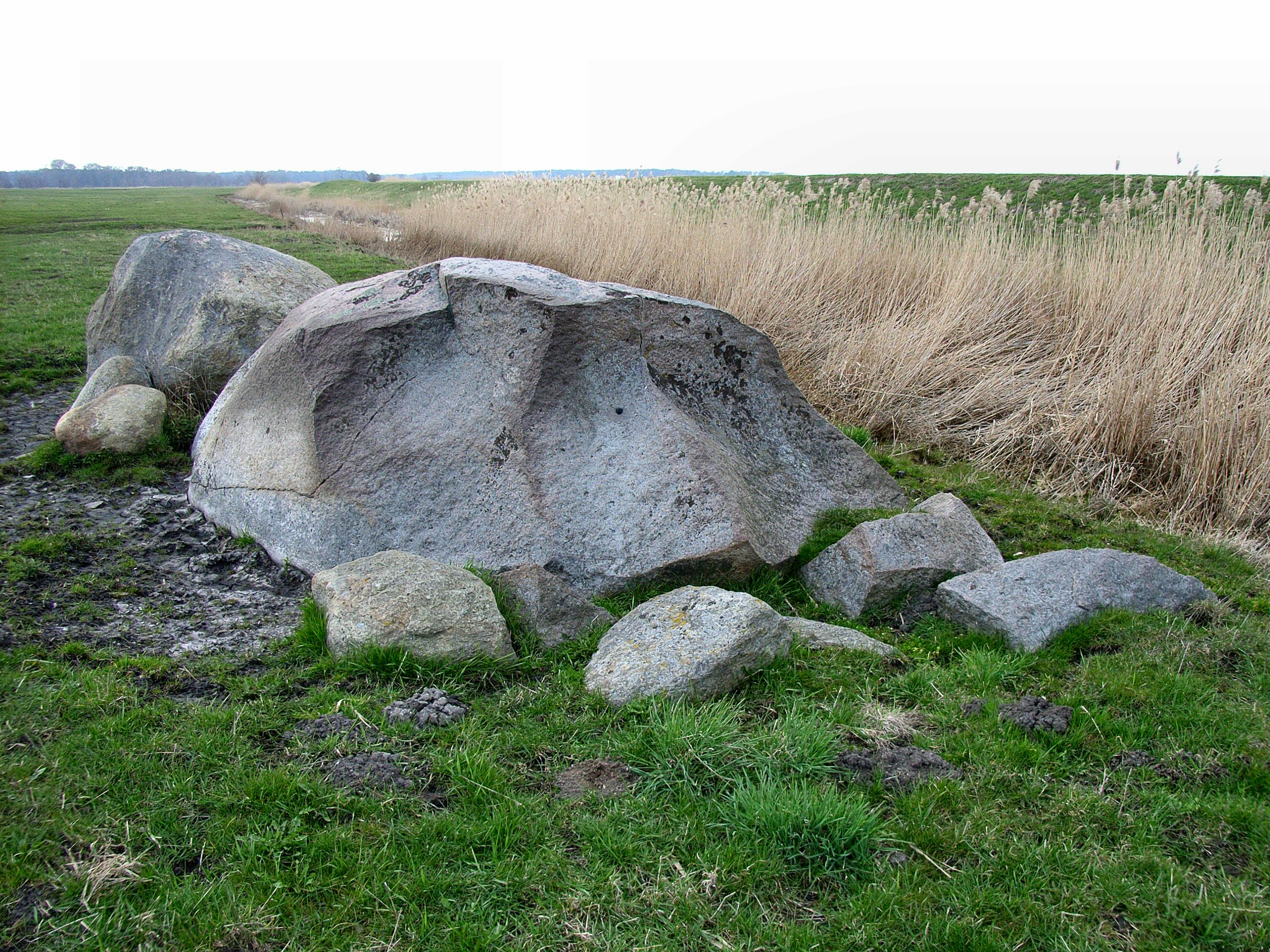
The Möwenstein on the island of Ummanz

On the Baltic Sea island of Rügen and in its immediate vicinity there are a lot of particularly large erratics. There are two reasons for this. On the one hand, Rügen (especially the Jasmund peninsula) was the ice divide between the Belt and the Oderstrom glaciers of the Weichselian glaciation and, as a result, a band of debris typical of a medial moraine developed here. On the other hand, erratics have been exposed by coastal erosion (especially by the action of breakers) and may be found on beaches at the foot of sea cliffs. They were deposited here over the course of time from the layer of glacial till that was deposited in many places on top of the thick layer of chalk during the ice age. The main direction of the glacial stream came from the island of Bornholm, relatively close by, which is why several of the larger erratics on Rügen come from there.

Erratics, whose area of origin can be determined from their internal structure and composition, are called indicator stones. The origin can be determined by information in the literature on glacial drifts, but also determined by comparison with samples from the bedrock. For Rügen there is a Nordic Collection at the Ernst Moritz Arndt University of Greifswald. By determining the origin of these large boulders, the directions of the individual glacial streams may be determined.

Such erratics on Rügen, which are made of crystalline and metamorphic rock, that have a minimum volume of 10 m³ belong to the legally protected geotopes on the island. For most erratics, however the volume cannot be exactly worked out, because they are normally partly embedded in the ground. The sizes given in the list are based on estimates by the majority of geologists given in their publications. In addition the list shows the estimated above-ground volumes; the below-ground element is not recorded. The approximation factor of 0.6 is based on experience and accounts for the usual difference in volume from a rectangular block.

== Table ==
Ranking	Geotope name	Volume/(above ground)^{1)}	Mass	Geotope G2^{2)}	Location
1.	Buskam	600 m³ (206 m³)	1600 t	83	in the water - near Göhren 350 m from the shore (north beach /east) in the Baltic Sea
2.	Nardevitz Erratic	104 m³ (71 m³)	281 t	75	on land - 400 m north of Nardevitz on the field, in bushes
3.	Blandow Erratic	65 m³ (54.5 m³)	175 t	81	in the water - from Blandow (bus stop), parish of Lohme, path to the beach and from there ca. 200 m east
4.	Siebenschneiderstein	61 m³ (32.5 m³)	165 t	68	on land - at the Gellort, 1 km northwest of Cape Arkona
5.	Schwanenstein	60 m³ (54 m³)	162 t	73	in the water - 100 m east of the harbour at Lohme
6.	Uskam (Klein Helgoland)	41 m³ (40.5 m³)	110 t	66	in the water - 370 m east-northeast of the Sassnitz spa centre, 15 m from the shore
7.	Jastor	34 m³ (32.5 m³)	91 t	537	on land – by the access road to the new Sassnitz Ferry Port
8.	Quoltitz Sacrifice Rock	27 m³ (14.5 m³)	73 t	72	on land - 1 km northeast of the abandoned village of Quoltitz in front of the nature reserve to the left under trees
9.	Jasmund Erratic	27 m³ (21 m³)	73 t	82	on land - Jasmund National Park, on the beach between Kollicker Ort and Kollicker Bach
10.	Möwenstein (Ummanz)	27 m³ (13.5 m³)	73 t	91	on land - near Tankow on the island of Ummanz immediately behind the dyke on the grassland (bird reserve!)

^{1)} Measurement based on the above-ground element based on the formula "length × width × height × 0.6 " (0.6 is an approximation factor)
^{2)} The legally-protected geotopes in Mecklenburg-Vorpommern are indexed by the State Office for the Environment, Conservation and Geology (Landesamt für Umwelt, Naturschutz und Geologie) in a land registry. They are designated with the prefix "G2" followed by their individual index number.

== Erratics on land ==
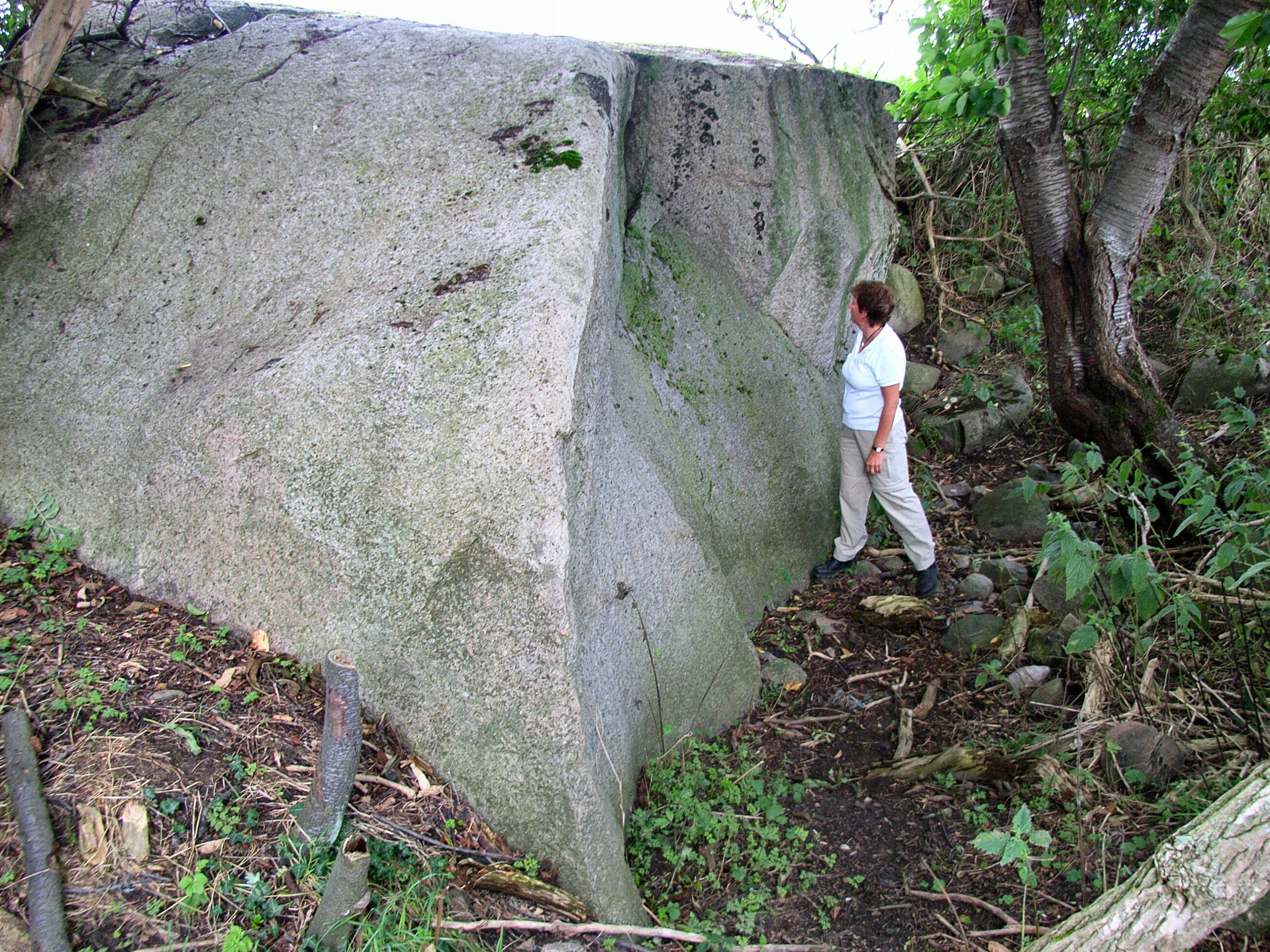
The Nardevitz Erratic

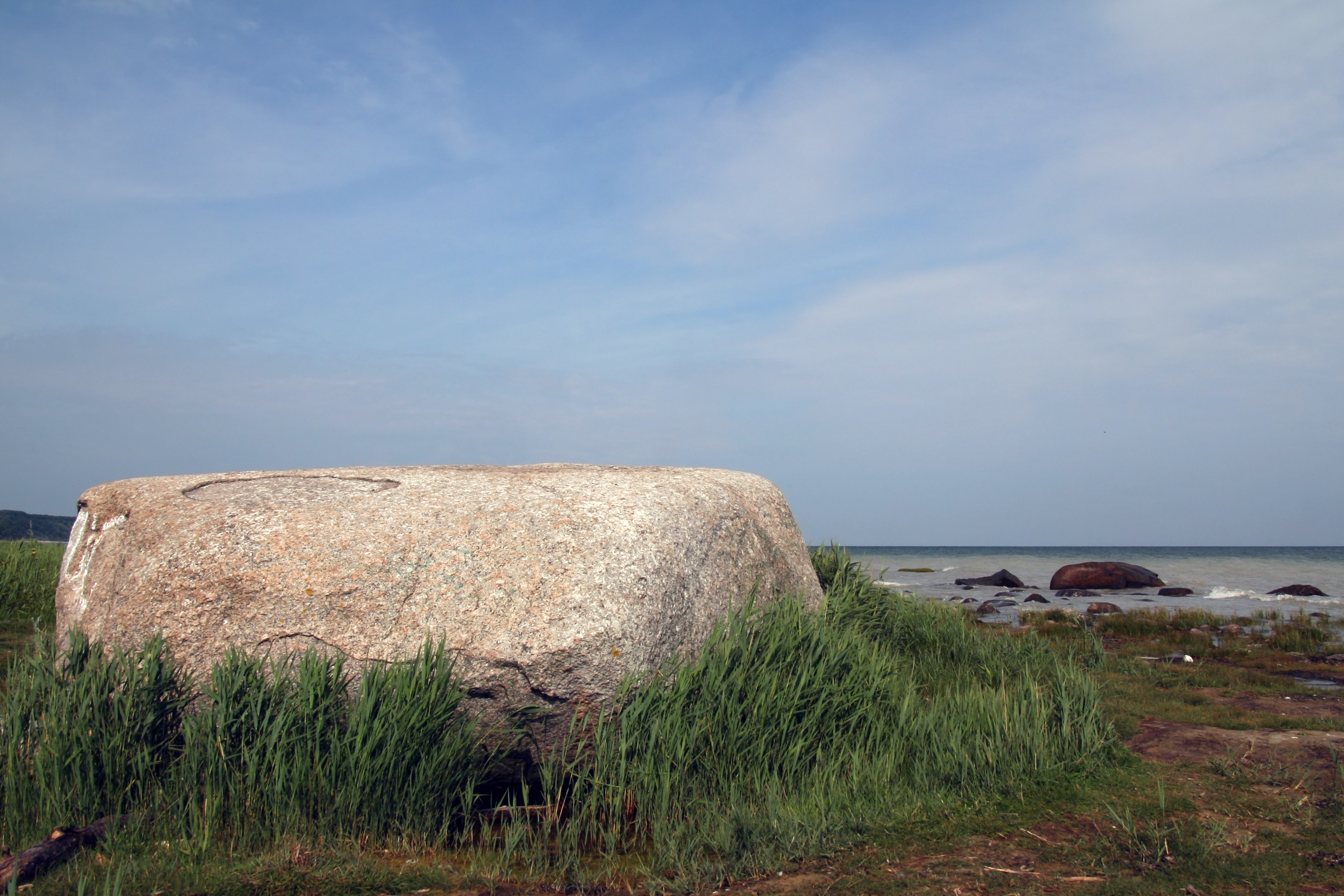
The Siebenschneiderstein

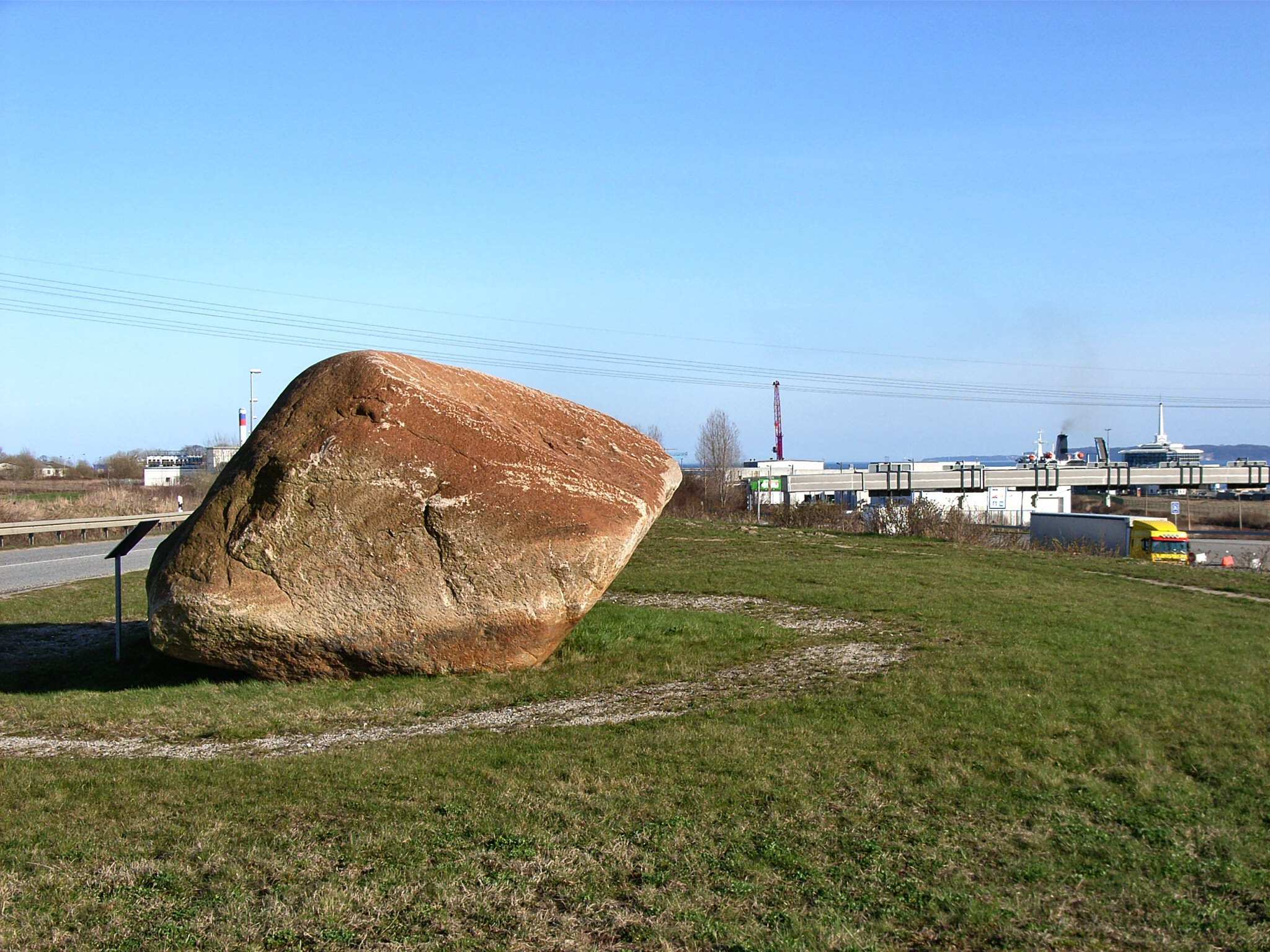
The Jastor near Saßnitz

== Erratics in the water ==
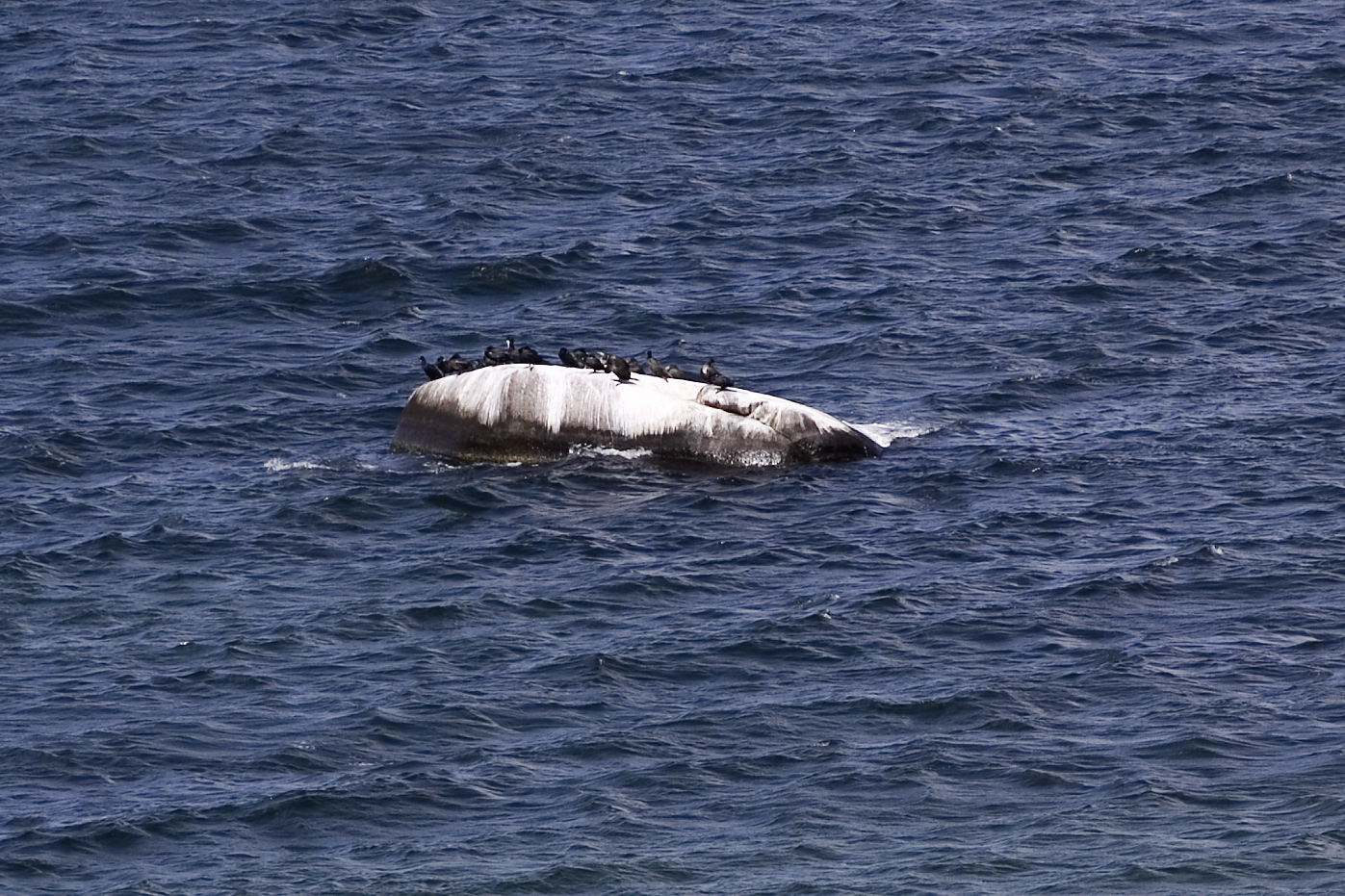
The Buskam near Göhren

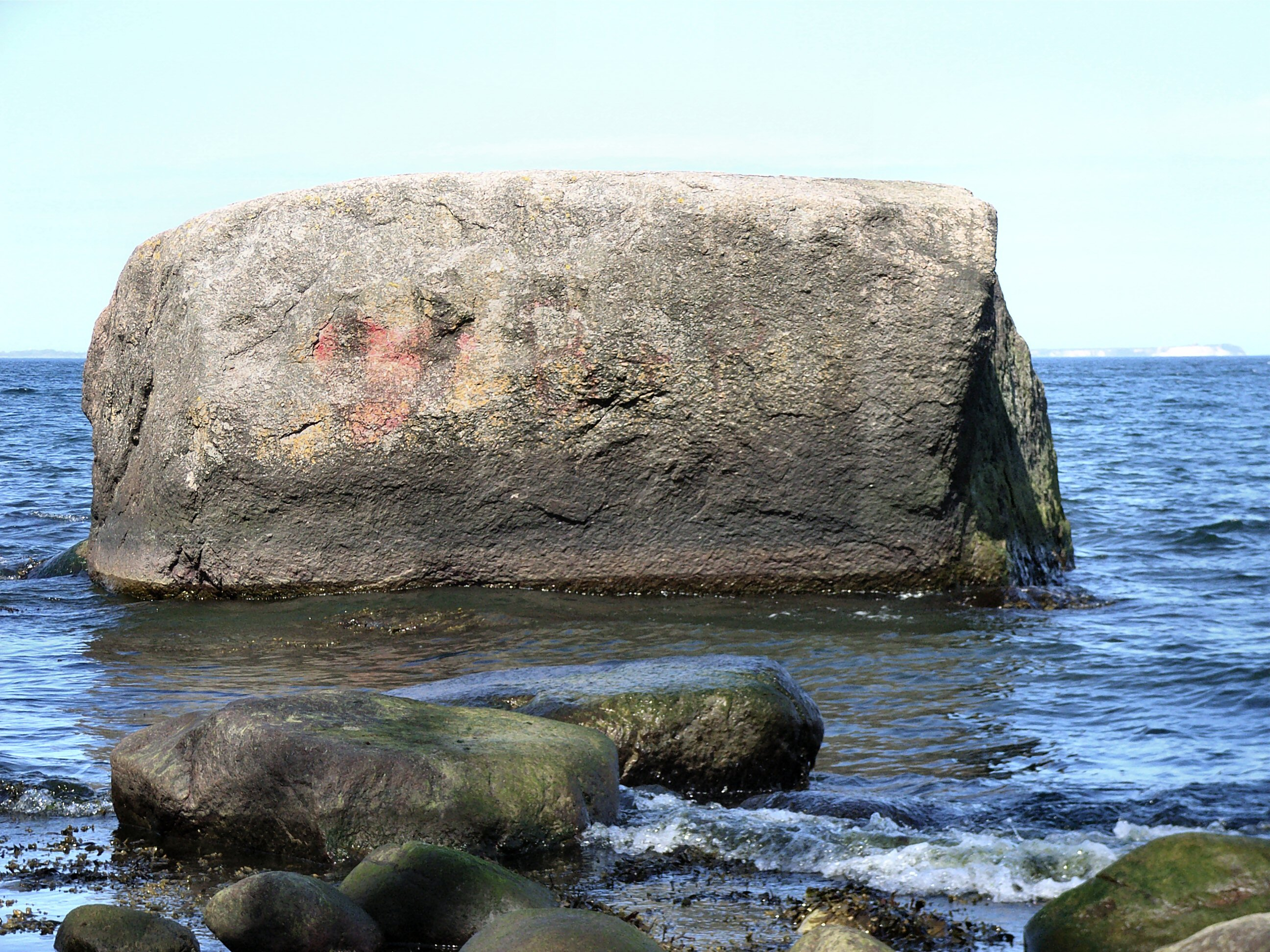
The Blandow Erratic near Blandow (parish of Lohme)

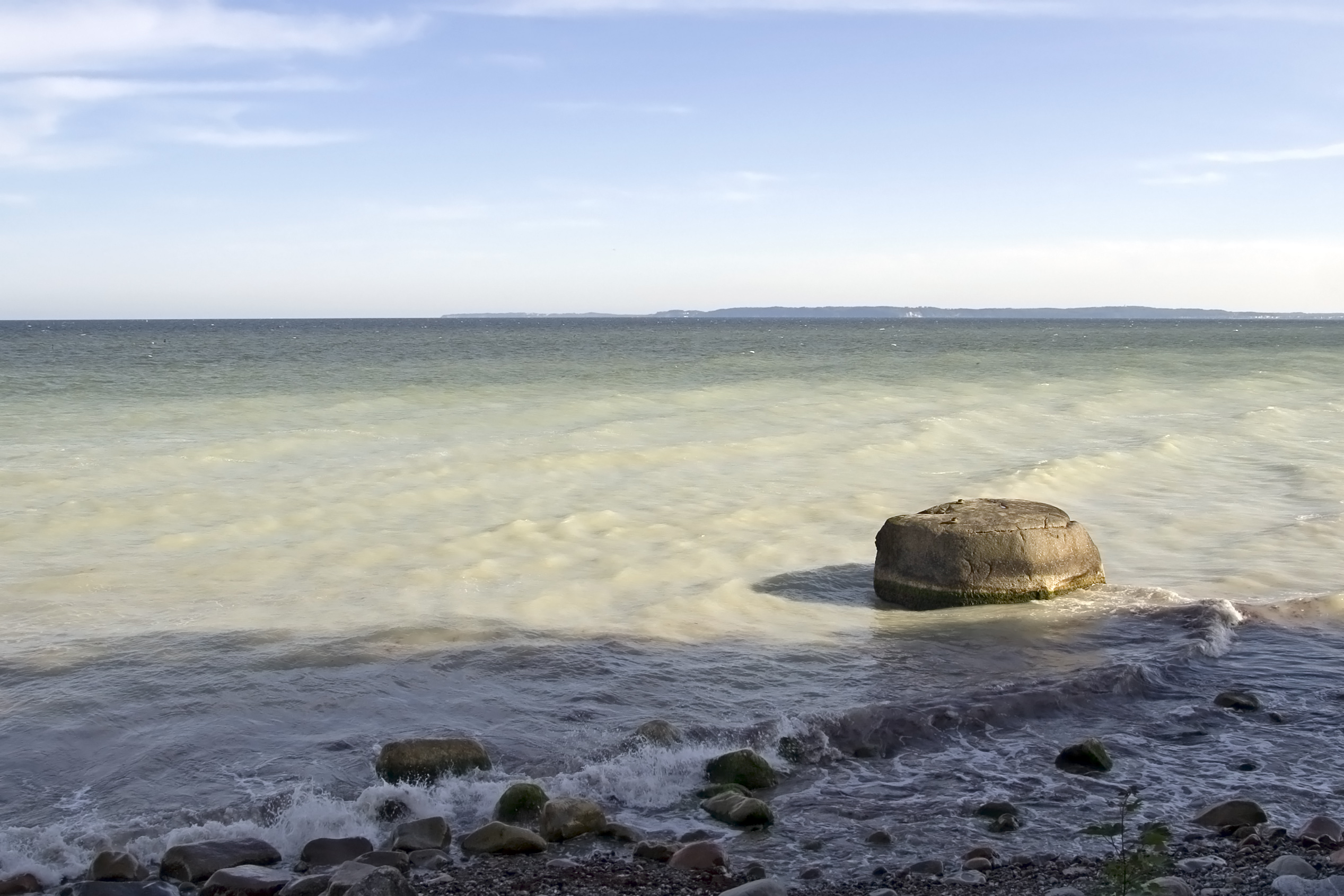
The Uskam off Saßnitz

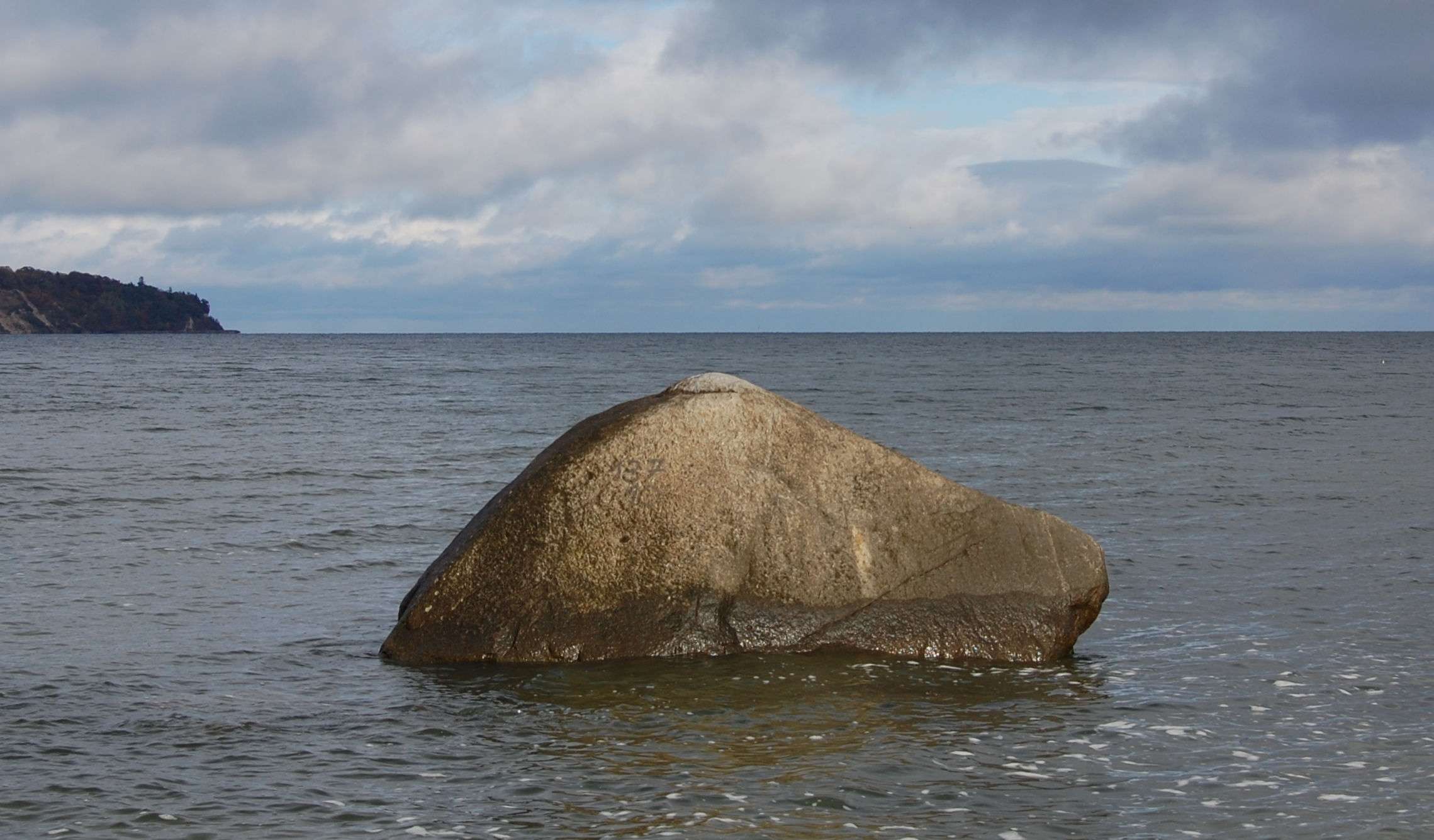
The Fritz Worm Rock off Lobbe

== See also ==
- Glacial series
- List of individual rocks

== Literature ==
- Christian Svenson: Geschützte erratics der Insel Rügen. Landesamt für Umwelt, Naturschutz und Geologie, Mecklenburg-Vorpommern, Güstrow 2005, (fachliche Kompetenz: Institut für Geographie und Geologie, Ernst-Moritz-Arndt-Universität Greifswald).
- Bernward Wember Große Steine auf Rügen: Steinmythos und Megalithkultur. Eine Schatzkammer der Steinzeit. Reprint-Verlag Rügen 2007, ISBN 978-3-939915-00-3
