= Nardevitz Erratic =

Coordinates: 54°34′46″N 13°34′9″E

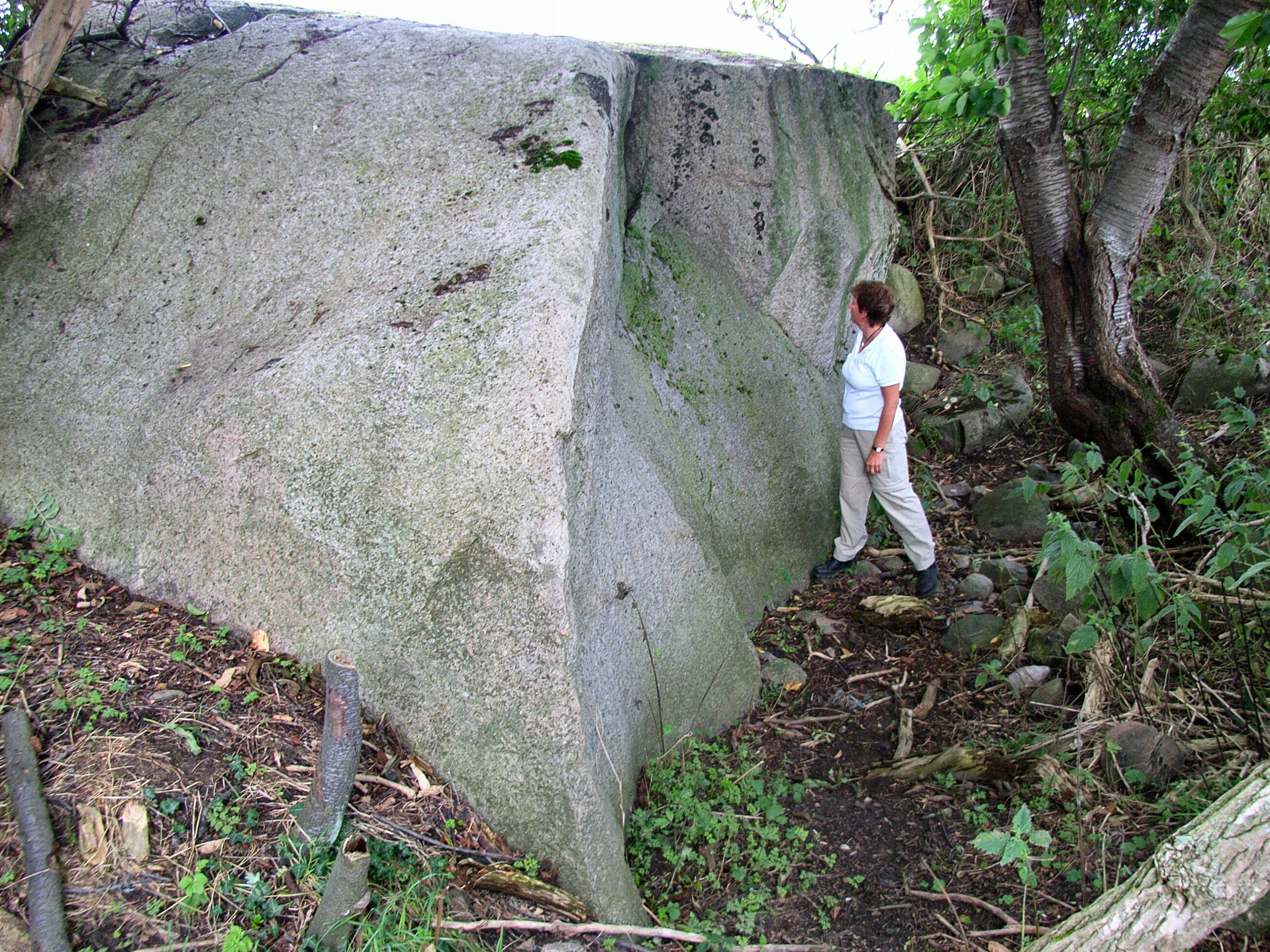
The Nardevitz erratic rises more than 3 metres above the ground

The Nardevitz Erratic (German: Findling Nardevitz), also called the Great Rock of Nardewitz (Großer Stein von Nardevitz), is one of the largest glacial erratics in North Germany. It lies about 400 metres north of Nardevitz, a village in the parish of Lohme on the island of Rügen. Surrounded by trees and bushes as well as other drift material that was in the way of farming, it lies in the middle of a field. Its volume is estimated at 104 m³, which gives it a mass of 281 tonnes. The above-ground portion has a volume of 71 m³. It is therefore, apart from Buskam which lies in the Baltic Sea off Göhren, the largest erratic on Rügen and an important geological sight.

Because the Nardevitz Erratic was used for a long time to obtain construction material, it is suspected today that it was once three times its present size. For example, in 1854 and 1855, column drums weighing about five tonne and pedestal blocks, up to 2 tonnes in weight, for the Prussian Columns near Neukamp and Groß Stresow were hewn from the rock. On the rock itself there are clear traces that show there were plans for further destruction of the erratic.

Today the Nardevitz Rock, like around 20 other erratics on the island of Rügen, is one of its legally-protected geotopes. It is recorded in the relevant register at the Mecklenburg-Vorpommern State Office for the Environment, Conservation and Geology (Landesamt für Umwelt, Naturschutz und Geologie Mecklenburg-Vorpommern) as entry "G2 75".

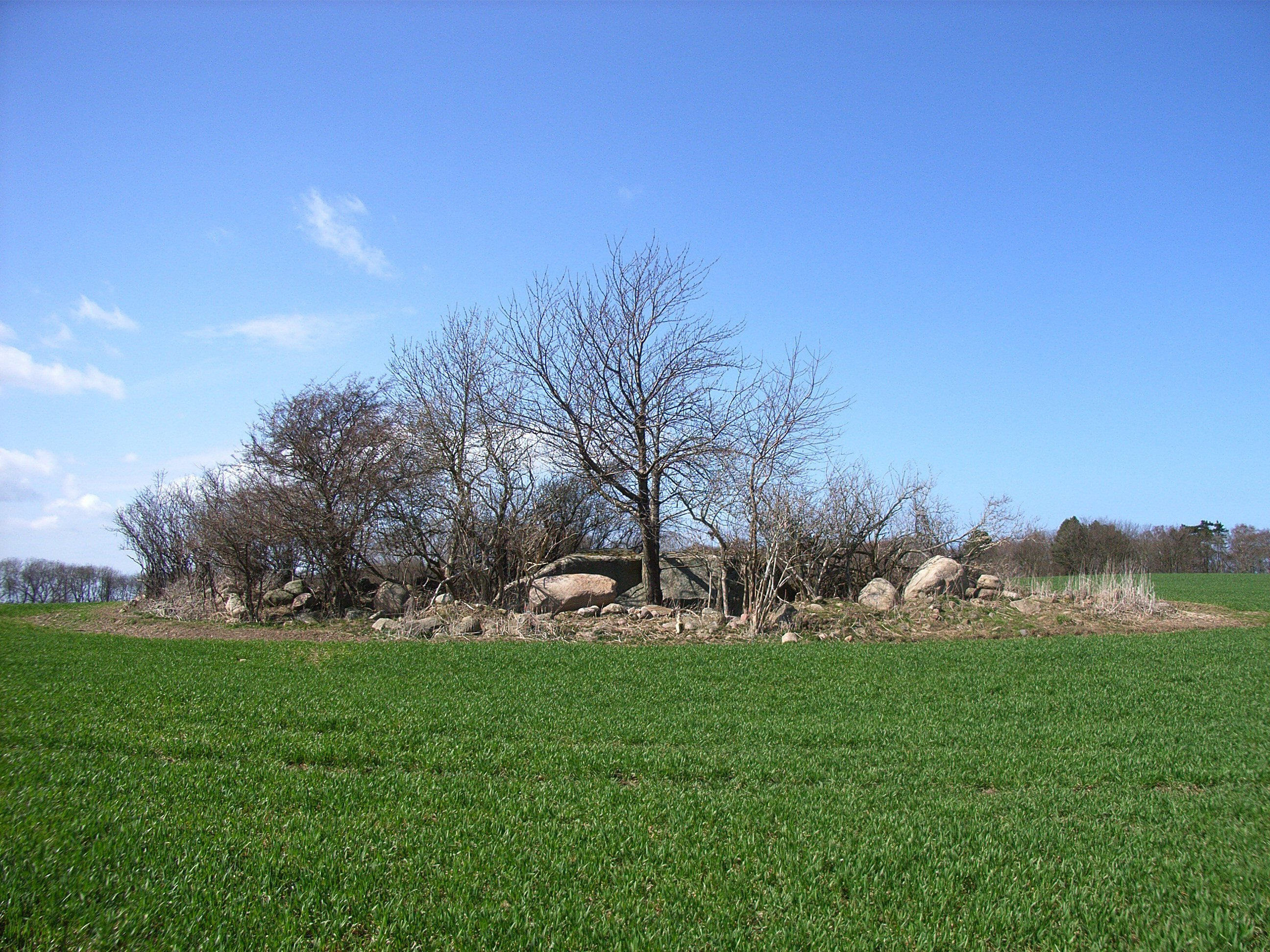
The Nardevitz Erratic is surrounded by farmland

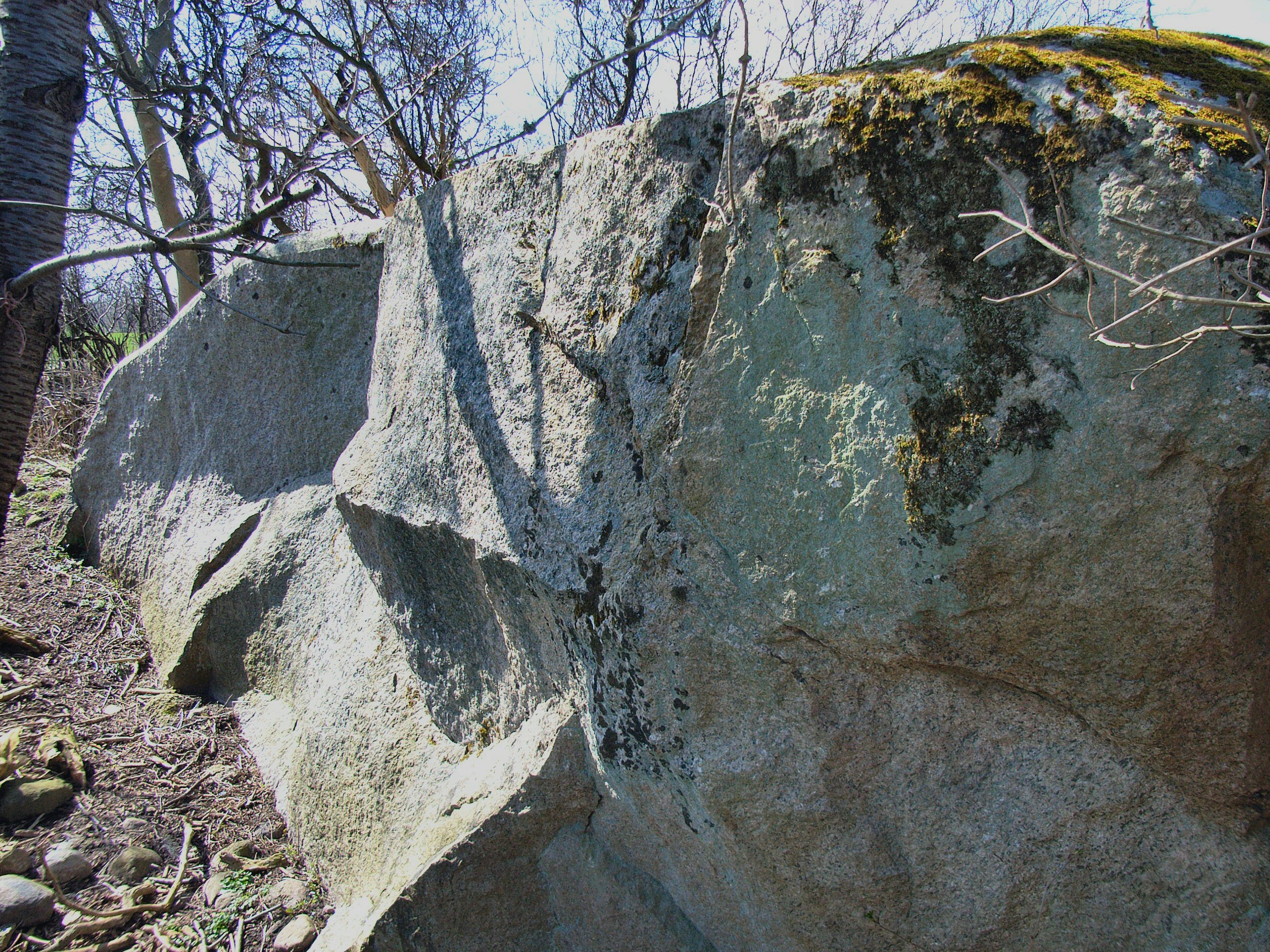
It acted for a long time as a "quarry"

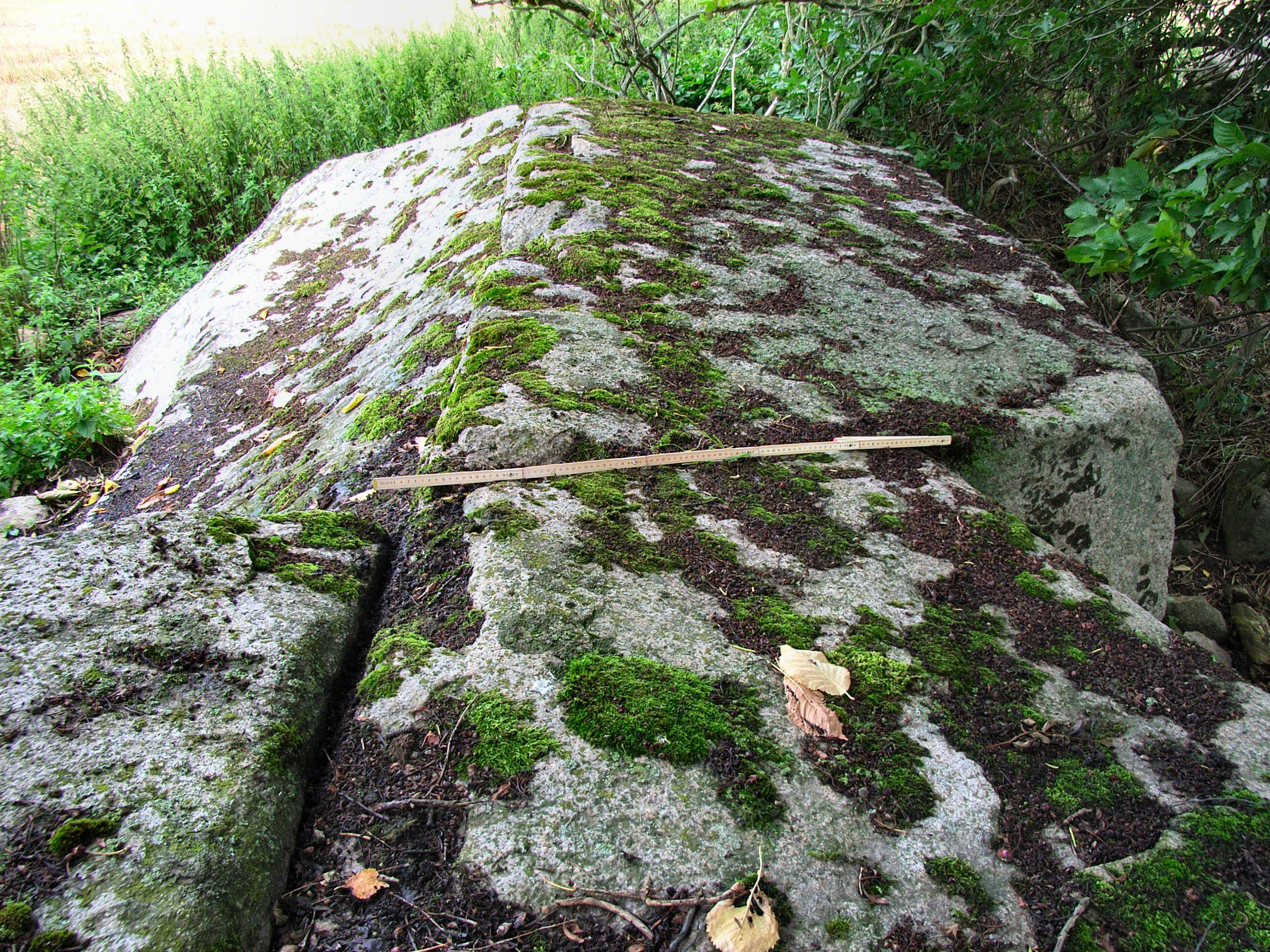
Its surface shows old traces of further attempts at breaking it up

== Origin and geological features ==
The Nardevitz Erratic is made of granite, whose coarse-grained structure corresponds to the hammer granite bedrock found on the island of Bornholm. Its potassium feldspar spars are brownish-grey to pale red and up to 1.5 centimetres across. The up to five millimetre wide quartz crystals have a brownish tinge.

== See also ==
- Erratics on and around Rügen

== Literature ==
- Landesamt für Umwelt, Naturschutz und Geologie Mecklenburg-Vorpommern (ed.): Geschützte Findlinge der Insel Rügen. Greifswald 2005, p. 17.
