= Siebenschneiderstein =

Glacial erratic on Rügen, Germany

Coordinates: 54°41′05.4″N 13°25′41.4″E

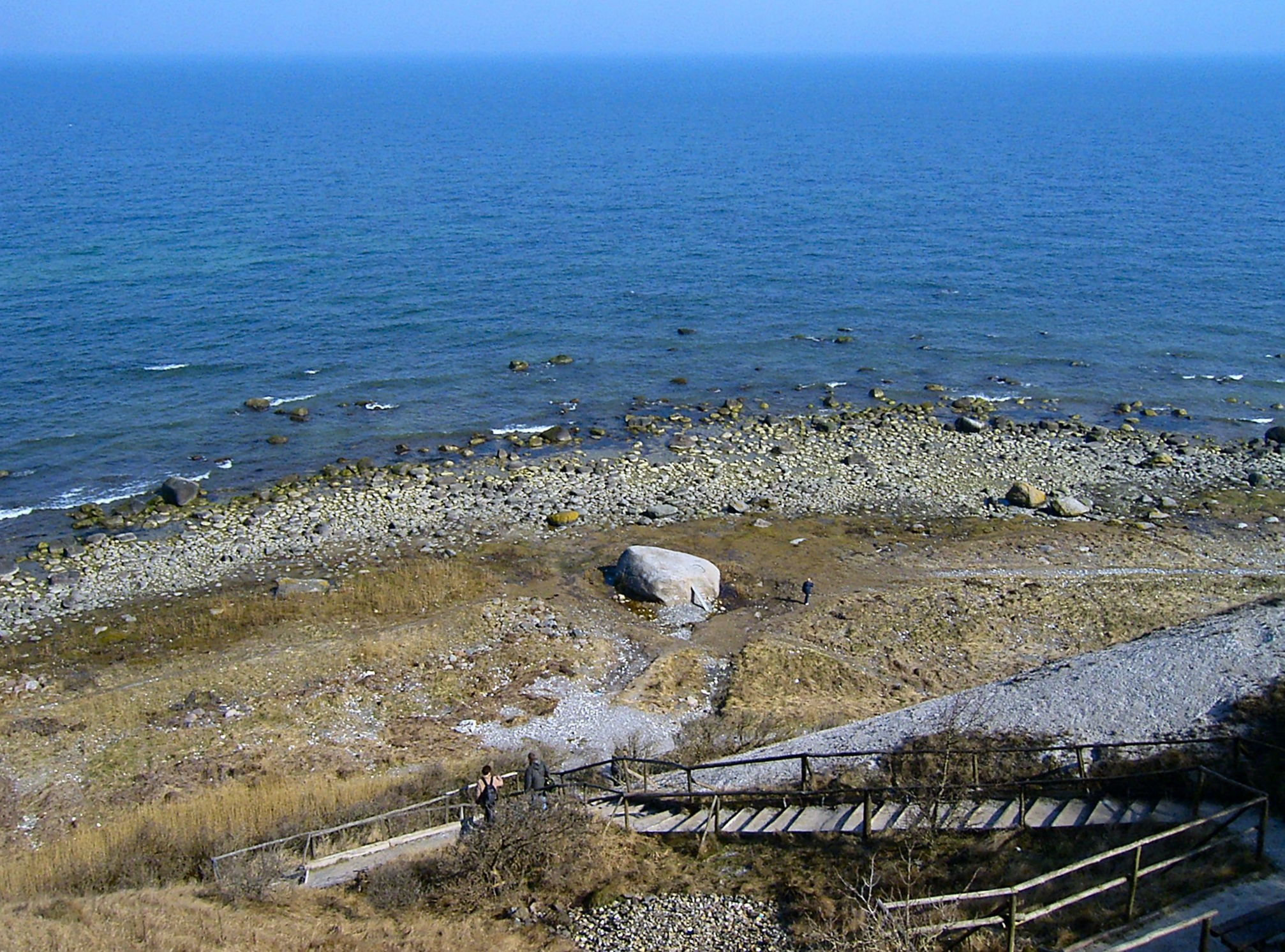
Gellort, the northern tip of Rügen with the Siebenschneiderstein rock

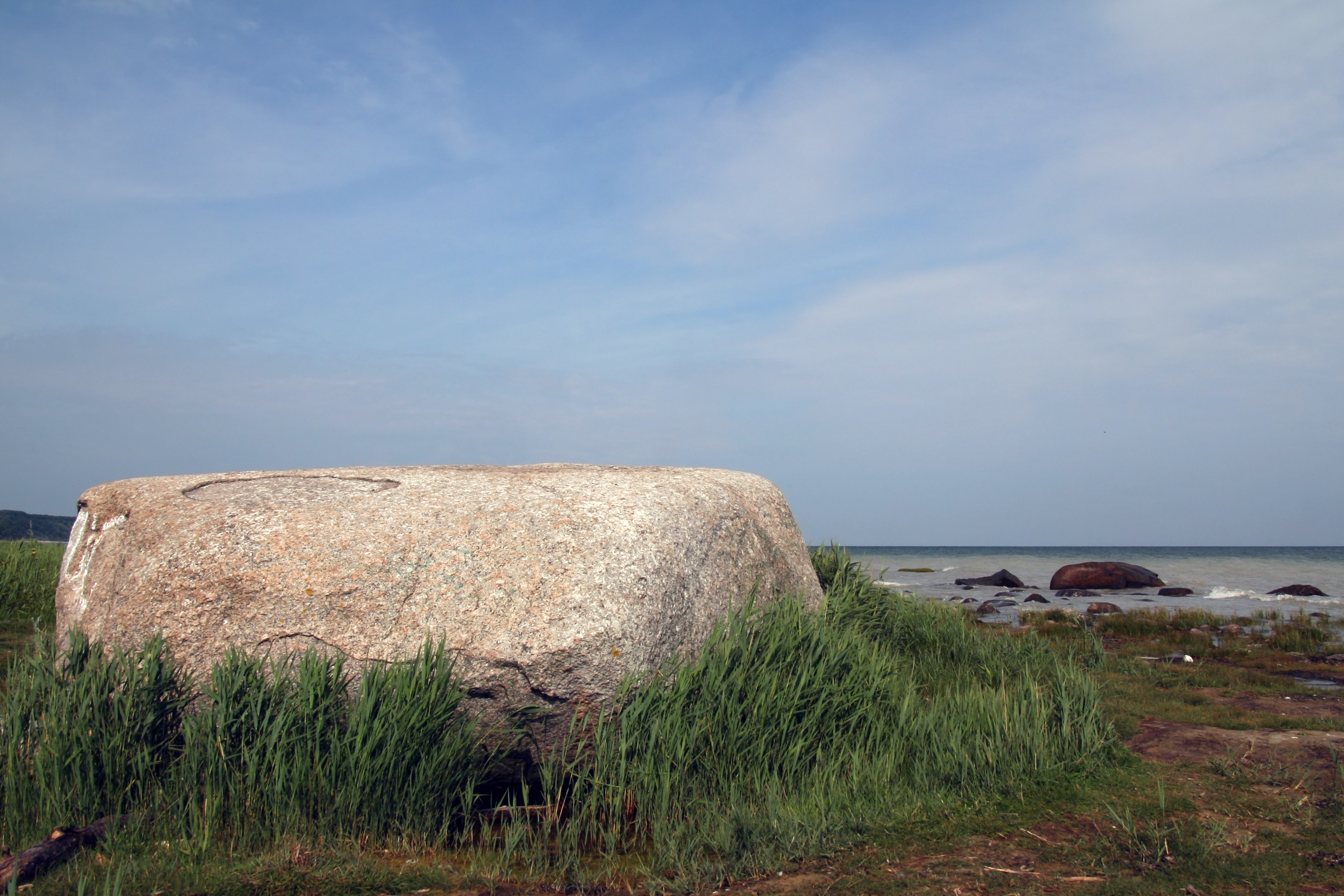
The Siebenschneiderstein

The Siebenschneiderstein (Söbenschniedersteen) is a glacial erratic on the island of Rügen. It lies about 22 metres away from the cliffs of Gellort on the Baltic Sea beach, one kilometre northwest of Cape Arkona. It has a mass of 165 tonnes and a volume of 61 m^{3}. It belongs, like about 20 other erratics, to the legally protected geotopes on the Island of Rügen.

The rock is not the biggest erratic on Rügen (that is the Buskam at 600 m^{3}), but it is the fourth largest and marks the northern point of the island and hence the northernmost point of Eastern Germany.

== See also ==
- Glacial erratics on and around Rügen
