= Schwanenstein =

Coordinates: 54°35′7″N 13°36′43″E

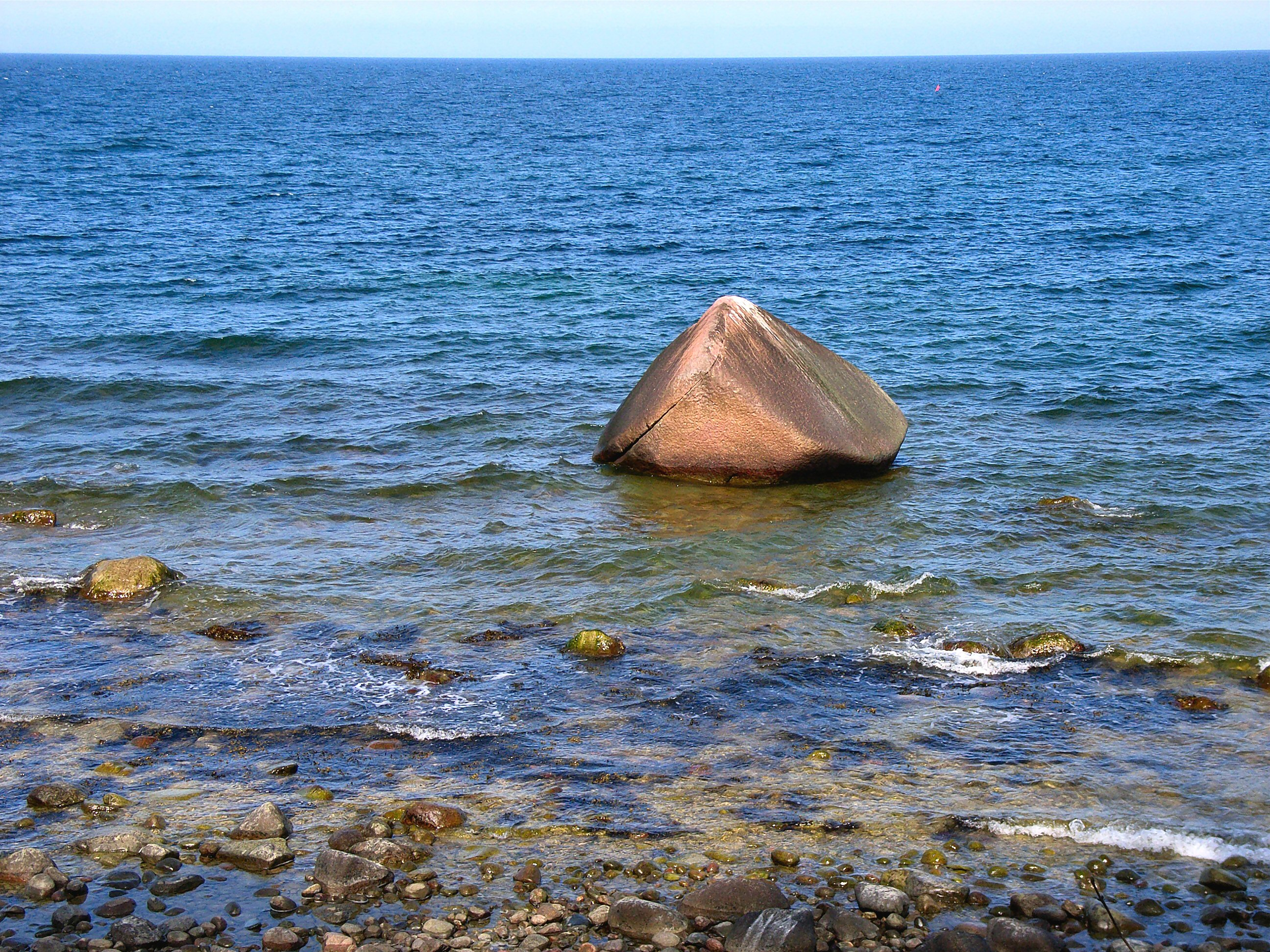
The Schwanenstein near Lohme

Lohme's coat of arms, commemorating the legend of babies being delivered by a stork on top of Schwanenstein

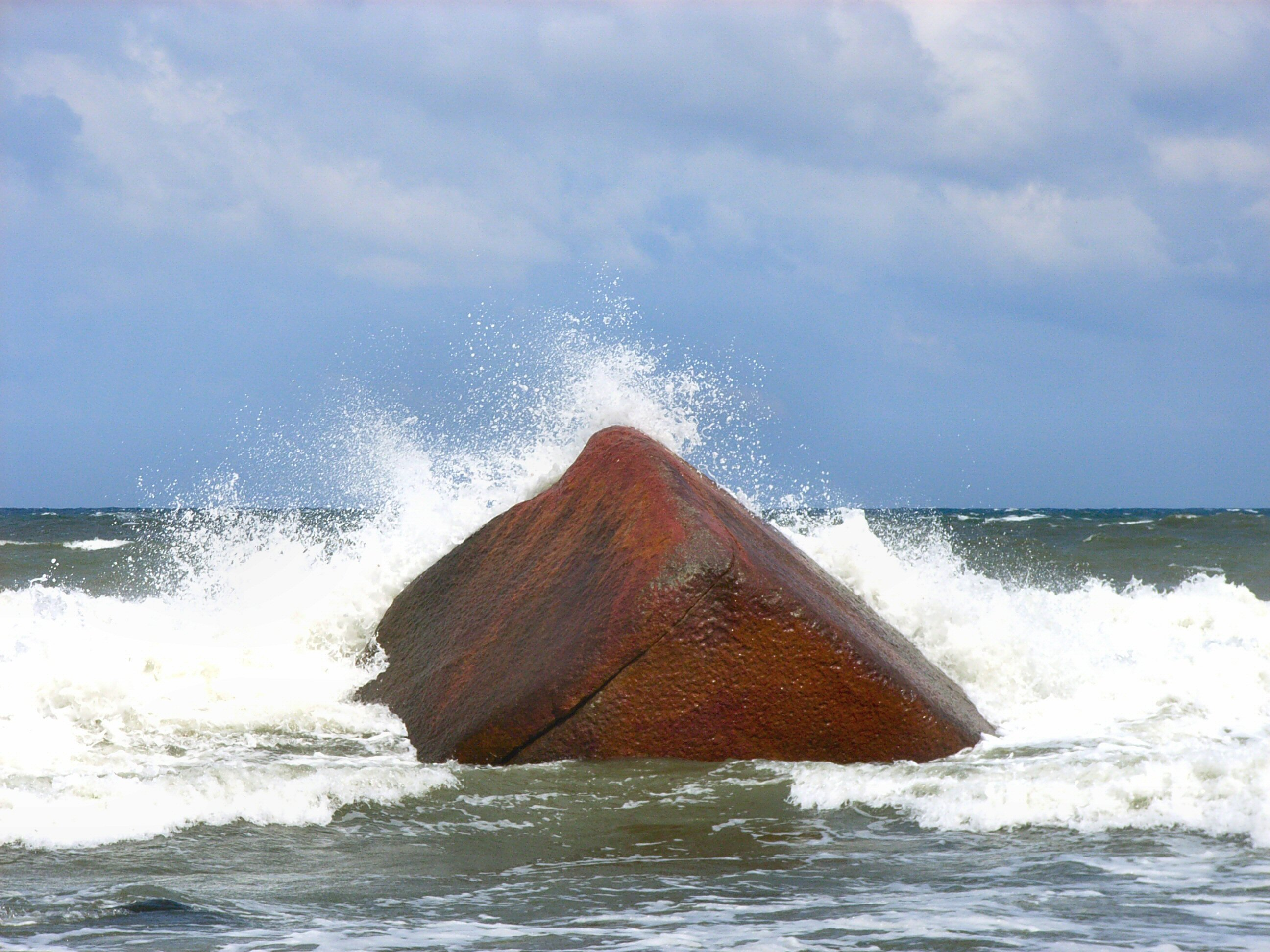
The Schwanenstein in the breakers

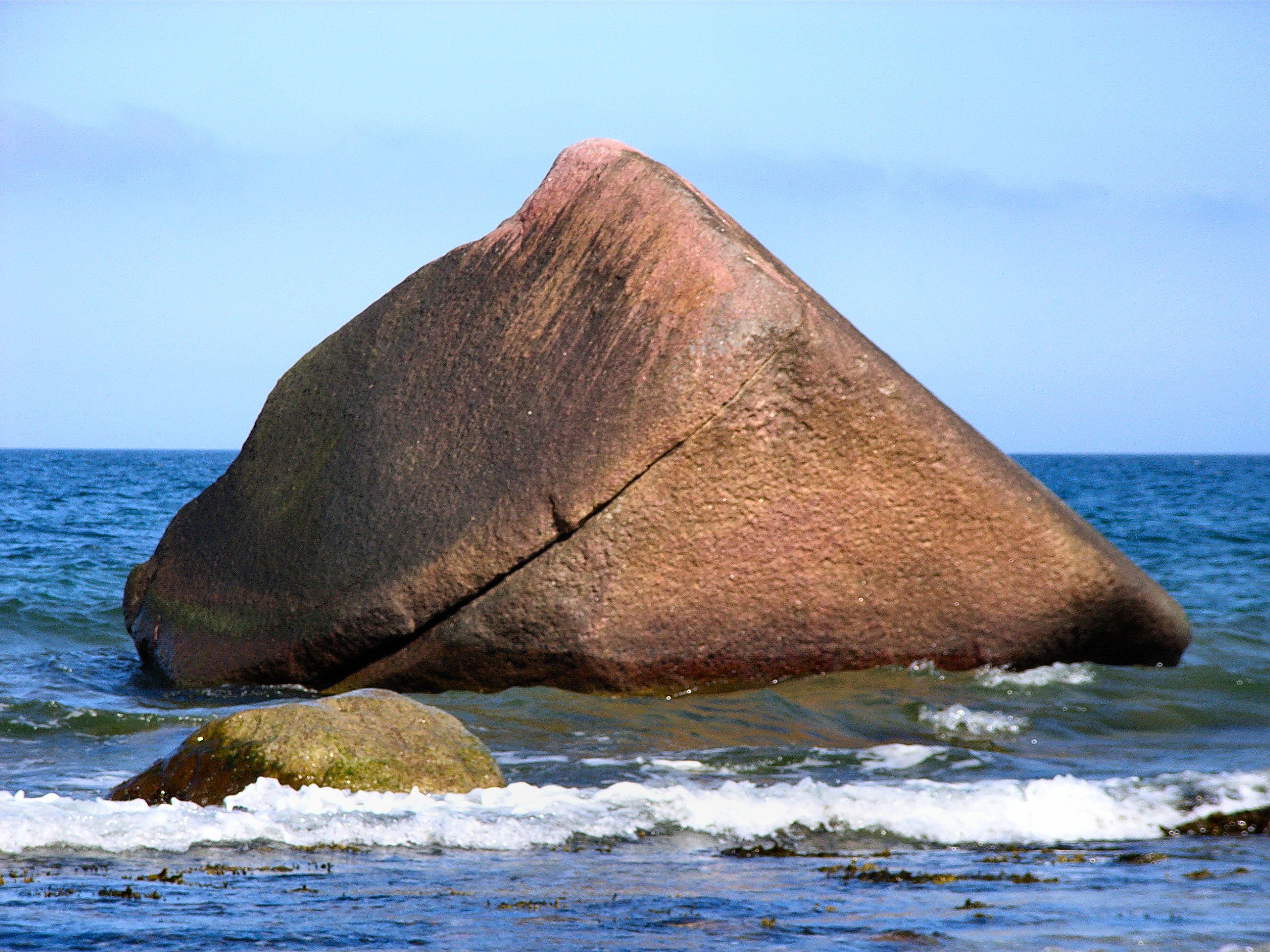
The Schwanenstein close up

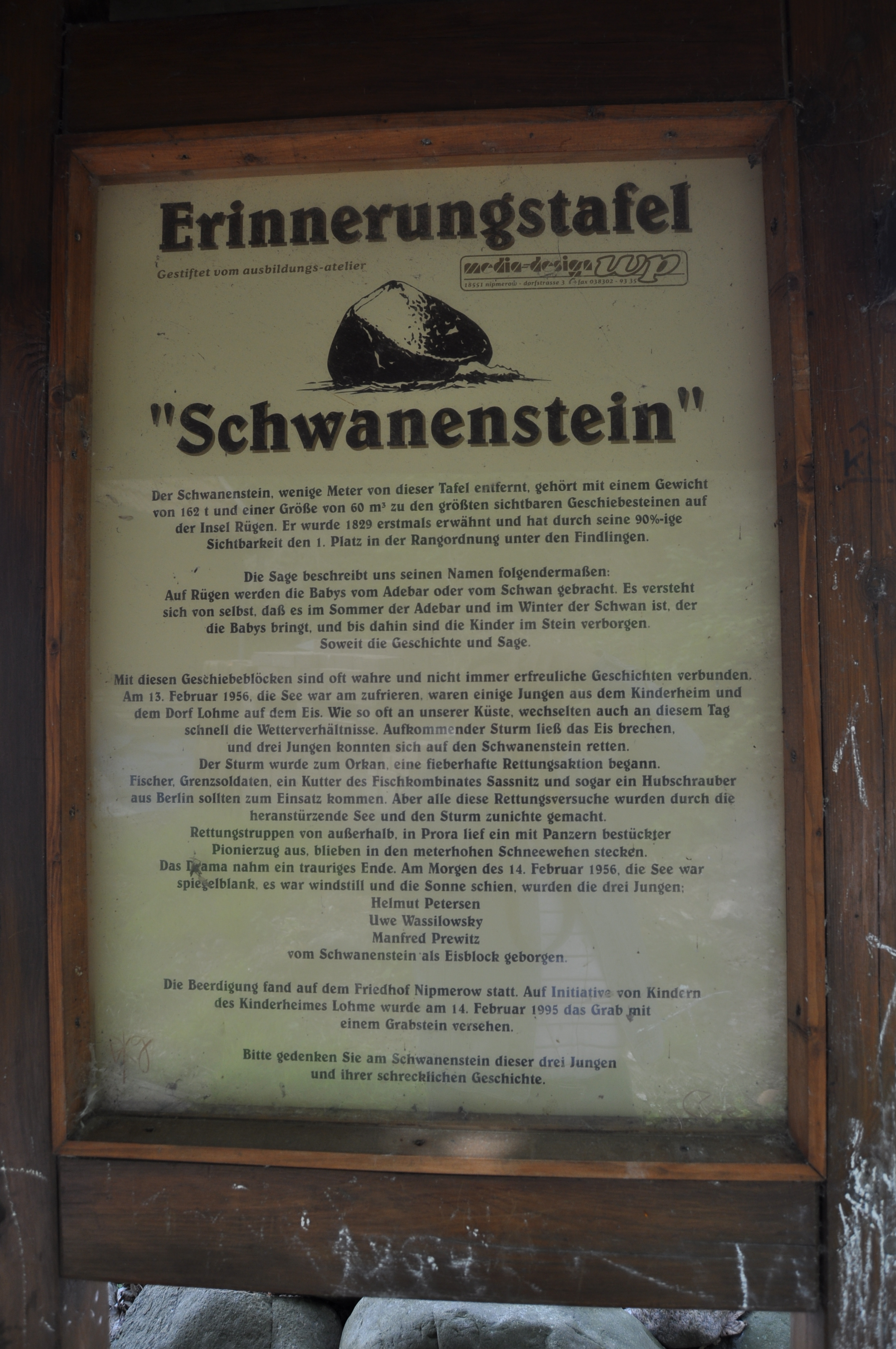
Memorial plaque dedicated to the incident on February 13, 1956 which occurred at Schwanenstein

The Schwanenstein is a glacial erratic on the island of Rügen in Germany. It lies about 100 metres east of the harbour at Lohme on the northern shore of the Jasmund peninsula about 20 metres off the beach in the Baltic Sea. It weighs 162 tonnes and has a volume of 60 m^{3}. It is thus the fifth largest erratic of about 20 other large glacial boulders that are part of Rügen's legally protected geotopes. It is stylistically portrayed in Lohme's coat of arms.

== Origin and features ==
The Schwanenstein is made of so-called hammer granite and was very probably transported here from the island of Bornholm during the last ice age. Its reddish appearance is due to the presence of a high proportion of potassium feldspar. On its west side a marked crevice runs through the stone that, over the course of time, has been enlarged by the crystallisation pressure of frozen ice and may well result in the shearing off of a large slab of rock in the near future.

== Legends and stories ==
Like many other erratics, the Schwanenstein is linked to several legends and stories.

- According to one legend, babies were delivered on Rügen in summer by Adebar the stork and in winter by swans. Until then the children were hidden in the rock.
- An incident occurred on 13 February 1956, when some boys from the orphanage and the village of Lohme were playing near the shore on the frozen Baltic Sea. The weather changed suddenly, a storm whipped up and broke the ice. Three boys saved themselves on the Schwanenstein. As the wind dramatically increased in strength a frantic rescue operation was launched. Local fishermen, a fishing boat from Sassnitz and border guards tried to save the children, but storm surge wrecked all their efforts. Rescue teams from outside, for example, an engineer platoon of the Volkspolizei from Prora, got stuck in the metre-high snowdrifts. Only the next morning, when the weather had calmed, could the bodies of the three boys, Helmut Petersen, Uwe Wassilowsky and Manfred Prewitz, be recovered from the Schwanenstein. They were buried in the cemetery of Nipmerow, in the parish of Lohme. 39 years later, on 14 February 1995, at the initiative of the children at Lohme orphanage, a memorial stone was erected at their grave.

== See also ==
- Glacial till
- Glacial series
- Erratics on and around Rügen
