= Prussia Columns =

Monumental column

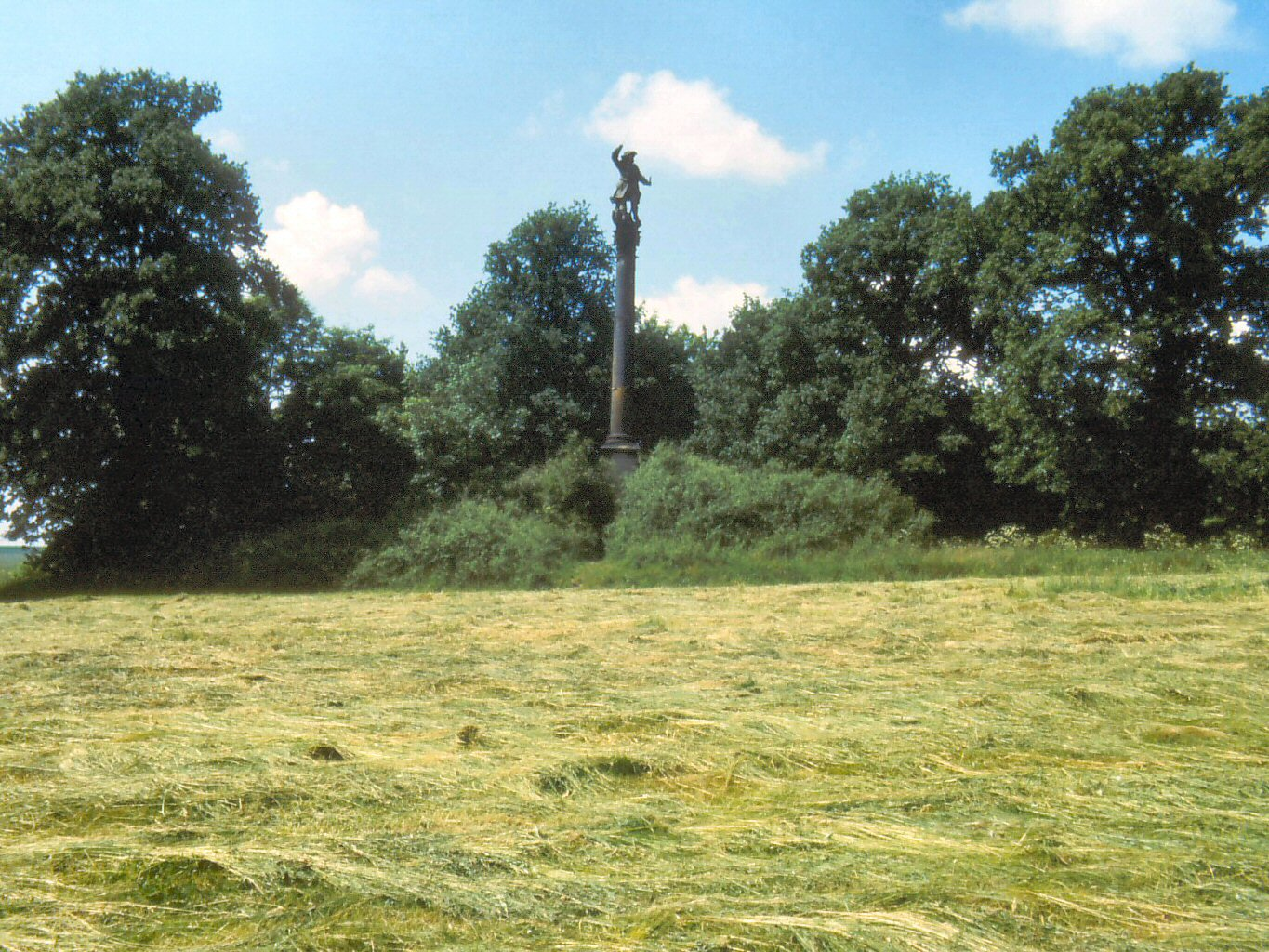
Prussia column near Groß Stresow in July 1984

The Prussia Columns (German: Preußensäulen) are two monuments, over 15 metres (49 ft) high, that were erected in the years 1854 and 1855 by order of the Prussian king, Frederick William IV on the southeast coast of the German island of Rügen near Neukamp and Groß Stresow. Both villages are today part of the municipality of Putbus.

The monument near Neukamp was inaugurated on 15 October 1854 and the one near Groß Stresow exactly one year later, on the 60th birthday of Frederick William IV. The drums and parts of the pedestal were carved from one of the largest glacial erratics on and around Rügen, the Great Rock near Nardevitz on Rügen's Jasmund peninsula. Most of the rock was destroyed as a result of being quarried for the columns. Nevertheless, it is still impressive today, and sticks 3 metres out of the ground.

The monuments were intended to commemorate the landings of the Brandenburg and later, Prussian troops on the island in the years 1678 and 1715 and to demonstrate Prussia's claim to power over the southern Baltic Sea region. The island of Rügen, which had belonged to Swedish Pomerania since the Treaty of Westphalia in 1648, was on each occasion briefly wrested from Swedish rule as a result of the invasions, but then returned to Sweden as a result of subsequent peace agreements.

== Historical background ==
=== Neukamp ===
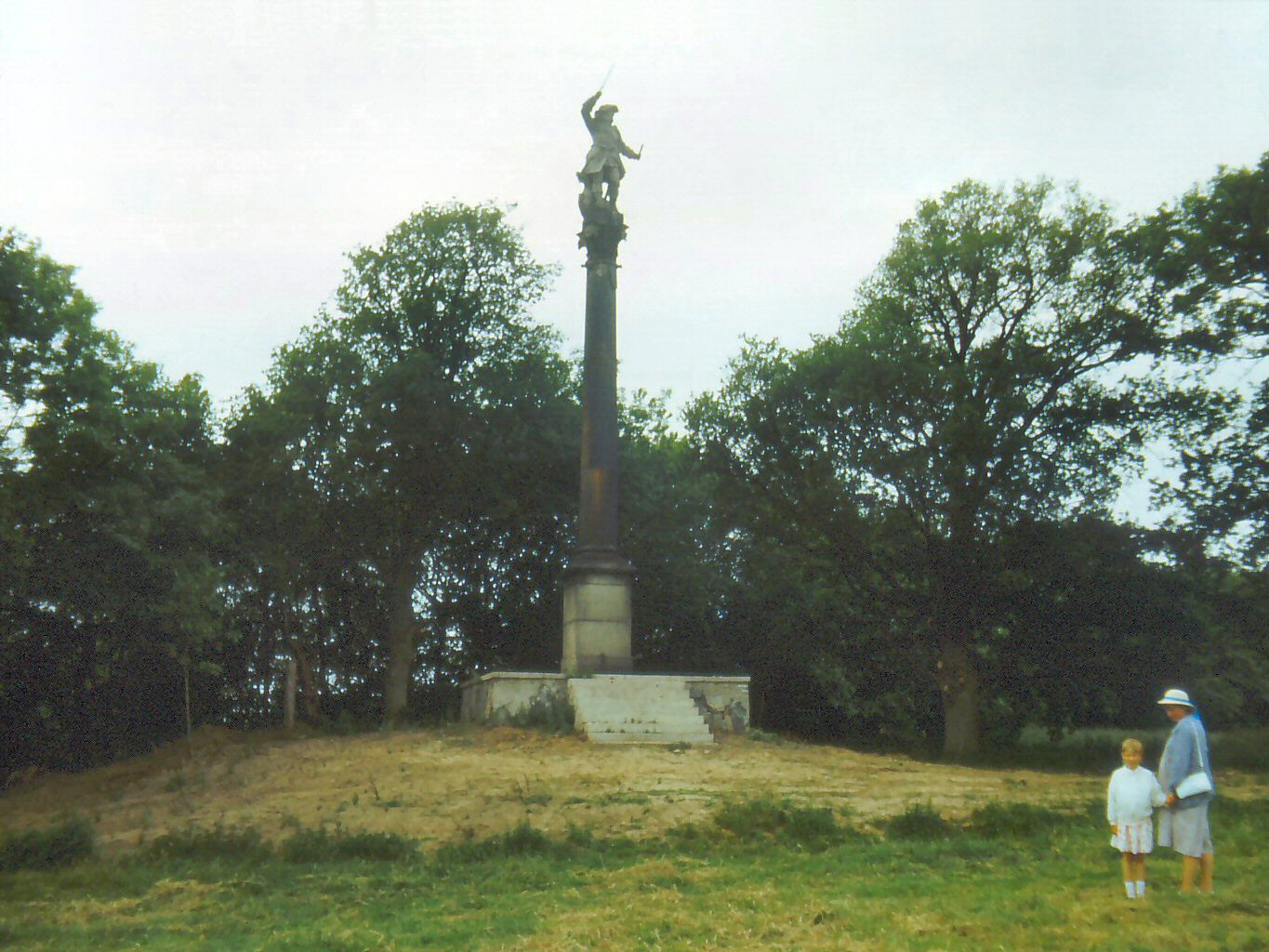
Prussia Column near Groß Stresow in July 1989

During the Swedish-Brandenburg War (1674–1679) Frederick William, the "Great Elector" of Brandenburg, allied with the Danish king, Christian V, conquered the island in September 1678 in the invasion of Rügen. The Danes landed under the command of Admiral Nils Juel on 13 September 1678 on the Wittow peninsula and, after driving off the weak Swedish garrison on Wittow to the Schaabe near present-day Juliusruh, erected earthworks that are still well preserved today (by the village sign and coming from the south).

The Great Elector landed on the same day on the southeast shore of Rügen near Neukamp with the Brandenburg troops (7,000–8,000 men) under the command of General Field Marshal Derfflinger. He had approached from Greifswald through the Greifswalder Bodden with his fleet comprising 350 sailing ships and 150 rowing boats. The Swedes entrenched there were quickly forced back via Altefähr to Stralsund and Stralsund itself was also captured on 12 October 1678. The entrenchment near Neukamp is well preserved and is located just behind the monument.

Following the Treaty of Saint-Germain on 29 June 1679 Brandenburg-Western Pomerania, including Rügen, was returned to Sweden.

=== Groß Stresow ===
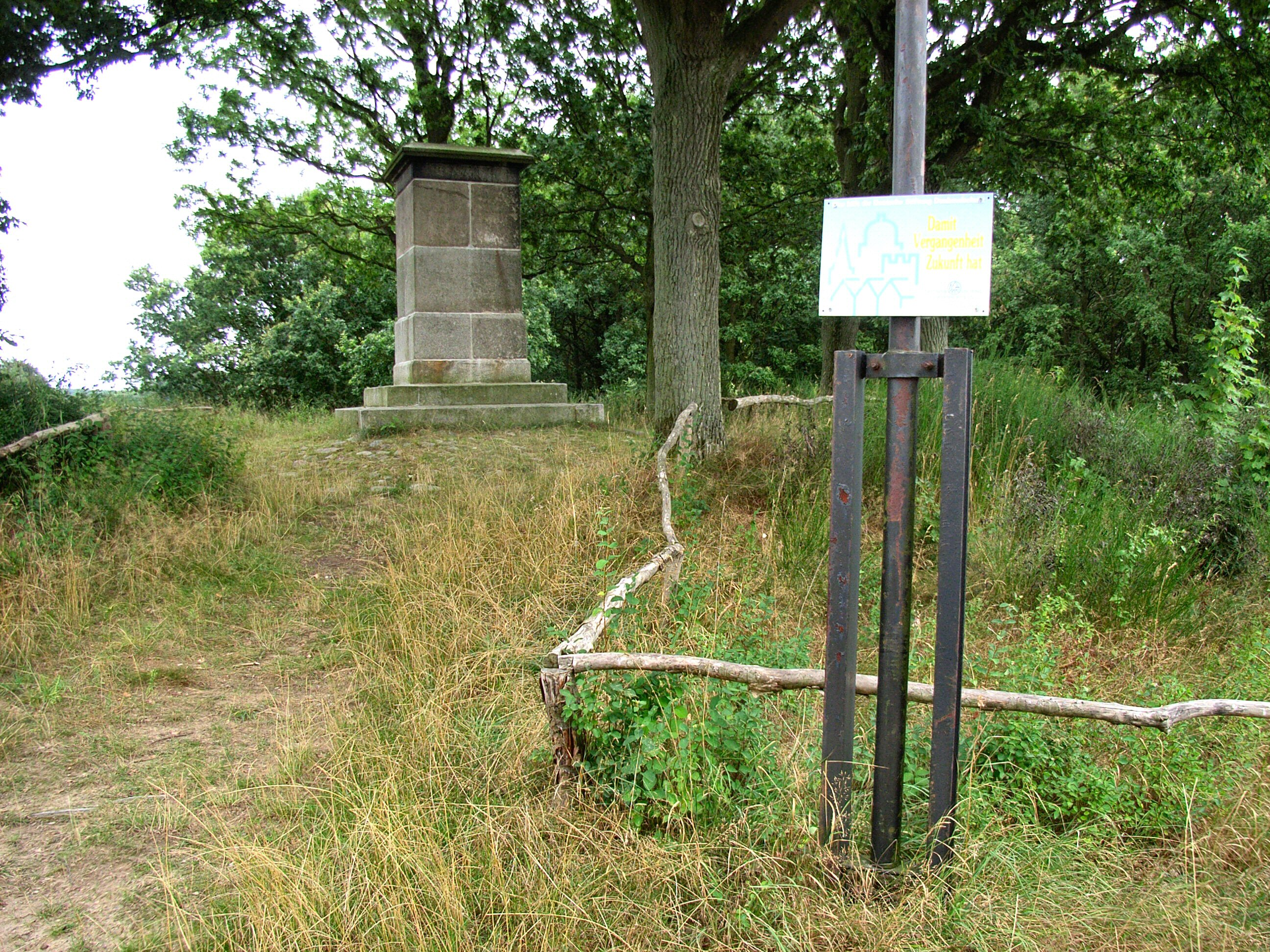
Pedestal of the Prussia Column of 1855 near Groß Stresow - re-erected in October 2004

In the course of the Great Northern War (1700–1721), the Prussian king, Frederick William I, allied with the Danish king, Frederick IV, landed on 15 November 1715 with his forces (20,000–24,000 men) commanded by the Old Dessauer near Groß Stresow. They drove the Swedes, led by their king, Charles XII, from the island of Rügen over the Strelasund to Stralsund, which had been besieged for a long time by the Danes and Prussians, but had hitherto received Swedish supplies through Rügen. After further siege operations the Swedes trapped in the town of Stralsund gave themselves up on 23 December 1715, Charles XII only escaping in a fishing boat across the Baltic Sea. Despite their victory, Prussia had to cede the island to Sweden as part of the peace treaty of 14 August 1719.

== Erection of the monuments ==
The designs for the monuments ordained by Frederick William IV were produced by the architect, Friedrich August Stüler. The sculptor, Wilhelm Stürmer, carved the statues on top of the columns. The statues are each about 3.4 metres (11 ft) high and, like the capitals, are made of Saxon sandstone, standing atop the granite columns. The total cost was 6,815 Reichstalers.

== Recent history to the present ==
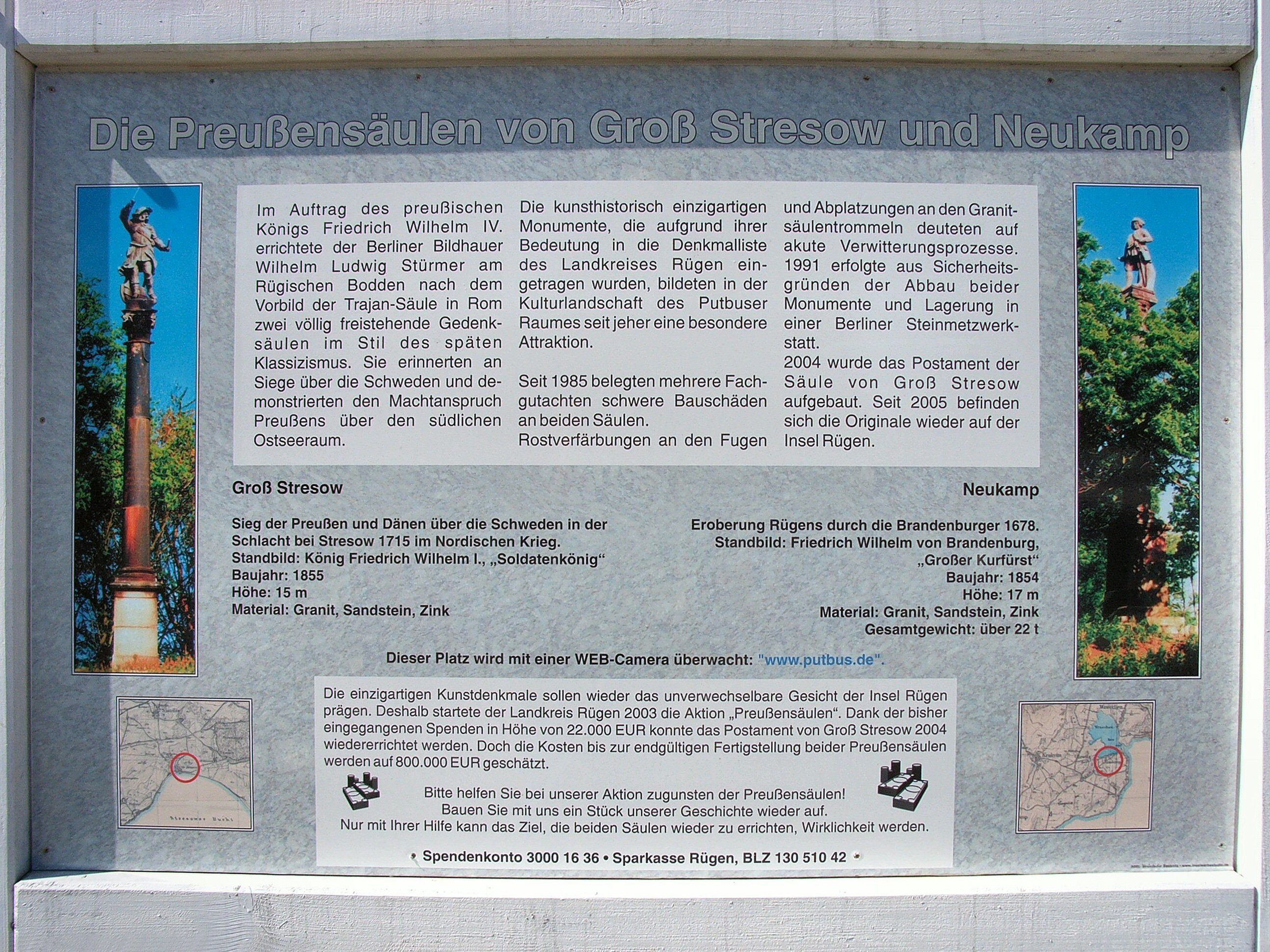
Information board on the site of the original pieces of the Prussia Columns in Alleestraße in Putbus

In 1985, i.e. 130 years after the erection of the monuments, experts from the Dresden Office for Monument Conservation (VEB Denkmalpflege Dresden) questioned the structural stability of the columns during an inspection. Five years later, following an emergency meeting on 11 September 1990 in Putbus, a Berlin master stonemason and restorer was contracted to remove both monuments. In late November 1991, the monuments were dismantled and their drums, capitals and statues transported to the master stonemason's workshop in Berlin-Pankow. Originally replicas of the drums, capitals and statues were to be made, because the advice had been not to repair them due to the severe damage to the original stone. The drums had once been joined together by means of iron pins. Serious corrosion of these jointing pins over many decades had caused the granite to split in places, which meant there had been a danger of the columns collapsing as result of the formation of cracks and fissures. The statues, too, were so badly eroded by weathering and lightning strikes, that their outline had been destroyed for ever. The material to be used for any replicas - i.e. Elbe Sandstone for the capitals and statues and Bornholm granite, of which the Nardevitz Erratic was also made, for the column drums weighing six and five tons respectively - would be readily obtainable.

Further damage occurred during disassembly. The commissioned stonemason used percussion drills to get the iron pins out that held the pieces of the granite together. In doing so, large pieces at the respective ends of the drums were broken off. The drilling holes at each end of the drums show this clearly. The journey to Berlin was did not go smoothly either. The statue of Frederick William I from Great Stresow broke off at the legs. The head came off and was glued back by the master stonemason.

Due to the continuing shortage of money in the district of Rügen, which was the owner of the monuments, little work was carried out in the following years, with the exception of the completion of a capital. One of the factors in this situation was, for example, the fact that in allocating funds, the making of replicas had a lower priority over the restoration of original monuments.

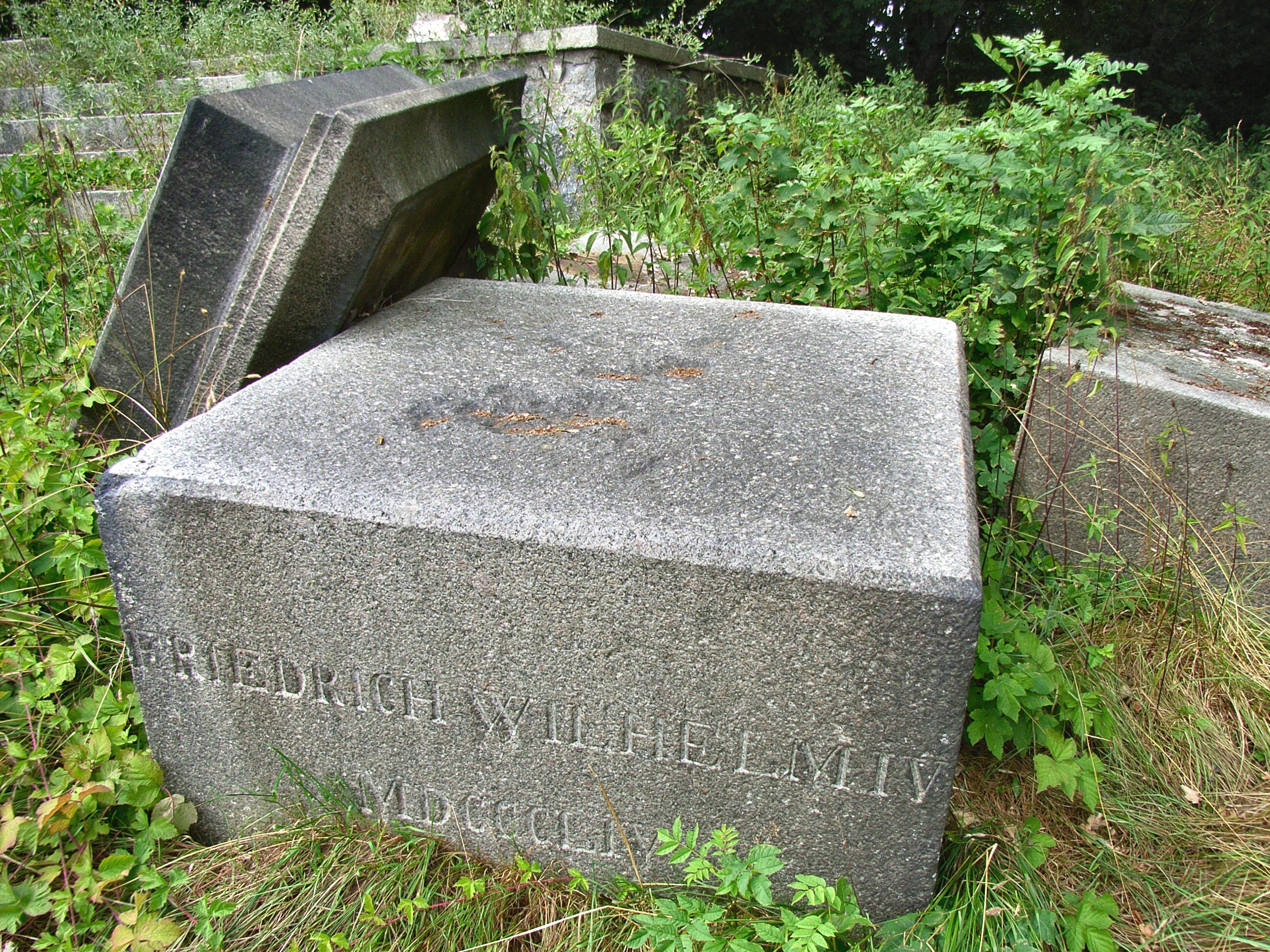
Pieces of the pedestal near Neukamp in August 2006

A staged plan agreed in March 2003 by the Prussia Columns Working Group envisaged the following steps: First the pedestals of the two monuments should be returned to their rightful place, then the column drums and finally the statues by 2010. Because parts of the pedestals were and are still dotted randomly around the site of the monument in Neukamp (as at January 2007). The idea behind this phased plan was and is that a beginning must be made more visible to attract sponsors and increase donations. In seeking sponsors for this project, the president of the County Council even wrote, for example, to the royal houses of Denmark and Sweden.

In April 2004 it was decided to return the original pieces of the first Prussia Column to the island by the time of the 150th anniversary of its inauguration, i.e. by 15 October 2004. Even this return journey failed thanks again to financial problems, because for the two monuments only a token amount of 500 euros was set aside in the county budget.

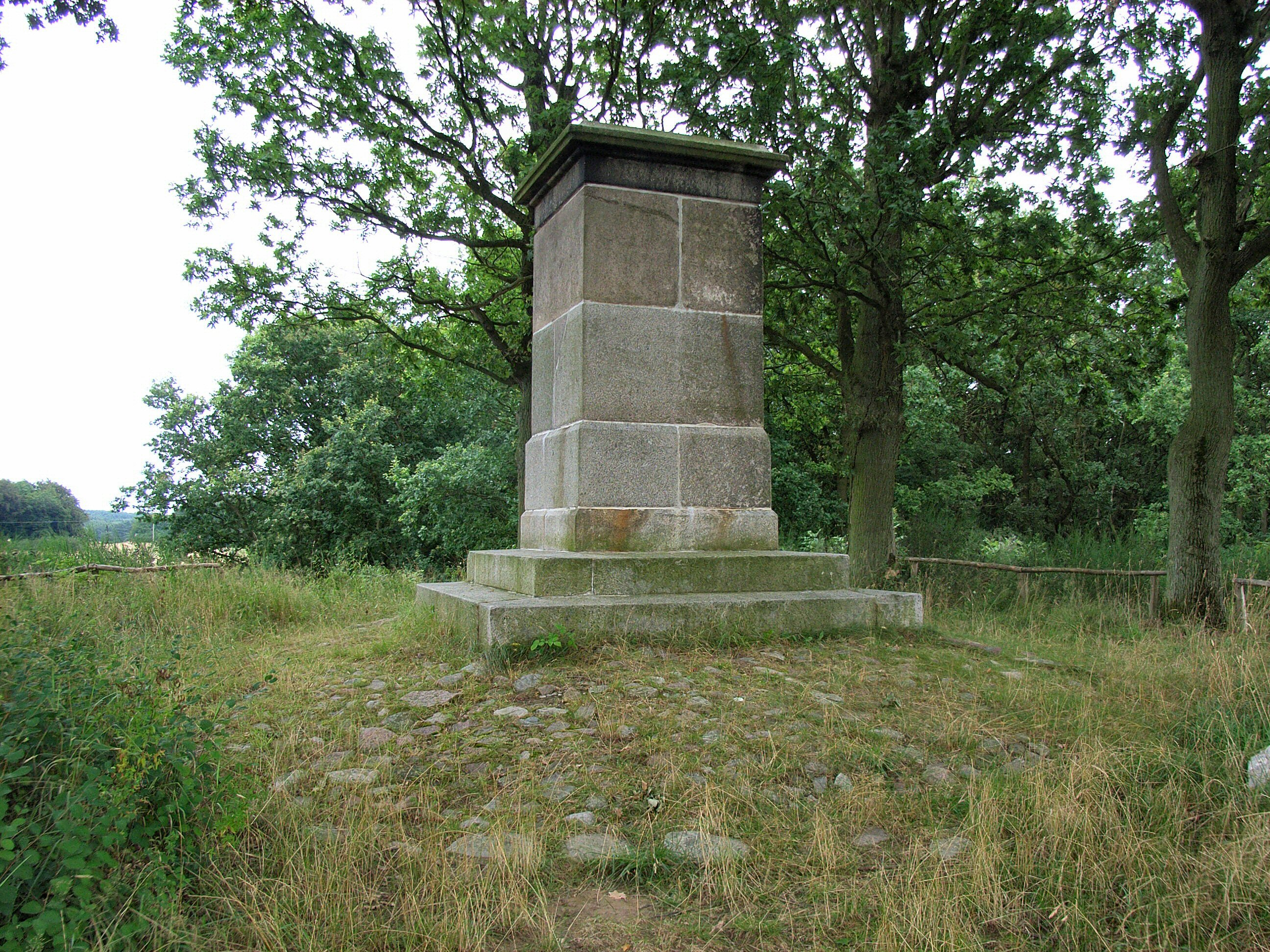
Pedestal of the Prussia Column near Groß Stresow

In October 2004, the 3.30-metre-high pedestal of the Prussia Column at Groß Stresow was restored. As was suspected from the results of earlier soil investigations, the stability of this monument had been reinforced by the use of stones laid to a depth of 5.80 metres and which had been taken from a megalithic tomb that had formerly lain on the site. This was re-confirmed during work on the foundation. The necessary €20,000 were found from donations by the bank of Kreissparkasse Rügen and the German Foundation for Monument Conservation.

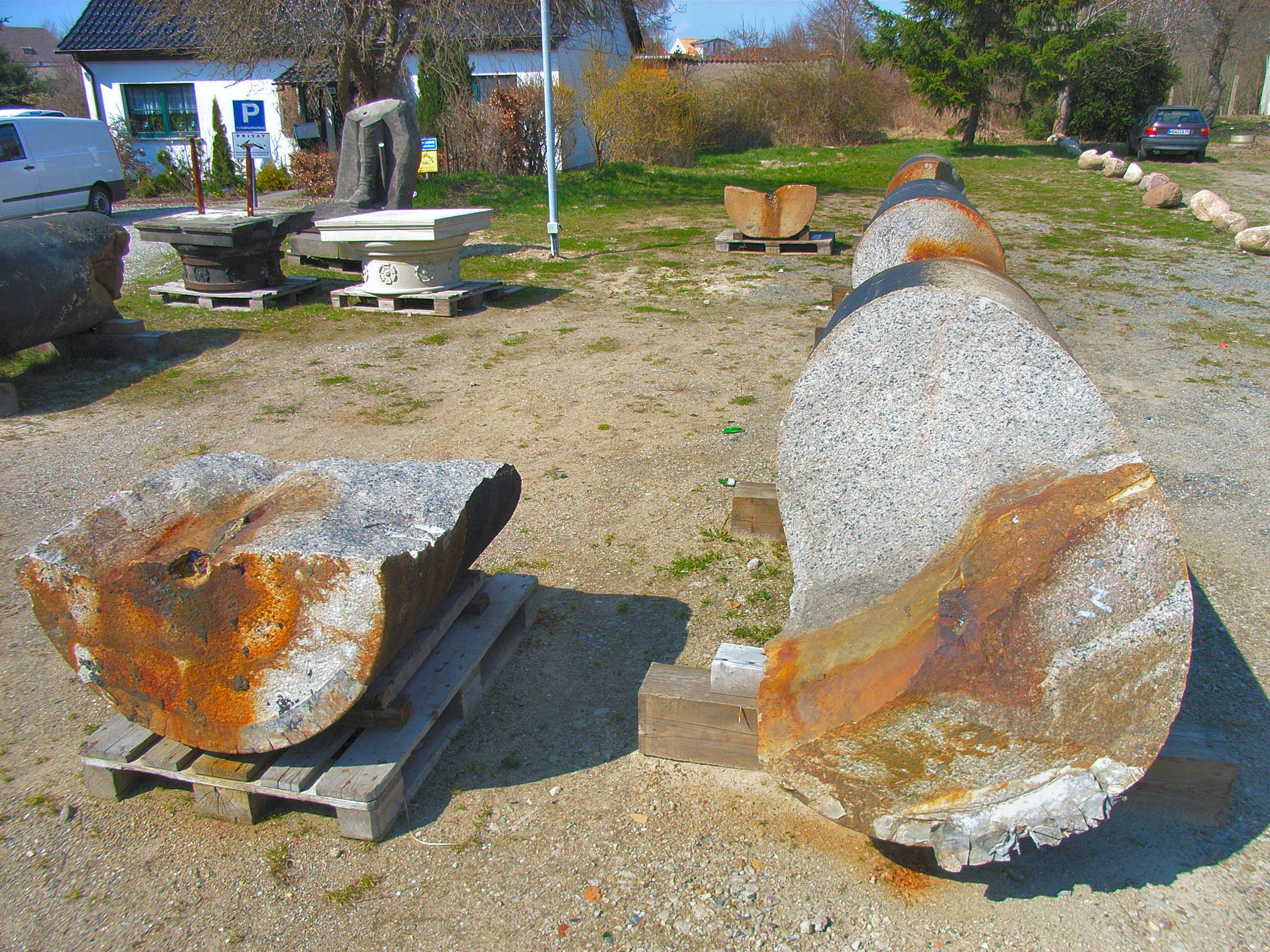
Broken column drum on the storage site in Putbus in April 2006

On 2 September 2005, the original pieces were transported, unworked, from Berlin to Putbus and, since then have been displayed to the public in an open area on Alleestraße road, near the roundabout. Here, too, an accident happened for the master stonemason. The already broken statue of Frederick William I fell over in the workshop. The plaits, the nose, part of the brim of the hat and the arm broke off. After almost 15 years, all the pieces were now back at Rügen, in order to enable an independent assessment by experts. An information board here gives the story of the two monuments and appeals for donations for their reconstruction.

On 28 April 2006, a symposium on the recovery and restoration of both monuments was held in Putbus. The organizer of the symposium was the Mecklenburg-Western Pomerania State Office for Culture and Heritage. They came up with the following option for rebuilding the monuments using the original parts: the original parts would first be pierced in the middle of their longitudinal axis. They would then be placed, piece by piece, on the column once the damage had been repaired, the loading on the individual sections being born by a solid stainless steel tube bored through them. Thuse, each part of the column would only be carrying its own weight, the internal, invisible stainless steel pipe, with a new foundation, would bear the overall load. Although this solution is controversial, it would cost (only) €80,000 per column. But faced with a budget deficit of approximately €9.5 million in the district of Rügen by the end of 2007, the money was still not available in 2008.

In summer 2008, at least the pedestal in Neukamp was finally completed - without taking account of the solution proposed by the symposium.
