= Möwenstein (Ummanz) =

Glacial erratic

Coordinates: 54°29′2″N 13°12′34″E

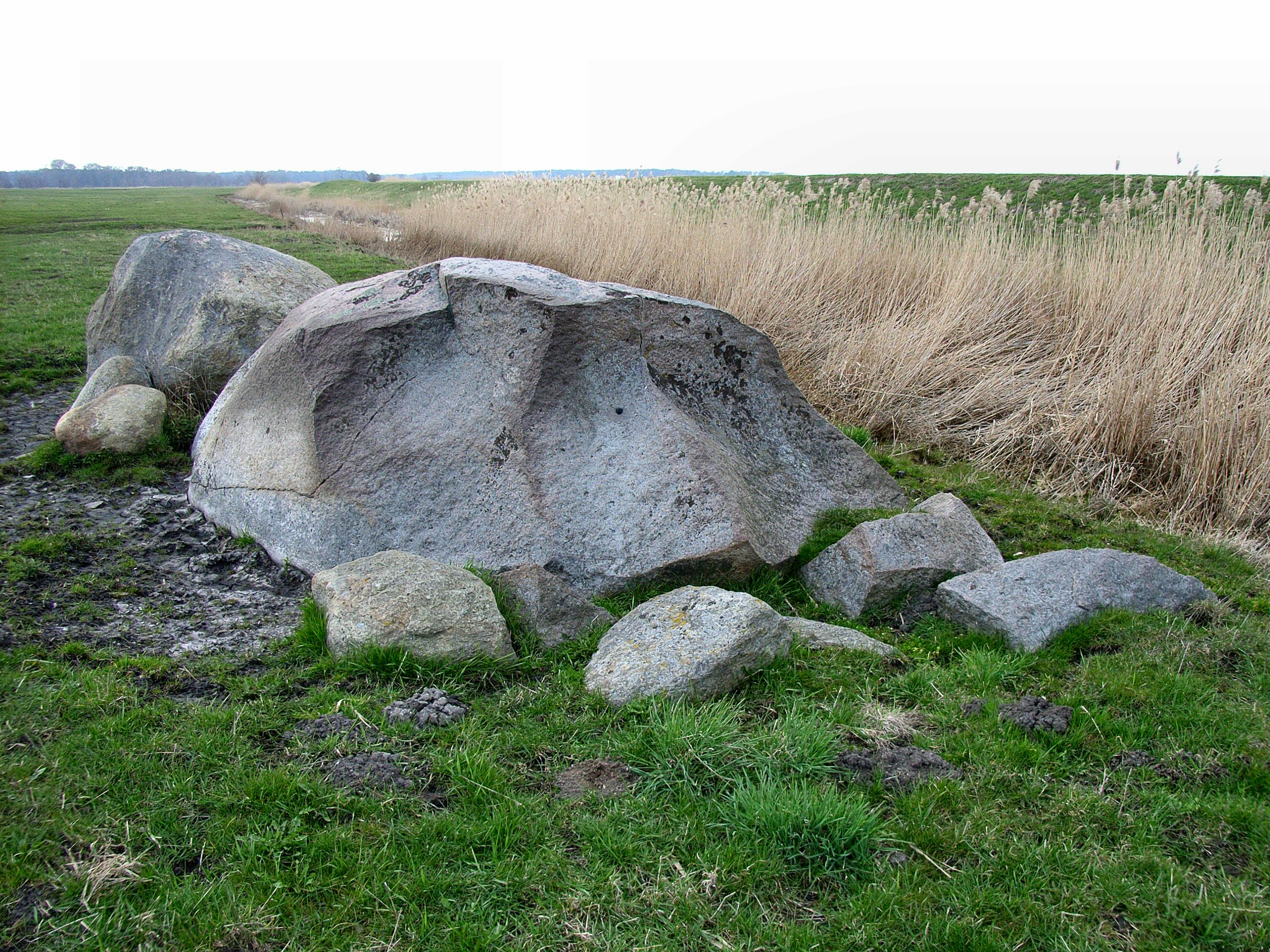
The Möwenstein rock near Tankow on Ummanz

The Möwenstein is a glacial erratic that was transported south from the area of the present-day island of Bornholm by the ice sheet during the last glaciation. It is located on the island of Ummanz in the west of Rügen within the Western Pomerania Lagoon Area National Park. Erratics are relatively uncommon here, most of them lie east of the island of Rügen.

The rock is damaged by boreholes and it is feared that further damage could be caused by frost shattering.

The block, which is made of syenogranite and hammer granite, is legally protected as a natural monument and is indexed by the State Office for the Environment, Conservation and Geologie (de:Landesamt für Umwelt, Naturschutz und Geologie Mecklenburg-Vorpommern) as number G2 91. It is 15.0 metres in circumference and has a volume of about 13.5 m^{3}.

== Access ==
The Möwenstein lies in the bird reserve immediately next to the dyke near Tankow, and can just be made out from the bird hide. Access to the rock itself is restricted by conservation regulations that depend on the season.

== See also ==
- Erratics on and around Rügen
- Mövenstein, in the Baltic Sea off Travemünde
