= Buskam =

Prehistorical ritual site in Germany

Coordinates: 54°20′46″N 13°45′19″E

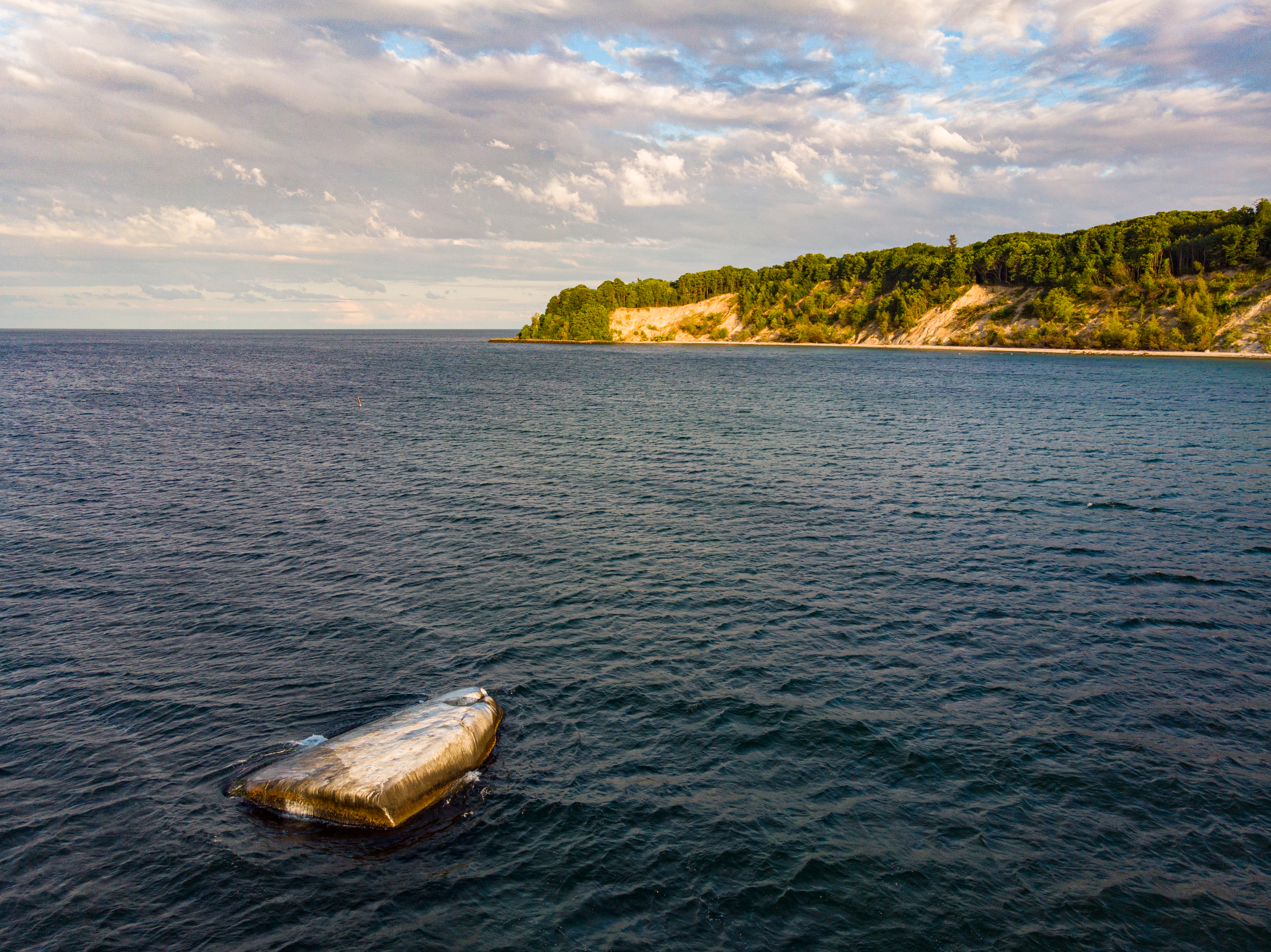
The Buskam in 2020

The Buskam (German pronunciation: [ˈbʊs.kam], locally [ˈbʊːskɒm]), also Buhskam or Buskamen is a large glacial erratic boulder, 325 metres off the coast of Göhren, Rügen, northern Germany. Erratics (German: Findlinge) have been scattered all over northern Germany by the glaciers of the Ice Age, but are usually much smaller. The Buskam has a volume of about 600 m^{3}, a circumference of about 40 metres, and weights about 1,600 tons. A third of it (206 m^{3}) lies above the water surface.

Cavities in the rock indicate that the Buskam was used as a ritual place in prehistory, when such caved rocks were commonly used for ritual sacrifice. An iron crucifix was attached to it after the conversion of Pomerania.

According to local legends and folklore, the Buskam is the site where witches dance during Walpurgis Night, and mermaids are also supposed to dance often on the rock.

== Etymology ==
There are several theories about the meaning of the name Buskam. The name Buskam could be derived from the Proto-Slavic *bogis kamien, which means ‘god's stone’ (*bog ‘god’, kamien ‘stone’). It is also conceivable that the syllable bus- stands for ‘atonement’ in a Christian sense. However, it is possible that the syllable comes from the Middle Low German buhsen, which would mean ‘swell, rush’ and would describe the location of the stone off the coast.

== See also ==
- Glacial erratics on and around Rügen
- Early history of Pomerania
