= Lohme =

- Municipality
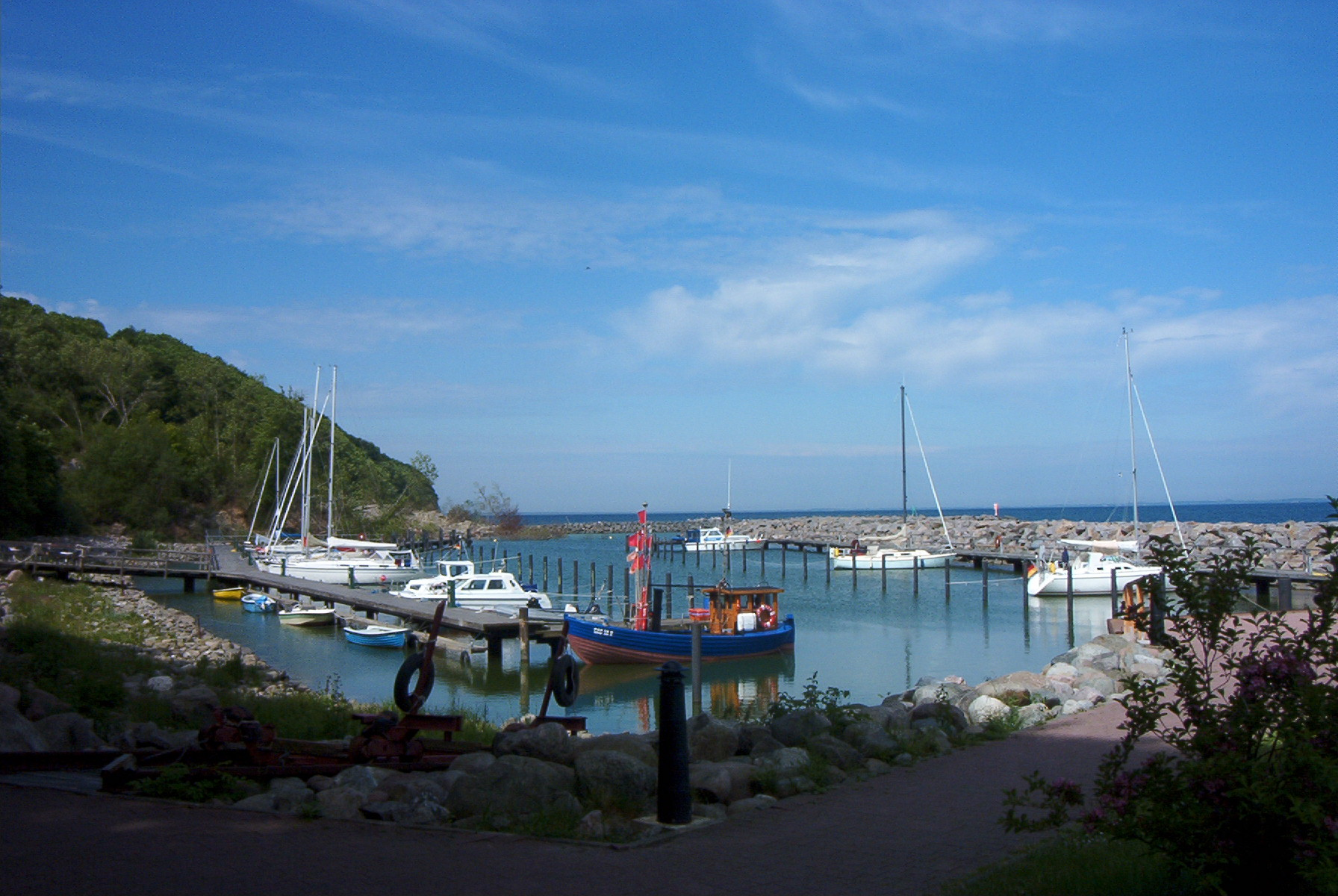
- Harbour of Lohme

- Coat of arms

- Location of Lohme within Vorpommern-Rügen district
- Interactive map of Lohme
- Location within Germany Location within Mecklenburg-Vorpommern
- Coordinates: 54°35′N 13°36′E
- Country: Germany
- State: Mecklenburg-Vorpommern
- District: Vorpommern-Rügen
- Municipal assoc.: Nord-Rügen

Government
  - Mayor: Matthias Ogilvie

Area
  - Total: 13.70 km^{2} (5.29 sq mi)
- Elevation: 15 m (49 ft)

Population (2025-12-31)
  - Total: 466
  - Density: 34.0/km^{2} (88.1/sq mi)
- Time zone: UTC+01:00 (CET)
  - Summer (DST): UTC+02:00 (CEST)
- Postal codes: 18551
- Dialling codes: 038302
- Vehicle registration: RÜG
- Website: www.lohme.de

Lohme is a municipality in the Vorpommern-Rügen district, in Mecklenburg-Vorpommern, Germany.

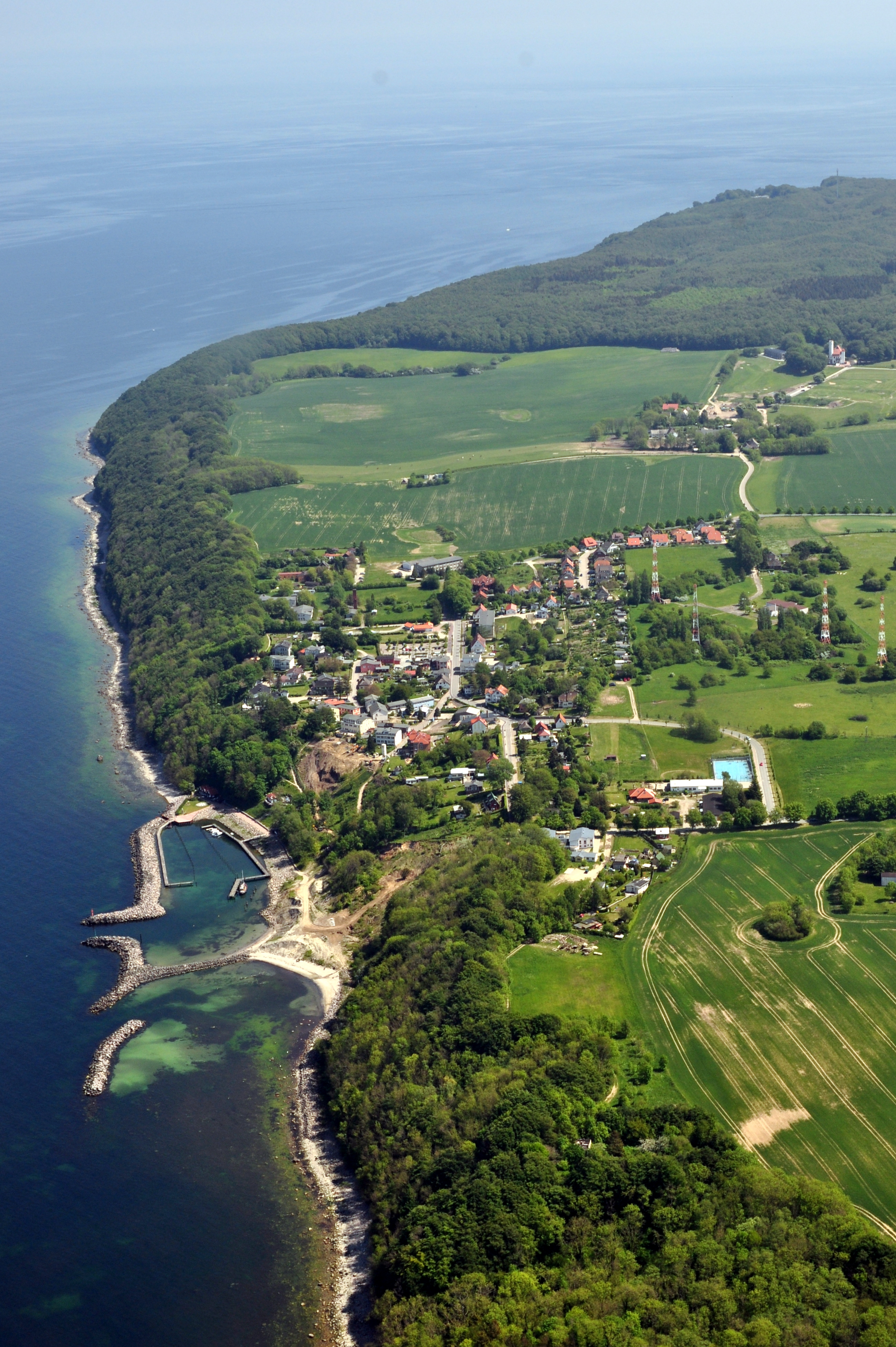
Lohme from the air
