= Hamburg =

City and state in Germany

Free and Hanseatic City of Hamburg Freie und Hansestadt Hamburg (German) Friee un Hansestadt Hamborg (Low German)
- Municipality and state
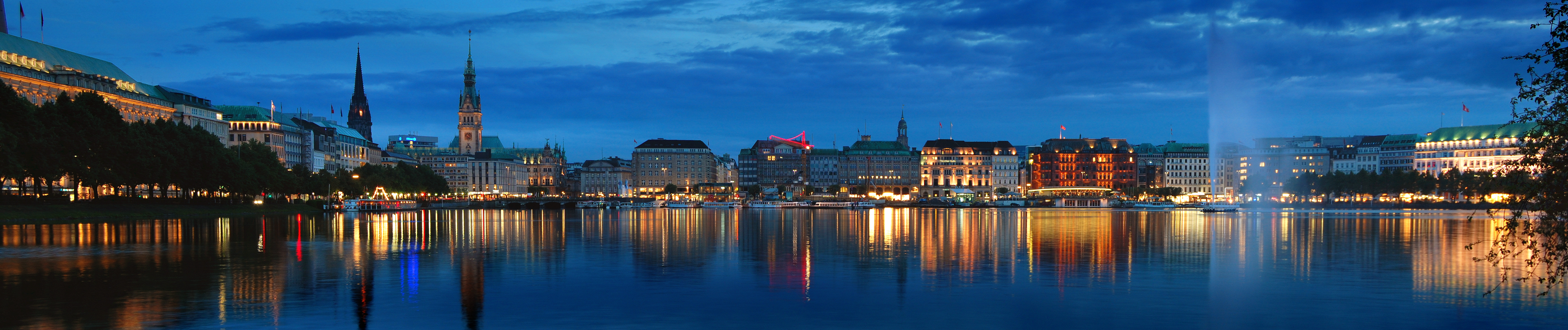
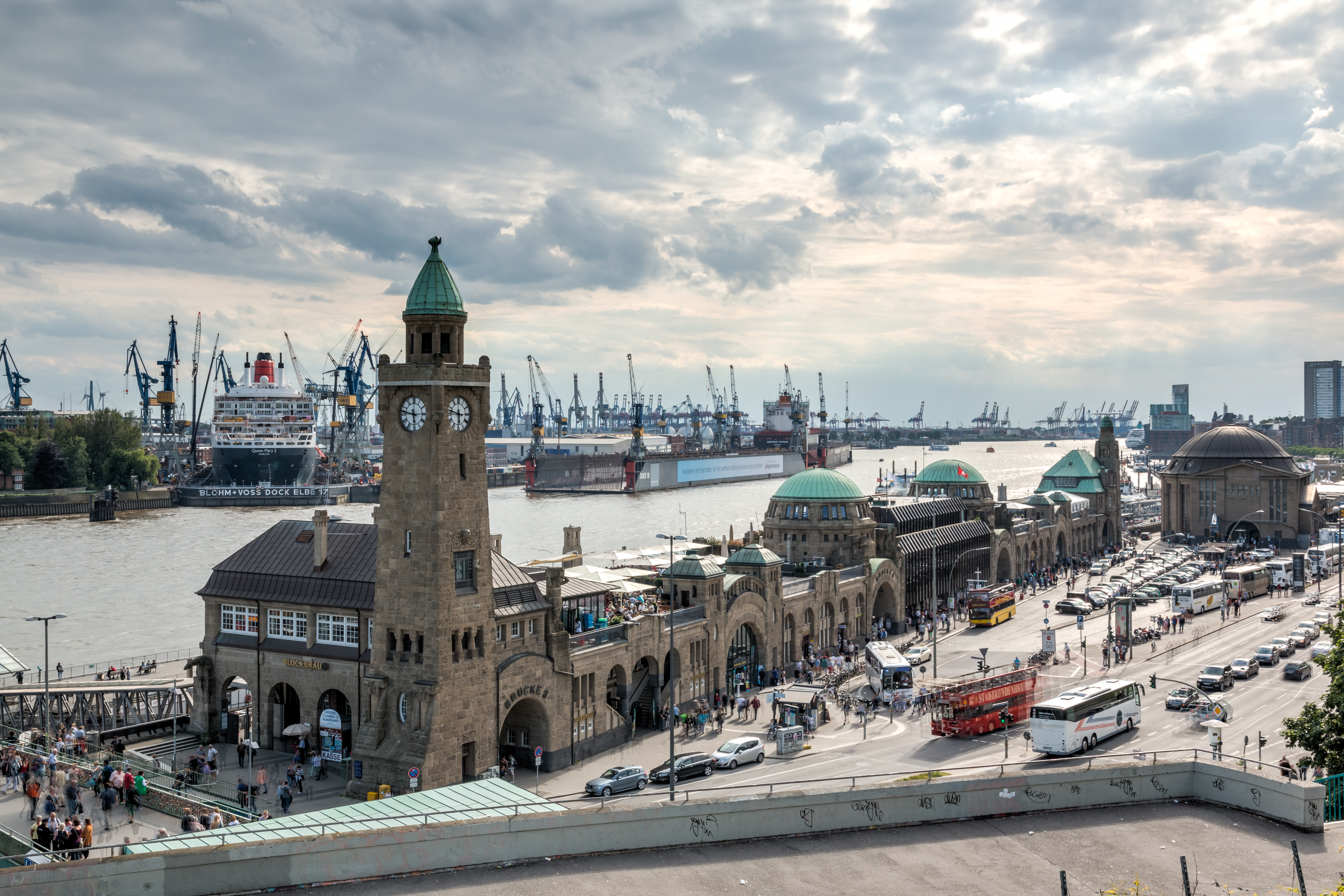
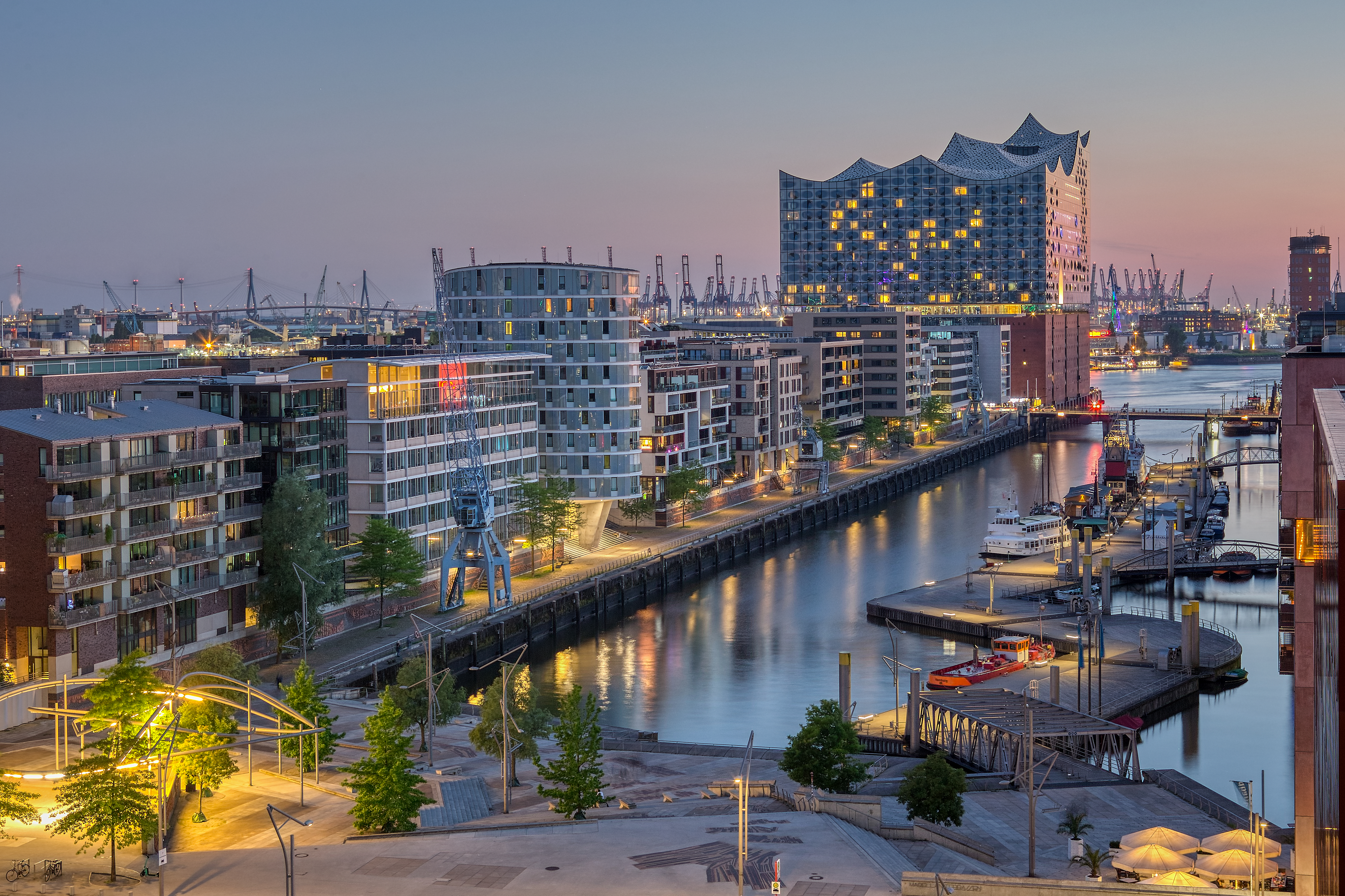
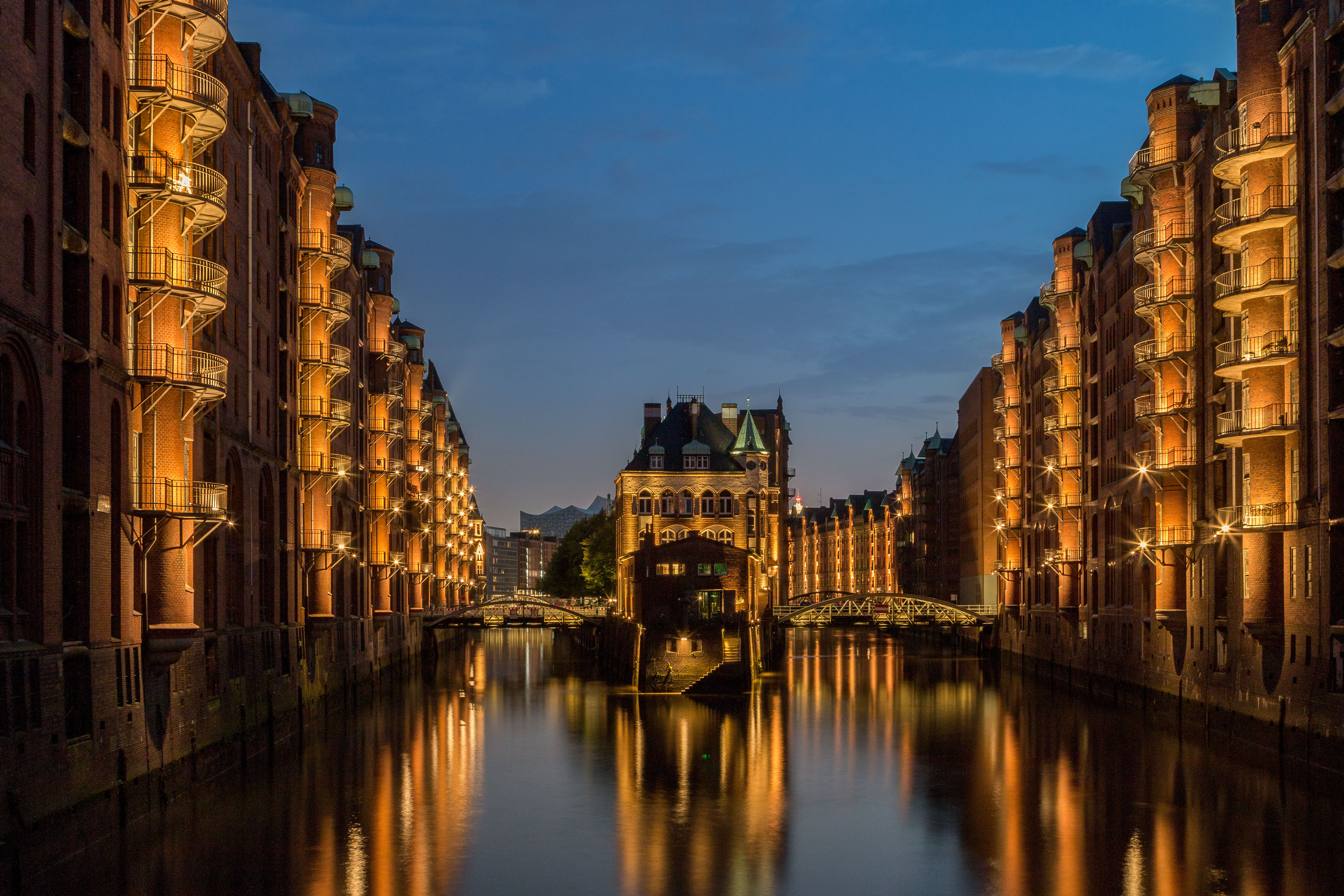
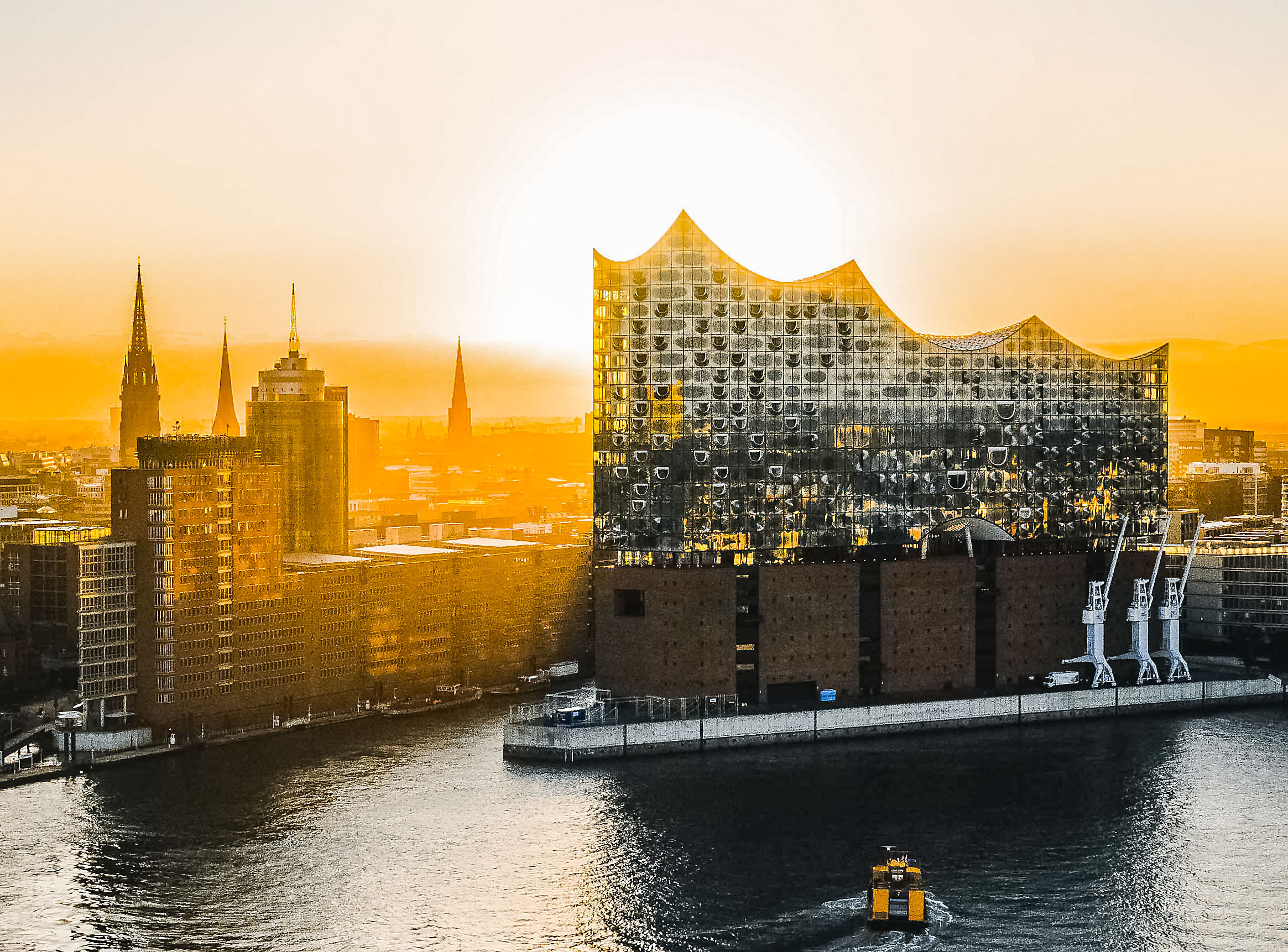
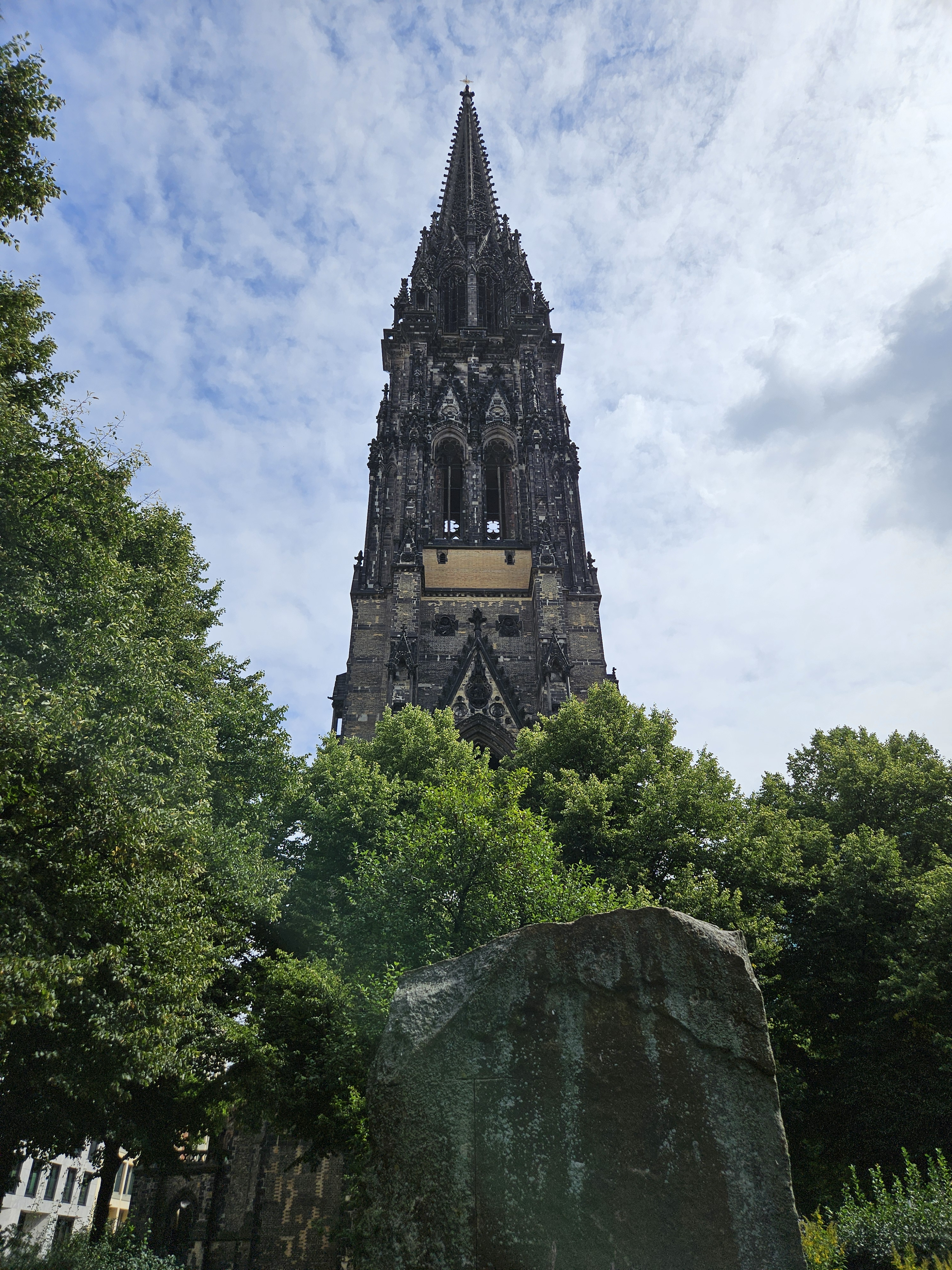
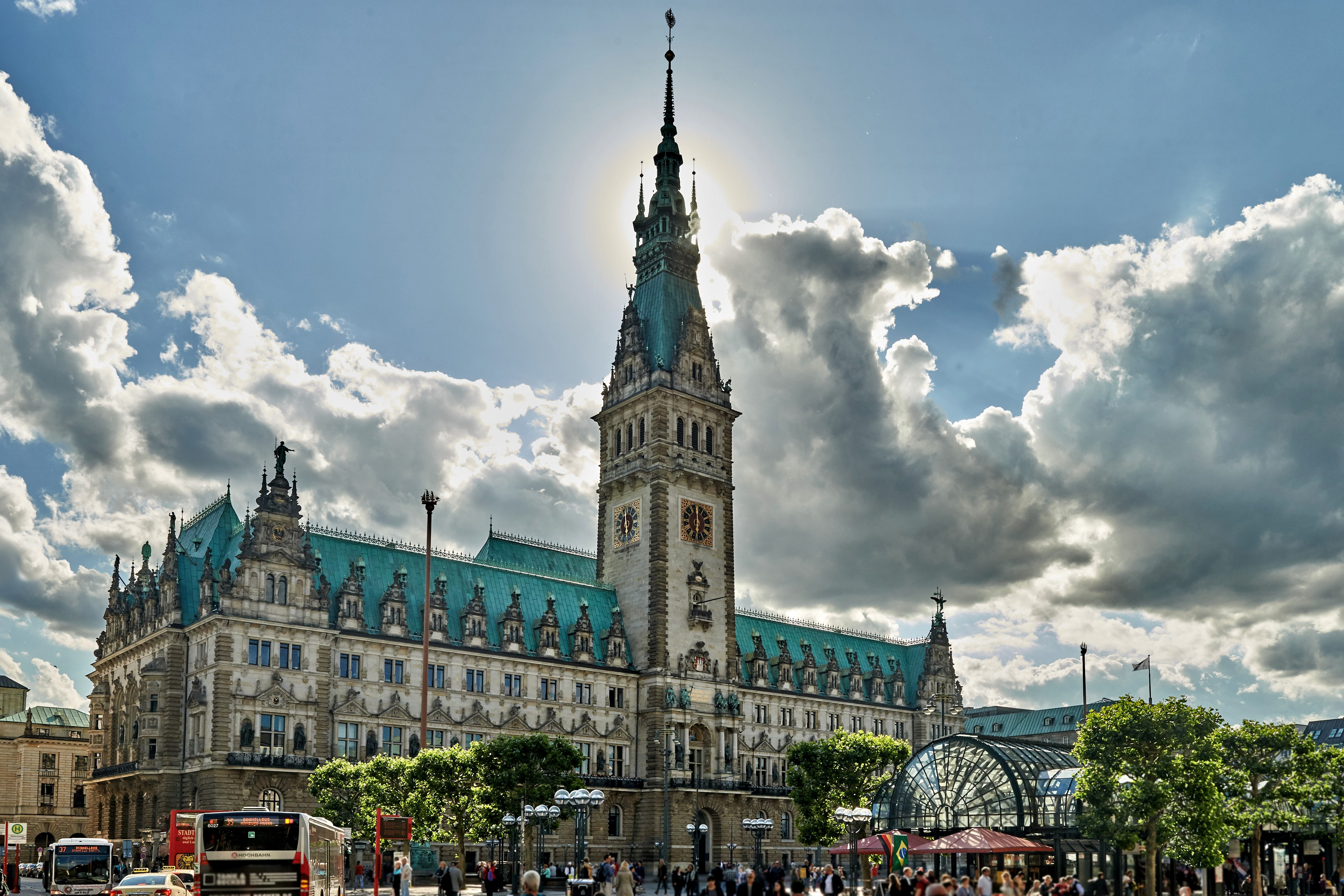
- Inner Alster Lake at dusk St. Pauli Piers HafenCity Speicherstadt Elbphilharmonie St. Nicholas Church Hamburg City Hall St. Michael's Church

- Flag Coat of arms Brandmark
- Interactive map of Free and Hanseatic City of Hamburg
- Location within Germany Location within Europe
- Coordinates: 53°33′N 10°00′E
- Country: Germany

Government
  - Body: Hamburg Parliament
  - First Mayor: Peter Tschentscher (SPD)
  - Second Mayor: Katharina Fegebank (Greens)
  - Governing parties: SPD / Greens
  - Bundesrat votes: 3 (of 69)
  - Bundestag seats: 13 (of 630) (as of 2025)

Area
  - City: 755.09 km^{2} (291.54 sq mi)

Population (2024-12-31)
  - City: 1,973,896
  - Rank: 2nd in Germany
  - Density: 2,614.1/km^{2} (6,770.5/sq mi)
  - Urban: 2,496,600
  - Metro: 5,425,628
- Demonym(s): German: Hamburger (male), Hamburgerin (female); English: Hamburger(s), Hamburgian(s)

GDP
  - City: €168.300 billion (2025)
  - Per capita: €90,359 (2025)
- Time zone: UTC+1 (Central (CET))
  - Summer (DST): UTC+2 (Central (CEST))
- Postal code(s): 20001–21149, 22001–22769
- Area code(s): 040
- ISO 3166 code: DE-HH
- Vehicle registration: HH (1906–1945; again since 1956); MGH (1945); H (1945–1947); HG (1947); BH (1948–1956)
- NUTS Region: DE6
- HDI (2022): 0.975 very high · 1st of 16
- Website: hamburg.com

Hamburg, (Note: /ˈhæmbɜːrɡ/ HAM-burg; German: [ˈhambʊʁk], locally also [ˈhambʊɪ̯ç]; Low Saxon: Hamborg [ˈhambɔːç].) officially the Free and Hanseatic City of Hamburg, (Note: German: Freie und Hansestadt Hamburg; Low Saxon: Friee un Hansestadt Hamborg.) is the second-largest city in Germany after Berlin and sixth-largest city in the European Union, with a population of over 1.9 million. The Hamburg Metropolitan Region has a population of over 5.1 million and is the tenth-largest metropolitan region by GDP in the European Union. At the base of the Jutland Peninsula, the 110 km (68 mi)-long Elbe estuary begins in Hamburg, at the confluence of the Alster and Bille. Hamburg is one of Germany's three city-states alongside Berlin and Bremen, and is surrounded by Schleswig-Holstein to the north and Lower Saxony to the south. The Port of Hamburg is Germany's largest and Europe's third-largest, after Rotterdam and Antwerp. The local dialect is a variant of Low Saxon.

The official name reflects Hamburg's history as a member of the medieval Hanseatic League and a free imperial city of the Holy Roman Empire. Before the 1871 unification of Germany, it was a fully sovereign city state, and before 1919 formed a civic republic headed constitutionally by a class of hereditary Grand Burghers, or Hanseaten. Beset by disasters such as the Great Fire of Hamburg in 1842, the Allied fire-bombing of the city in 1943, and North Sea flood of 1962, the city has managed to recover and emerge wealthier after each catastrophe. Major regional broadcaster NDR, the printing and publishing firm Gruner + Jahr and the newspapers Der Spiegel and Die Zeit are based in the city. Hamburg is the seat of Germany's oldest stock exchange and the world's oldest merchant bank, Berenberg Bank. Media, commercial, logistical, and industrial firms with significant locations in the city include multinationals Airbus, Blohm + Voss, Aurubis, Beiersdorf, Lufthansa and Unilever.

Hamburg is also a major European science, research, and education hub, with several universities and institutions, including the University of Hamburg, and the Deutsches Elektronen-Synchrotron Laboratory DESY. The city enjoys a very high quality of living, being ranked 28th in the 2024 Mercer Quality of Living Survey. Hamburg hosts specialists in world economics and international law, including consular and diplomatic missions such as the International Tribunal for the Law of the Sea, the EU-LAC Foundation, and the UNESCO Institute for Lifelong Learning, multipartite international political conferences and summits such as Europe and China and the G20. Former German chancellors Helmut Schmidt and Angela Merkel were both born in Hamburg. The former Mayor of Hamburg, Olaf Scholz, was chancellor from December 2021 until May 2025.

Hamburg is a major international and domestic tourist destination. The Speicherstadt and Kontorhausviertel were declared World Heritage Sites by UNESCO in 2015. Hamburg's rivers and canals are crossed by around 2,500 bridges, making it the city with the highest number of bridges in Europe, and Hamburg is also home to five of the world's 29 tallest churches, making it the city with the greatest number of churches surpassing 100 metres (330 ft) worldwide. Aside from its rich architectural heritage, the city is also home to notable cultural venues such as the Elbphilharmonie and Laeiszhalle concert halls. It gave birth to movements like Hamburger Schule and paved the way for bands including the Beatles. Hamburg is also known for several theatres and a variety of musical shows. St. Pauli's Reeperbahn is among the best-known European red-light districts.

== History ==
=== Origins ===
Claudius Ptolemy (2nd century AD) reported the first name for the vicinity as Treva.

=== Etymology ===
The name Hamburg comes from the first permanent building on the site, a castle which the Emperor Charlemagne ordered constructed in AD 808. It rose on rocky terrain in a marsh between the Alster and the Elbe rivers as a defence against Slavic incursion, and acquired the name Hammaburg, burg meaning castle or fort. The origin of the Hamma term remains uncertain, but its location is estimated to be at the site of today's Hammaburgplatz.

=== Medieval Hamburg ===
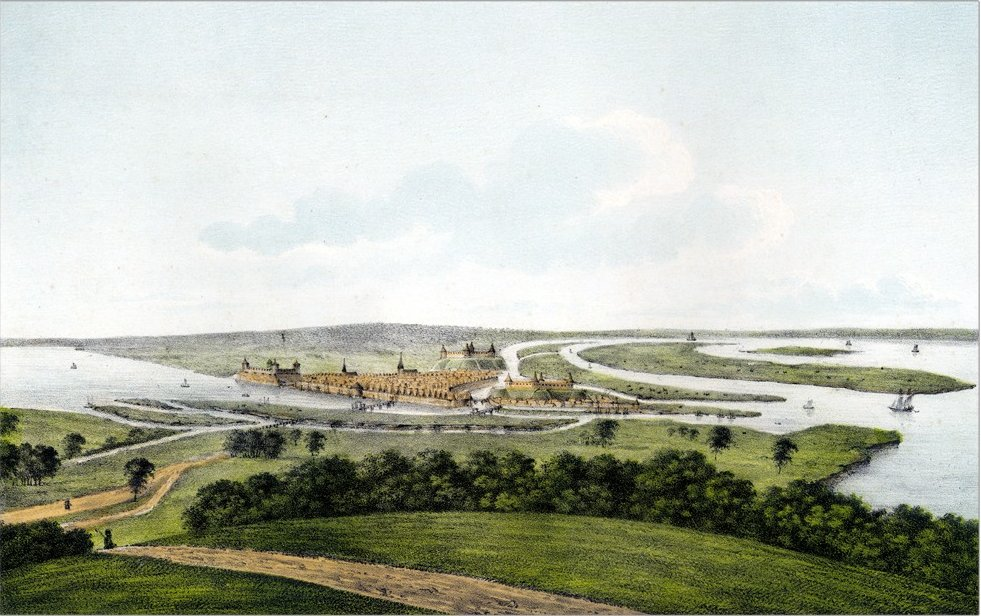
Hamburg in 1150 (painting from 1835)

In 834 AD, Hamburg was established as the seat of a bishopric. Its first bishop, Ansgar, later known as the Apostle of the North, founded the city's early Christian institutions. Two years later, Hamburg was linked with Bremen to form the Bishopric of Hamburg-Bremen.

Hamburg faced repeated destruction in its early centuries. In 845, a fleet of 600 Viking ships sailed up the River Elbe and destroyed the town, which then had about 500 inhabitants. In 1030, King Mieszko II Lambert of the Kingdom of Poland burned the city, and in 1201 and 1214 it was raided and occupied by Valdemar II of Denmark. The Black Death reached Hamburg in 1350, killing at least 60% of its population, and the city also suffered several major fires in the medieval period.

A major turning point came in 1189 when Frederick Barbarossa granted Hamburg the status of a Free Imperial City. The imperial charter included tax-free passage down the Lower Elbe to the North Sea (a form of free-trade zone). In 1265, an allegedly forged charter was presented to or by the Rat (council) of Hamburg.

Hamburg's location between the North Sea and Baltic Sea trade routes helped it become a major port in Northern Europe. Its 1241 alliance with Lübeck is regarded as the founding moment of the Hanseatic League. On 8 November 1266, a contract between Henry III of England and Hamburg's merchants allowed them to establish a hanse in London — the first recorded use of the word for the League's trading guild.

In 1270, Jordan von Boitzenburg, solicitor to the Senate of Hamburg, wrote the Ordeelbook, the first description of civil, criminal and procedural law for a German city in the German language. On 10 August 1410, civil unrest resulted in a negotiated compromise (German: Rezeß), considered the first constitution of Hamburg.

On 25 February 1356 — the first day of spring in medieval reckoning — the Matthiae-Mahl feast for Hanseatic League cities was celebrated for the first time. It continues today as the world's oldest ceremonial meal.

=== Early modern period ===
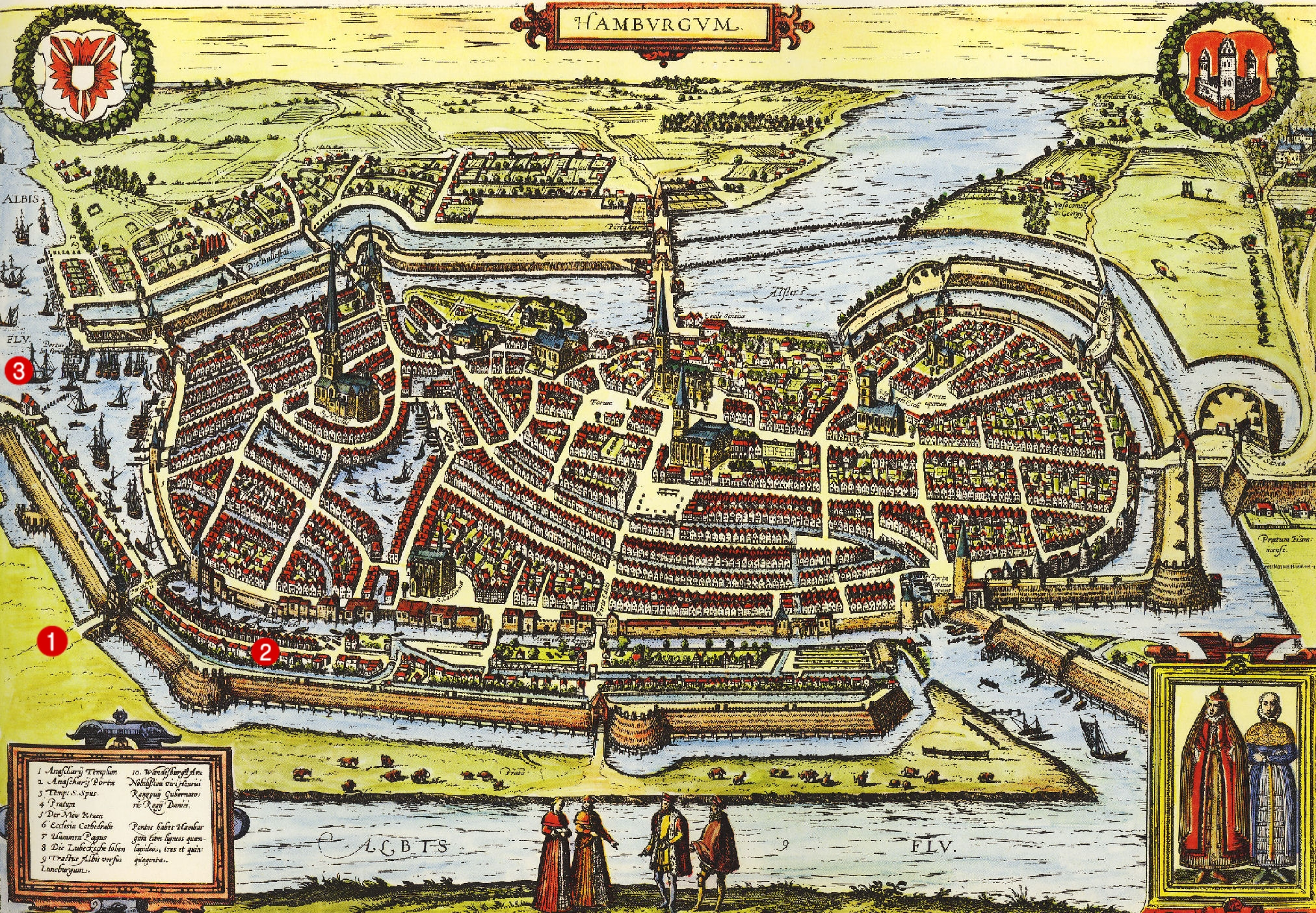
Hamburg as a walled town, c. 1600

In 1529, the city embraced Lutheranism, and it received Reformed refugees from the Netherlands and France.

When Jan van Valckenborgh introduced a second layer to the fortifications to protect against the Thirty Years' War in the seventeenth century, he extended Hamburg and created a "New Town" (Neustadt) whose street names are still based upon the grid system of roads he introduced.

From the autumn of 1696 to the spring of 1697, the Company of Scotland trading to Africa and the Indies was active in Hamburg. While it was unsuccessful in raising capital locally, it commissioned the construction of four vessels in the port. The Caledonia, a ship of 600 tons with 56 guns, and the Instuaration (later renamed the St. Andrew), a vessel of 350 tons, were launched in March 1697.

Upon the dissolution of the Holy Roman Empire in 1806, the Free Imperial City of Hamburg was not incorporated into a larger administrative area while retaining special privileges (mediatised), but became a sovereign state with the official title of the Free and Hanseatic City of Hamburg. Hamburg was briefly annexed by Napoleon I to the First French Empire (1804–1814/1815). Russian forces under General Bennigsen finally freed the city in 1814. Hamburg re-assumed its pre-1811 status as a city-state in 1814. The Congress of Vienna of 1815 confirmed Hamburg's independence and it became one of 39 sovereign states of the German Confederation (1815–1866).

In 1842, about a quarter of the inner city was destroyed in the Great Fire of Hamburg. The fire started on the night of 4 May and was not extinguished until 8 May. It destroyed three churches, the town hall, and many other buildings. 51 people were killed and an estimated 20,000 people were left homeless. Reconstruction took more than 40 years.

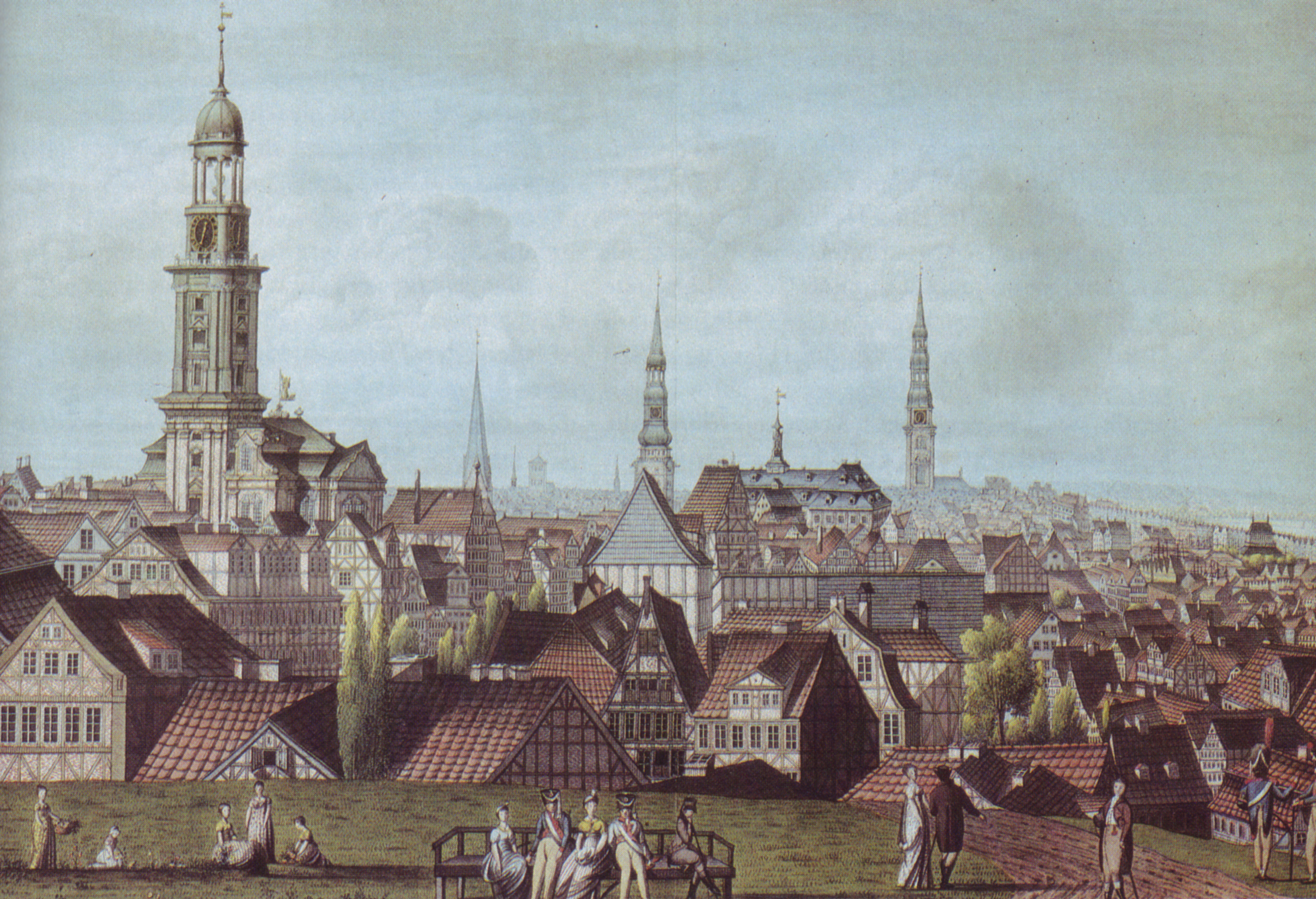
Hamburg in 1811

After periodic political unrest, particularly during the Revolutions of 1848, Hamburg adopted in 1860 a semidemocratic constitution that provided for the election of the Senate, the governing body of the city-state, by adult taxpaying males. Other innovations included the separation of powers, the separation of Church and State, freedom of the press, of assembly and association. Hamburg became a member of the North German Confederation (1866–1871) and of the German Empire (1871–1918), and maintained its self-ruling status during the Weimar Republic (1919–1933). Hamburg acceded to the German Customs Union or Zollverein in 1888, the last (along with Bremen) of the German states to join. The city experienced its fastest growth during the second half of the 19th century when its population more than quadrupled to 800,000 as the growth of the city's Atlantic trade helped make it Europe's second-largest port. The Hamburg America Line, with Albert Ballin as its director, became the world's largest transatlantic shipping company around the start of the 20th century. Shipping companies sailing to South America, Africa, India and East Asia were based in the city. Hamburg was the departure port for many Germans and Eastern Europeans to emigrate to the United States in the late 19th and early 20th centuries. Trading communities from all over the world established themselves there.

A major outbreak of cholera in 1892 was badly handled by the city government, which retained an unusual degree of independence for a German city. About 8,600 died in the largest German epidemic of the late 19th century, and the last major cholera epidemic in a major city of the Western world.

=== Second World War ===
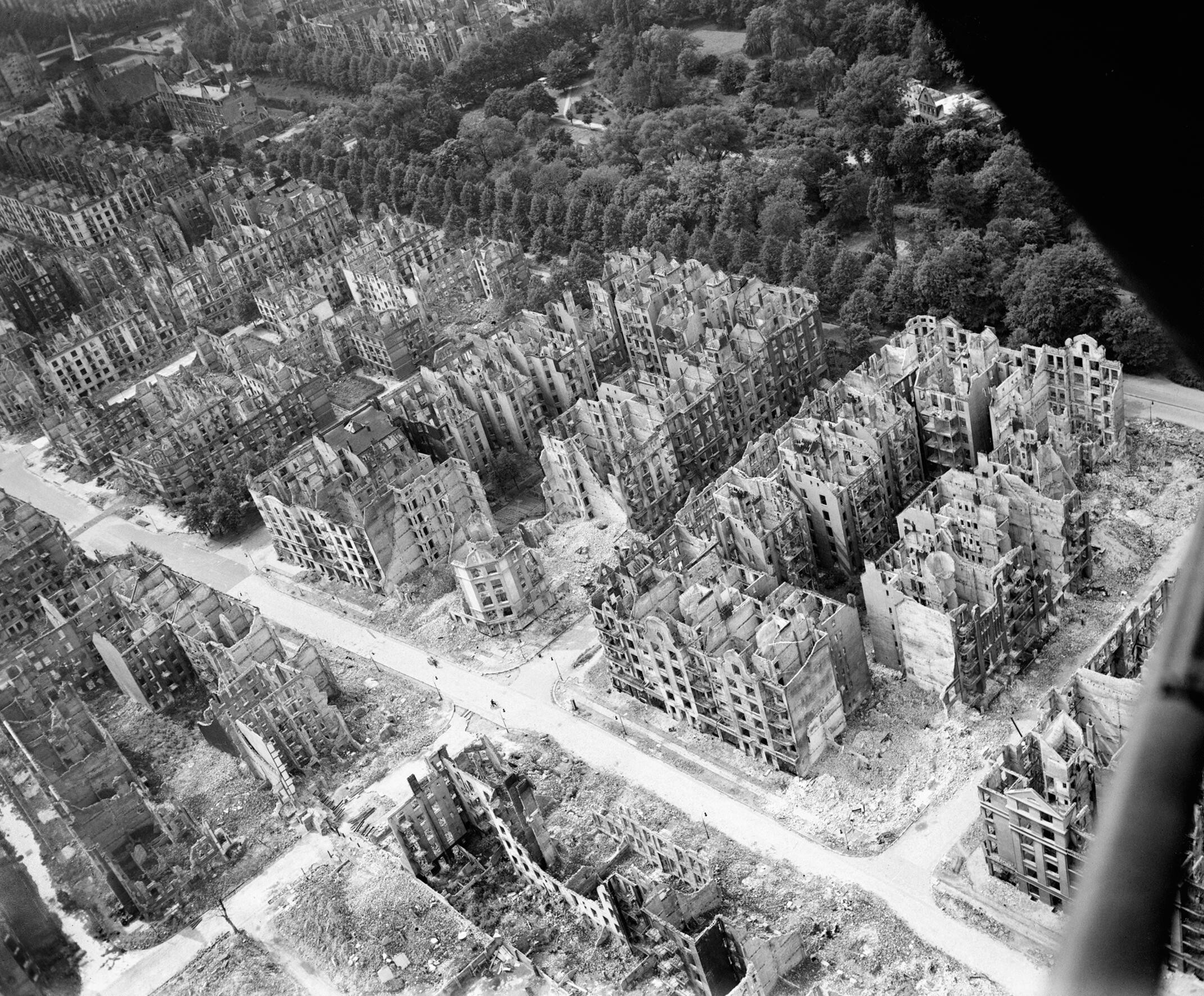
Aerial view of Hamburg-Eilbek following the 1943 bombing raids. The RAF targeted densely populated residential districts in eastern Hamburg during Operation Gomorrah, which killed an estimated 35,000–40,000 people.

Hamburg was a Gau within the administrative division of Nazi Germany from 1934 until 1945. The bombing of Hamburg in World War II devastated much of the city and the harbour. On 23 July 1943, the Royal Air Force (RAF) and United States Army Air Force firebombing created a firestorm which spread from the Hauptbahnhof (main railway station) and quickly moved south-east, completely destroying entire boroughs such as Hammerbrook, Eilbek, Billbrook and Hamm South. Tens of thousands of people perished in these densely populated working class boroughs. The raids, codenamed Operation Gomorrah by the RAF, killed approximately 35,000–40,000 people. About 900,000 civilians were evacuated in the aftermath of the raids. While some of the boroughs destroyed were rebuilt as residential districts after the war, others such as Hammerbrook were entirely developed into office, retail and limited residential or industrial districts. Today around 25% of Hamburg's buildings are from before the Second World War.

The Hamburg Commonwealth War Graves Commission Cemetery is in the greater Ohlsdorf Cemetery in the north of Hamburg.

At least 42,900 people are thought to have perished in the Neuengamme concentration camp (about 25 km, 16 mi outside the city in the marshlands), mostly from epidemics and in the destruction of Kriegsmarine vessels housing evacuees at the end of the war.

Systematic deportations of Jewish Germans and Gentile Germans of Jewish descent started on 18 October 1941. These were all directed to ghettos in Nazi-occupied Europe or to Nazi concentration camps. Most deported persons perished in the Holocaust. By the end of 1942, the Jüdischer Religionsverband in Hamburg was dissolved as an independent legal entity and its remaining assets and staff were assumed by the Reich Association of Jews in Germany (District Northwest). On 10 June 1943, the Reich Security Main Office dissolved the association by a decree. The few remaining employees not somewhat protected by a mixed marriage were deported from Hamburg on 23 June to Theresienstadt, where most of them perished. About 7800 Hamburg Jews were murdered in the Holocaust, of the nearly 17 thousand who had lived in the city before Hitler's rise to power.

=== Post-war history ===
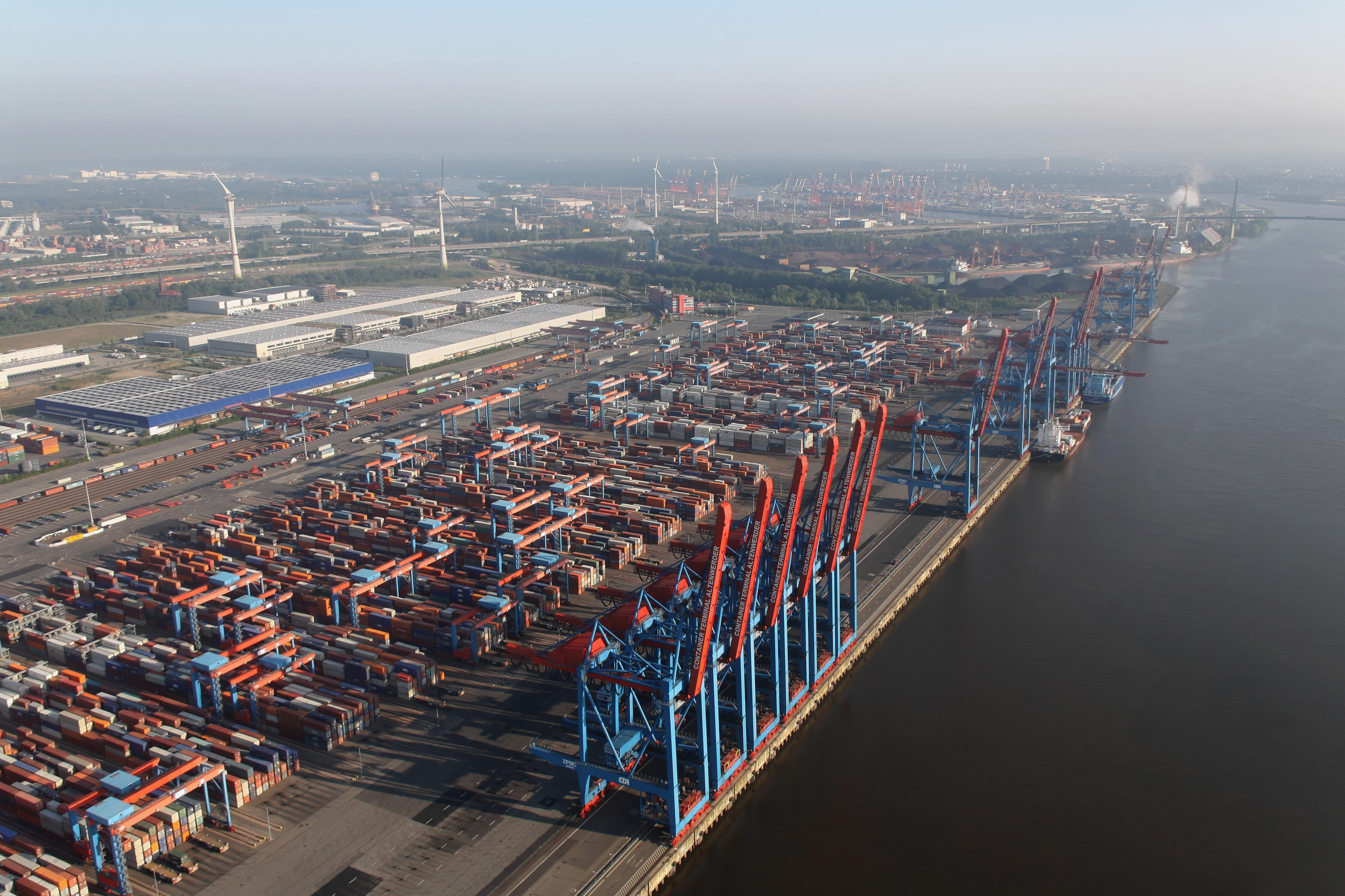
Container Terminal at the Port of Hamburg

The city was surrendered to British Forces on 3 May 1945, in the Capture of Hamburg, three days after Adolf Hitler's death. After the Second World War, Hamburg formed part of the British Zone of Occupation; it became a state of West Germany in 1949.

The North Sea flood of 1962 caused the Elbe to rise to an all-time high, inundating one-fifth of Hamburg and killing more than 300 people.

The inner German border – only 50 kilometres (30 mi) east of Hamburg – separated the city from much of its hinterland and reduced Hamburg's global trade. Since German reunification in 1990, and the accession of several Central European and Baltic countries into the European Union in 2004, the Port of Hamburg has restarted ambitions for regaining its position as the region's largest deep-sea port for container shipping and its major commercial and trading hub.

== Geography ==
Hamburg is at a sheltered natural harbour on the southern fanning-out of the Jutland Peninsula, between Continental Europe to the south and Scandinavia to the north, with the North Sea to the west and the Baltic Sea to the northeast. It is on the River Elbe at its confluence with the Alster and Bille. The city centre is around the Binnenalster ("Inner Alster") and Außenalster ("Outer Alster"), both formed by damming the Alster river to create lakes. The islands of Neuwerk, Scharhörn, and Nigehörn, 100 kilometres (60 mi) away in the Hamburg Wadden Sea National Park, are also part of the city of Hamburg.

The neighbourhoods of Neuenfelde, Cranz, Francop and Finkenwerder are part of the Altes Land (old land) region, the largest contiguous fruit-producing region in Central Europe. Neugraben-Fischbek has Hamburg's highest elevation, the Hasselbrack at 116.2 metres (381 ft) AMSL. Hamburg borders the states of Schleswig-Holstein and Lower Saxony.

=== Climate ===
Hamburg has an oceanic climate (Köppen: Cfb; Trewartha: Dobk), influenced by its proximity to the coast and maritime influences that originate over the Atlantic Ocean. The location in the north of Germany provides extremes greater than typical marine climates, but definitely in the category due to the prevailing westerlies. Nearby wetlands enjoy a maritime temperate climate. The amount of snowfall has varied greatly in recent decades. In the late 1970s and early 1980s, heavy snowfall sometimes occurred, the winters of recent years have been less cold, with snowfall just a few days per year.

The warmest months are June, July, and August, with high temperatures of 20.1 to 22.5 °C (68.2 to 72.5 °F). The coldest are December, January, and February, with low temperatures of −0.3 to 1.0 °C (31.5 to 33.8 °F). The annual extreme temperatures range from −29.1 °C (−20.4 °F) on 13 February 1940, to 40.1 °C (104.2 °F) on 20 July 2022, and the latter was measured at Hamburg-Neuwiedenthal Meteorological Station, on the same day, a high temperature record of 39.1 °C (102.4 °F) was recorded at Hamburg Airport.

Climate data for Hamburg-Fuhlsbüttel WMO ID: 10147; coordinates 53°37′59″N 9°59′17″E; elevation: 10.7 m (35 ft); 1991–2020 normals, extremes 1936–present
Month	Jan	Feb	Mar	Apr	May	Jun	Jul	Aug	Sep	Oct	Nov	Dec	Year
Record high °C (°F)	15.7 (60.3)	18.9 (66.0)	23.5 (74.3)	29.7 (85.5)	33.5 (92.3)	39.0 (102.2)	39.1 (102.4)	37.3 (99.1)	32.3 (90.1)	27.1 (80.8)	20.2 (68.4)	15.7 (60.3)	39.1 (102.4)
Mean maximum °C (°F)	10.9 (51.6)	11.9 (53.4)	16.6 (61.9)	22.3 (72.1)	26.8 (80.2)	29.6 (85.3)	31.1 (88.0)	31.0 (87.8)	25.6 (78.1)	20.0 (68.0)	14.5 (58.1)	11.4 (52.5)	32.2 (90.0)
Mean daily maximum °C (°F)	4.2 (39.6)	5.2 (41.4)	8.7 (47.7)	13.9 (57.0)	18.0 (64.4)	20.9 (69.6)	23.2 (73.8)	23.0 (73.4)	18.8 (65.8)	13.6 (56.5)	8.2 (46.8)	5.0 (41.0)	13.6 (56.5)
Daily mean °C (°F)	2.1 (35.8)	2.4 (36.3)	4.9 (40.8)	9.1 (48.4)	13.0 (55.4)	16.0 (60.8)	18.3 (64.9)	18.0 (64.4)	14.4 (57.9)	10.0 (50.0)	5.7 (42.3)	2.9 (37.2)	9.7 (49.5)
Mean daily minimum °C (°F)	−0.5 (31.1)	−0.5 (31.1)	1.1 (34.0)	4.0 (39.2)	7.6 (45.7)	10.8 (51.4)	13.3 (55.9)	13.1 (55.6)	10.1 (50.2)	6.3 (43.3)	2.9 (37.2)	0.4 (32.7)	5.7 (42.3)
Mean minimum °C (°F)	−9.5 (14.9)	−8.1 (17.4)	−5.5 (22.1)	−2.7 (27.1)	0.7 (33.3)	5.5 (41.9)	8.6 (47.5)	7.9 (46.2)	4.2 (39.6)	−0.9 (30.4)	−3.7 (25.3)	−7.4 (18.7)	−11.6 (11.1)
Record low °C (°F)	−22.8 (−9.0)	−29.1 (−20.4)	−15.3 (4.5)	−7.1 (19.2)	−5.0 (23.0)	0.6 (33.1)	3.4 (38.1)	1.8 (35.2)	−1.2 (29.8)	−7.1 (19.2)	−15.4 (4.3)	−18.5 (−1.3)	−29.1 (−20.4)
Average precipitation mm (inches)	66.7 (2.63)	54.9 (2.16)	56.7 (2.23)	39.2 (1.54)	57.8 (2.28)	74.4 (2.93)	81.8 (3.22)	77.5 (3.05)	64.7 (2.55)	63.0 (2.48)	61.1 (2.41)	72.6 (2.86)	770.5 (30.33)
Average extreme snow depth cm (inches)	3.9 (1.5)	4.3 (1.7)	4.1 (1.6)	trace	0 (0)	0 (0)	0 (0)	0 (0)	0 (0)	0 (0)	1.0 (0.4)	2.8 (1.1)	8.8 (3.5)
Average precipitation days (≥ 1.0 mm)	17.7	16.2	15.2	12.8	13.8	15.3	16.0	15.8	14.5	16.2	16.9	18.0	188.4
Average snowy days (≥ 1.0 cm)	5.9	5.0	2.9	0	0	0	0	0	0	0	1.2	3.5	18.5
Average relative humidity (%)	85.8	82.6	77.7	71.0	70.8	72.1	72.6	74.3	79.4	83.4	87.1	87.6	78.7
Mean monthly sunshine hours	44.9	66.8	119.9	182.8	221.2	210.3	218.8	202.7	152.4	109.3	51.4	36.1	1,616.7
Average ultraviolet index	0	1	2	4	5	6	6	5	4	2	1	0	3
Source 1: World Meteorological Organization
Source 2: DWD and Weather Atlas View climate chart 1986–2016 or 1960–1990

== Demographics ==
Hamburg population pyramid in 2022

Historical population
Year	Pop.	±% p.a.
950	500	—
1430	16,000	+0.72%
1840	136,956	+0.53%
1900	705,738	+2.77%
1910	931,035	+2.81%
1920	1,026,989	+0.99%
1930	1,145,124	+1.09%
1940	1,725,500	+4.19%
1945	1,350,278	−4.79%
1950	1,605,606	+3.52%
1961	1,840,543	+1.25%
1970	1,793,640	−0.29%
1975	1,717,383	−0.87%
1980	1,645,095	−0.86%
1985	1,579,884	−0.81%
1990	1,652,363	+0.90%
2001	1,726,363	+0.40%
2011	1,706,696	−0.11%
2022	1,808,846	+0.53%
Population size may be affected by changes in administrative divisions.

20 largest groups of foreign residents
Nationality	Population (31 December 2022)
Turkey	44,280
Ukraine	33,570
Afghanistan	24,635
Poland	23,310
Syria	17,725
Portugal	11,465
Romania	10,510
Iran	9,725
Russia	9,375
Bulgaria	8,830
North Macedonia	7,770
Italy	7,570
Ghana	7,550
Serbia	7,405
Croatia	6,685
India	6,420
China	6,235
Greece	6,095
Spain	6,040
Iraq	5,400

On 31 December 2016, there were 1,860,759 people registered as living in Hamburg in an area of 755.3 km^{2} (291.6 sq mi). The population density was 2,464/km^{2} (6,380/sq mi). The metropolitan area of the Hamburg region (Hamburg Metropolitan Region) is home to 5,107,429 living on 196/km^{2} (510/sq mi).

There were 915,319 women and 945,440 men in Hamburg. For every 1,000 females, there were 1,033 males. In 2015, there were 19,768 births in Hamburg (of which 38.3% were to unmarried women); 6422 marriages and 3190 divorces, and 17,565 deaths. In the city, 16.1% of the population was under the age of 18, while 18.3% was 65 years of age or older. There were 356 people in Hamburg over the age of 100.

According to the Statistical Office for Hamburg and Schleswig-Holstein, there were 631,246 residents with a migrant background, representing 34% of the population. Immigrants come from 200 countries. 5,891 people acquired German cititzenship in 2016.

In 2016, there were 1,021,666 households, of which 17.8% had children under the age of 18; 54.4% of all households were made up of singles. 25.6% of all households were single parent households. The average household size was 1.8.

=== Portuguese community ===
Hamburg has the largest Portuguese community in Germany; the city is home to about 30,000 people of Portuguese heritage. Many Portuguese sailors and merchants came to Hamburg beginning in the 15th century due to its port. Since the 1970s, there has been a district in Hamburg called the Portugiesenviertel (Portuguese quarter) where many Portuguese people settled and which has a variety of Portuguese restaurants, cafes and shops that attract many tourists. There are several statues, squares and streets in Hamburg that are named after Portuguese historical figures. These include the Vasco da Gama statue on the Kornhaus bridge, which was suggested by Portuguese residents to bring visibility to the Portuguese community in Hamburg.

=== Chinese community ===
Hamburg's position as an international port meant that the city was home to one of Germany's earliest established Chinese communities, initially formed by sailors and merchants. During the 1920s, a small but vibrant Chinatown emerged around Schmuckstraße in St. Pauli, with Chinese-owned restaurants, shops and boarding houses. Chinese migrants during this era were mainly consisted of sailors from Guangdong, as well as itinerant traders from Qingtian in Zhejiang province. The community was devastated by Nazi persection during the Second World War, culminating in the "Chinesenaktion" of May 1944 that left the Chinatown in ruin.

After the war, only 30 Chinese men remained in Hamburg, though the community gradually recovered through surviving businesses and renewed migration, particularly through the expansion of Chinese restaurants and other industries from the 1950s onwards, attracting migrants from different parts of China and the wider Chinese diaspora.

=== Afghan community ===
Hamburg's Afghan community of about 50,000 people is the largest not only in Germany, but also in Europe. They first came to Hamburg in the 1970s before expanding during the Afghan conflict in the 1980s and 1990s where many Afghan migrants chose to live in Hamburg. After 2015 the Afghan population almost doubled due to a new influx from the migrant crisis. There is an area in Hamburg behind the central station where many Afghan restaurants and shops are located. Many carpet businesses in Speicherstadt are operated by Afghan traders, with Hamburg still a global leader in the trade of oriental rugs.

=== Foreign residents ===
The breakdown of all Hamburg residents with foreign citizenship (as of 31 December 2016) by their continent of origin is as follows:

Citizenship	Number	%
Total	288,338	100%
Europe	193,812	67.2%
European Union	109,496	38%
Asian	59,292	20.6%
African	18,996	6.6%
North and South American	11,315	3.9%
Australian and Oceanian	1,234	0.4%

=== Language ===
As elsewhere in Germany, Standard German is spoken in Hamburg, but as typical for northern Germany, the original language of Hamburg is Low German, usually referred to as Hamborger Platt (German Hamburger Platt) or Hamborgsch. Since large-scale standardisation of the German language beginning in earnest in the 18th century, various Low German-coloured dialects have developed (contact-varieties of German on Low Saxon substrates). Originally, there was a range of such Missingsch varieties, the best-known being the low-prestige ones of the working classes and the somewhat more bourgeois Hanseatendeutsch (Hanseatic German), although the term is used in appreciation. All of these are now moribund due to the influences of Standard German used by education and media. However, the former importance of Low German is indicated by several songs, such as the sea shanty Hamborger Veermaster, written in the 19th century when Low German was used more frequently. Many toponyms and street names reflect Low Saxon vocabulary, partially even in Low Saxon spelling, which is not standardised, and to some part in forms adapted to Standard German.

=== Religion ===
Religion in Hamburg – 2025
Religion	Percent
None or other	73.4%
EKD Protestants	18.8%
Roman Catholics	7.8%

In 2025, 73.4% of the population was not religious or adhered to religions other than the Evangelical Church or Catholicism.

In 2025, 18.8% of the population belonged to the Evangelical Lutheran Church in Northern Germany, the largest religious body, and 7.8% to the Roman Catholic Church. Hamburg is the seat of one of the three bishops of the Evangelical Lutheran Church in Northern Germany, as well as of the Roman Catholic Archdiocese of Hamburg.

According to the publication Muslimisches Leben in Deutschland ("Muslim life in Germany"), an estimated 141,900 Muslim migrants (from nearly 50 countries of origin) lived in Hamburg in 2008. About three years later (May 2011) calculations based on census data for 21 countries of origin resulted in a figure of about 143,200 Muslim migrants in Hamburg, making up 8.4% percent of the population. As of 2021, there were more than 50 mosques in the city, including the Ahmadiyya run Fazle Omar Mosque, which is the oldest in the city, and which hosts the Islamic Centre Hamburg.

A Jewish Community also exists. As of 2022, around 2,500 Jews live in Hamburg.

== Government ==
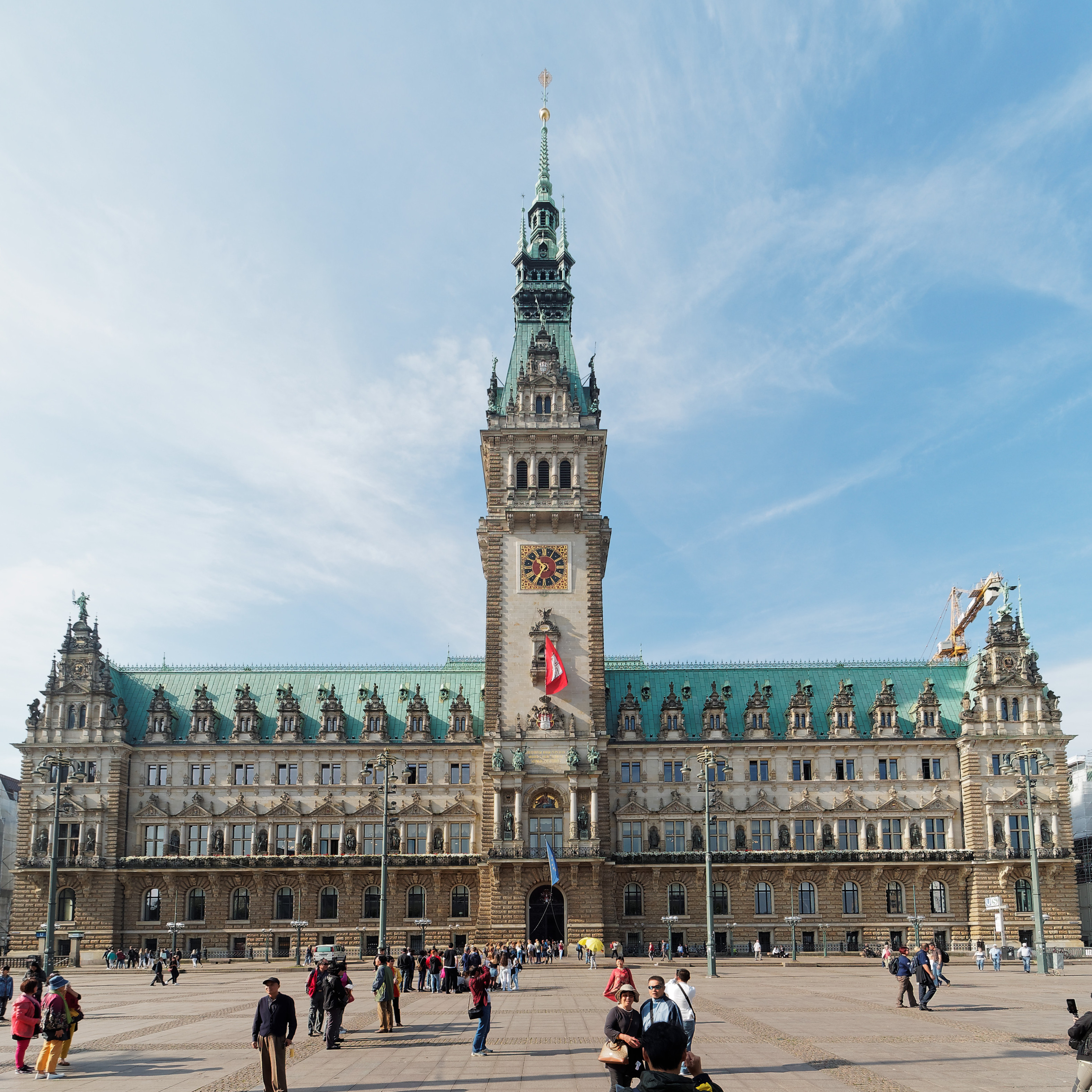
Hamburg City Hall (front view)

The city of Hamburg is one of 16 German states, therefore the Mayor of Hamburg's office corresponds more to the role of a minister-president than to that of a city mayor. As a German state government, it is responsible for public education, correctional institutions and public safety; as a municipality, it is additionally responsible for libraries, recreational facilities, sanitation, water supply and welfare services.

Since 1897, the seat of the government has been Hamburg City Hall (Hamburg Rathaus), with the office of the mayor, the meeting room for the Senate and the floor for the Hamburg Parliament. From 2001 until 2010, the mayor of Hamburg was Ole von Beust, who governed in Germany's first statewide "black-green" coalition, consisting of the conservative CDU Hamburg and the alternative GAL, which are Hamburg's regional wing of the Alliance 90/The Greens party. Von Beust was briefly succeeded by Christoph Ahlhaus in 2010, but the coalition broke apart on 28 November 2010. On 7 March 2011 Olaf Scholz (SPD) became mayor. After the 2015 election the SPD and the Alliance 90/The Greens formed a coalition.

=== Boroughs ===
The 7 boroughs and 104 quarters of Hamburg

Hamburg is made up of seven boroughs (German: Bezirke), which are subdivided into 104 quarters (German: Stadtteile). There are 181 localities (German: Ortsteile). The urban organisation is regulated by the Constitution of Hamburg and several laws. Most of the quarters were former independent cities, towns or villages annexed into Hamburg proper. The last large annexation was done through the Greater Hamburg Act of 1937, when the cities Altona, Harburg, and Wandsbek were merged into the state of Hamburg. The Act of the Constitution and Administration of Hanseatic city of Hamburg established Hamburg as a state and a municipality. Some of the boroughs and quarters have been rearranged several times.

Each borough is governed by a Borough Council (German: Bezirksversammlung) and administered by a Municipal Administrator (German: Bezirksamtsleiter). The boroughs are not independent municipalities: their power is limited and subordinate to the Senate of Hamburg. The borough administrator is elected by the Borough Council and thereafter requires confirmation and appointment by Hamburg's Senate. The quarters have no governing bodies of their own.

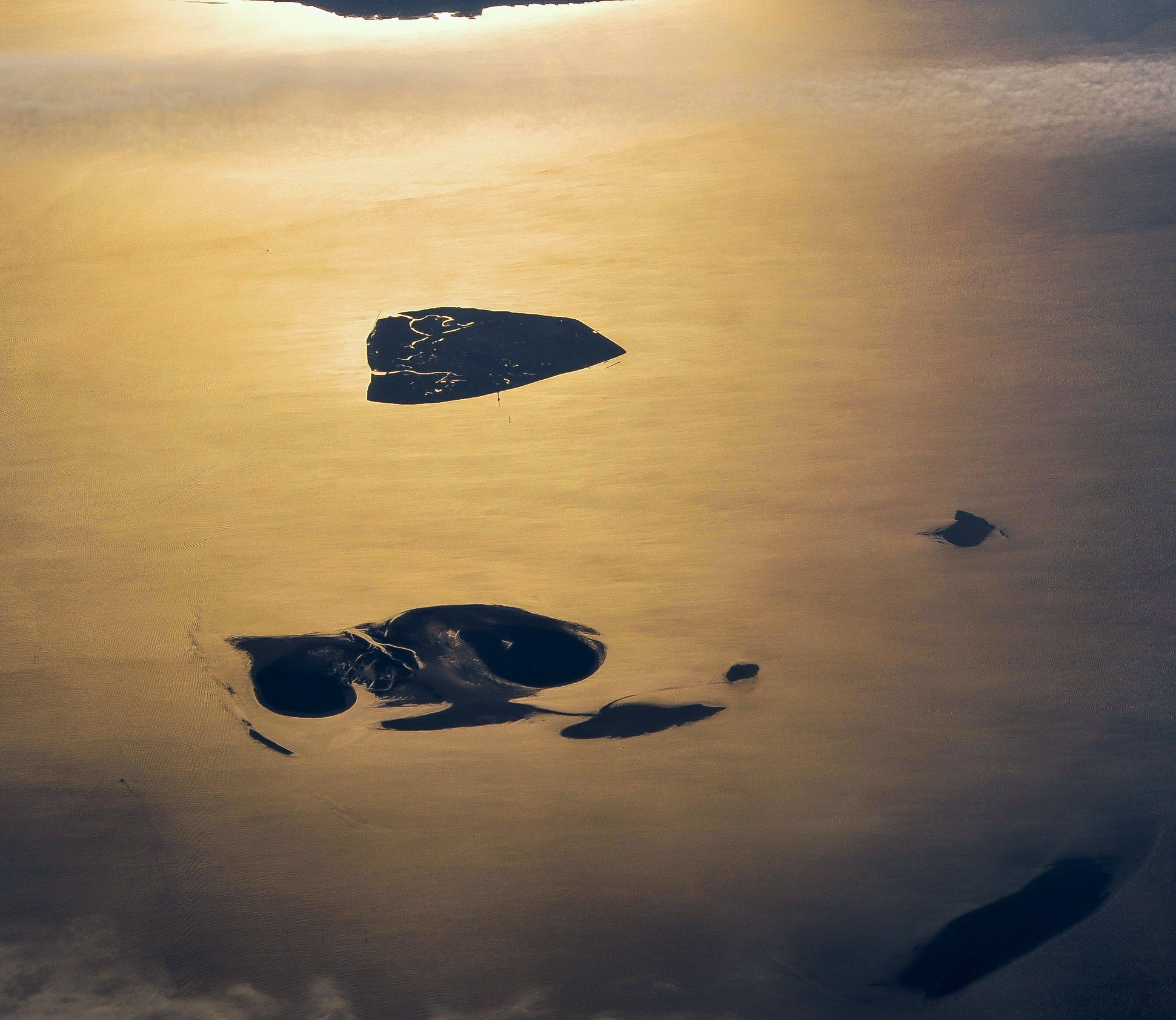
The part of the North Sea in this aerial picture is called the Hamburg Wadden Sea National Park and belongs administratively to the borough of Hamburg-Mitte. Some 50 people live here on the island Neuwerk (visible just above the centre).

Following the latest territorial reform of March 2008, the boroughs are Hamburg-Mitte, Altona, Eimsbüttel, Hamburg-Nord, Wandsbek, Bergedorf, and Harburg.

Hamburg-Mitte ("Hamburg Central") covers mostly the urban core of the city and consists of the quarters Billbrook, Billstedt, Borgfelde, Finkenwerder, HafenCity, Hamm, Hammerbrook, Horn, Kleiner Grasbrook, Neuwerk, Rothenburgsort, St. Georg, St. Pauli, Steinwerder, Veddel, Waltershof, and Wilhelmsburg. The quarters Hamburg-Altstadt ("old town") and Neustadt ("new town") are the historical origin of Hamburg.

Altona is the westernmost urban borough, on the right bank of the Elbe river. From 1640 to 1864, Altona was under the administration of the Danish monarchy. Altona was an independent city until 1937. Politically, the following quarters are part of Altona: Altona-Altstadt, Altona-Nord, Bahrenfeld, Ottensen, Othmarschen, Groß Flottbek, Osdorf, Lurup, Nienstedten, Blankenese, Iserbrook, Sülldorf, Rissen, and Sternschanze.

Bergedorf consists of the quarters Allermöhe, Altengamme, Bergedorf—the centre of the former independent town, Billwerder, Curslack, Kirchwerder, Lohbrügge, Moorfleet, Neuengamme, Neuallermöhe, Ochsenwerder, Reitbrook, Spadenland, and Tatenberg.

Eimsbüttel is split into nine quarters: Eidelstedt, Eimsbüttel, Harvestehude, Hoheluft-West, Lokstedt, Niendorf, Rotherbaum, Schnelsen, and Stellingen. Located within this borough is former Jewish neighbourhood of Grindel.

Hamburg-Nord contains the quarters Alsterdorf, Barmbek-Nord, Barmbek-Süd, Dulsberg, Eppendorf, Fuhlsbüttel, Groß Borstel, Hoheluft-Ost, Hohenfelde, Langenhorn, Ohlsdorf with Ohlsdorf cemetery, Uhlenhorst, and Winterhude.

Harburg is situated on the southern shores of the river Elbe and covers parts of the port of Hamburg, residential and rural areas, and some research institutes. The quarters are Altenwerder, Cranz, Eißendorf, Francop, Gut Moor, Harburg, Hausbruch, Heimfeld, Langenbek, Marmstorf, Moorburg, Neuenfelde, Neugraben-Fischbek, Neuland, Rönneburg, Sinstorf, and Wilstorf.

Wandsbek is divided into the quarters Bergstedt, Bramfeld, Duvenstedt, Eilbek, Farmsen-Berne, Hummelsbüttel, Jenfeld, Lemsahl-Mellingstedt, Marienthal, Poppenbüttel, Rahlstedt, Sasel, Steilshoop, Tonndorf, Volksdorf, Wandsbek, Wellingsbüttel, and Wohldorf-Ohlstedt.

== Cityscape ==
Panoramic view of the Binnenalster with Hamburg City Hall and the Jungfernstieg promenade

=== Architecture ===
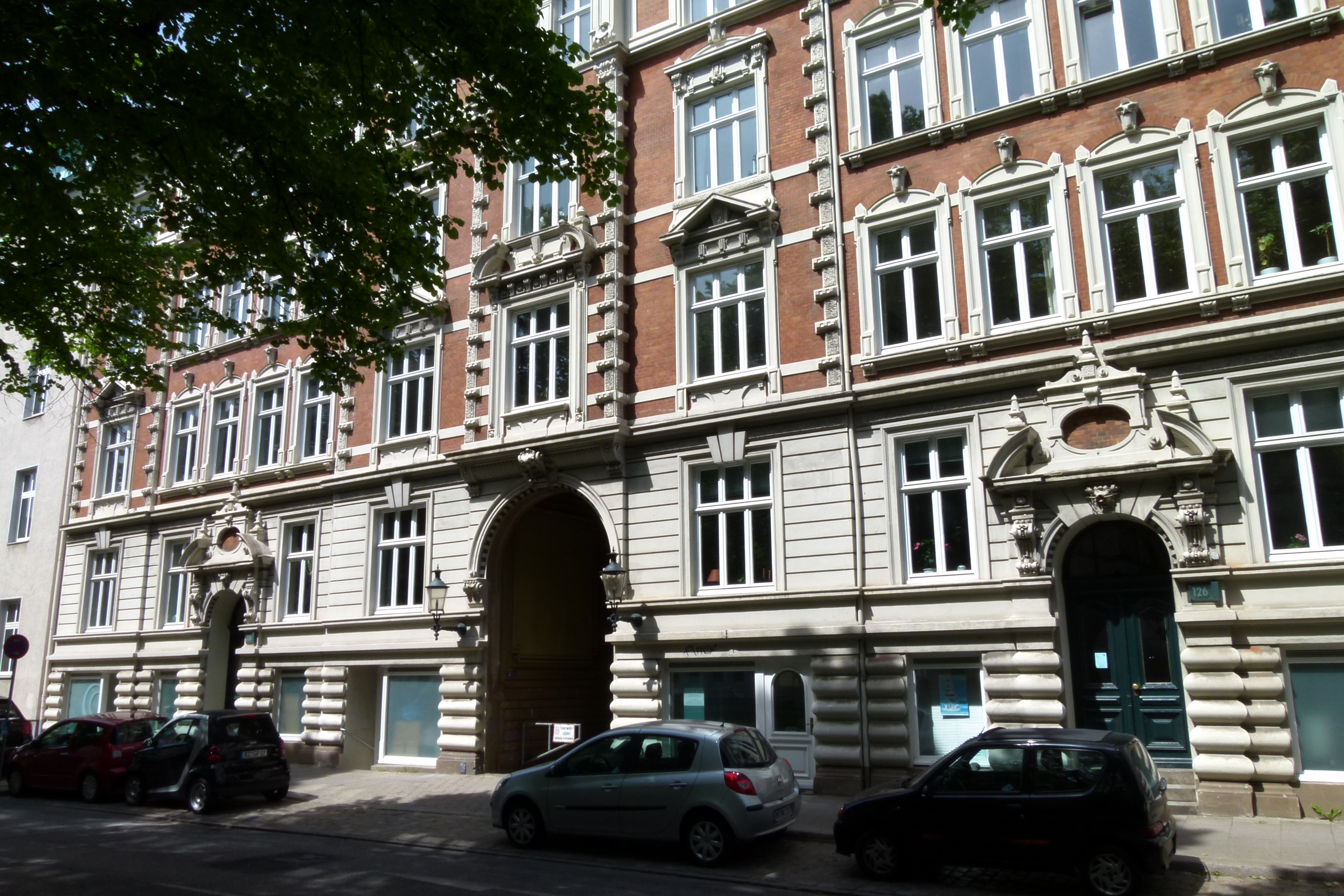
Historicist Palmaille, Altona. Nearly 25,000 buildings in Hamburg are from those Gründerzeit times.

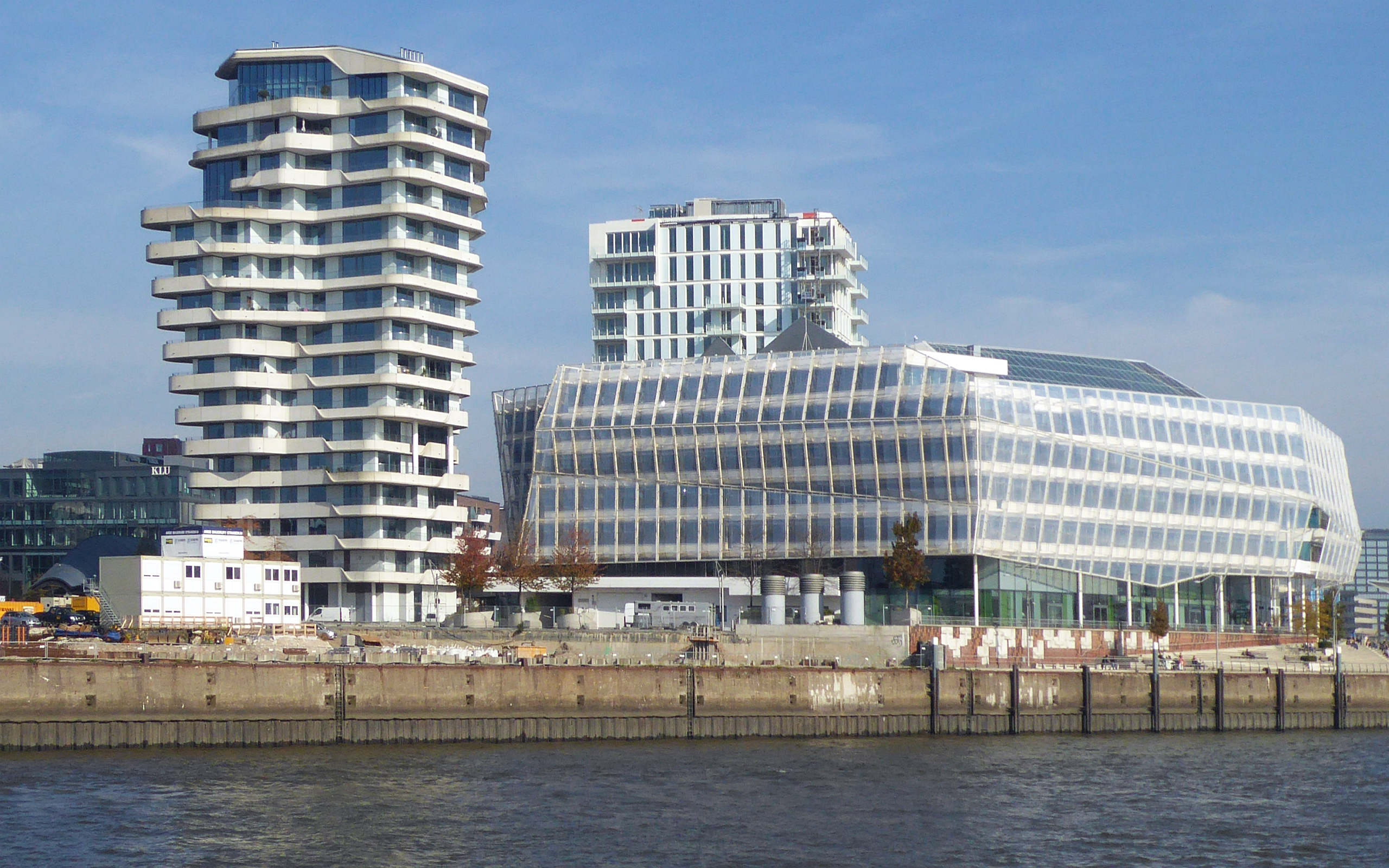
The Marco-Polo-Centre (left) and former Unilever HQ Germany

Hamburg has architecturally significant buildings in a wide range of styles and just one skyscraper under construction (see List of tallest buildings in Hamburg). Churches are important landmarks, such as St Nicholas', which for a short time in the 19th century was the world's tallest building. The skyline features the tall spires of the most important churches (Hauptkirchen) St Michael's (nicknamed "Michel"), St Peter's, St James's (St. Jacobi), and St. Catherine's covered with copper plates, and the Heinrich-Hertz-Turm, the radio and television tower (no longer publicly accessible).

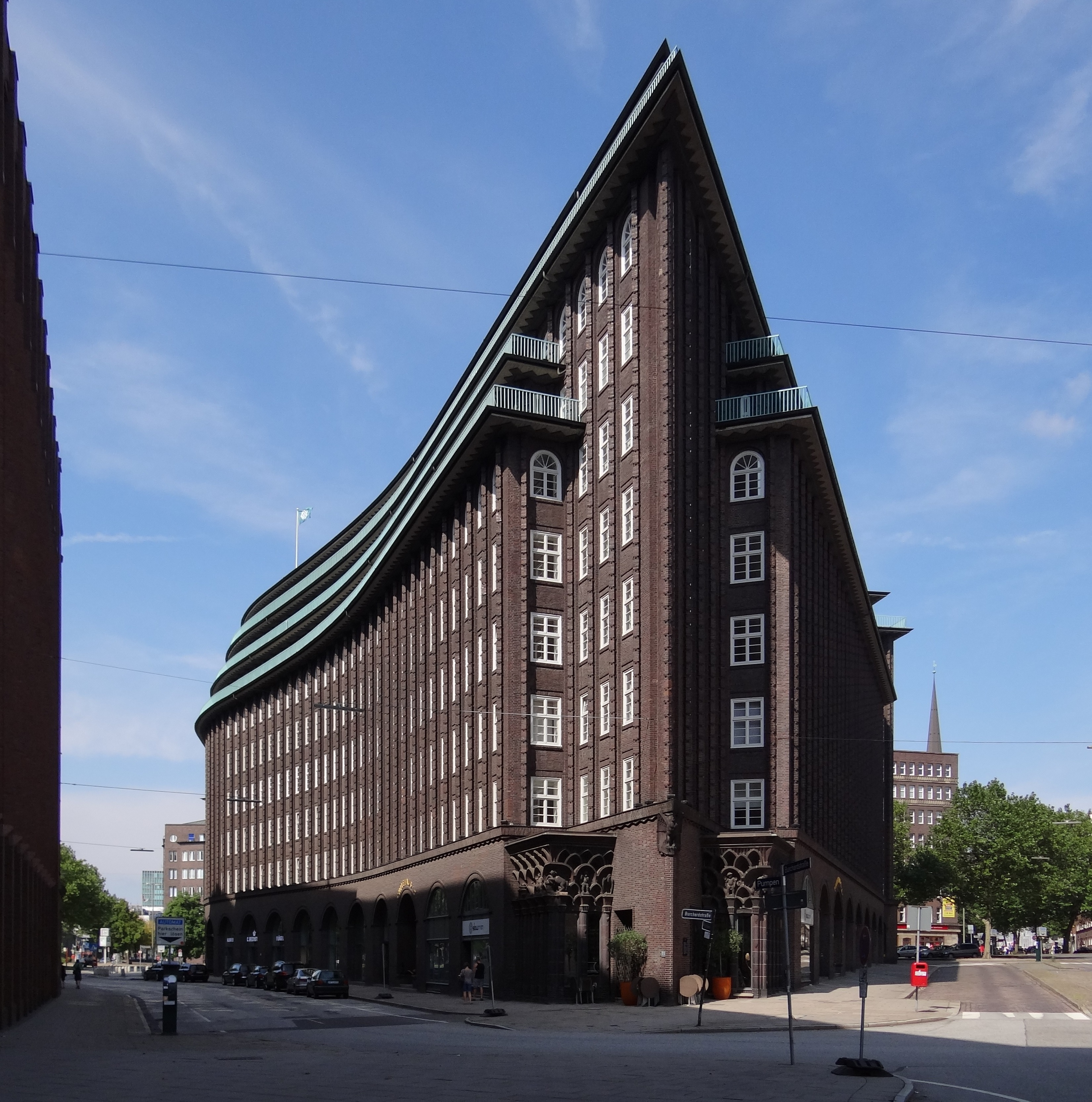
The Chilehaus with a typical brick expressionist façade

The many streams, rivers, and canals are crossed by some 2,500 bridges, more than London, Amsterdam, and Venice put together. Hamburg has more bridges inside its city limits than any other city in the world. The Köhlbrandbrücke, Freihafen Elbbrücken, Lombardsbrücke, and Kennedybrücke dividing Binnenalster from Aussenalster are important roadways.

The town hall is a richly decorated Neo-Renaissance building finished in 1897. The tower is 112 metres (367 ft) high. Its façade, 111 m (364 ft) long, depicts the emperors of the Holy Roman Empire, since Hamburg was, as a Free Imperial City, only under the sovereignty of the emperor. The Chilehaus, a brick expressionist office building built in 1922 and designed by architect Fritz Höger, is shaped like an ocean liner.

Europe's largest urban development since 2008, the HafenCity, will house about 15,000 inhabitants and 45,000 workers. The plan includes designs by Rem Koolhaas and Renzo Piano. The Elbphilharmonie (Elbe Philharmonic Hall), opened in January 2017, houses concerts in a sail-shaped building on top of an old warehouse, designed by architects Herzog & de Meuron.

The many parks are distributed over the whole city to make Hamburg a verdant city. The biggest parks are the Stadtpark, the Ohlsdorf Cemetery, and Planten un Blomen. The Stadtpark, Hamburg's "Central Park", has a great lawn and a huge water tower, which houses one of Europe's biggest planetaria. The park and its buildings were designed by Fritz Schumacher in the 1910s.

=== Parks and gardens ===
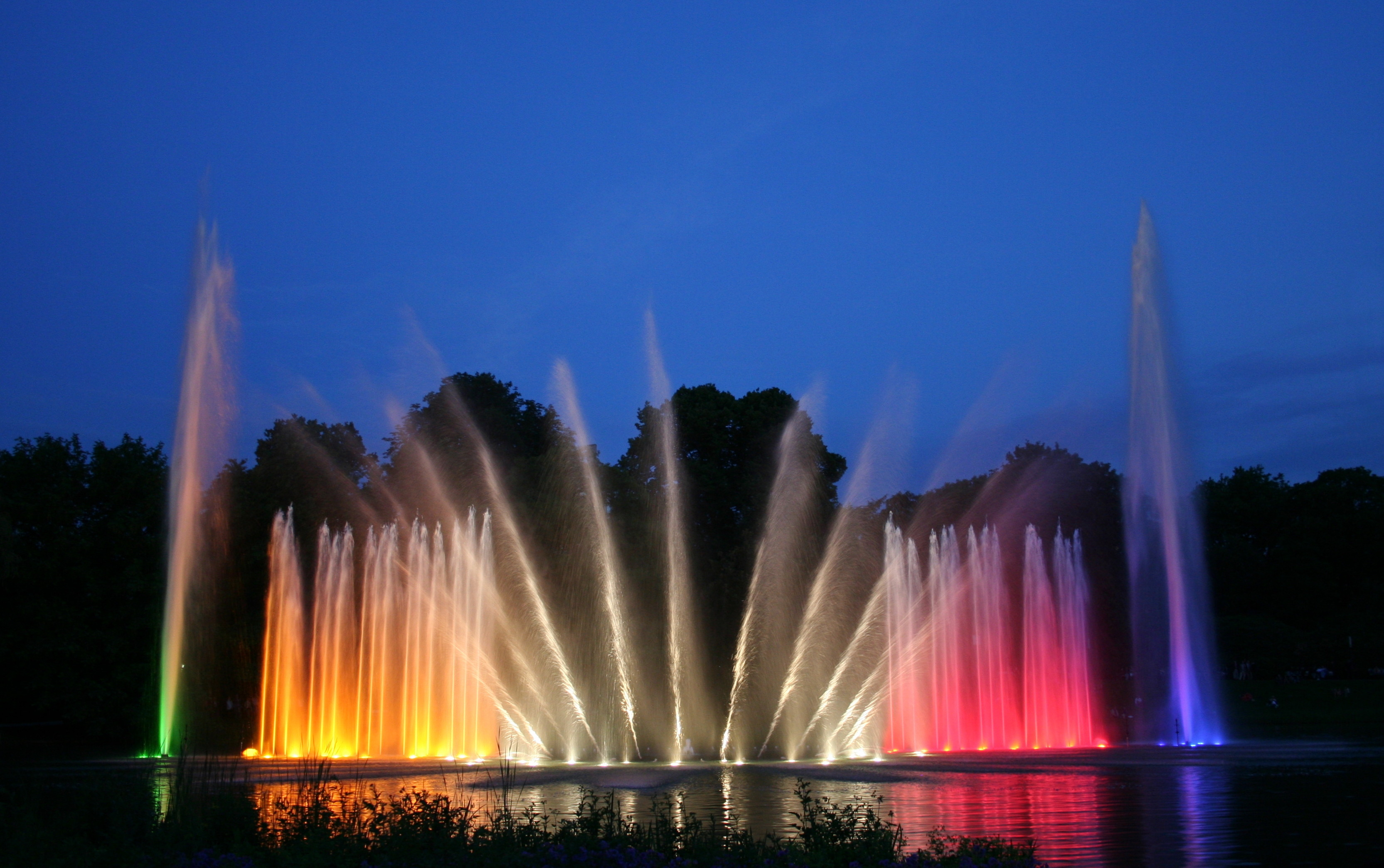
A water-light concert at Planten un Blomen park

The lavish and spacious Planten un Blomen park (Low German dialect for "plants and flowers") located in the centre of Hamburg is the green heart of the city. Within the park are various thematic gardens, the biggest Japanese garden in Germany, and the Alter Botanischer Garten Hamburg, which is a historic botanical garden that now consists primarily of greenhouses.

The Botanischer Garten Hamburg is a modern botanical garden maintained by the University of Hamburg. Besides these, there are many more parks of various sizes. In 2014 Hamburg celebrated a birthday of park culture, where many parks were reconstructed and cleaned up. Moreover, every year there are water-light-concerts in the Planten un Blomen park, from May to early October.

== Culture ==
Abel Seyler, one of the great theatre principals of 18th-century Europe, established Hamburg as a major centre of theatrical innovation in the 1760s.

From the 1760s, the theatre director Abel Seyler—the leader of the Hamburg National Theatre and subsequently the Seyler Theatre Company—established Hamburg as one of the leading European centres of theatrical innovation, promoting experimental productions and pioneering a new more realist style of acting, introducing Shakespeare to a German-language audience, and promoting the concept of a national theatre in the tradition of Ludvig Holberg, the Sturm und Drang playwrights, and serious German opera.

Today Hamburg has more than 40 theatres, 60 museums, and 100 music venues and clubs. With 6.6 music venues per 100,000 inhabitants, Hamburg has the second-highest density of music venues of Germany's largest cities, after Munich and ahead of Cologne and Berlin. In 2005, more than 18 million people visited concerts, exhibitions, theatres, cinemas, museums, and cultural events, and 8,552 taxable companies (average size: 3.16 employees) were engaged in the culture sector, which includes music, performing arts, and literature. The creative industries represent almost one-fifth of all companies in Hamburg. Hamburg has entered the European Green Capital Award scheme, and was awarded the title of European Green Capital for 2011.

=== Theatres ===
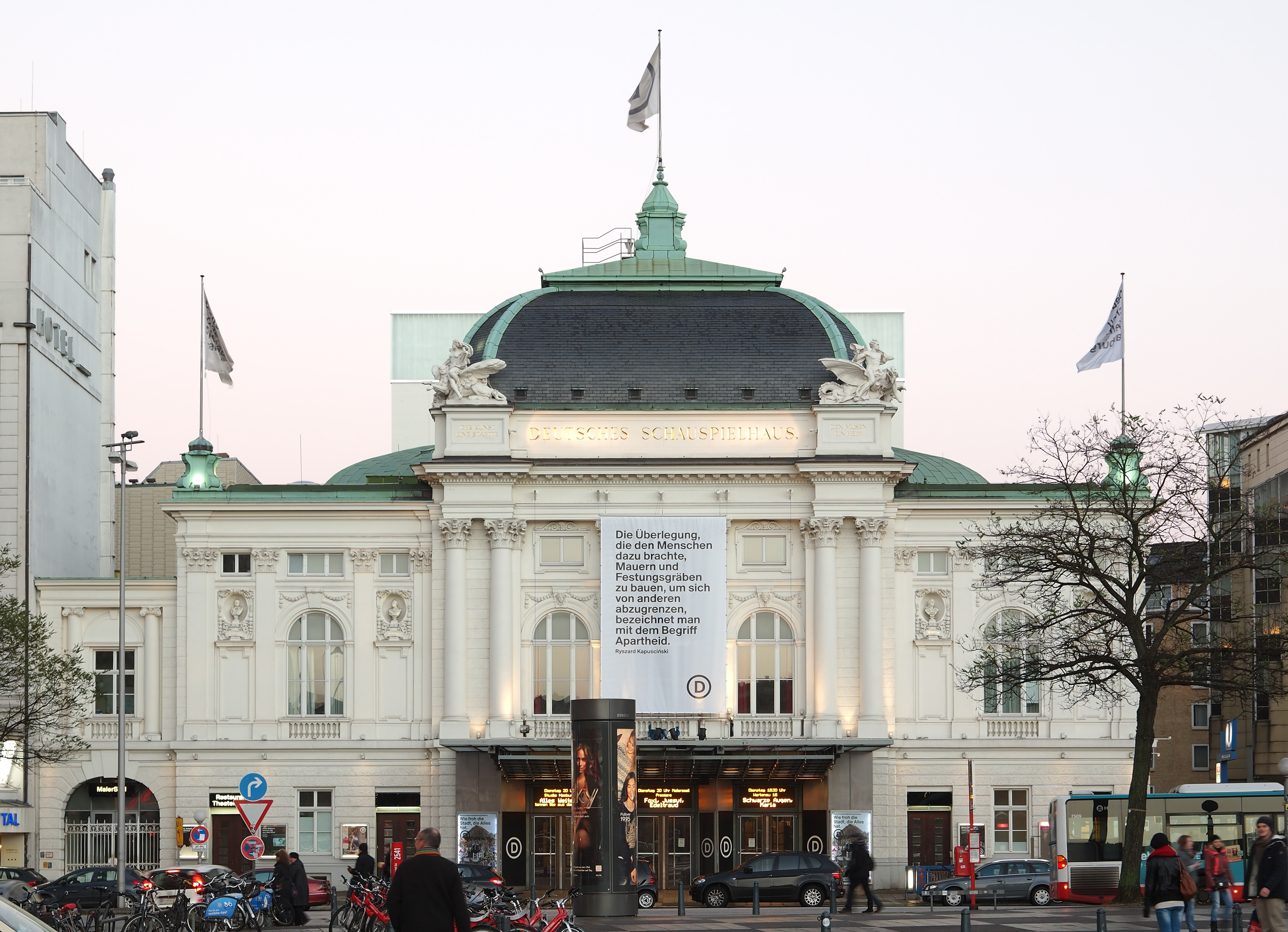
The Deutsches Schauspielhaus in the St. Georg quarter

Theatres in the city include the state-owned Deutsches Schauspielhaus, the Thalia Theatre, Ohnsorg Theatre, "Schmidts Tivoli", and the Kampnagel.

The English Theatre of Hamburg, near the U3 station Mundsburg, was founded in 1976 and is the oldest professional English-language theatre in Germany, with exclusively English-speaking actors in its company.

=== Museums ===
Hamburg has several large museums and galleries showing classical and contemporary art, such as the Kunsthalle Hamburg with its contemporary art gallery (Galerie der Gegenwart), the Museum für Kunst und Gewerbe (Museum of Art and Design), and the Deichtorhallen (with the House of Photography and Hall of Contemporary Art). The Internationales Maritimes Museum Hamburg opened in the HafenCity quarter in 2008. There are various specialised museums in Hamburg, such as the Archäologisches Museum Hamburg (Hamburg Archaeological Museum) in the Harburg borough, the Hamburg Museum of Work (Museum der Arbeit), and several museums of local history, such as the Kiekeberg Open Air Museum (Freilichtmuseum am Kiekeberg) at Kiekeberg in the Harburg Hills, just outside of Hamburg, in Rosengarten. Two museum ships near St. Pauli Piers (Landungsbrücken) bear witness to the freight ship (Cap San Diego) and cargo sailing ship era (Rickmer Rickmers). In 2017 the Hamburg-built iron-hulled sailing ship Peking returned to the city and was installed in the German Port Museum in 2020. The world's largest model railway museum, Miniatur Wunderland, with 15.4 km (9.57 mi) total railway length, is also situated near St. Pauli Piers in a former warehouse.

BallinStadt, a memorial park and former emigration station, is dedicated to the millions of Europeans who emigrated to North and South America between 1850 and 1939. Visitors descending from those overseas emigrants may search for their ancestors at computer terminals.

=== Music ===
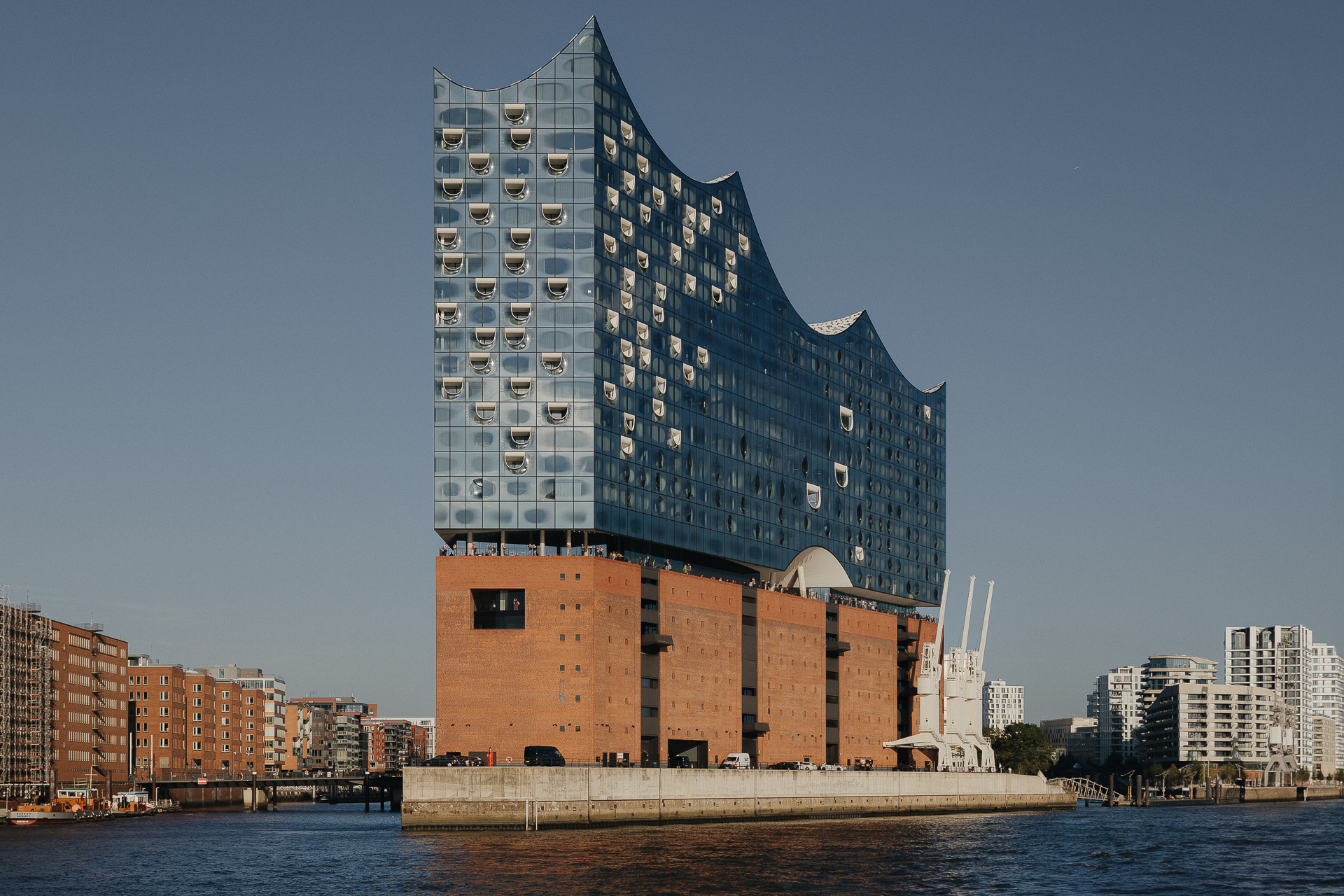
The 110-metre-high (361-foot) Elbphilharmonie concert hall

Hamburg State Opera is a leading opera company. Its orchestra is the Philharmoniker Hamburg. The city's other major orchestra is the NDR Elbphilharmonie Orchestra. The main concert venue is the new concert hall Elbphilharmonie. Before it was the Laeiszhalle, Musikhalle Hamburg. The Laeiszhalle also houses a third orchestra, the Hamburger Symphoniker. György Ligeti and Alfred Schnittke taught at the Hochschule für Musik und Theater Hamburg.

Hamburg is the birthplace of Johannes Brahms, who spent his formative early years in the city, and the birthplace and home of waltz composer Oscar Fetrás, who wrote the "Mondnacht auf der Alster" waltz.

Since the German premiere of Cats in 1986, there have always been musicals running, including The Phantom of the Opera, The Lion King, Dirty Dancing, and Dance of the Vampires. This density, the highest in Germany, is partly due to the major musical production company Stage Entertainment being based in the city.

In addition to musicals, opera houses, concert halls, and theatres, the cityscape is characterised by a large music scene. This includes, among other things, over 100 music venues, several annual festivals and over 50 event organisers based in Hamburg. Larger venues include the Barclaycard Arena, the Bahrenfeld harness racing track, and Hamburg City Park.

Hamburg was an important centre of rock music in the early 1960s. The Beatles lived and played in Hamburg from August 1960 to December 1962. They proved popular and gained local acclaim. Prior to the group's initial recording and widespread fame, Hamburg provided residency and performing venues for the band during the time they performed there. One of the venues they performed at was the Star-Club in St. Pauli.

Pop musicians from Hamburg include Udo Lindenberg, Deichkind, and Jan Delay. The singer Annett Louisan lives in the city.

An important meeting place for Hamburg musicians from the 1970s to the mid-1980s was the jazz pub Onkel Pö, which was originally founded in the Pöseldorf neighbourhood and later moved to Eppendorf. Many musicians who were counted as part of the "Hamburg scene" met here. In addition to Udo Lindenberg, these included Otto Waalkes, Hans Scheibner and groups such as Torfrock and Frumpy. One of the members of the band Frumpy was the Hamburg-born singer and composer Inga Rumpf.

Hamburg is the origin of the "Hamburger Schule", a term used for alternative music bands like Tocotronic, Blumfeld, Tomte or Kante. The meeting point of the Hamburg School was long considered to be the Golden Pudel Club in Altona's old town, near the Fischmarkt. Alongside clubs such as the Pal, the Moondoo or the Waagenbau, today the Pudel is a central location of the Hamburg electro scene. Artists of this scene include the DJ duo Moonbootica, Mladen Solomun, and Helena Hauff.

Hamburg is also home to many music labels, music distributors and publishers. These include Warner Music, Kontor Records, PIAS, Edel SE & Co. KGaA, Believe Digital, and Indigo. The high proportion of independent labels in the city, which include Audiolith, Dial Records, Grand Hotel van Cleef, among others, is striking. Before its closure, the label L'Âge d'or also belonged to these.

In addition, Hamburg has a considerable alternative and punk scene, which gathers around the Rote Flora, a squatted former theatre located in the Sternschanze.

The city was a major centre for heavy metal music in the 1980s. Helloween, Gamma Ray, Running Wild, and Grave Digger started in Hamburg. The influences of these and other bands from the area helped establish the subgenre of power metal. The industrial rock band KMFDM was also formed in Hamburg, initially as a performance art project.

In the late 1990s, Hamburg was considered one of the strongholds of the German hip-hop scene. Bands like Beginner shaped the city's hip-hop style and made it a serious location for the hip-hop scene through songs like "Hamburg City Blues". In addition to Beginner, German hip-hop acts from Hamburg include Fünf Sterne Deluxe, Samy Deluxe, Fettes Brot, and 187 Strassenbande.

Hamburg has a highly active psychedelic trance community, historically housing record labels such as Spirit Zone.

=== Festivals and regular events ===
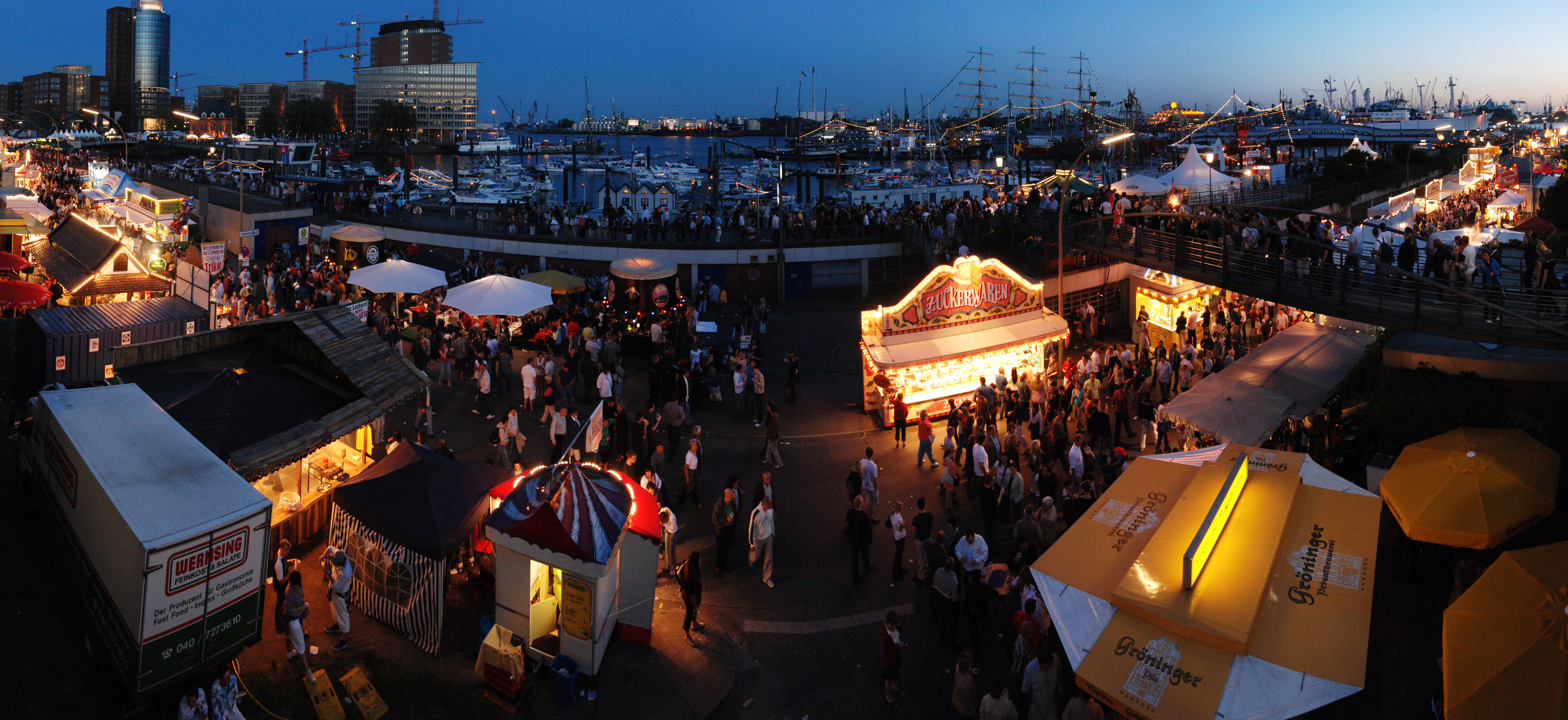
Annual Hafengeburtstag (Port Anniversary)

Hamburg is noted for several festivals and regular events. Some of them are street festivals, such as the LGBT pride Hamburg Pride festival or the Alster fair (German: Alstervergnügen), held at the Binnenalster. The Hamburger DOM is northern Germany's biggest funfair, held three times a year. Hafengeburtstag is a funfair to honour the birthday of the port of Hamburg with a party and a ship parade. The annual biker's service in Saint Michael's Church attracts tens of thousands of bikers. Christmas markets in December are held at the Hamburg Rathaus square, among other places. The long night of museums (German: Lange Nacht der Museen) offers one entrance fee for about 40 museums until midnight. The sixth Festival of Cultures was held in September 2008, celebrating multi-cultural life. The Filmfest Hamburg — a film festival originating from the 1950s Film Days (German: Film Tage) — presents a wide range of films. The Hamburg Messe und Congress offers a venue for trade shows, such hanseboot, an international boat show, or Du und deine Welt, a large consumer products show. Regular sports events—some open to pro and amateur participants—are the cycling competition EuroEyes Cyclassics, the Hamburg Marathon, the biggest marathon in Germany after Berlin, the tennis tournament Hamburg Masters, and equestrian events like the Deutsches Derby.

Hamburg is also known for its music and festival culture. For example, the Reeperbahn alone has between 25 and 30 million visitors every year. In addition, there are over a million visitors to the annual festivals and major music events. Hamburg's festivals include the Elbjazz Festival, which takes place 2 days a year (usually on the Whitsun weekend) in Hamburg's harbour and HafenCity.

For contemporary and experimental music, the "blurred edges" festival usually follows in May at various venues within Hamburg. In mid-August, the MS Dockville music and arts festival has run annually since 2007 in the Wilhelmsburg district. This is followed at the end of September by the Reeperbahn Festival, which has been running since 2006. As Europe's largest club festival, it offers several hundred program points around the Reeperbahn in Hamburg over four days and is one of the most important meeting places for the music industry worldwide. In November, the Überjazz Festival, which aims to expand the stylistic boundaries of the concept of jazz, starts every year at Kampnagel.

=== Cuisine ===
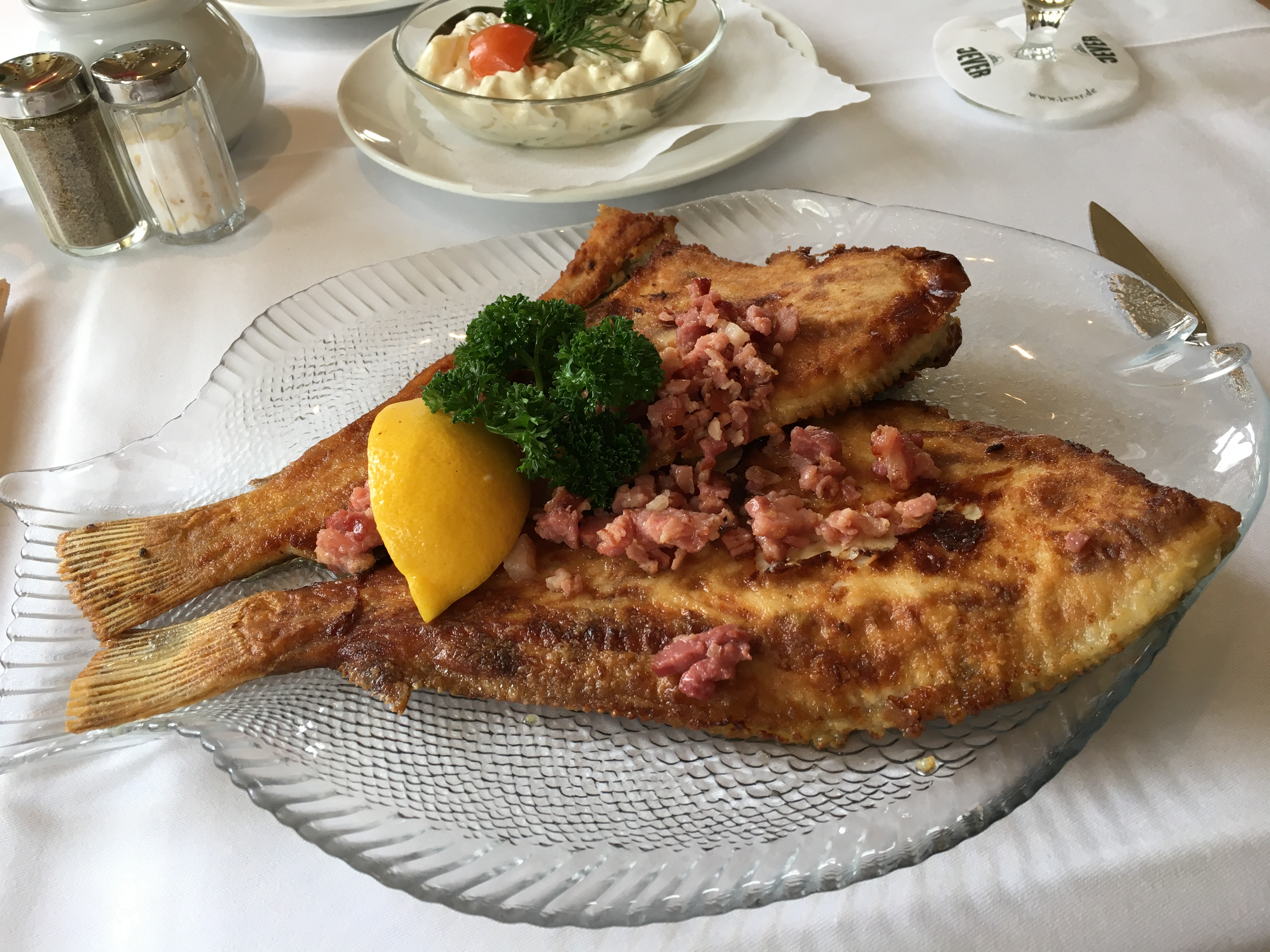
Fried plaice, Finkenwerder style

Original Hamburg dishes include Birnen, Bohnen und Speck (green beans cooked with pears and bacon). Aalsuppe (Hamburgisch Oolsupp) is often mistaken to be German for "eel soup" (Aal/Ool translated 'eel'), but the name probably comes from the Low Saxon allns [aˑlns], meaning "all", "everything and the kitchen sink", not necessarily eel. Today eel is often included to meet the expectations of unsuspecting diners. There is Bratkartoffeln (pan-fried potato slices), Finkenwerder Scholle (Low Saxon Finkwarder Scholl, pan-fried plaice), Pannfisch (pan-fried fish with mustard sauce), Rote Grütze (Low Saxon Rode Grütt, related to Danish rødgrød, a type of summer pudding made mostly from berries and usually served with cream, like Danish rødgrød med fløde), and Labskaus (a mixture of corned beef, mashed potatoes, and beetroot, a cousin of the Norwegian lapskaus and Liverpool's lobscouse, all offshoots off an old-time one-pot meal that used to be the main component of the common sailor's humdrum diet on the high seas).

Alsterwasser (in reference to the city's river, the Alster) is the local name for a type of shandy, a concoction of equal parts of beer and carbonated lemonade (Zitronenlimonade), the lemonade being added to the beer.

A regional dessert pastry called "Franzbrötchen" is similar in preparation to a croissant, but includes a cinnamon and sugar filling, often with raisins or brown sugar streusel. Ordinary bread rolls tend to be oval-shaped and of the French bread variety. The local name is Schrippe (scored lengthways) for the oval kind and, for the round kind, Rundstück ("round piece" rather than mainstream German Brötchen, diminutive form of Brot "bread"), a relative of Denmark's rundstykke. The cuisines of Hamburg and Denmark, especially of Copenhagen, have a lot in common. This also includes a predilection for open-faced sandwiches of all sorts, especially topped with cold-smoked or pickled fish.

The American hamburger may have developed from Hamburg's Frikadeller: a pan-fried patty (usually larger and thicker than its American counterpart) made from a mixture of ground beef, soaked stale bread, egg, chopped onion, salt, and pepper, usually served with potatoes and vegetables like any other piece of meat, not usually on a bun. The Oxford Dictionary defined a Hamburger steak in 1802: a sometimes-smoked and -salted piece of meat, that, according to some sources, came from Hamburg to America. The name and food, "hamburger", has entered all English-speaking countries, and derivative words in non-English speaking countries.

There are restaurants which offer most of these dishes, especially in the HafenCity.

=== Main sights ===
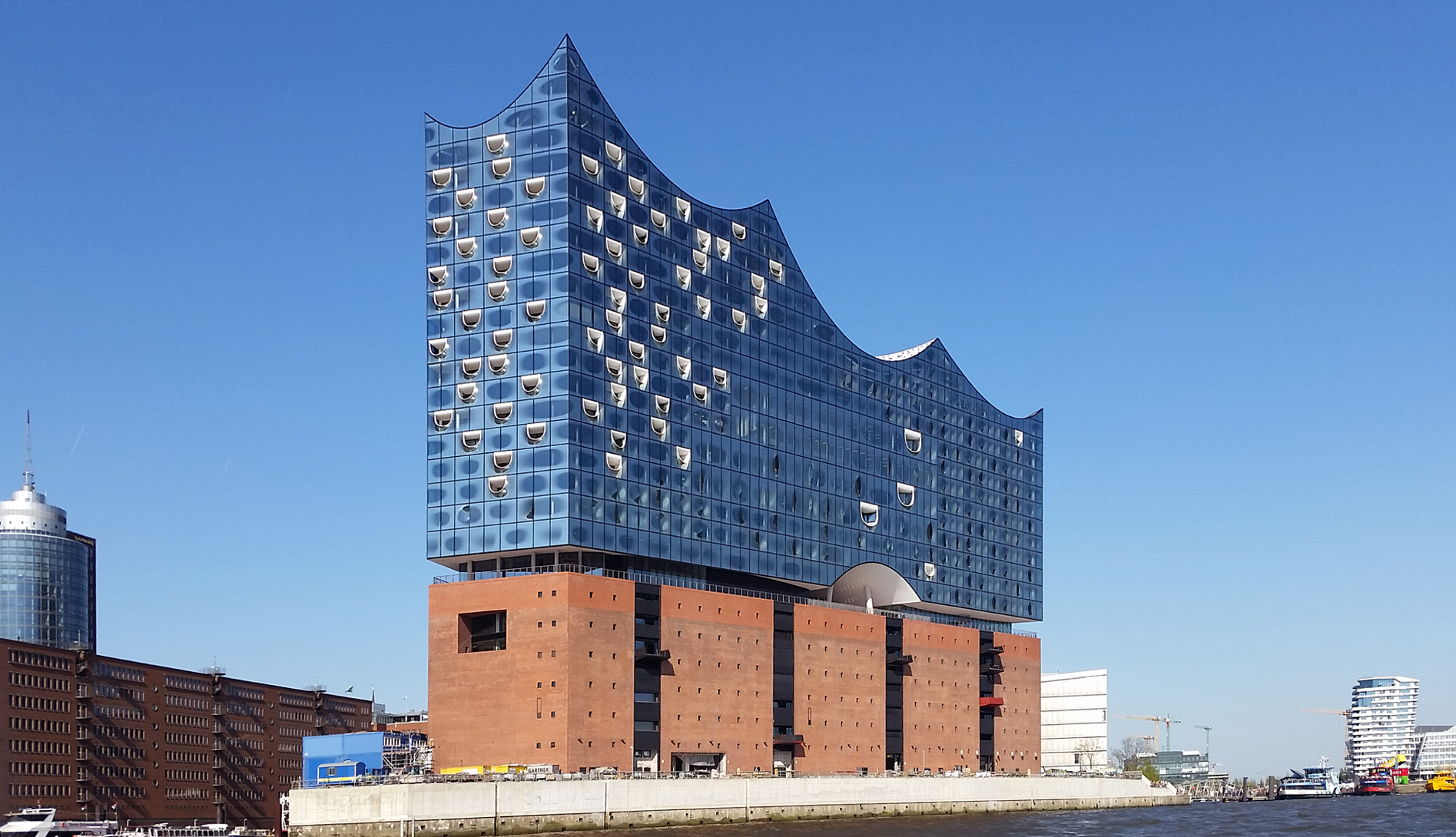
Elbphilharmonie ("Elphi")

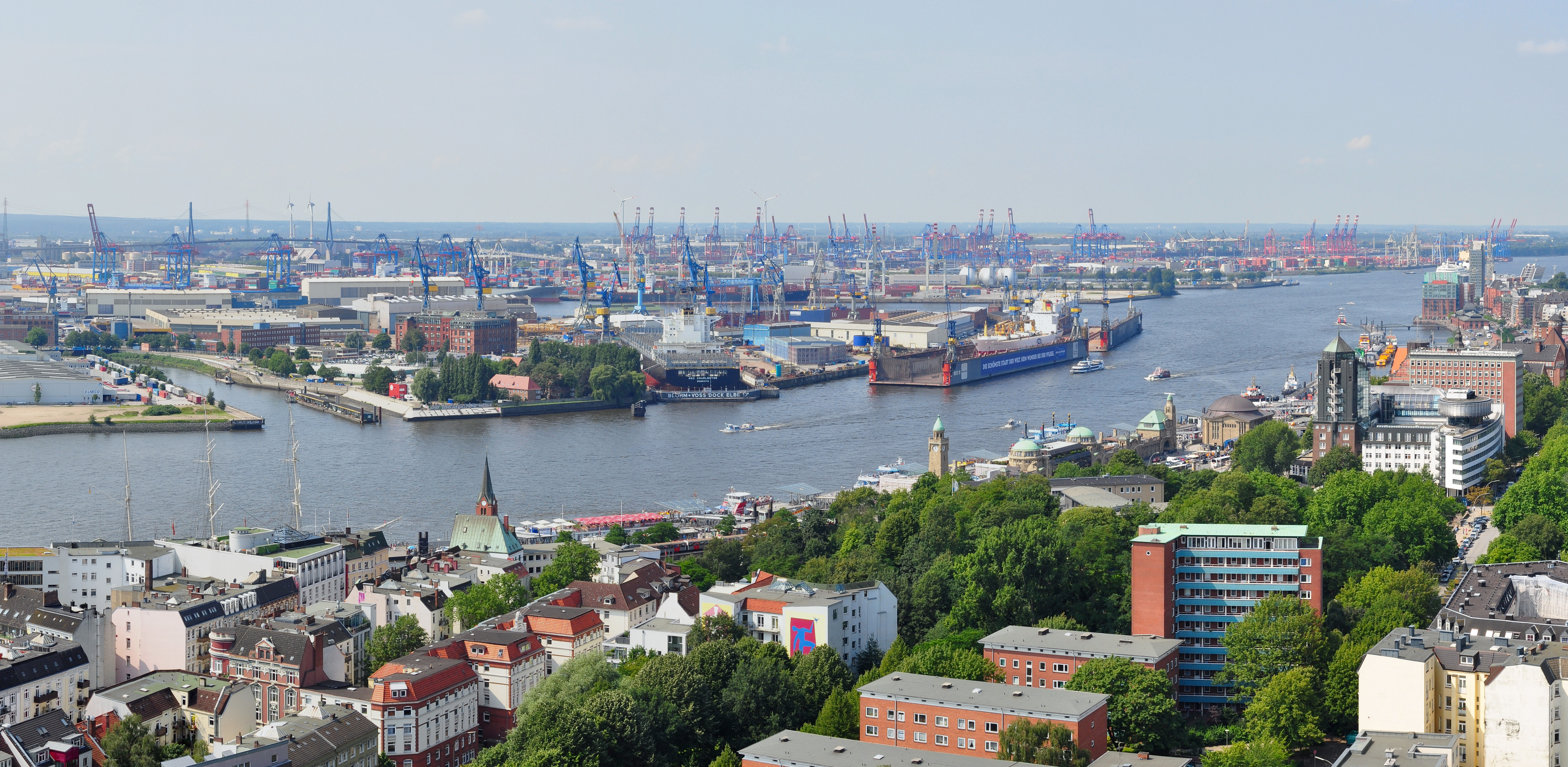
Port of Hamburg

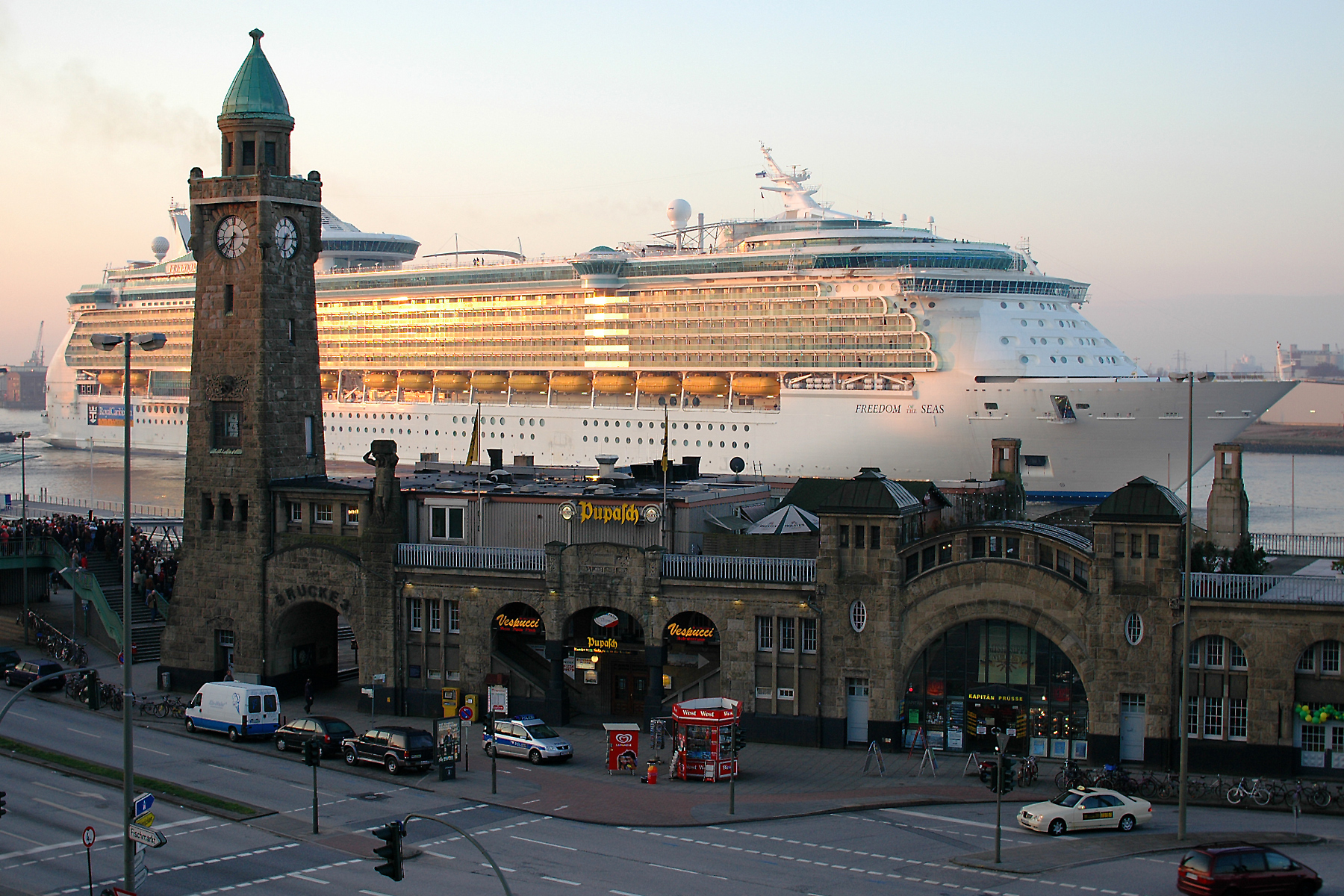
St. Pauli Piers and cruise ship

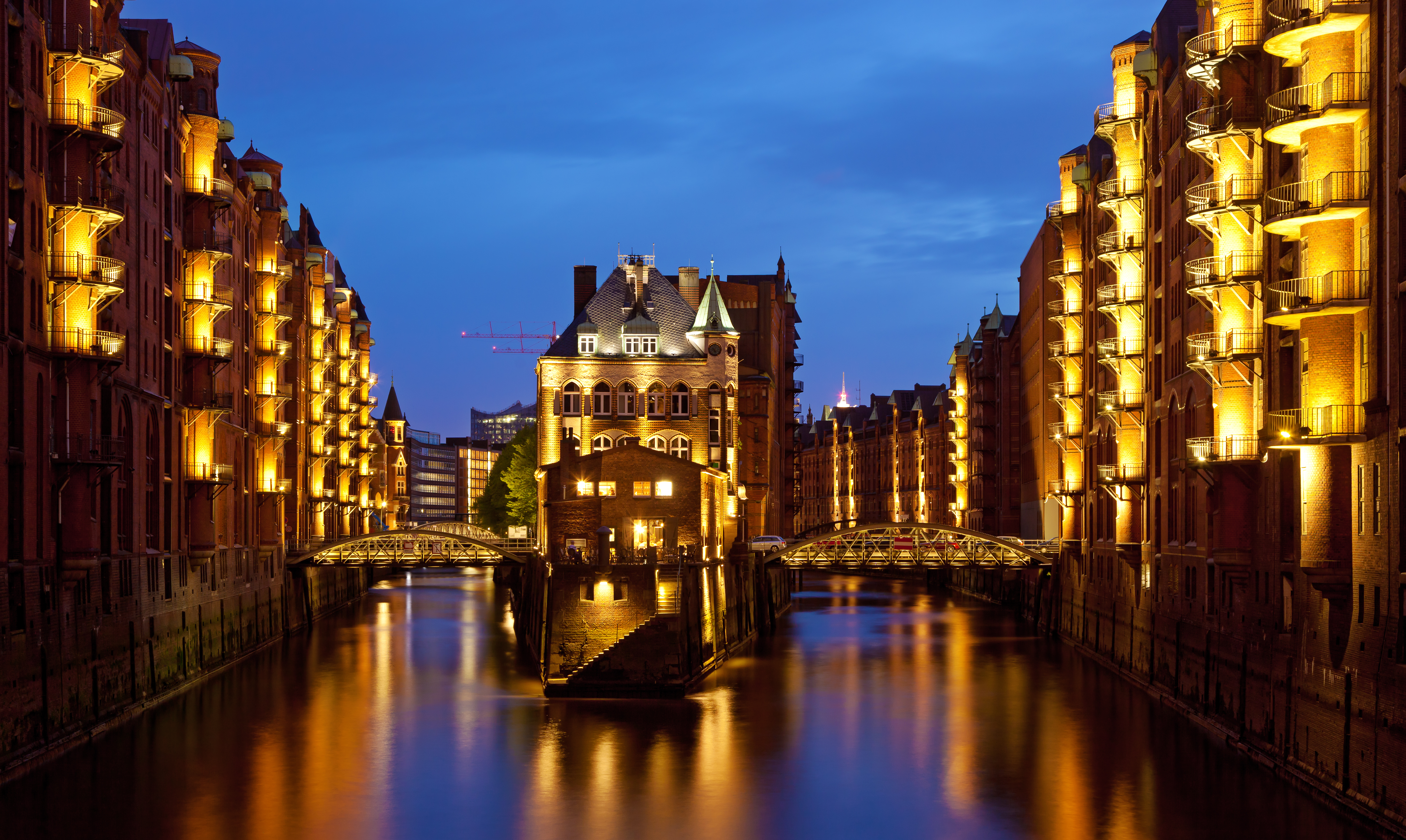
Speicherstadt (Warehouse district)

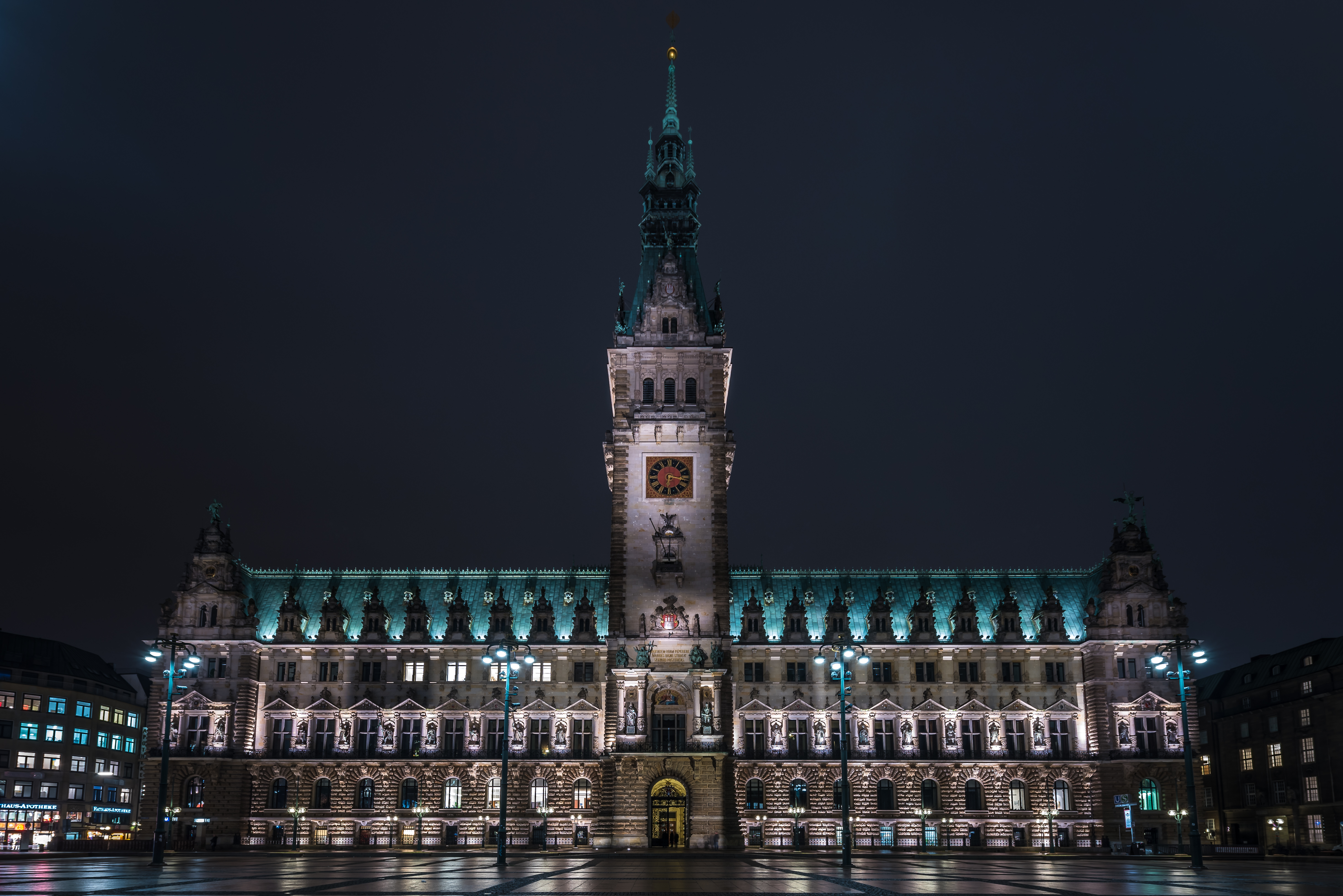
Hamburg City Hall

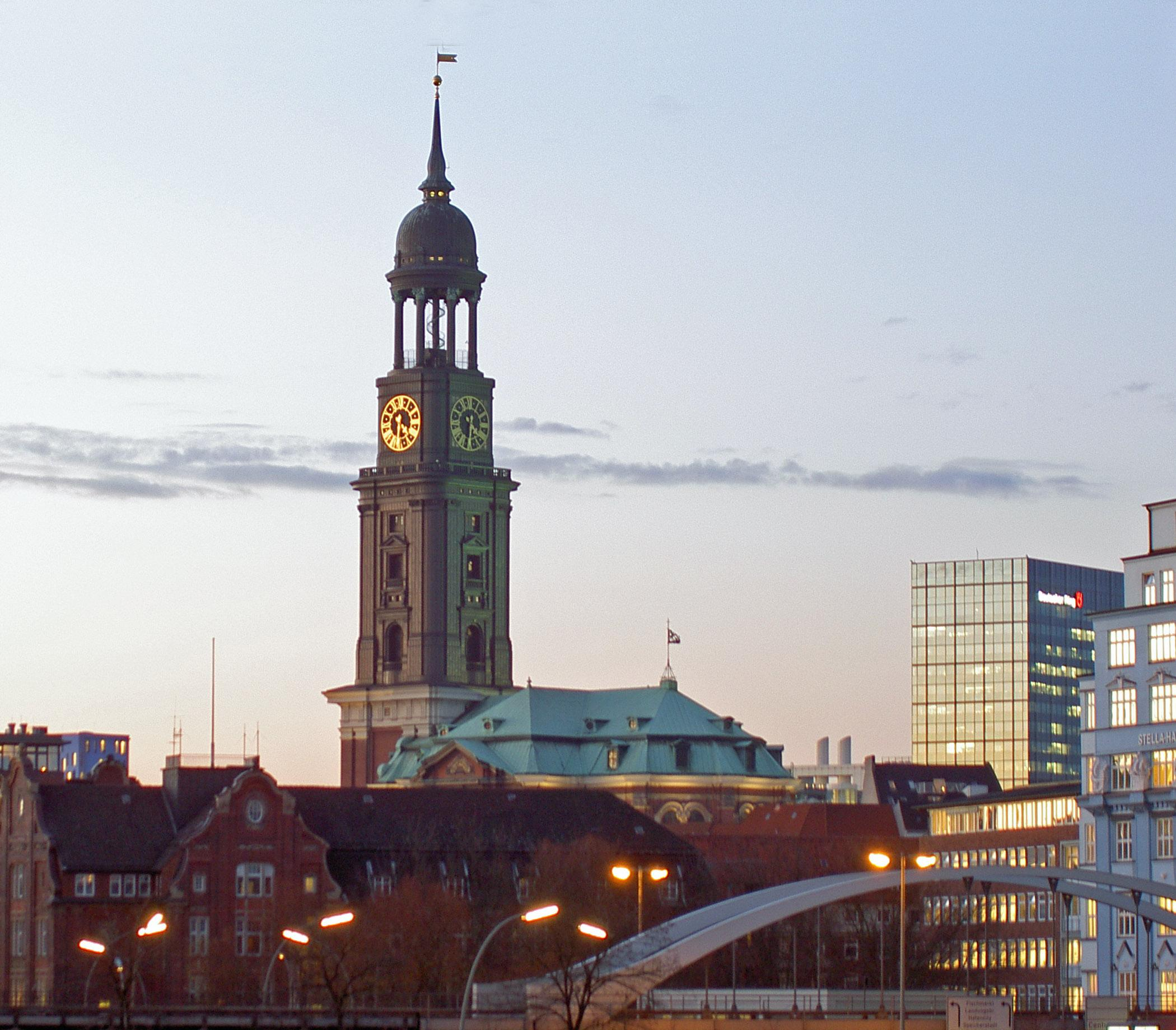
St. Michael's Church ("Michel")

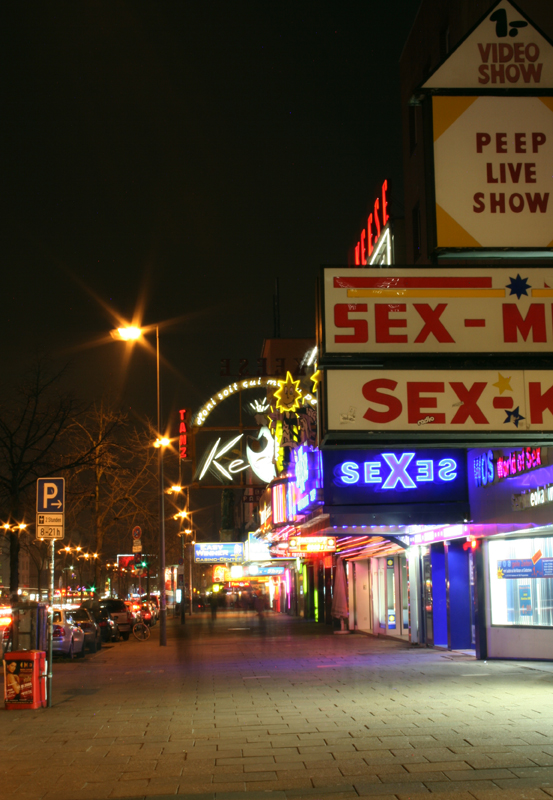
Reeperbahn, nightlife district of St. Pauli

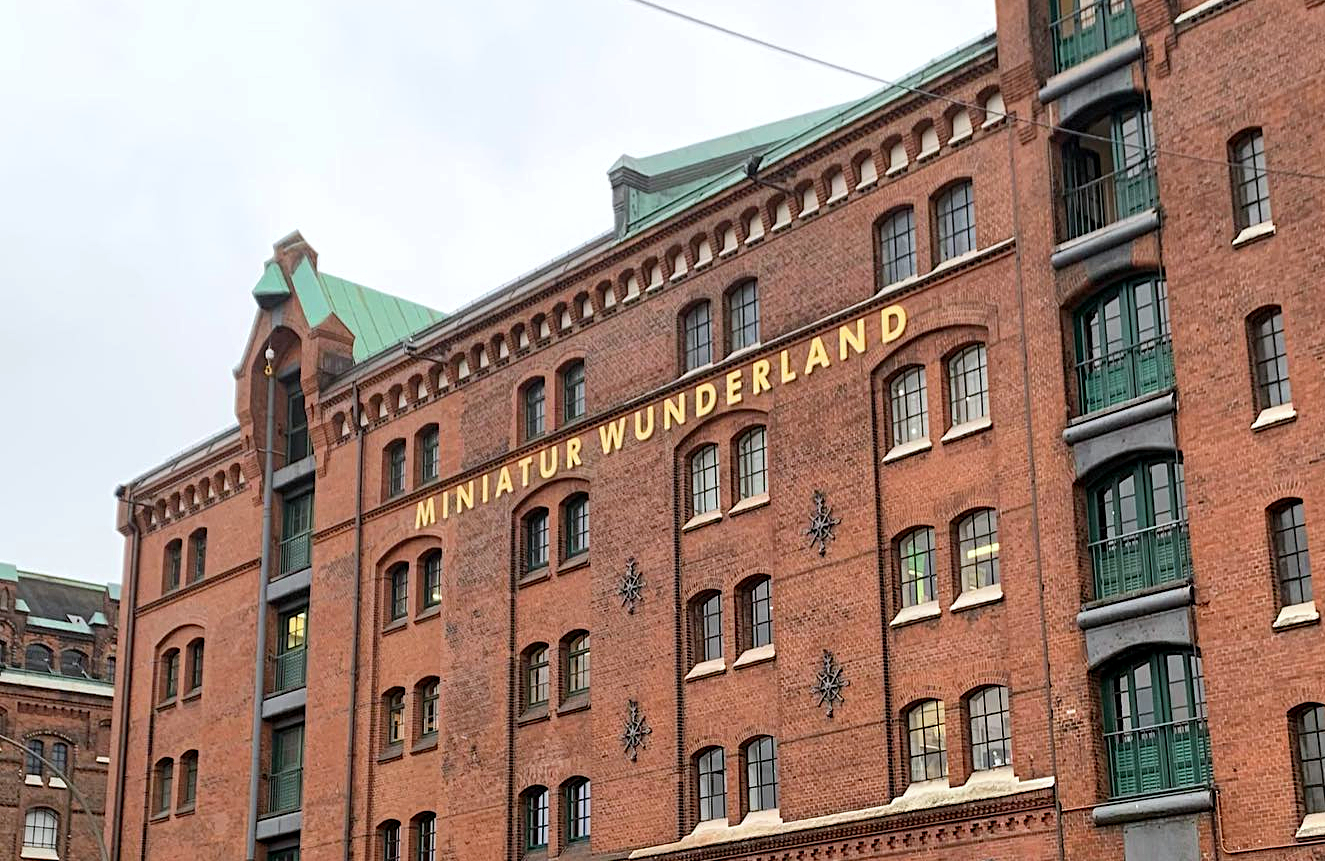
Miniatur Wunderland (Miniature Wonderland)

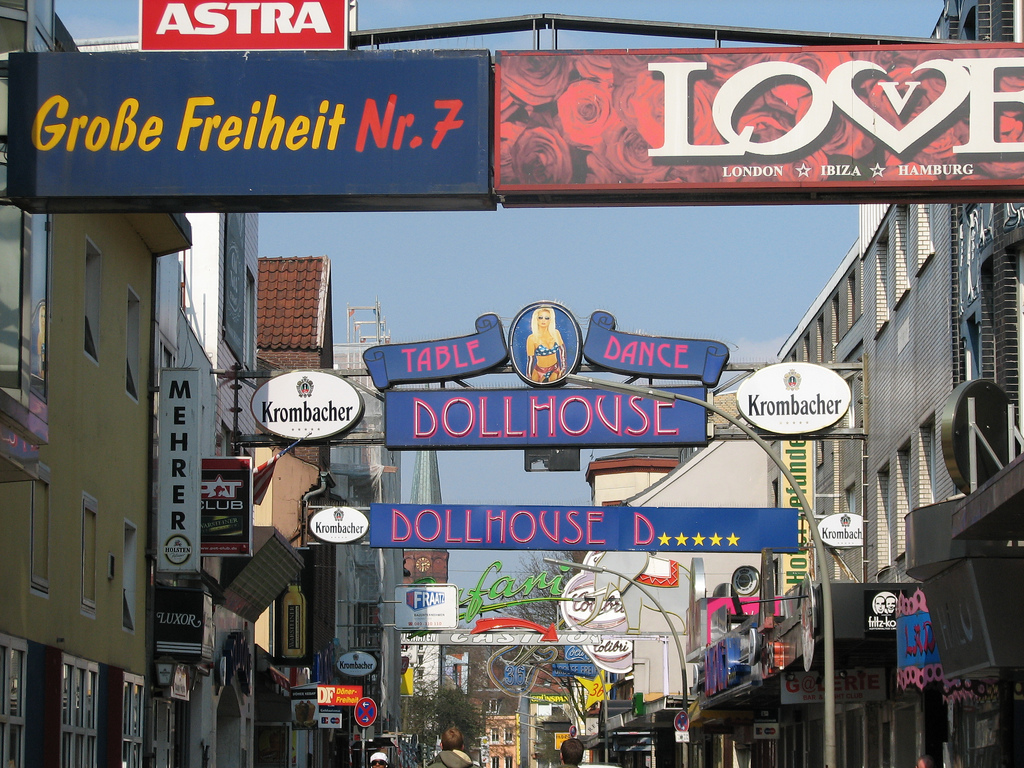
Große Freiheit ("Great Freedom")

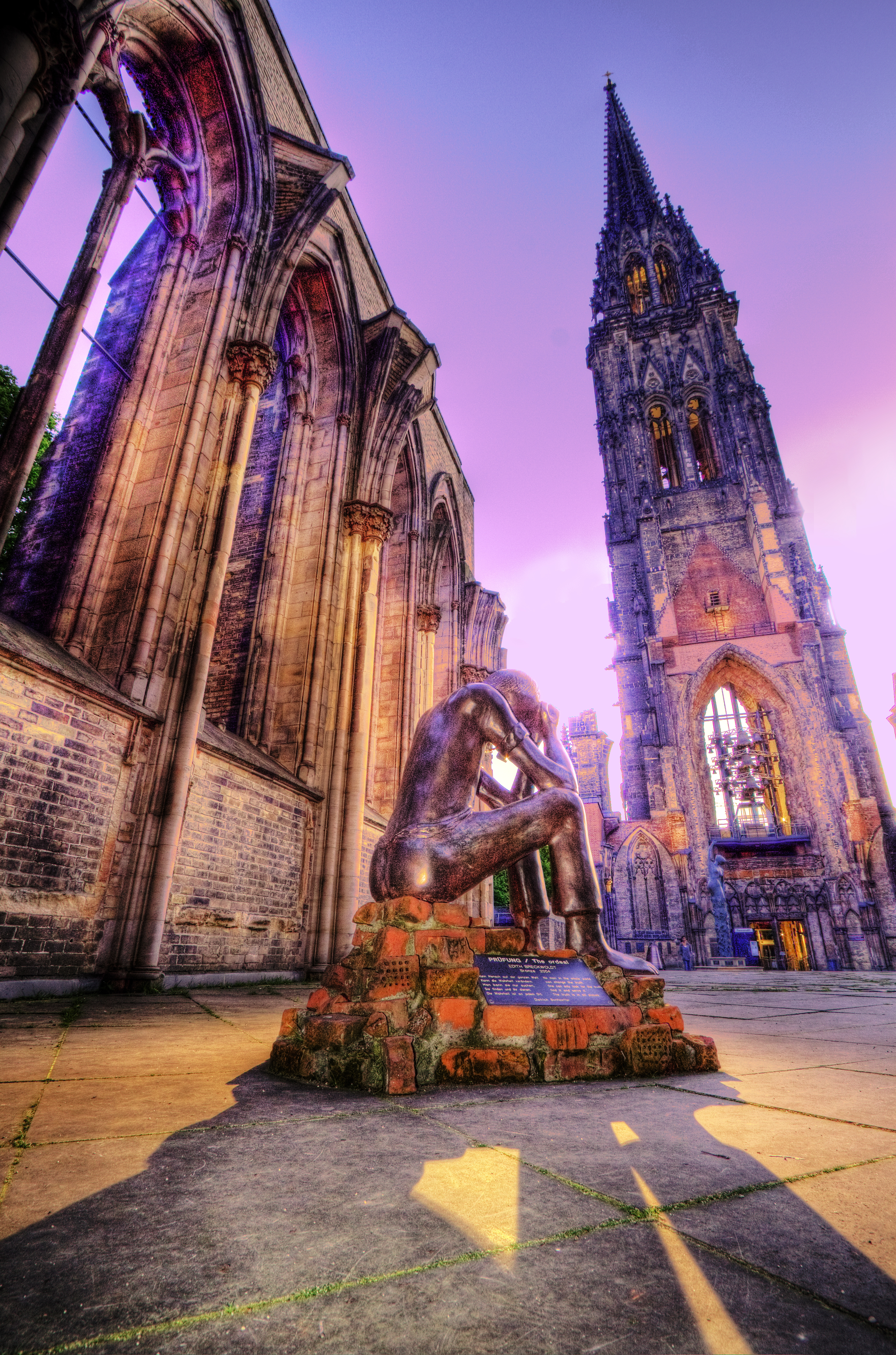
Nikolai Memorial

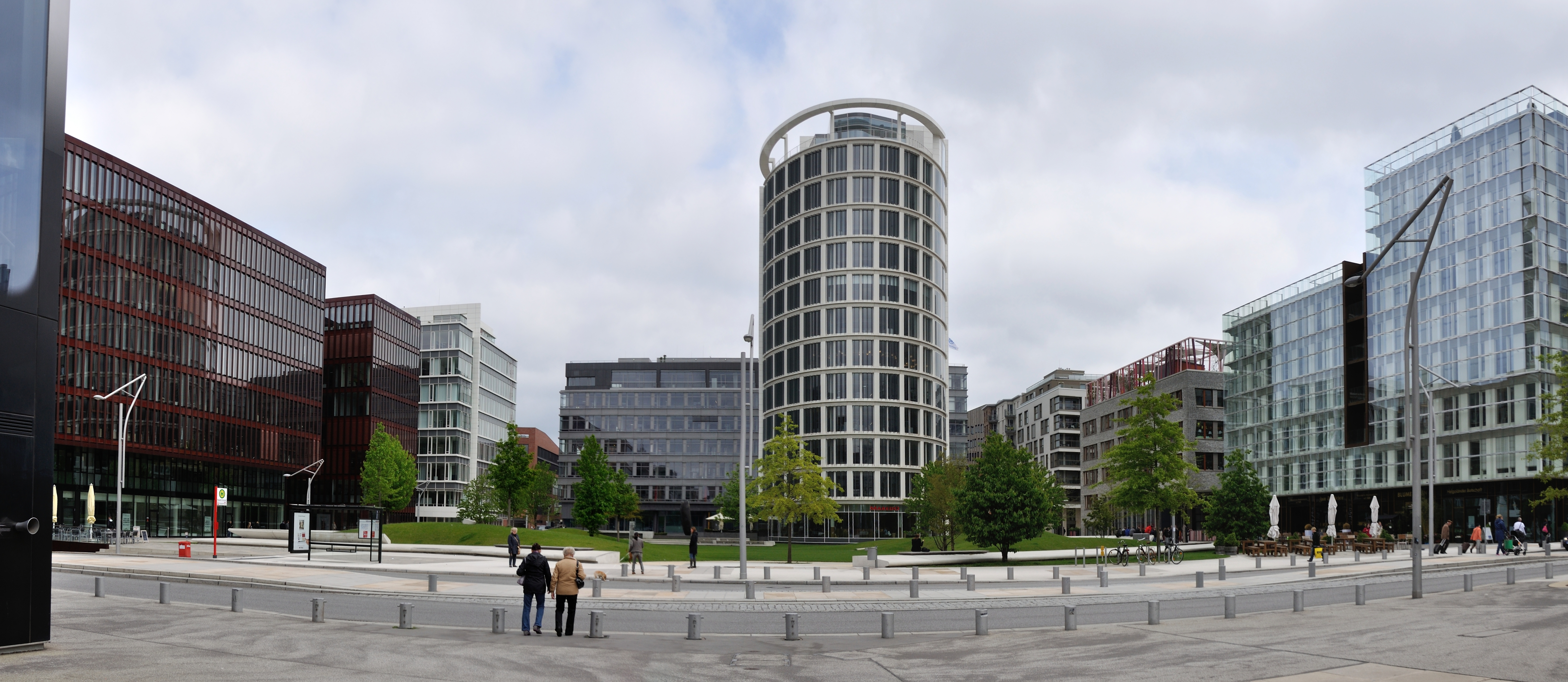
HafenCity

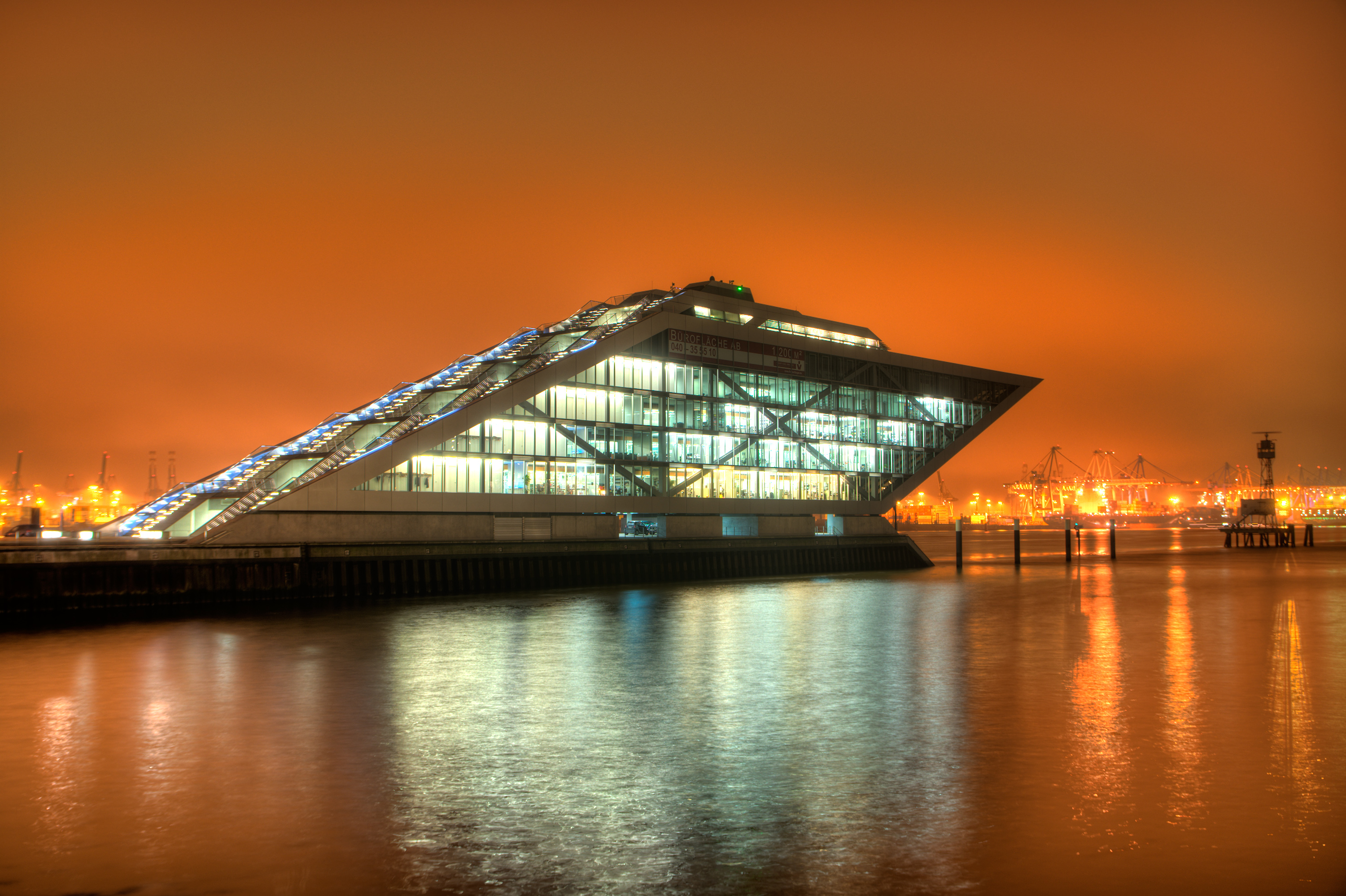
Dockland at night

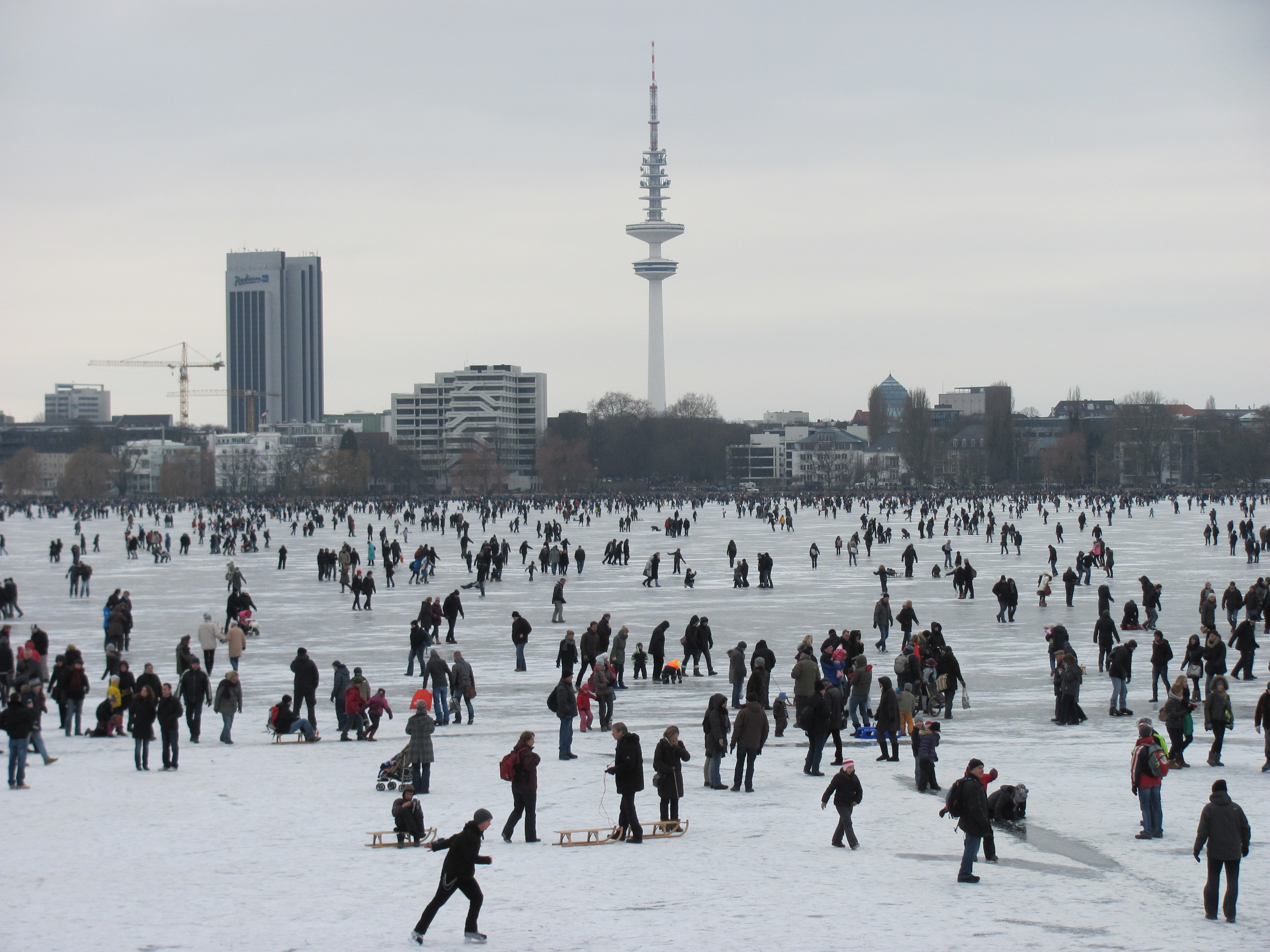
View over frozen Alster towards Radisson Hotel and Hertz-Turm

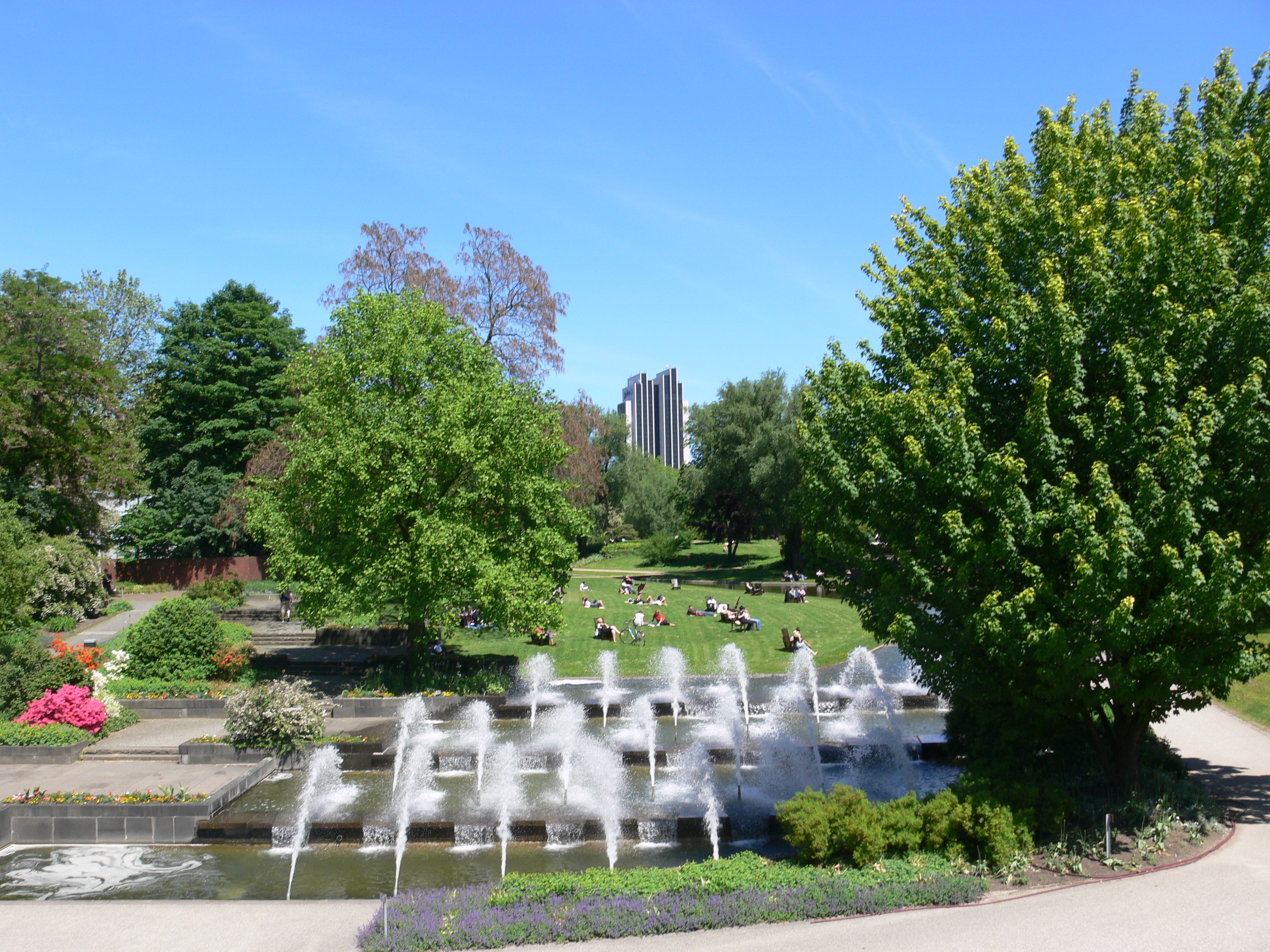
Planten un Blomen

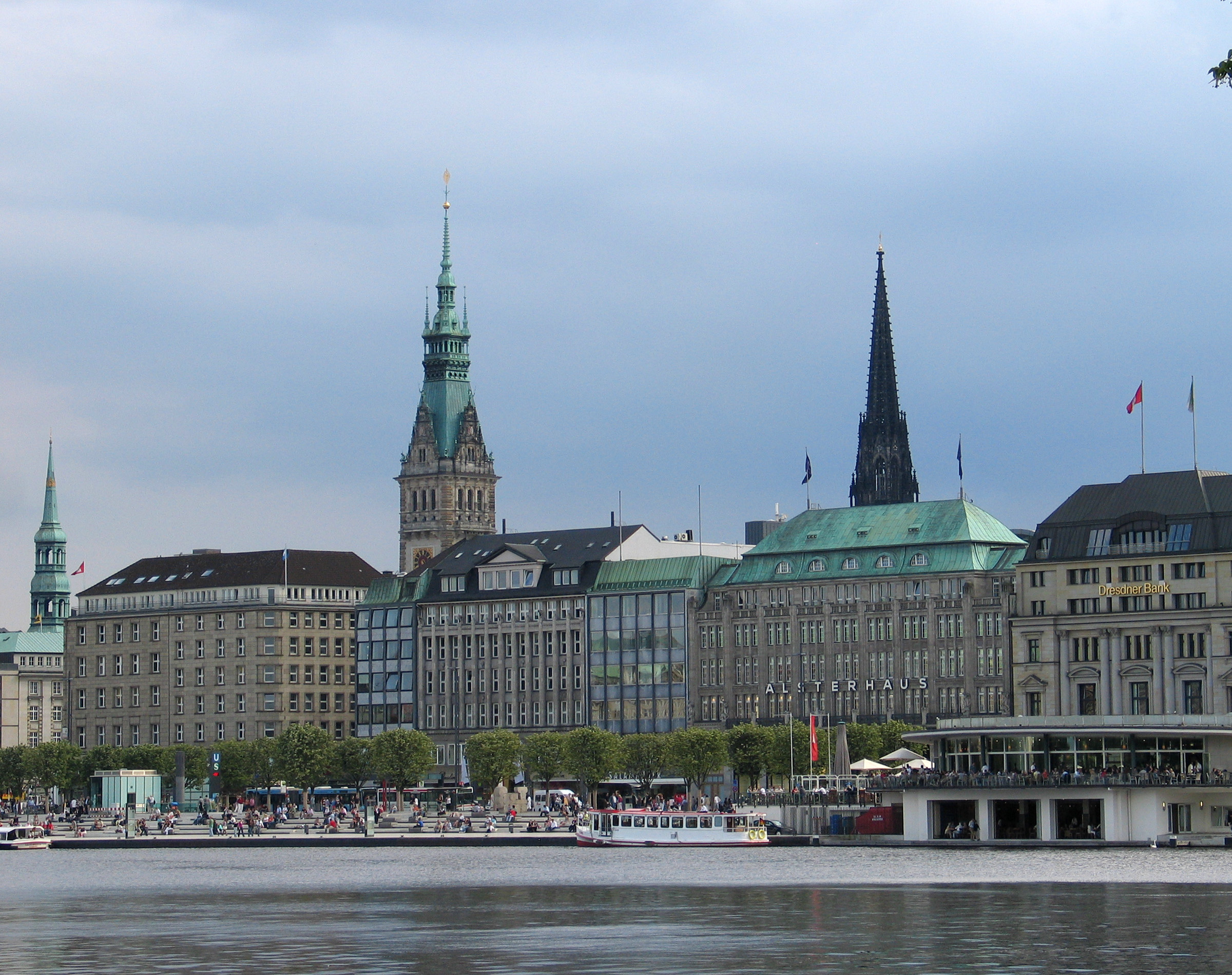
Jungfernstieg Boulevard

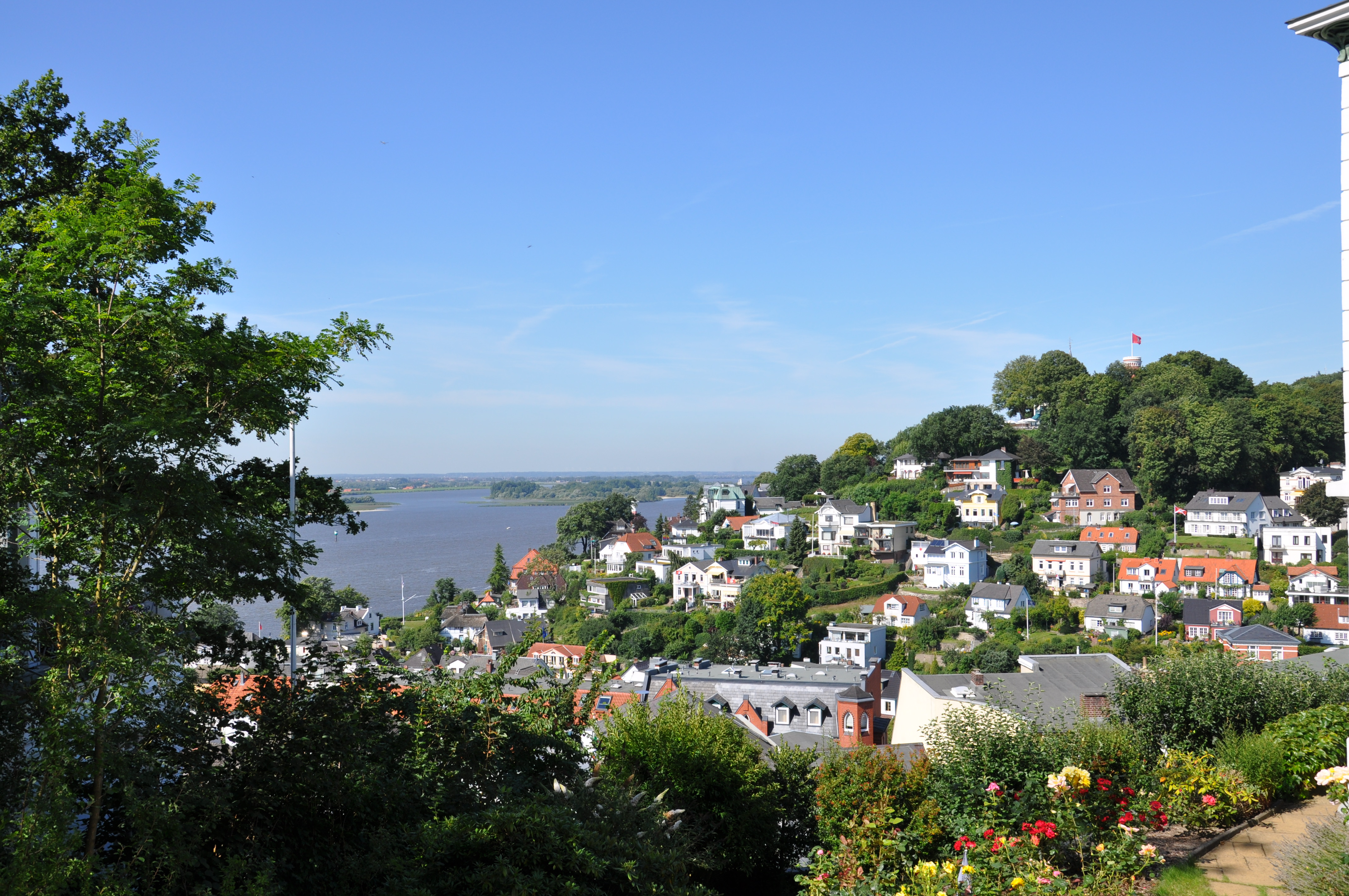
Hills and mansions in Blankenese

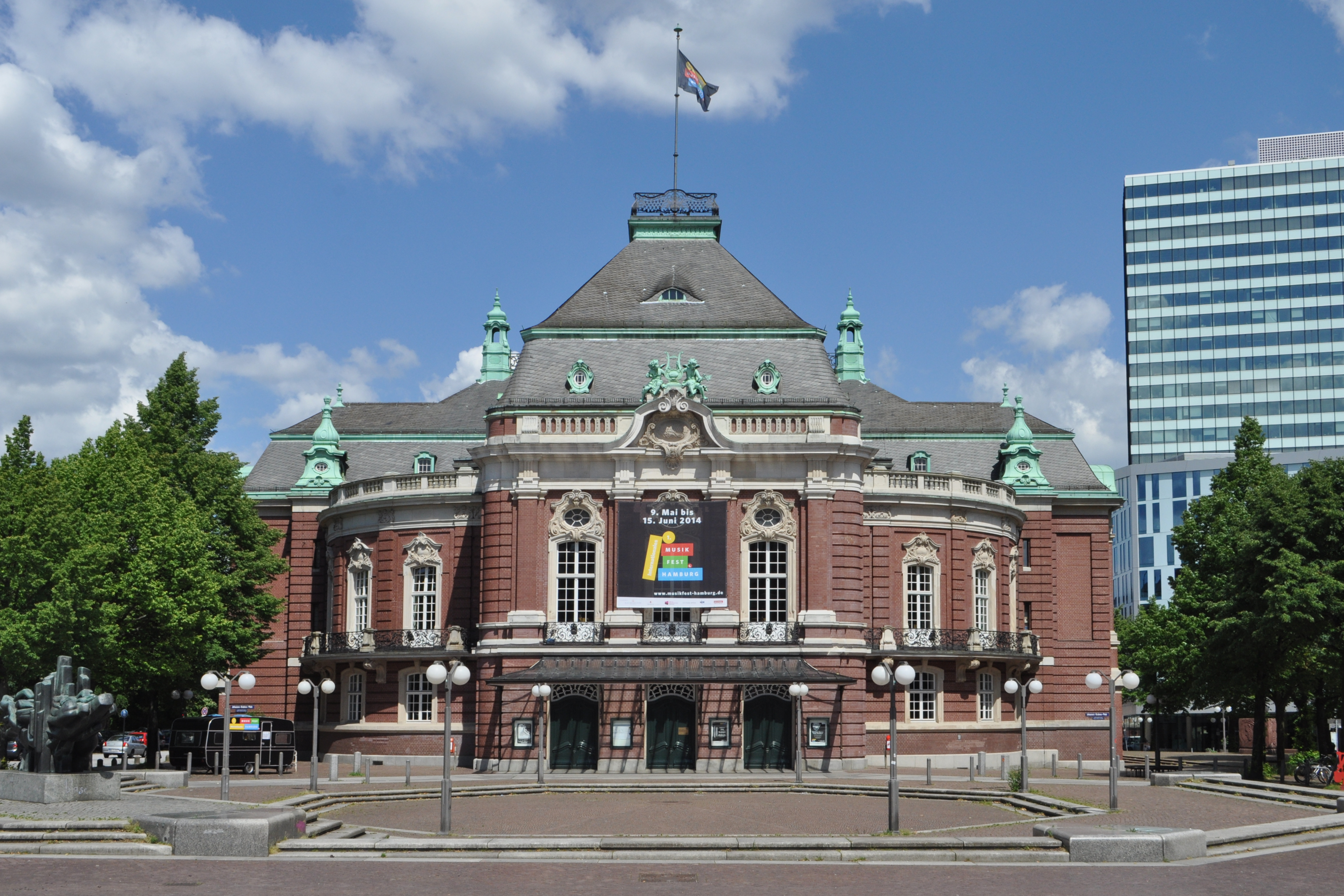
Laeiszhalle concert venue

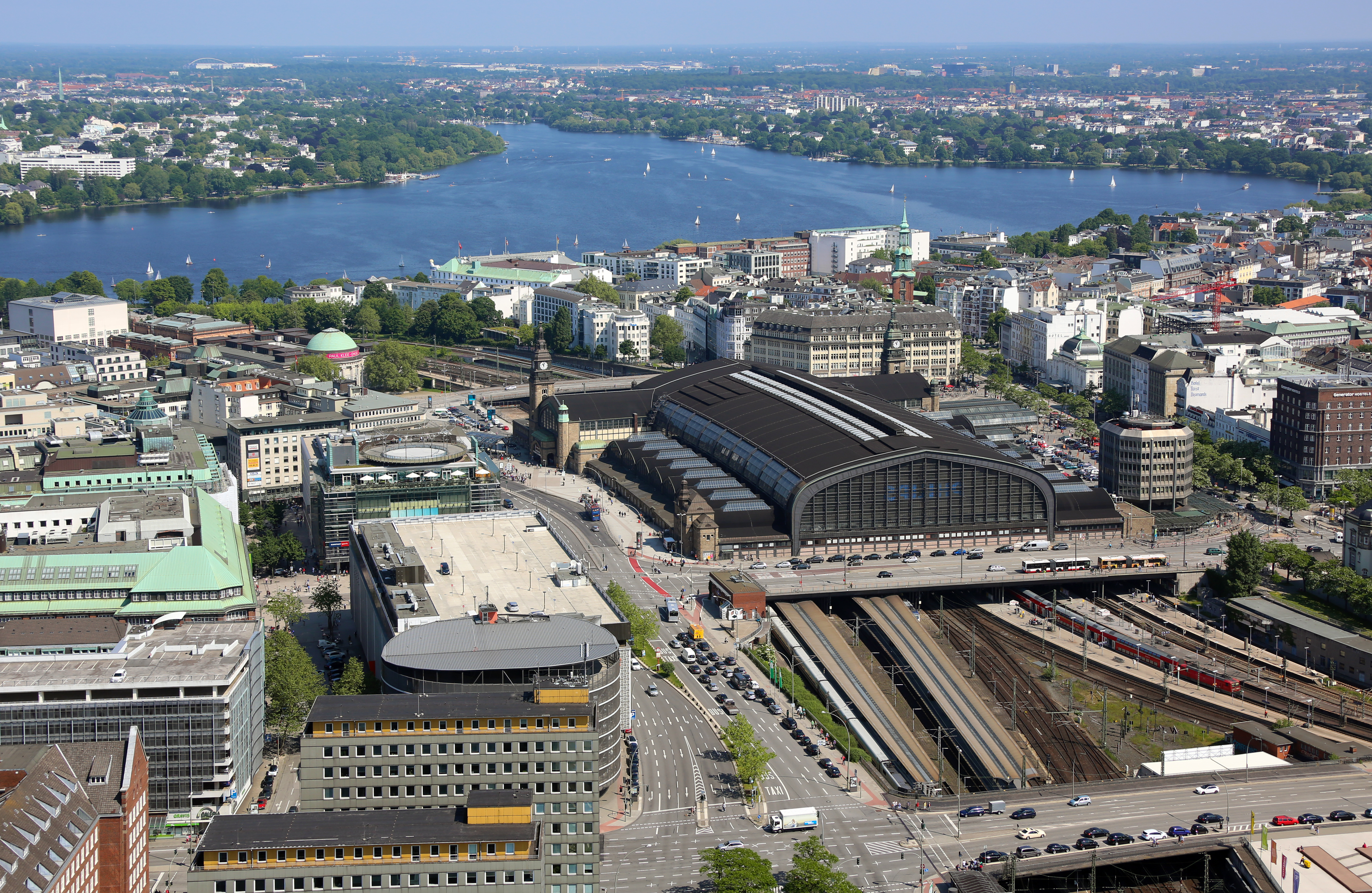
Hamburg Hauptbahnhof, the busiest railway station in Germany

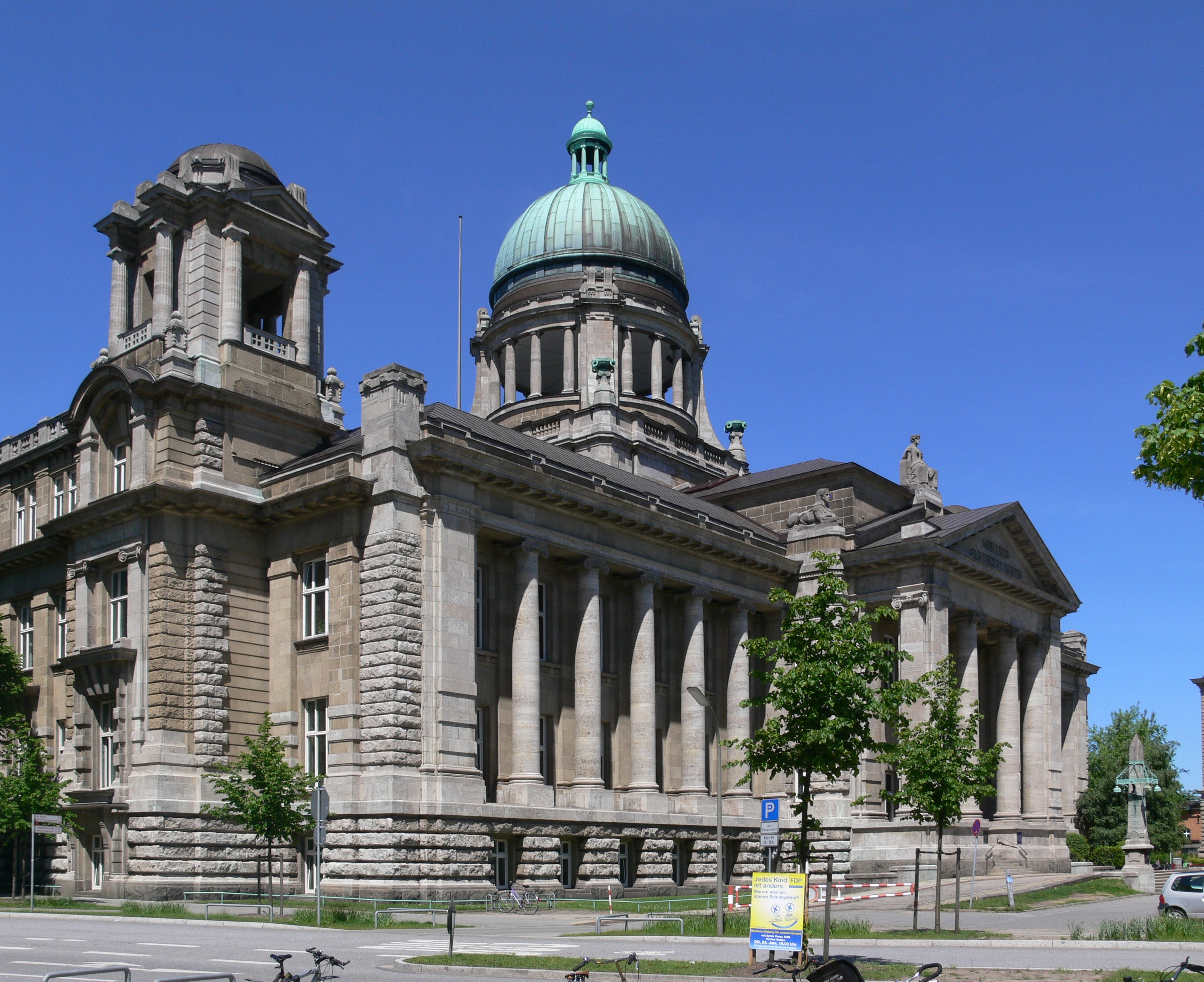
Hanseatisches Oberlandesgericht ("HansOLG"), upper court

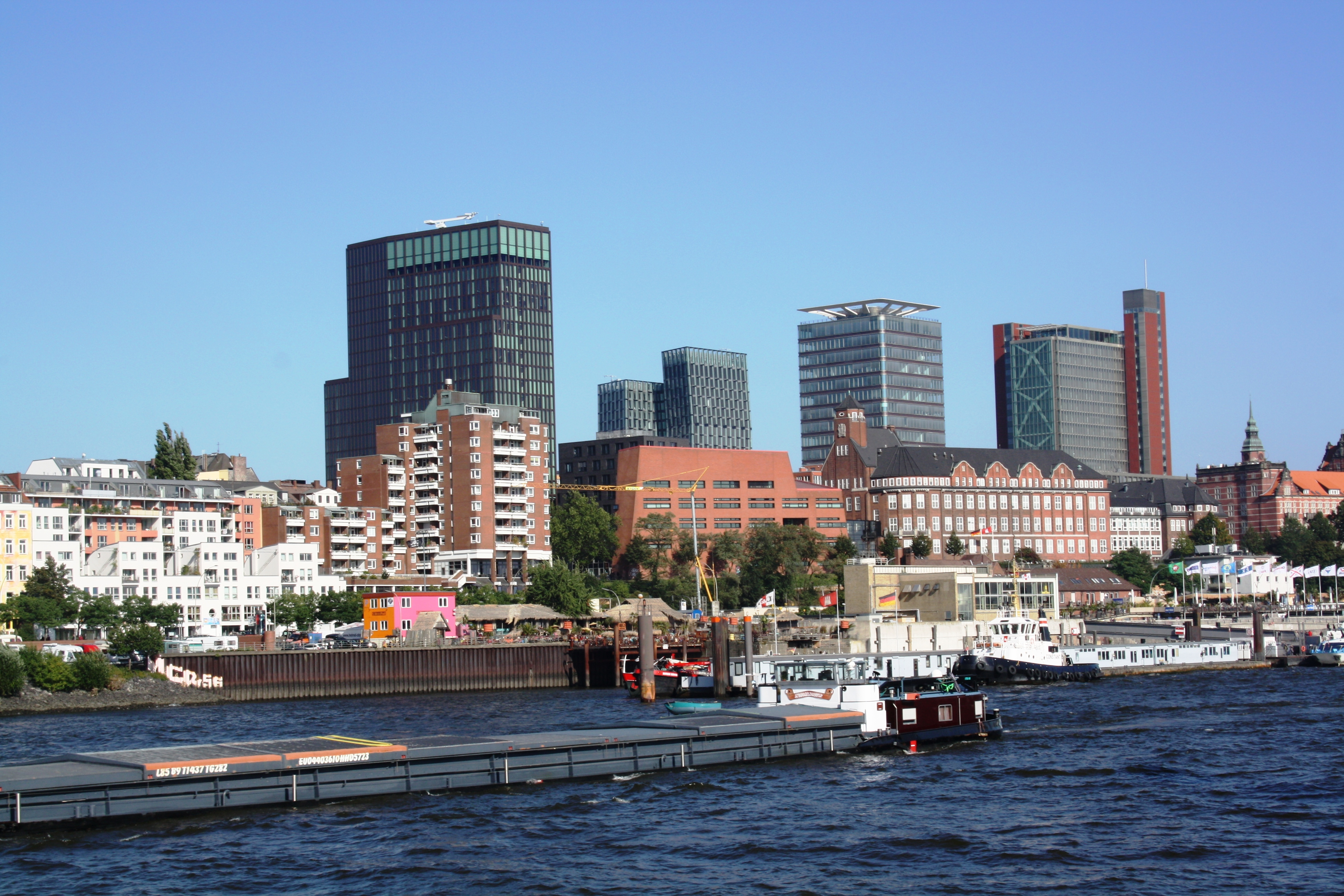
Highrises in St. Pauli (Hafenkrone)

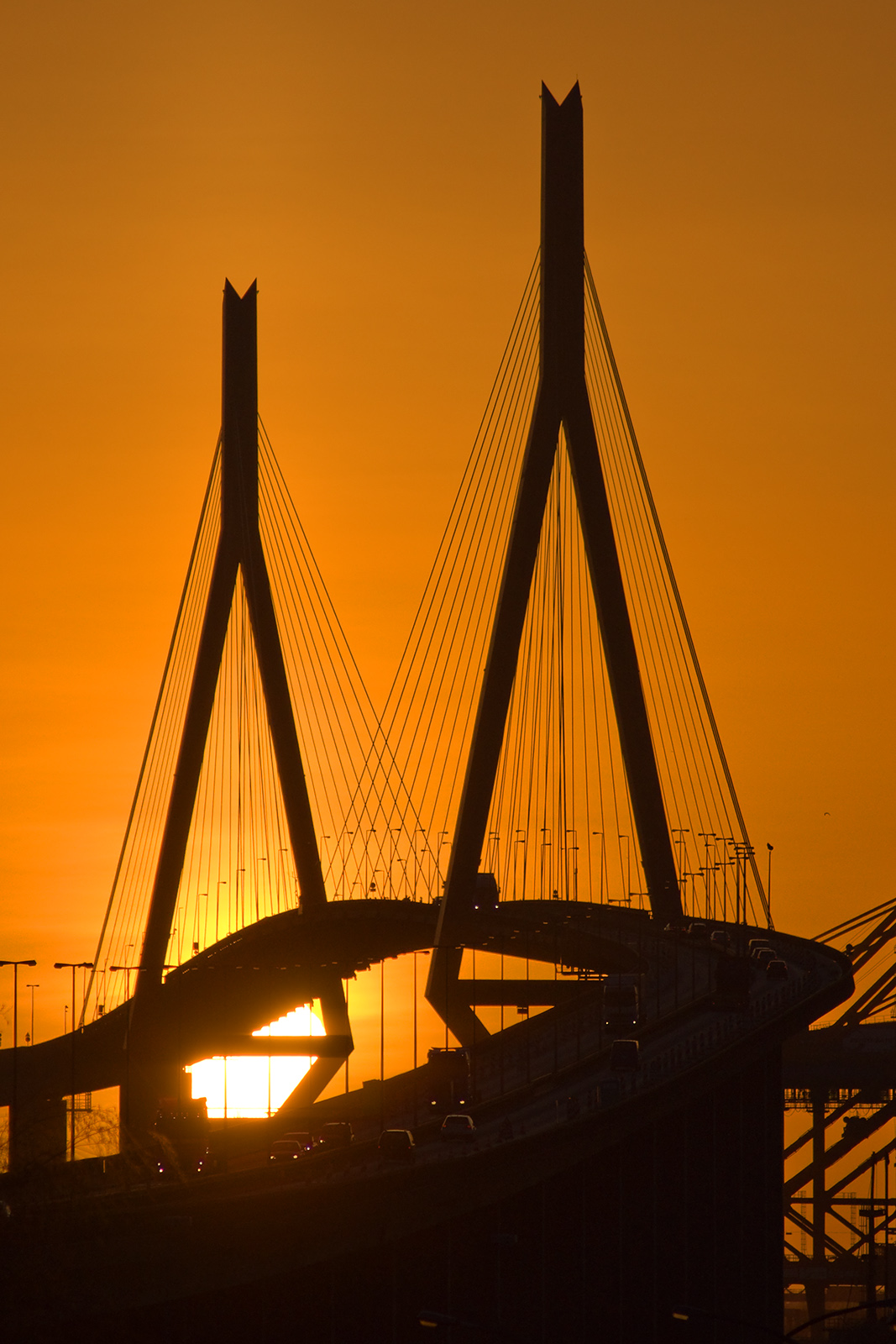
Köhlbrand Bridge

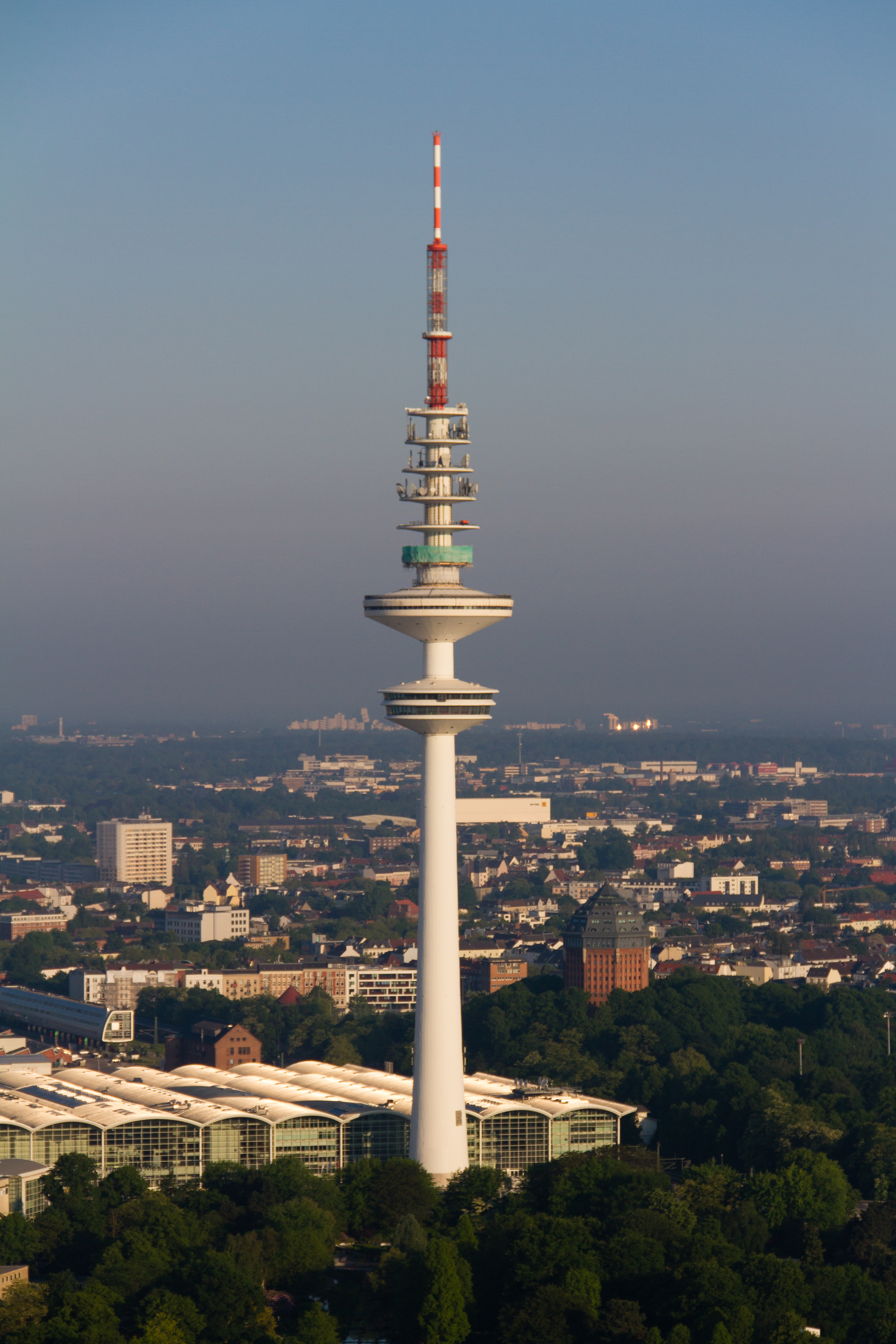
TV Tower

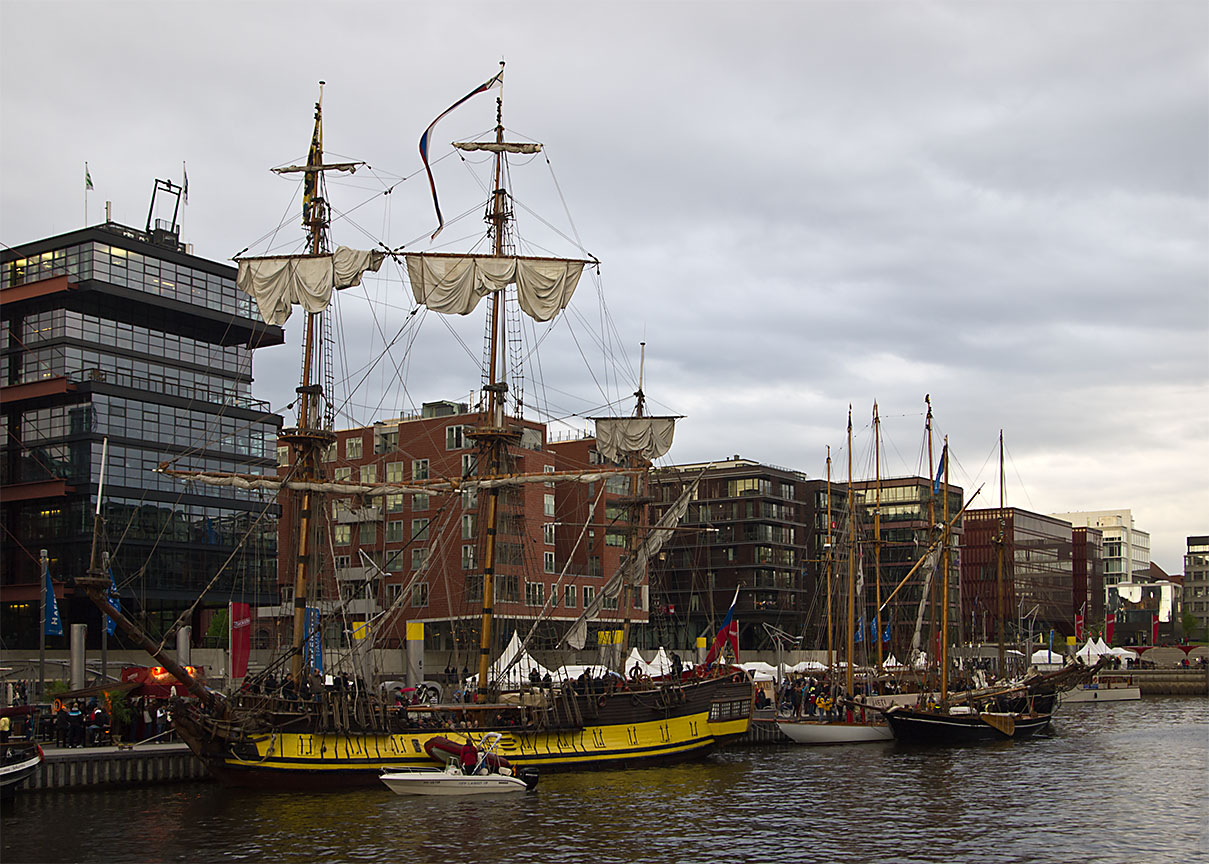
Traditional sailing ships at Sandtorkai in HafenCity

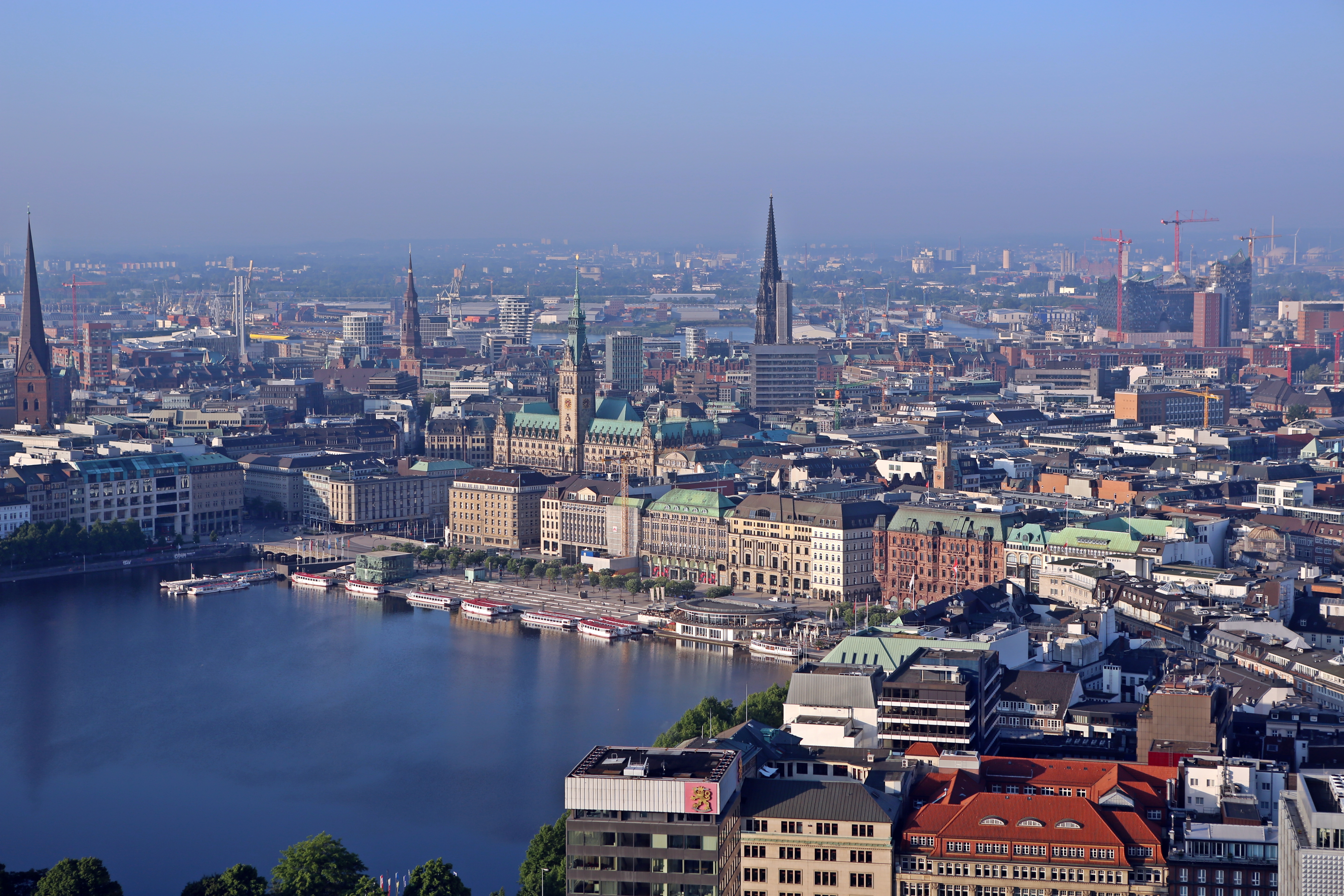
View over Hamburg and the Alster

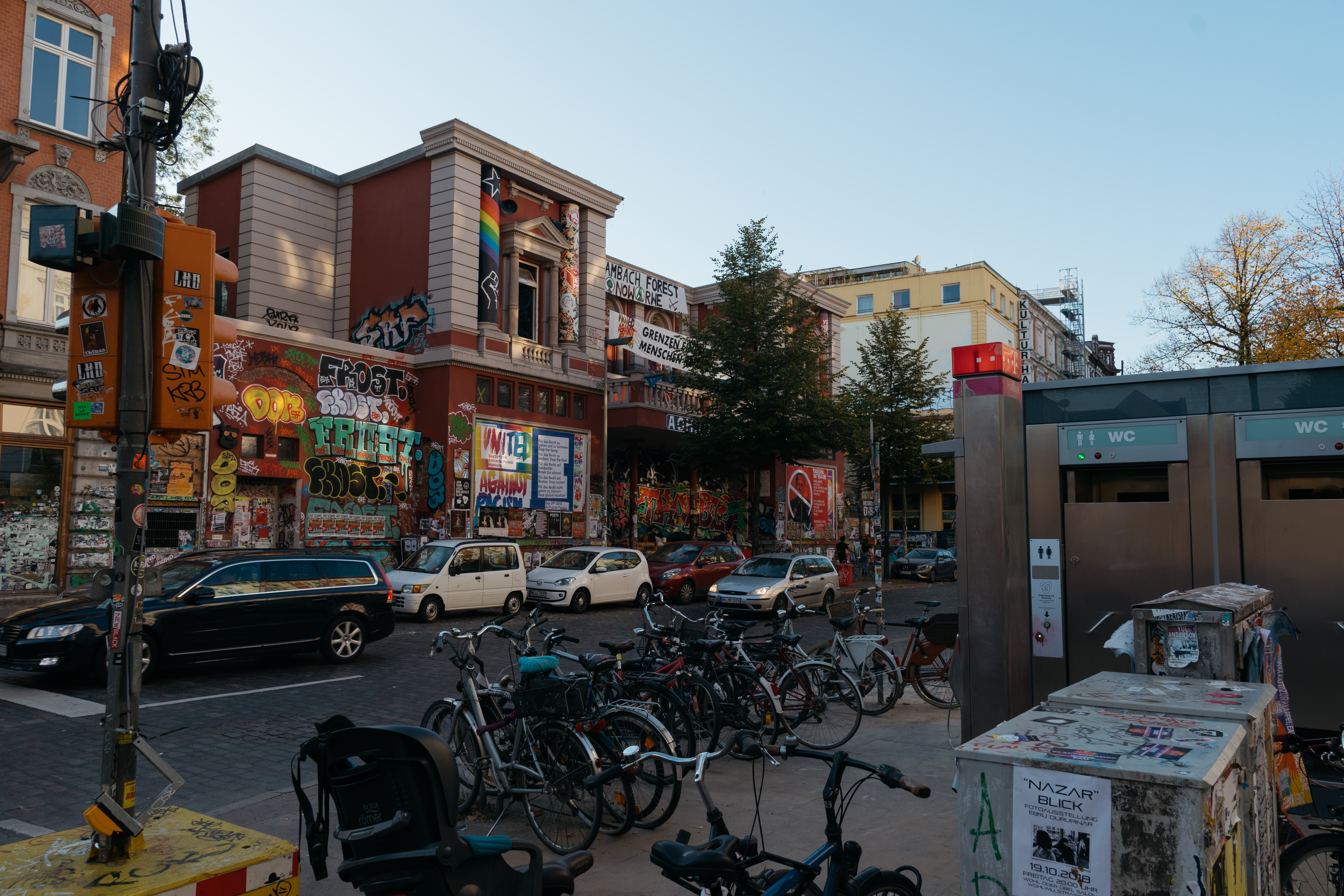
Rote Flora in the Sternschanze neighbourhood, Hamburg

=== Alternative culture ===
Hamburg has long been a centre of alternative music and counter-culture movements. The boroughs of St. Pauli, Sternschanze, and Altona are known for being home to many radical left-wing and anarchist groups, culminating every year during the traditional May Day demonstrations.

During the 2017 G20 summit, which took place in Hamburg from 7–8 July that year, protestors clashed violently with the police in the Sternschanze area and particularly around the Rote Flora. On 7 July, several cars were set on fire and street barricades were erected to prevent the police from entering the area. In response to that, the police made heavy use of water cannons and tear gas in order to scatter the protestors. However, this was met with strong resistance by protestors, resulting in a total of 160 injured police and 75 arrested participants in the protests.

After the summit, however, the Rote Flora issued a statement, in which it condemns the arbitrary acts of violence that were committed by some of the protestors whilst generally defending the right to use violence as a means of self-defence against police oppression. In particular, the spokesperson of the Rote Flora said that the autonomous cultural centre had a traditionally good relationship with its neighbours and local residents, since they were united in their fight against gentrification in that neighbourhood.

=== British, American and English-speaking culture ===
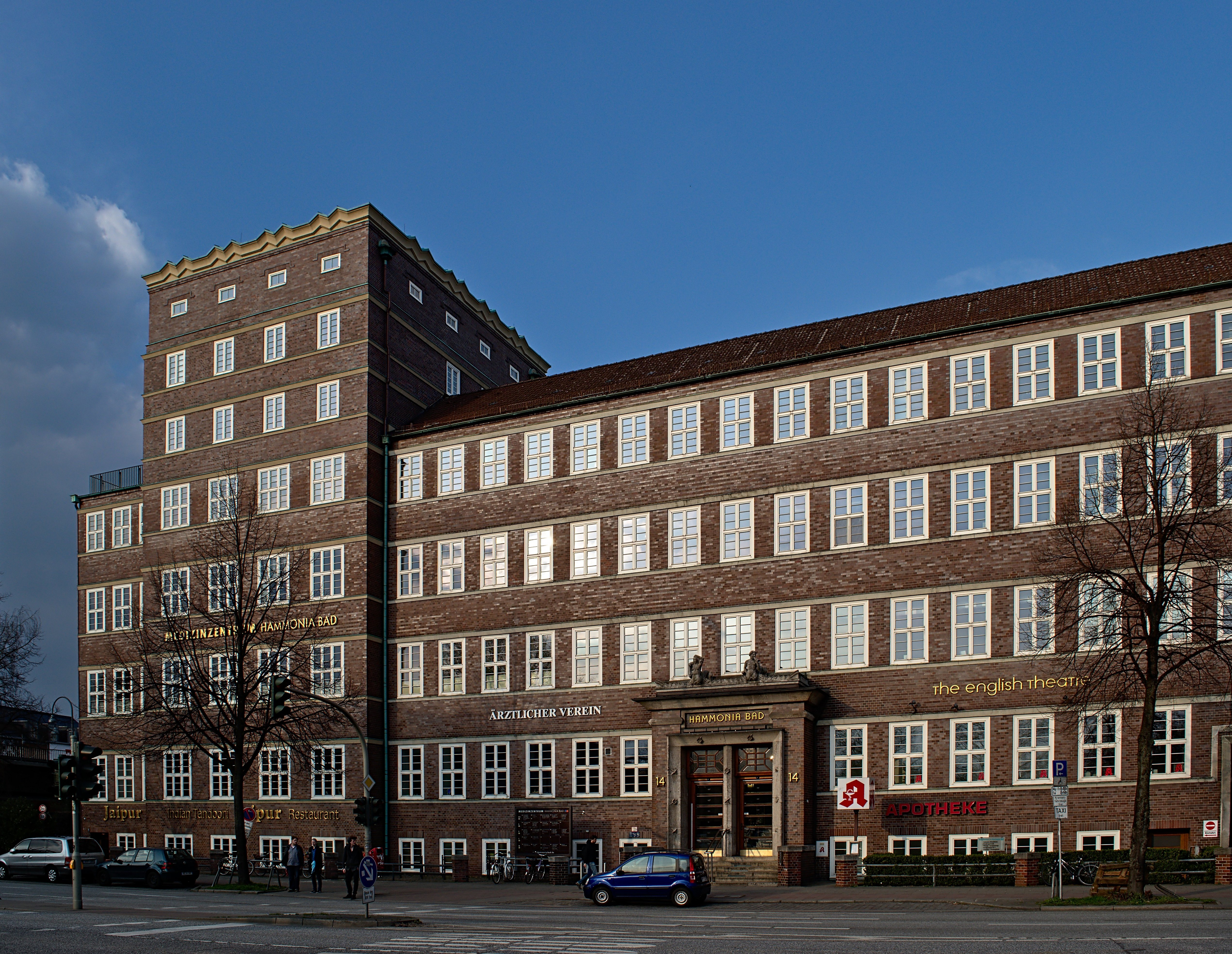
The English Theatre of Hamburg at Lerchenfeld 14

There are several English-speaking communities, such as the Caledonian Society of Hamburg, The British Club Hamburg, British and Commonwealth Luncheon Club, Anglo-German Club e.V., Professional Women's Forum, The British Decorative and Fine Arts Society, The English Speaking Union of the Commonwealth, The Scottish Country Dancers of Hamburg, The Hamburg Players e.V. English Language Theatre Group, The Hamburg Exiles Rugby Club, several cricket clubs, and The Morris Minor Register of Hamburg. Furthermore, the Anglo-Hanseatic Lodge No. 850 within the Grand Lodge of British Freemasons of Germany under the United Grand Lodges of Germany works in Hamburg, and has a diverse expat membership. There is also a 400-year-old Anglican church community worshipping at St Thomas Becket Church.

American and international English-speaking organisations include The American Club of Hamburg e.V., the American Women's Club of Hamburg, the English Speaking Union, the German-American Women's Club, and The International Women's Club of Hamburg e.V. The American Chamber of Commerce handles matters related to business affairs. The International School of Hamburg serves school children.

William Wordsworth, Dorothy Wordsworth, and Samuel Taylor Coleridge spent the last two weeks of September 1798 at Hamburg. Dorothy wrote a detailed journal of their stay, labelled "The Hamburg Journal (1798) by noted Wordsworth scholar Edward de Selincourt.

A Hamburg saying, referring to its anglophile nature, is: "Wenn es in London anfängt zu regnen, spannen die Hamburger den Schirm auf" ... "When it starts raining in London, people in Hamburg open their umbrellas".

=== Memorials ===
A memorial for English engineer William Lindley, who, beginning in 1842, reorganised the drinking water and sewerage system and thus helped to fight against cholera, is near Baumwall railway station in Vorsetzen street. 53.544198°N 9.979411°E

In 2009, more than 2,500 "stumbling blocks" (Stolpersteine) were laid, engraved with the names of deported and murdered citizens. Inserted into the pavement in front of their former houses, the blocks draw attention to the victims of Nazi persecution.

== Economy ==
The gross domestic product (GDP) of Hamburg was €119.0 billion in 2018, accounting for 3.6% of German economic output. GDP per capita adjusted for purchasing power was €59,600 or 197% of the EU27 average in the same year. The GDP per employee was 132% of the EU average. The city has a relatively high employment rate, at 88 percent of the working-age population, employed in over 160,000 businesses. The median gross salary in 2021 was €47,544, which is 9.29% higher than the median gross salary in Germany overall.

The unemployment rate stood at 6.1% in October 2018 and was higher than the German average.

Year	2000	2001	2002	2003	2004	2005	2006	2007	2008	2009	2010	2011	2012	2013	2014	2015	2016	2017	2018	2019
Unemployment rate (%)	8.9	8.3	9.0	9.9	9.7	11.3	11.0	9.1	8.1	8.6	8.2	7.8	7.5	7.4	7.6	7.4	7.1	6.8	6.3	6.1

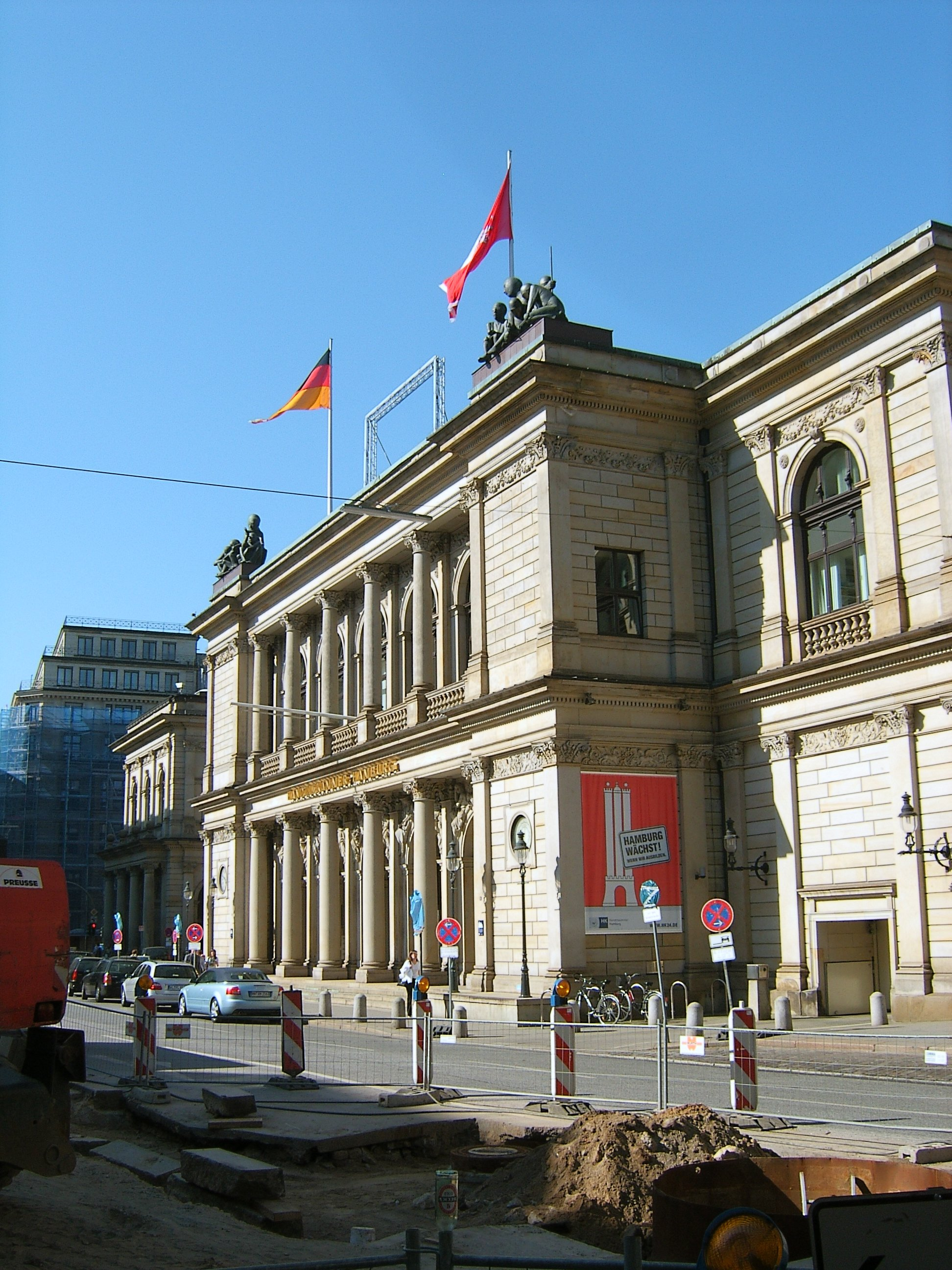
The Hamburg Stock Exchange

=== Banking ===
Hamburg has for centuries been a commercial centre of Northern Europe, and is the most important banking city of Northern Germany. The city is the seat of Germany's oldest bank, the Berenberg Bank, M.M.Warburg & CO, and Hamburg Commercial Bank. The Hamburg Stock Exchange is the oldest of its kind in Germany.

=== Port ===
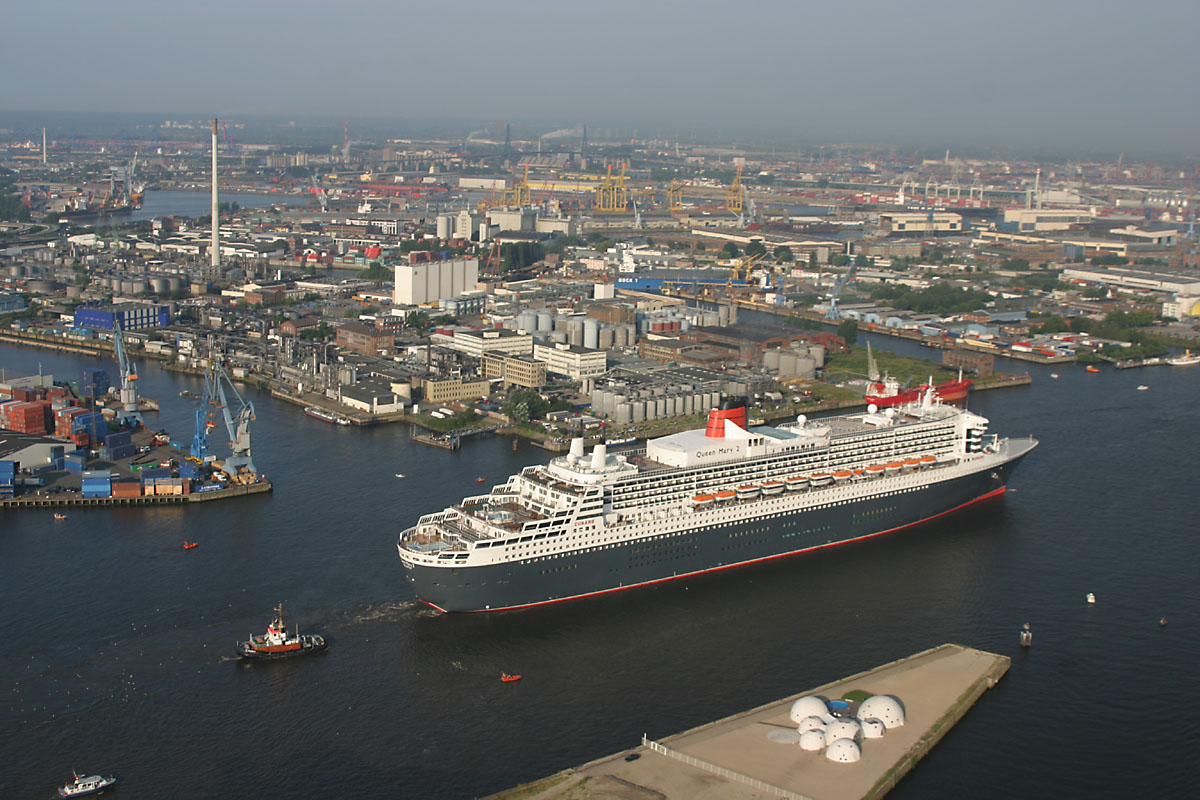
Queen Mary 2 at the Port of Hamburg

The most significant economic unit is the Port of Hamburg, which ranks third to Rotterdam and Antwerp in Europe and 17th-largest worldwide, with transshipments of 8.9 million twenty-foot equivalent units (TEU) of cargo and 138.2 million tons of goods in 2016. International trade is also the reason for the large number of consulates in the city. Although situated 110 kilometres (70 mi) up the Elbe, it is considered a seaport due to its ability to handle large ocean-going vessels.

=== Industrial production ===
Heavy industry of Hamburg includes the making of steel, aluminium, copper and various large shipyards such as Blohm + Voss.

Hamburg, along with Seattle and Toulouse, is an important location of the civil aerospace industry. Airbus, which operates the Hamburg-Finkenwerder assembly plant in Finkenwerder, employs over 13,000 people.

=== HafenCity ===
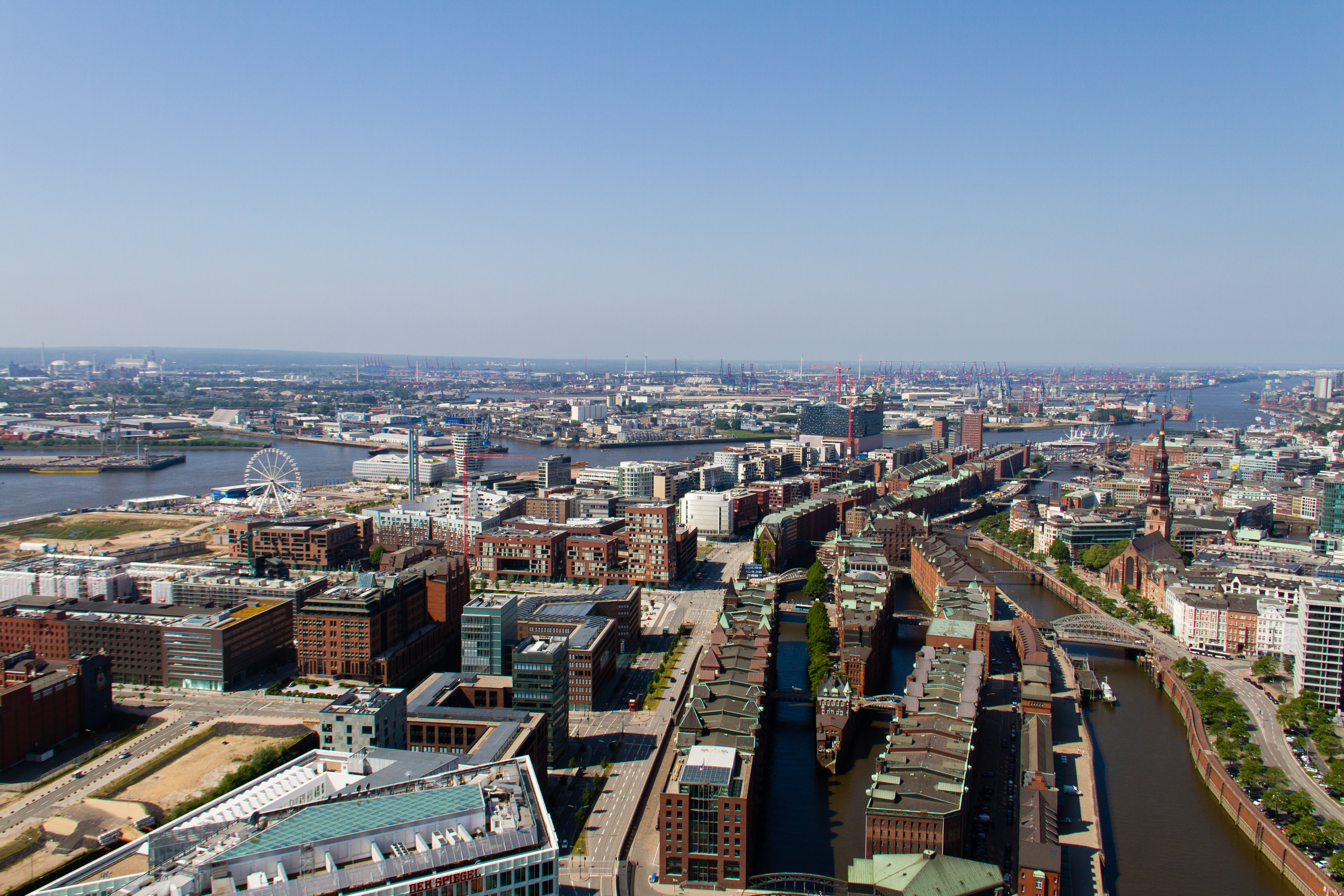
Western HafenCity area and Speicherstadt

The HafenCity is Europe's largest urban development project and is located in the Hamburg-Mitte district. It consists of the area of the Great Grasbrook, the northern part of the former Elbe island Grasbrook, and the warehouse district on the former Elbe island Kehrwieder and Wandrahm. It is bordered to the north, separated by the customs channel to Hamburg's city centre, west and south by the Elbe, and to the east, bounded by the upper harbour, Rothenburgsort. The district is full of rivers and streams and is surrounded by channels, and has a total area of about 2.2 square kilometres (0.85 sq mi).

HafenCity has 155 hectares (383 acres) in the area formerly belonging to the free port north of the Great Grasbrook. Residential units for up to 12,000 people are planned to be built on the site by around the mid-2020s, and jobs for up to 40,000 people, mainly in the office sector, should be created. It is the largest ongoing urban development project in Hamburg.

Construction work started in 2003, and in 2009 the first part of the urban development project was finished with the completion of the Dalmannkai / Sandtorkai neighbourhood – which is the first stage of the HafenCity project. According to the person responsible for the development and commercialisation of HafenCity, HafenCity Hamburg GmbH, half of the master plan underlying structural construction is already completed, whereas the other half is either under construction or is in the construction preparation stages.

=== Tourism ===
City logo of Hamburg

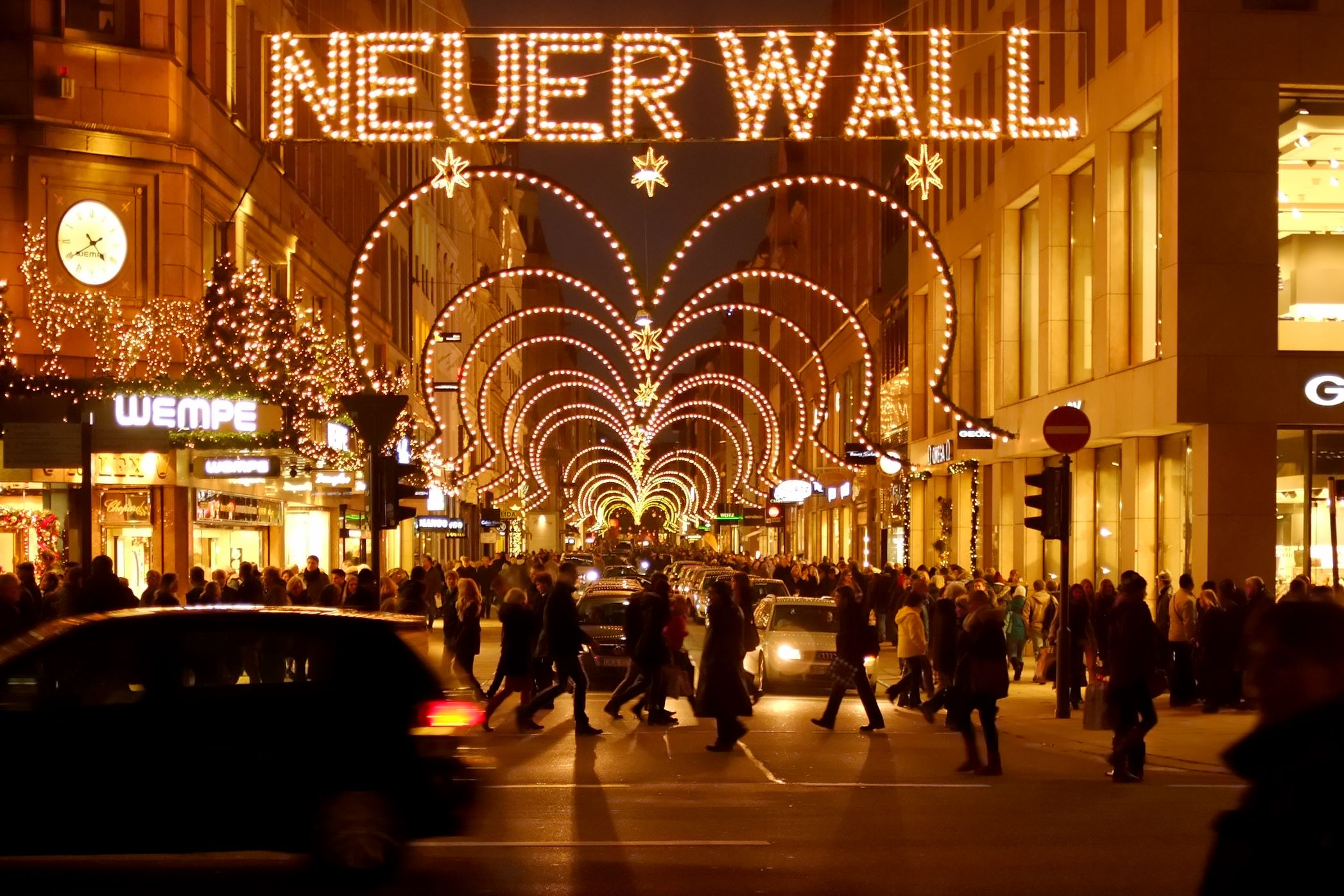
Neuer Wall, one of Europe's most luxurious shopping streets

In 2017, more than 6,783,000 visitors with 13,822,000 overnight stays visited the city. The tourism sector employs more than 175,000 people full-time and brings in revenue of almost €9 billion, making the tourism industry a major economic force in the Hamburg Metropolitan Region. Hamburg has one of the fastest-growing tourism industries in Germany. From 2001 to 2007, the overnight stays in the city increased by 55.2% (Berlin +52.7%, Mecklenburg-Vorpommern +33%).

The area of Reeperbahn, in the quarter St. Pauli, is Europe's largest red light district and home of strip clubs, brothels, bars, and nightclubs. The singer and actor Hans Albers is strongly associated with St. Pauli, and wrote the neighbourhood's unofficial anthem, "Auf der Reeperbahn Nachts um Halb Eins" ("On the Reeperbahn at Half Past Midnight"), in the 1940s. The Beatles had stints on the Reeperbahn early in their careers. Others prefer the laid-back neighbourhood Schanze, with its street cafés, or a barbecue on one of the beaches along the Elbe. Hamburg's zoo, the Tierpark Hagenbeck, was founded in 1907 by Carl Hagenbeck as the first zoo with moated, barless enclosures.

In 2016, the average visitor spent two nights in Hamburg. The majority of visitors come from Germany. Most foreigners are European, especially from Denmark (395,681 overnight stays), the United Kingdom (301,000 overnight stays), Switzerland (340,156 overnight stays), Austria (about 252,397 overnight stays), and the Netherlands (about 182,610 overnight stays). The largest group from outside Europe comes from the United States (206,614 overnight stays).

The Queen Mary 2 has docked regularly since 2004, and there were six departures planned from 2010 onwards.

=== Creative industries ===
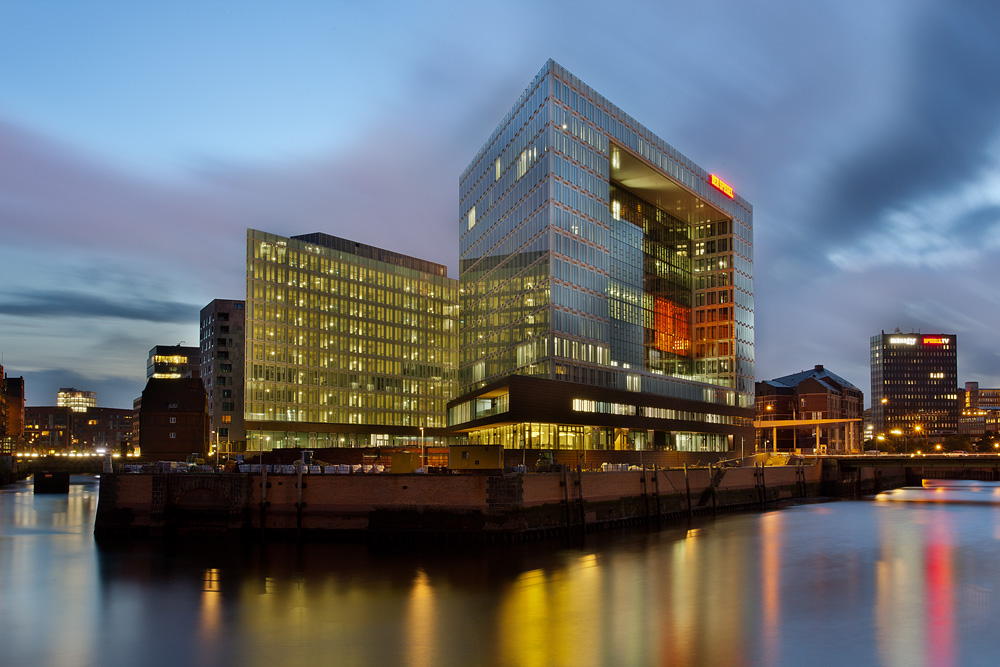
Der Spiegel headquarters

Media businesses employ over 70,000 people. The Norddeutscher Rundfunk, which includes the television station NDR Fernsehen, is based in Hamburg, including the news program Tagesschau, as are the commercial television station Hamburg 1, the Christian television station Bibel TV, and the civil media outlet Tide TV. There are regional radio stations such as Radio Hamburg. Some of Germany's largest publishing companies, Axel Springer AG, Gruner + Jahr, and Bauer Media Group, are located in the city. Many national newspapers and magazines, such as Der Spiegel and Die Zeit, are produced in Hamburg, as well as some special-interest newspapers such as Financial Times Deutschland. Hamburger Abendblatt and Hamburger Morgenpost are daily regional newspapers with a large circulation. There are music publishers, such as Warner Bros. Records Germany, and ICT firms such as Adobe Systems and Google Germany.

A total of about 2,000 companies are located in Hamburg that are active in the music industry. With over 17,000 employees and a gross value added of around 640 million euros, this industry is one of the strongest in the city. The Interessengemeinschaft Hamburger Musikwirtschaft and the Clubkombinat represent the companies in the industry. The interests of Hamburg musicians* are represented, for example, by RockCity Hamburg e.V..

Hamburg was one of the locations for the James Bond series film Tomorrow Never Dies. The Reeperbahn has been the location for many scenes, including the 1994 Beatles film Backbeat. The film A Most Wanted Man was set in and filmed in Hamburg. Hamburg was also shown in An American Tail, where Fievel Mousekewitz and his family immigrate to America in the hopes to escape cats.

== Infrastructure ==
=== Health systems ===
Hamburg has 54 hospitals. The University Medical Center Hamburg-Eppendorf, with about 1,736 beds, houses a large medical school. There are also smaller private hospitals. On 1 January 2011 there were about 12,507 hospital beds. The city had 5,663 physicians in private practice and 456 pharmacies in 2010.

=== Transport ===
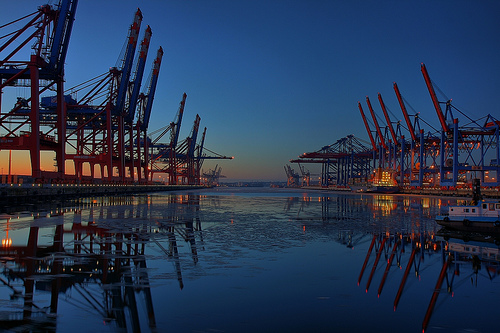
The Port of Hamburg on the Elbe

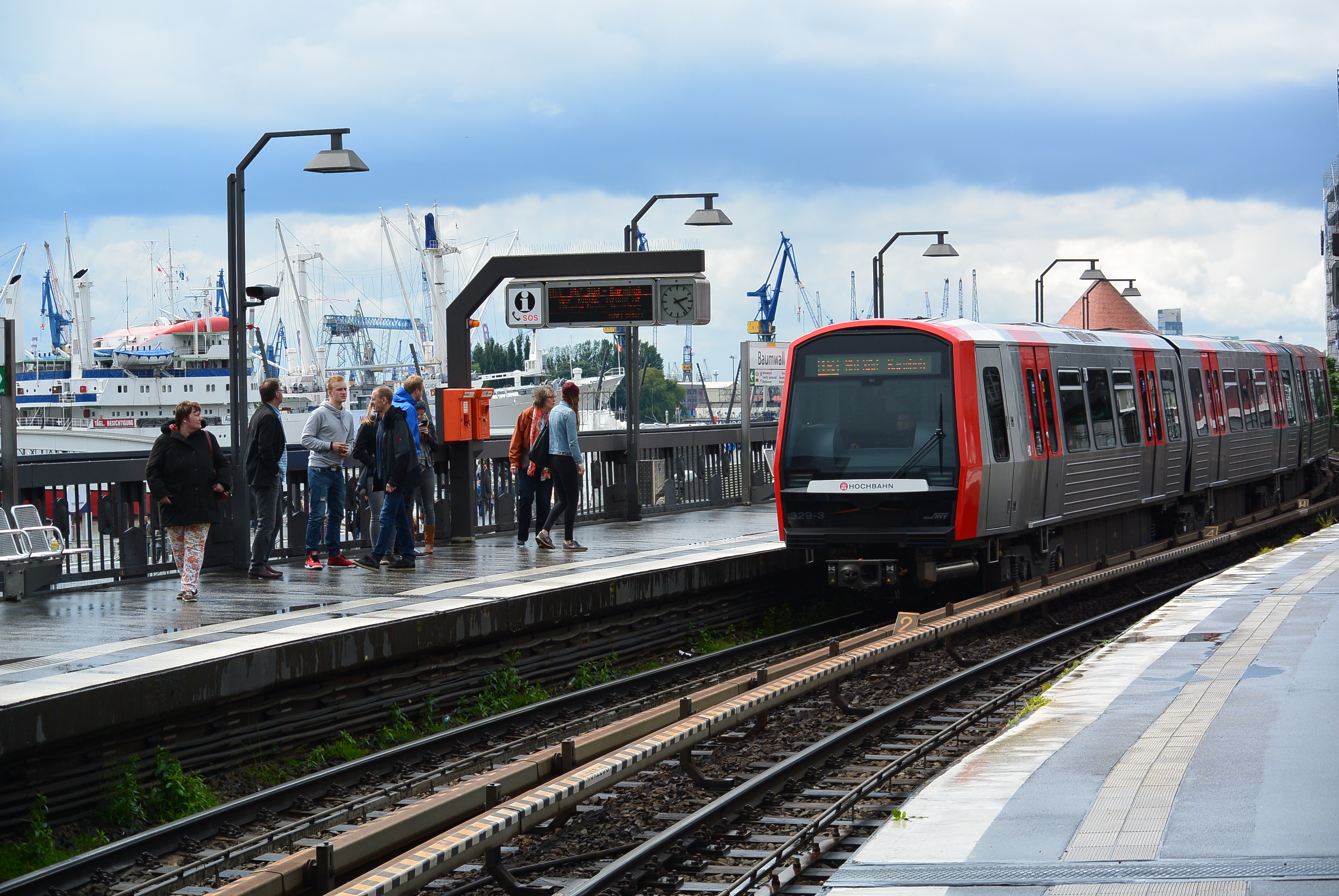
Baumwall station of the Hamburg U-Bahn

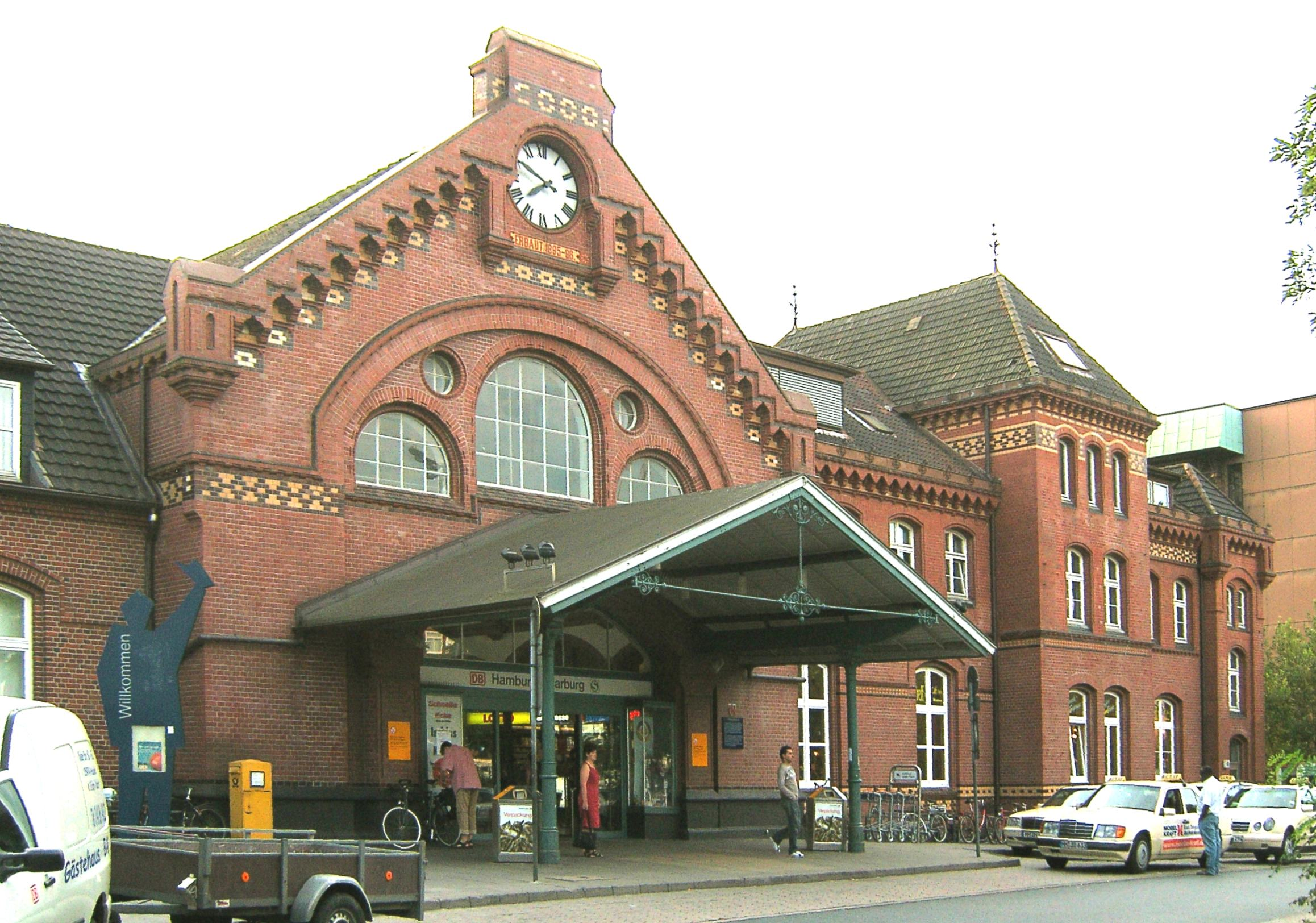
Hamburg Harburg train station

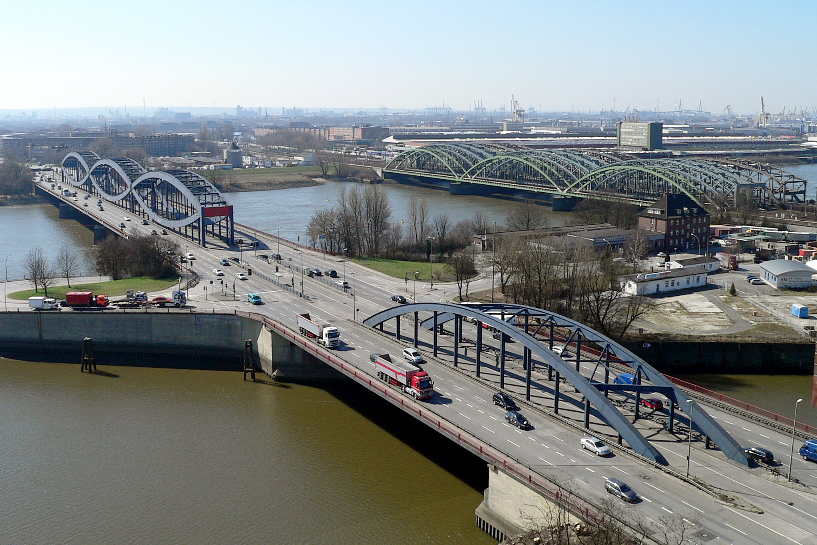
New and Freihafen-Elbbrücke

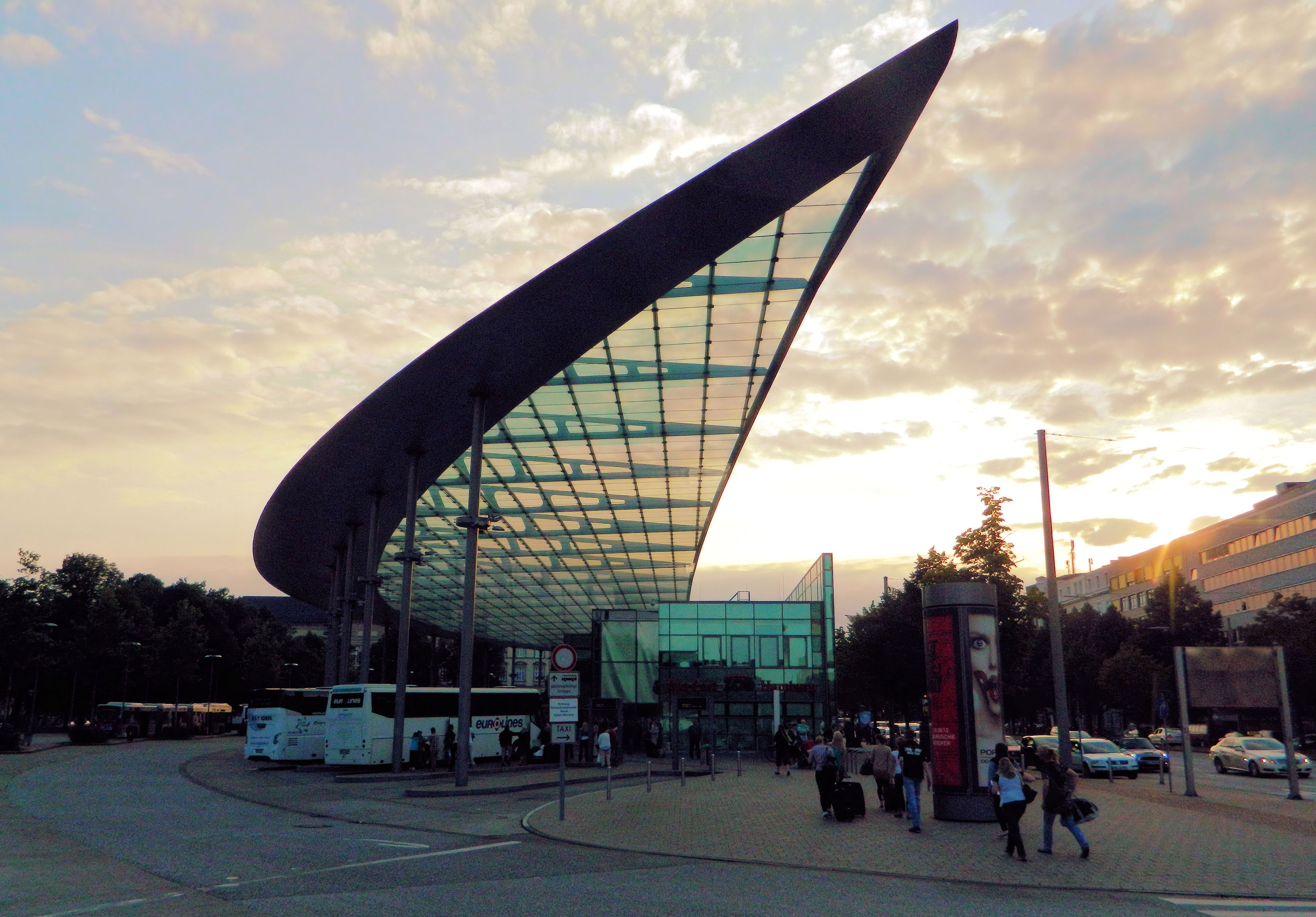
Long distance bus terminal ZOB Hamburg

HADAG ferry at Landungsbrücken station (yellow ship)

Logo of the transport association HVV

Hamburg is a major transportation hub, connected to four Autobahnen (motorways) and the most important railway junction on the route to Scandinavia.

Bridges and tunnels connect the northern and southern parts of the city, such as the old Elbe Tunnel (Alter Elbtunnel) or St. Pauli Elbtunnel (official name), which opened in 1911, today a major tourist sight, and the Elbe Tunnel (Elbtunnel), the crossing of a motorway.

Hamburg Airport is the oldest airport in Germany still in operation. There is also the smaller Hamburg Finkenwerder Airport, used only as a company airport for Airbus. Some airlines market Lübeck Airport in Lübeck as serving Hamburg.

Hamburg's licence plate prefix is "HH" (Hansestadt Hamburg; English: Hanseatic City of Hamburg), used between 1906 and 1945 and from 1956 onwards, rather than the single letter normally used for large cities since the introduction of Germany's current vehicle registration system in 1956, such as B for Berlin or M for Munich. "H" was Hamburg's prefix in the years between 1945 and 1947; it has used by Hanover since 1956.

Hamburg is located in the area of the transport association Hamburger Verkehrsverbund (HVV).

=== Public transport ===
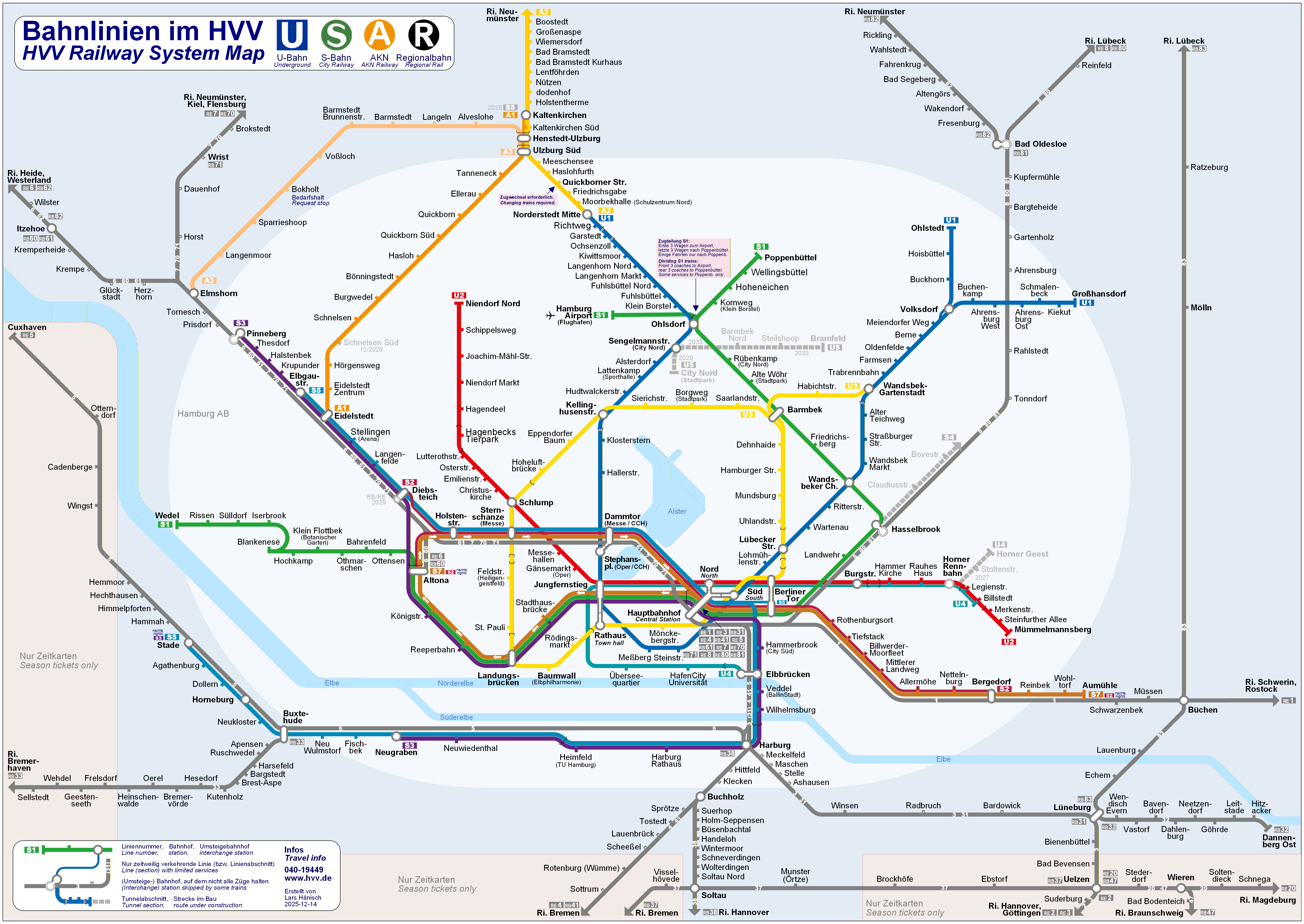
A map of the transit rail lines in Hamburg

Public transport by rail, bus, and ship is organised by the Hamburger Verkehrsverbund ("Hamburg transit authority") (HVV). Tickets sold by one company are valid on all other HVV companies' services. The HVV was the first organisation of this kind worldwide.

Thirty-three mass transit rail lines across the city are the backbone of public transport. The S-Bahn (commuter train system) comprises six lines and the U-Bahn four lines – U-Bahn is short for Untergrundbahn (underground railway). Approximately 41 km (25 mi) of 101 km (63 mi) of the U-Bahn is underground; most is on embankments or viaduct or at ground level. Older residents still speak of the system as Hochbahn (elevated railway), also because the operating company of the subway is the Hamburger Hochbahn. The AKN railway connects satellite towns in Schleswig-Holstein to the city. On some routes regional trains of Germany's major railway company Deutsche Bahn AG and the regional metronom trains may be used with an HVV ticket. Regional trains stop at various stations within city limits such as the four larger stations, Hauptbahnhof, Dammtor, Altona, and Harburg, as well as Hamburg Hasselbrook and Hamburg Bergedorf. The tram system was opened in 1866 and shut down in 1978.

Gaps in the rail network are filled by more than 669 bus routes, operated by single-deck two-, three- and four-axle diesel buses. Hamburg has no trams or trolleybuses, but has hydrogen-fuelled buses. The buses run frequently during working hours, with buses on the MetroBus routes running every ten minutes from 6 am to 9 pm. On special weekday night lines the intervals can be 30 minutes or more, while on normal days (Monday-Friday) normal buses stop running at night (some lines run 24 hours a day, every day of the year at least every half hour).

There are eight ferry lines along the Elbe, operated by HADAG, that fall under the aegis of the HVV. While mainly used by citizens and dock workers, they can also be used for sightseeing tours.

There are additionally several cruise terminals each suited to different sizes of ship all of which feature power connections large enough to allow suitably equipped ships to plug in and turn off all their engines.

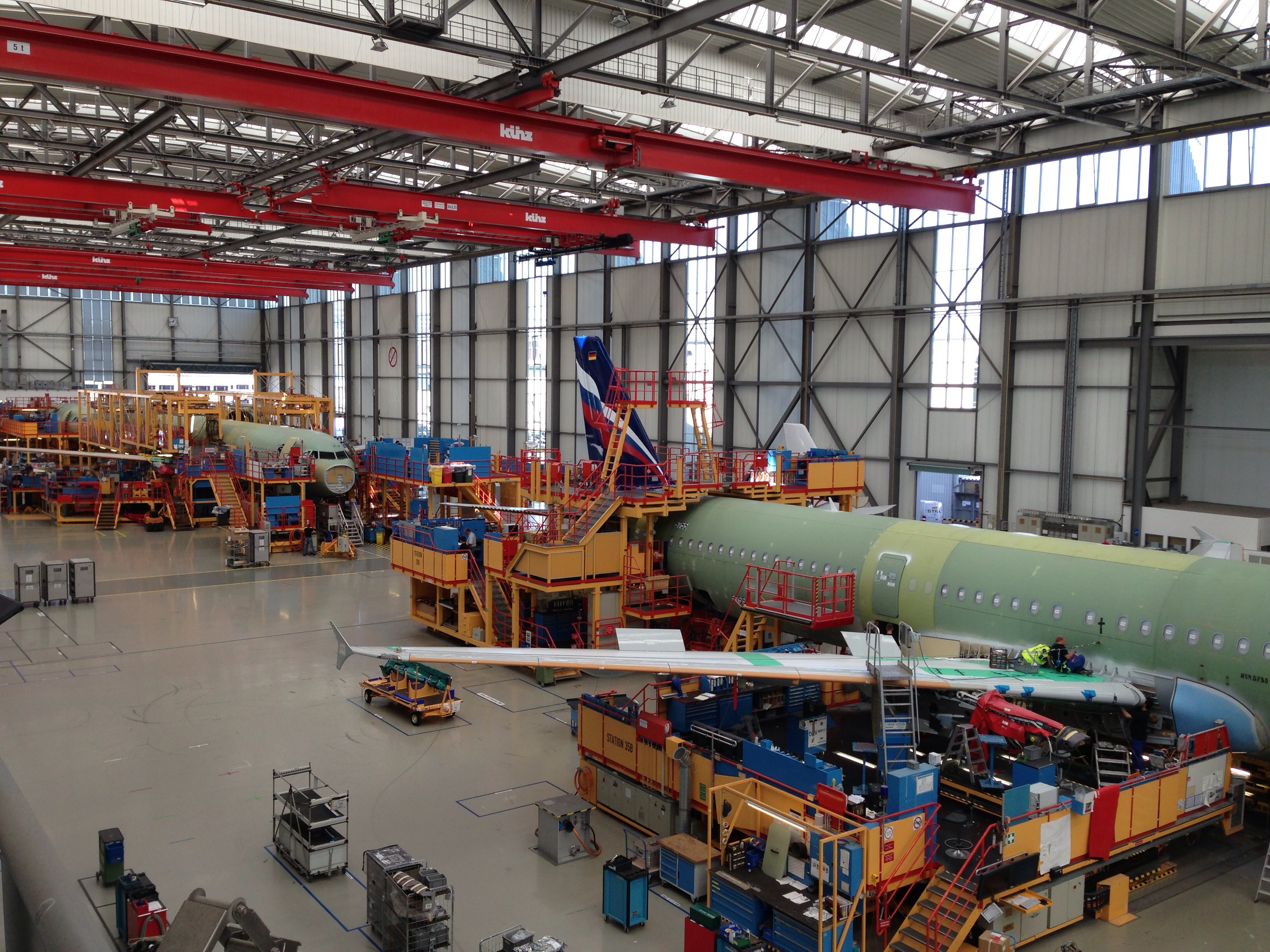
An Airbus A321 on final assembly line 3 in the Airbus Hamburg-Finkenwerder plant

The international airport serving Hamburg, Hamburg Airport Helmut Schmidt (IATA: HAM, ICAO: EDDH; formerly and still informally named Hamburg Fuhlsbüttel Airport), is the fifth biggest and oldest airport in Germany, having been established in 1912 and located about 5 miles (8 kilometres) from the city centre. About 60 airlines provide service to 125 destination airports, including some long-distance destinations like Newark, New Jersey on United Airlines, Dubai on Emirates, and Tehran on Iran Air. Hamburg was a secondary hub for Lufthansa, which was at one time the largest carrier at the airport, but has subsequently moved all its routes except the ones to its primary hubs in Frankfurt and Munich to its subsidiary Eurowings. Lufthansa also operates one of its biggest Lufthansa Technik maintenance facilities in Fuhlsbüttel. The second airport is located in Hamburg-Finkenwerder, officially named Hamburg Finkenwerder Airport (IATA: XFW, ICAO: EDHI). It is about 10 km (6 mi) from the city centre and is a nonpublic airport for the Airbus plant. It is the second biggest Airbus plant, after Toulouse, and the third biggest aviation manufacturing plant after Seattle and Toulouse; the plant houses the final assembly lines for A318, A319, A320, A321, and A380 aircraft.

Public transportation statistics

The average amount of time people spend commuting with public transit in Hamburg, for example to and from work, on a weekday is 58 min. 16% of public transit riders, ride for more than two hours every day. The average amount of time people wait at a stop or station for public transit is 11 min, while 11% of riders wait for over 20 minutes on average every day. The average distance people usually ride in a single trip with public transit is 8.9 km, while 21% travel for over 12 km in a single direction.

=== Utilities ===
Electricity for Hamburg and Northern Germany is largely provided by Vattenfall Europe, formerly the state-owned Hamburgische Electricitäts-Werke. Vattenfall Europe used to operate the Brunsbüttel Nuclear Power Plant and Krümmel Nuclear Power Plant, both taken out of service as part of the nuclear power phase-out. In addition, E.ON operates the Brokdorf Nuclear Power Plant, near Hamburg. There are also the coal-fired Wedel, Tiefstack, and Moorburg CHP Plant, and the fuel-cell power plant in the HafenCity quarter. VERA Klärschlammverbrennung uses the biosolids of the Hamburg wastewater treatment plant; the Pumpspeicherwerk Geesthacht is a pump storage power plant and a solid waste combustion power station is Müllverwertung Borsigstraße.

In June 2019, Hamburg introduced a law governing the phasing out of coal based thermal and electric energy production ("Kohleausstiegsgesetz"). This move was the result of negotiations between parliamentary parties and representatives of a campaign called Tschuess Kohle] ("Goodbye Coal"). In 2020, the city's Ministry for Environment and Energy announced a partnership with Namibia as a potential supplier of woody biomass, sourced through landscape maintenance in areas affected by woody plant encroachment, to replace coal.

== Sports ==
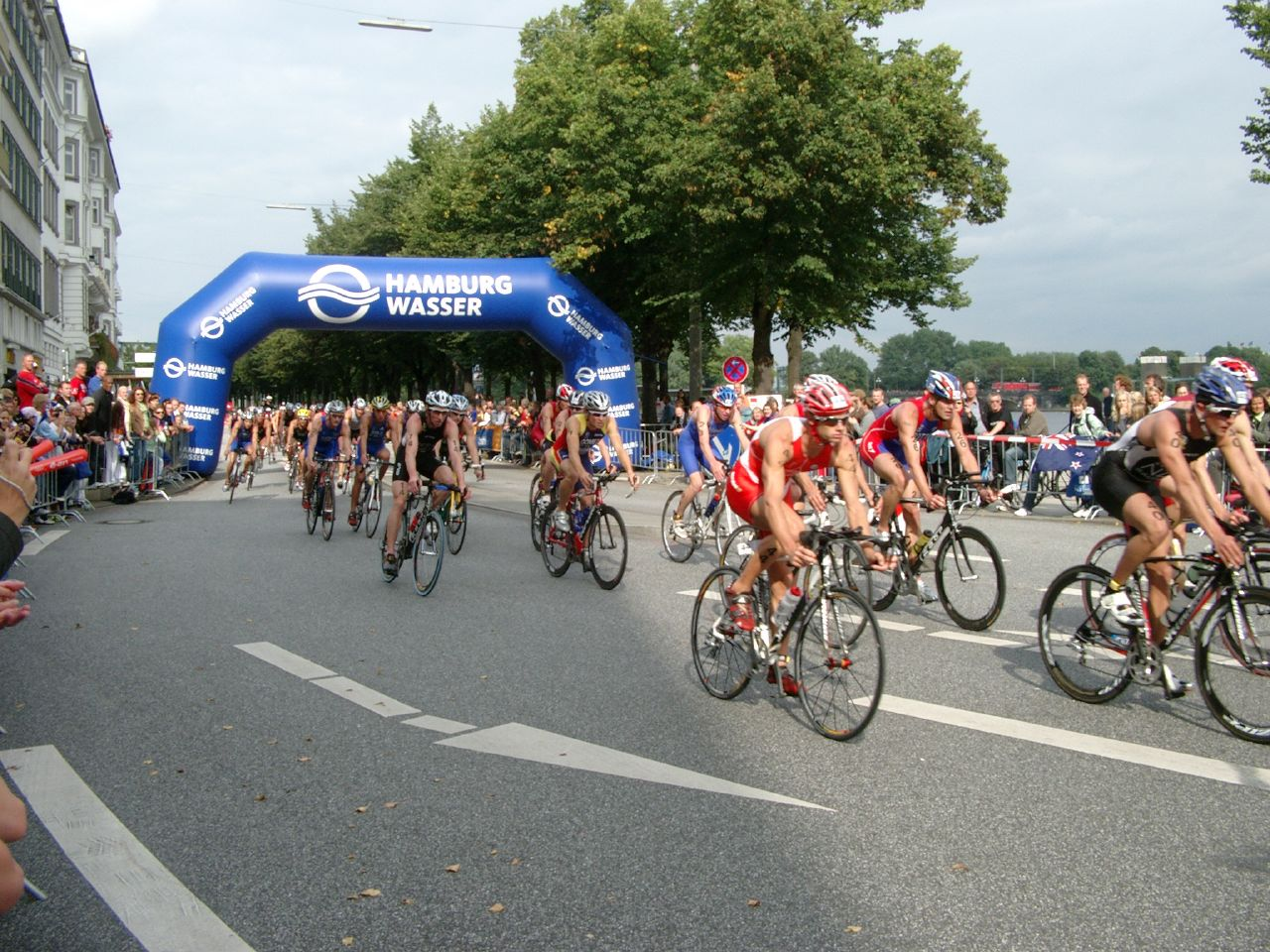
Hamburg City Man 2007 at the Binnenalster

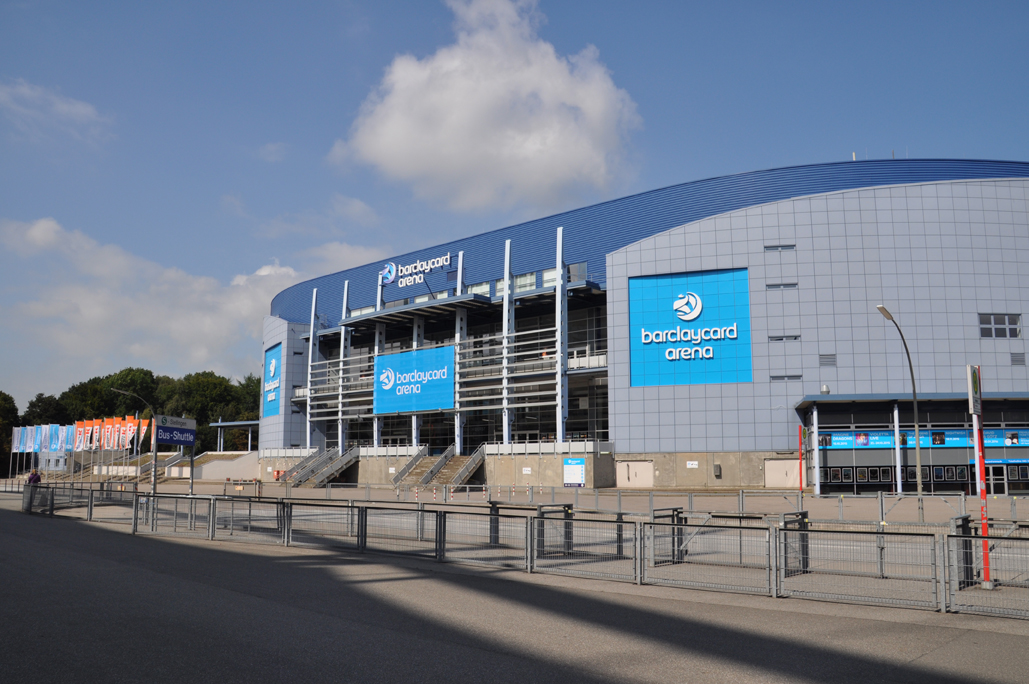
Barclays Arena

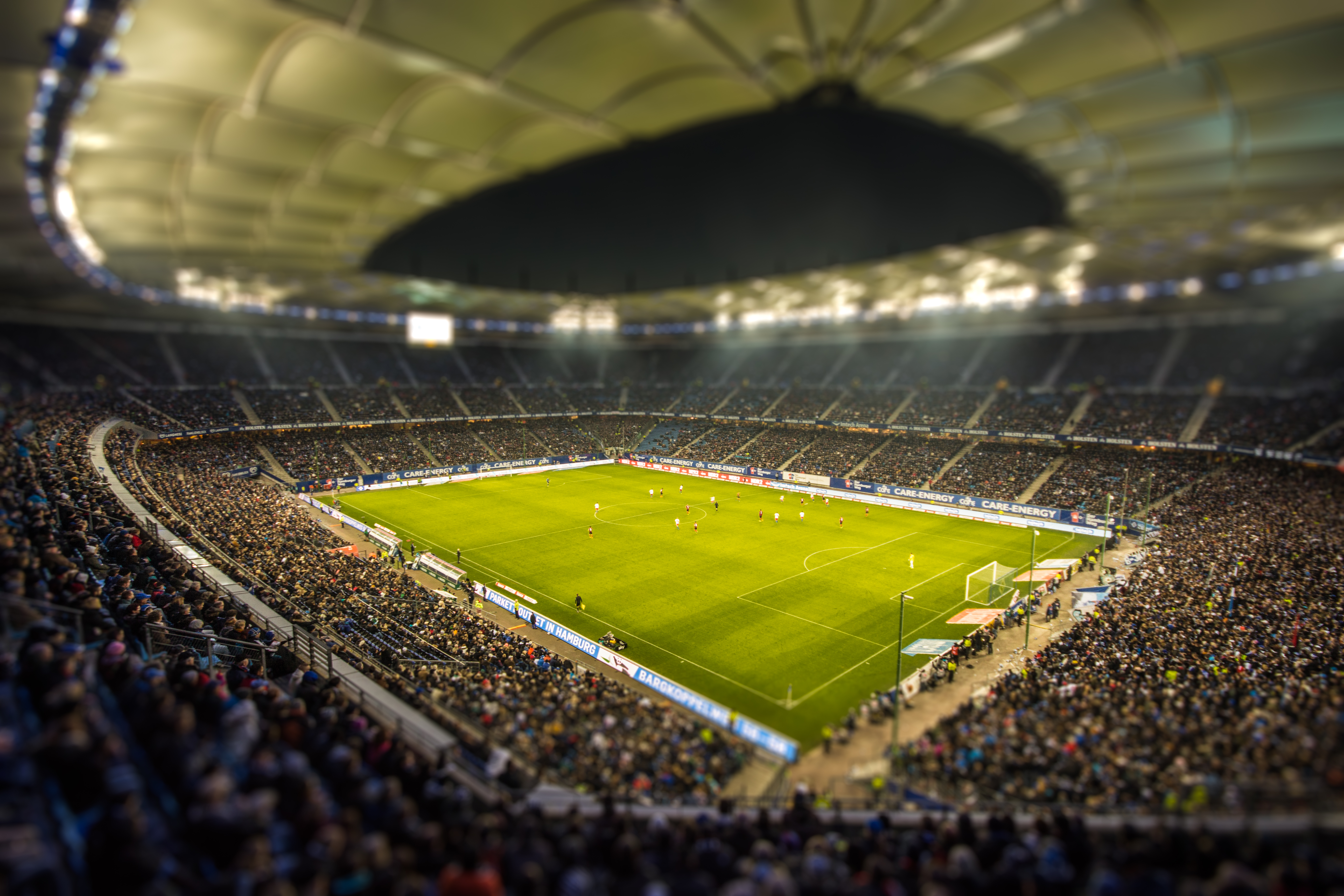
Volksparkstadion

Hamburger SV is a football team playing in the Bundesliga. HSV was six times German champion, three times winner of the German Cup, and triumphed in the European Cup in 1983, as well as having participated in the group stages of the Champions League twice: in 2000–01 and 2006–07. They play at the Volksparkstadion. The HSV was the oldest team of the Bundesliga, playing in the league since its beginning in 1963, until a change of results saw them relegated from the Bundesliga in 2018.

FC St. Pauli is a Bundesliga football club that finished in second place in the 2009–10 2. Bundesliga season and qualified to play alongside Hamburger SV in the first division for the first time since the 2001–02 season. St. Pauli played a division above HSV for the first time ever following promotion to the Bundesliga in the 2023–24 season and. St. Pauli's home games take place at the Millerntor-Stadion.

The Hamburg Freezers represented Hamburg until 2016 in the DEL, the premier ice hockey league in Germany.

HSV Handball represented Hamburg until 2016 in the German handball league. In 2007, HSV Handball won the European Cupwinners Cup. The Club won the league in the 2010–11 season and had an average attendance of 10,690 in the O2 World Hamburg the same year. The most recent success for the team was the EHF Champions League win in 2013. Since 2014, the club has suffered from economic problems. On 20 January 2016, their licence was removed due to violations following the continued economic struggles. In 2016–17, they were not allowed to play in the first or second league. The team lives on through their former second team (now their main team) in the third division (2016–2018) and in second division (since 2018).

The BCJ Hamburg played in the Basketball Bundesliga from 1999 to 2001. Later, the Hamburg Towers became the city's prime team. The Towers promoted to Germany's top division in 2019. In 2022, they already reached the playoffs. The Towers play their home games at the Inselpark Arena in Wilhelmsburg.

Hamburg is the nation's field hockey capital and dominates the men's as well as the women's Bundesliga. As of 2025, the city hosted 5 of the 12 men's first league teams: Der Club an der Alster, Hamburger Polo Club, Großflottbeker TGHC, Harvesterhuder THC, and Uhlenhorster Hockey Club.

The Hamburg Warriors are one of Germany's top lacrosse clubs. The club has grown immensely in the last several years and includes at least one youth team, three men's, and two women's teams. The team participates in the Deutsch Lacrosse Verein. The Hamburg Warriors are part of the Harvestehuder Tennis- und Hockey-Club e.V (HTHC).

Hamburg Blue Devils was one of the prominent American football teams playing in German Football League before its exit in 2017. Hamburg Sea Devils is a team of European League of Football (ELF), which is a planned professional league, that is set to become the first fully professional league in Europe since the demise of NFL Europe. The Sea Devils will start playing games in June 2021.

There are also the Hamburg Dockers, an Australian rules football club. The FC St. Pauli team dominates women's rugby in Germany. Other first-league teams include VT Aurubis Hamburg (Volleyball) and Hamburger Polo Club. Eimsbütteler TV plays in the German Women's 2 Volleyball Bundesliga. There are also several minority sports clubs, including four cricket clubs.

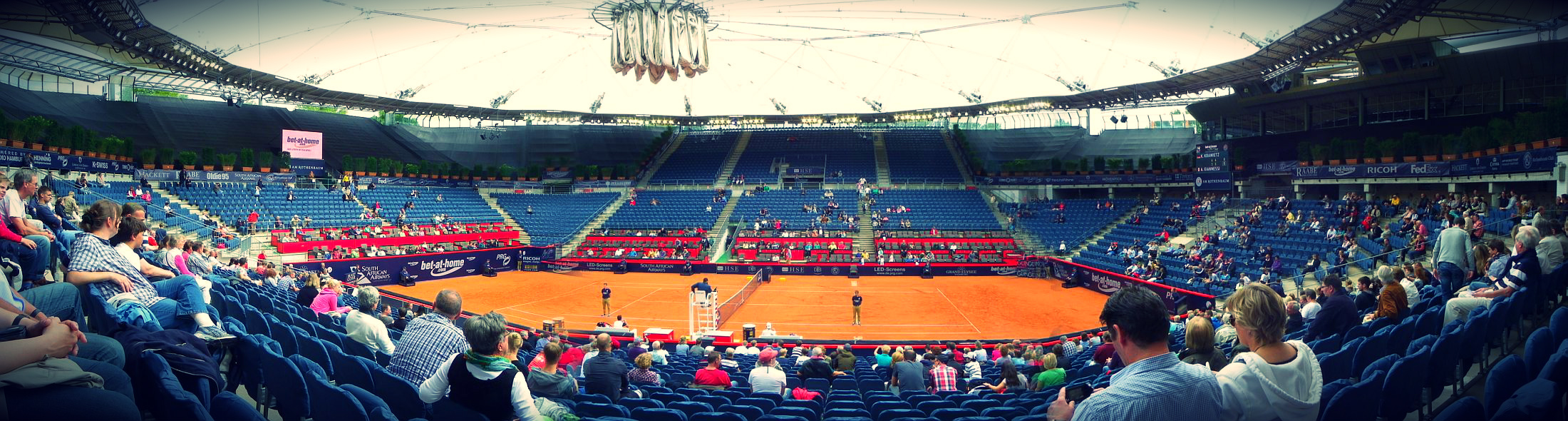
Am Rothenbaum is the main tennis stadium of the International German Open.

The Centre Court of the Tennis Am Rothenbaum venue, with a capacity of 13,200 people, is the largest in Germany.

Hamburg also hosts equestrian events at Reitstadion Klein Flottbek (Deutsches Derby in jumping and dressage) and Horner Rennbahn (Deutsches Derby flat racing). The city also owns the harness racing track "Trabrennbahn Bahrenfeld". The Hamburg Marathon is the biggest marathon in Germany after Berlin's. In 2008, 23,230 participants were registered. World Cup events in cycling, the UCI ProTour competition EuroEyes Cyclassics, and the triathlon ITU World Cup event Hamburg City Man are also held in here.

Volksparkstadion was used as a site for the 2006 World Cup. In 2010 UEFA held the final of the UEFA Europa League in the arena.

Hamburg made a bid for the 2024 Olympic Games, but 51.7 percent of those city residents participating in a referendum in November 2015 voted against continuing Hamburg's bid to host the games. Meanwhile, Hamburg's partner city Kiel voted in favour of hosting the event, with almost 66 percent of all participants supporting the bid. Opponents of the bid had argued that hosting the 33rd Olympic Games would cost the city too much in public funds. A second referendum was held on 31 May 2026 on whether Hamburg should pursue a bid for the 2036, 2040 or 2044 Olympic and Paralympic Games; this proposal was also rejected, with 54.9 percent voting against it and 45.1 percent voting in favour.

== Education ==
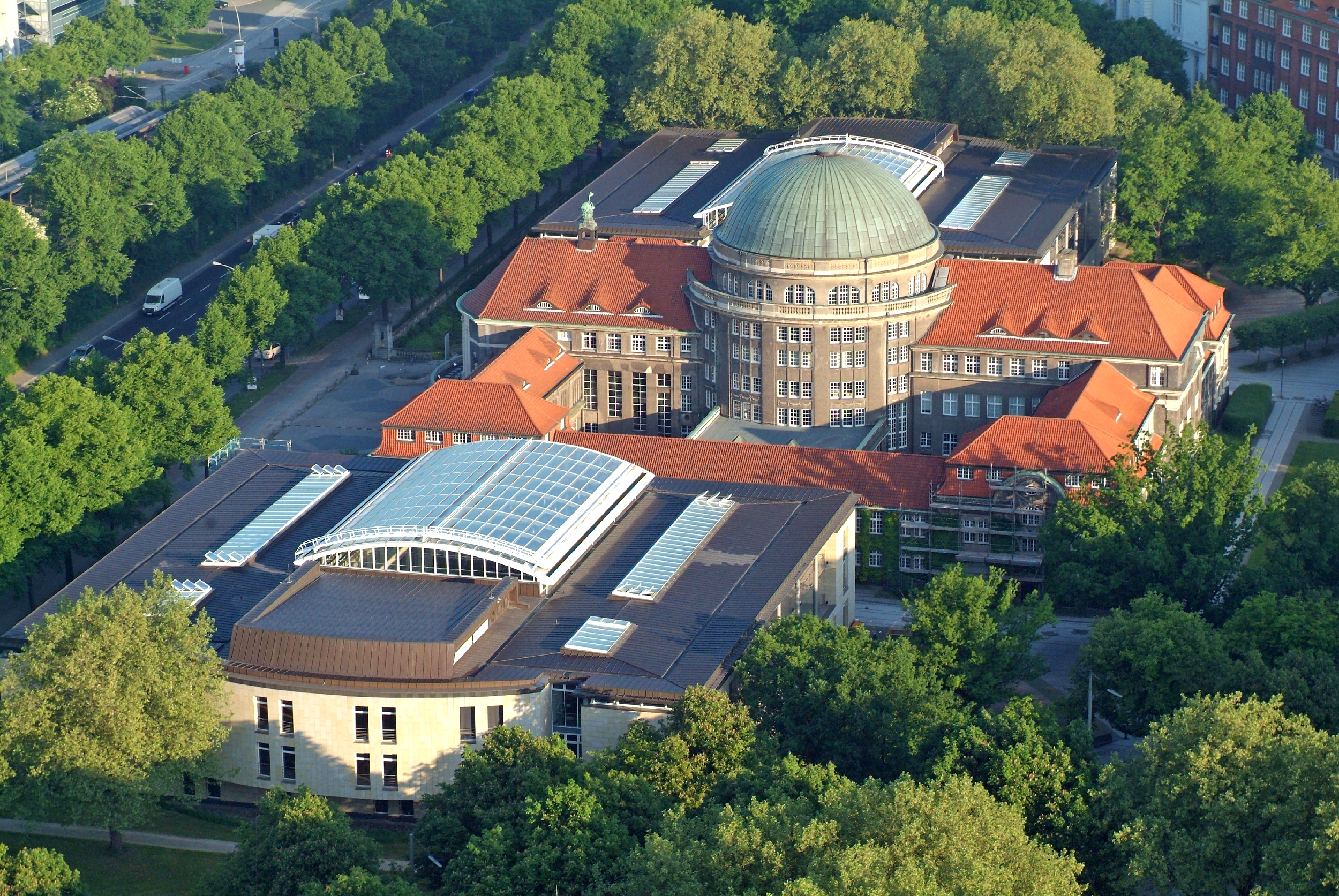
The main building of the University of Hamburg

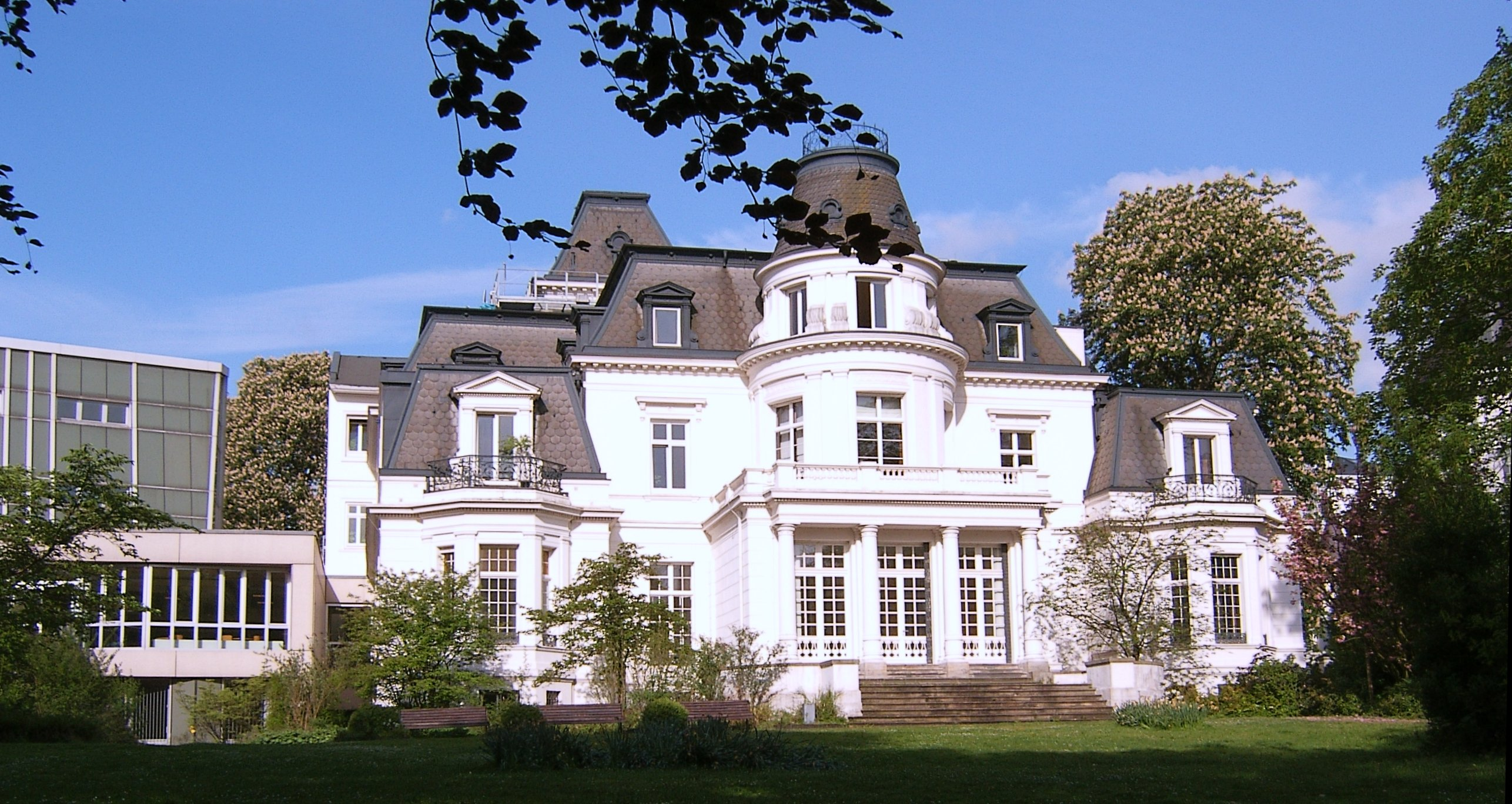
The University of Music and Theatre

The school system is managed by the Hamburg Authority of Schools, Families and Vocational Training (Behörde für Schule, Familie und Berufsbildung). The system had approximately 191,148 students in 221 primary schools and 188 secondary schools in 2016. There are 32 public libraries in Hamburg.

Nineteen universities are located in Hamburg, with about 100,589 university students in total, including 9,000 resident students. Six universities are public, including the largest, the University of Hamburg (Universität Hamburg) with the University Medical Center Hamburg-Eppendorf, the University of Music and Theatre, the Hamburg University of Applied Sciences, the HafenCity University Hamburg, and the Hamburg University of Technology. Seven universities are private, like the Bucerius Law School, the Kühne Logistics University, and the HSBA Hamburg School of Business Administration. The city has also smaller private colleges and universities, including many religious and special-purpose institutions, such as the Helmut Schmidt University (formerly the University of the Federal Armed Forces Hamburg). Hamburg is home to one of the oldest international schools in Germany, the International School of Hamburg.

== Twin towns – sister cities ==
Hamburg is twinned with:

- Saint Petersburg, Russia (1957)
- Marseille, France (1958)
- Shanghai, China (1986)
- Dresden, Germany (1987)
- León, Nicaragua (1989)
- Osaka, Japan (1989)
- Prague, Czech Republic (1990)
- Chicago, United States (1994)
- Dar es Salaam, Tanzania (2010)

== Notable people ==
In Hamburg it's hard to find a native Hamburger. A hurried and superficial search turns up only crayfish, people from Pinneberg, and those from Bergedorf. One accompanies the contented little kippers of a striving society; mackerels from Stade, sole from Finkenwerder, herrings from Cuxhaven swim in expectant throngs through the streets of my city and lobsters patrol the stock exchange with open claws.... The first so-called unguarded glance always lands on the bottom of the sea and falls into twilight of the aquarium. Heinrich Heine must have had the same experience when he tried, with his cultivated scorn and gifted melancholy, to find the people of Hamburg.

— Siegfried Lenz, in Leute von Hamburg (People of Hamburg) ISBN 978-3-423-11538-4.

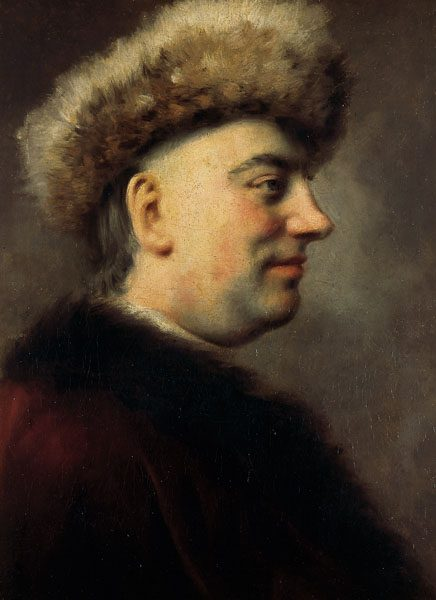
Barthold Heinrich Brockes

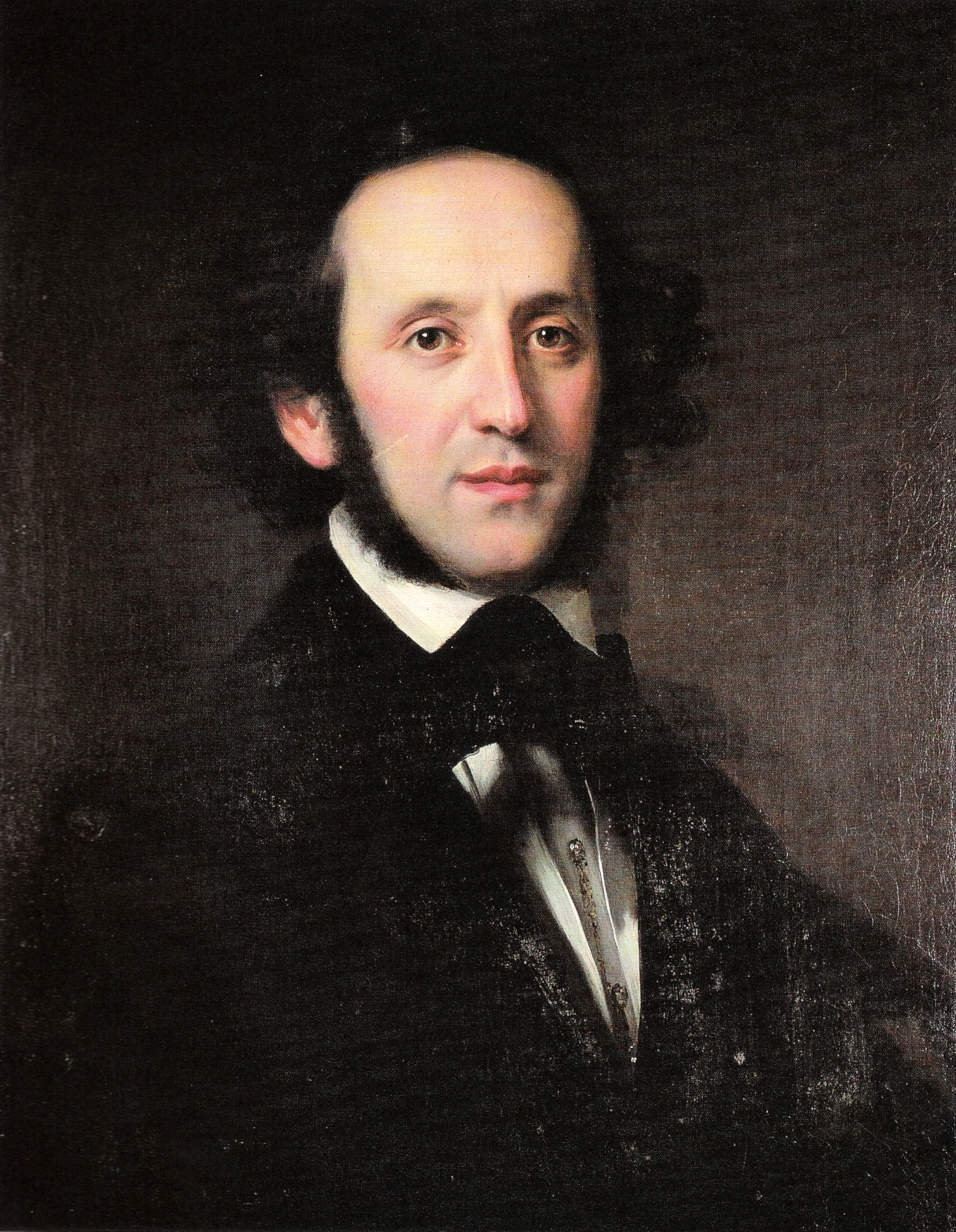
Felix Mendelssohn Bartholdy

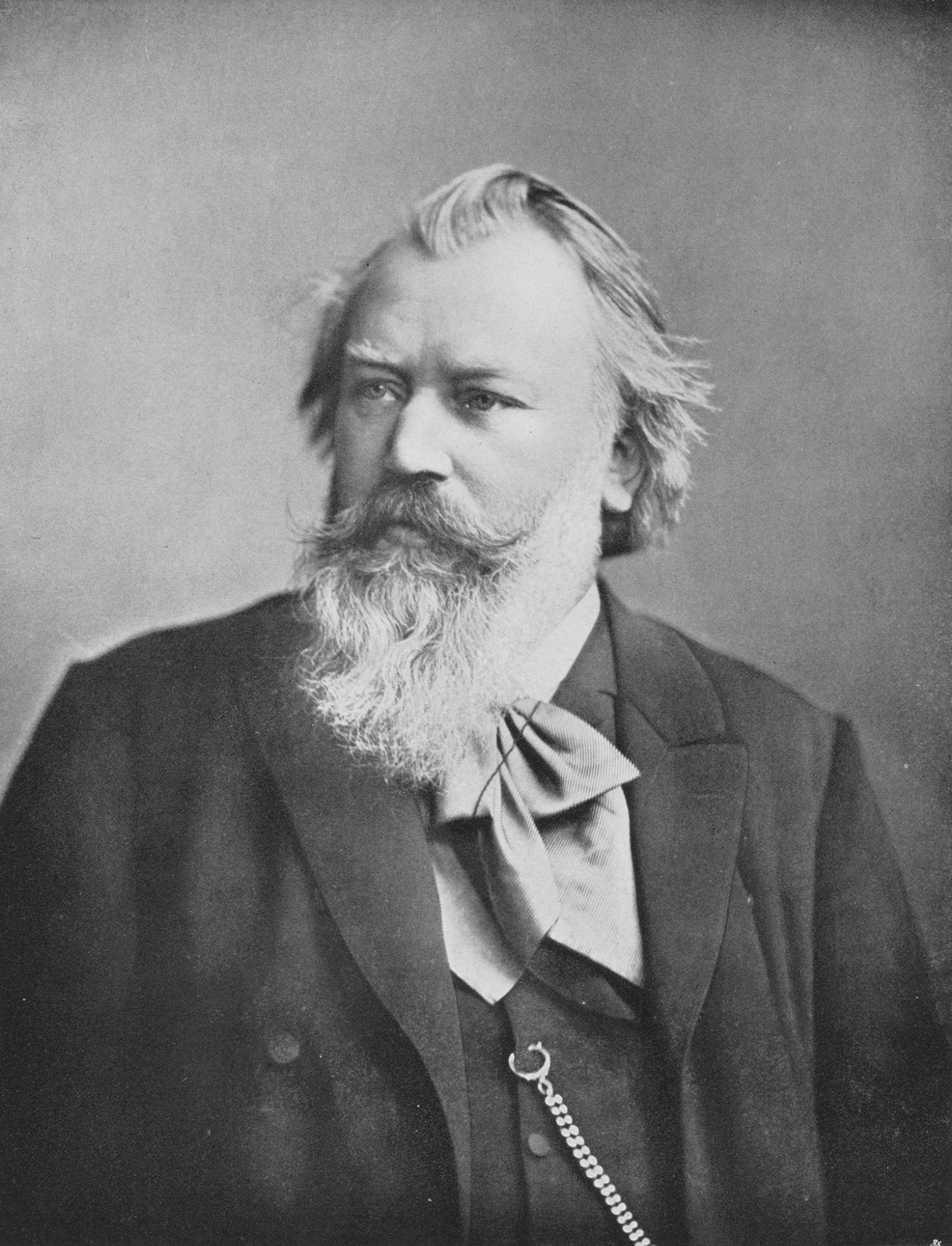
Johannes Brahms

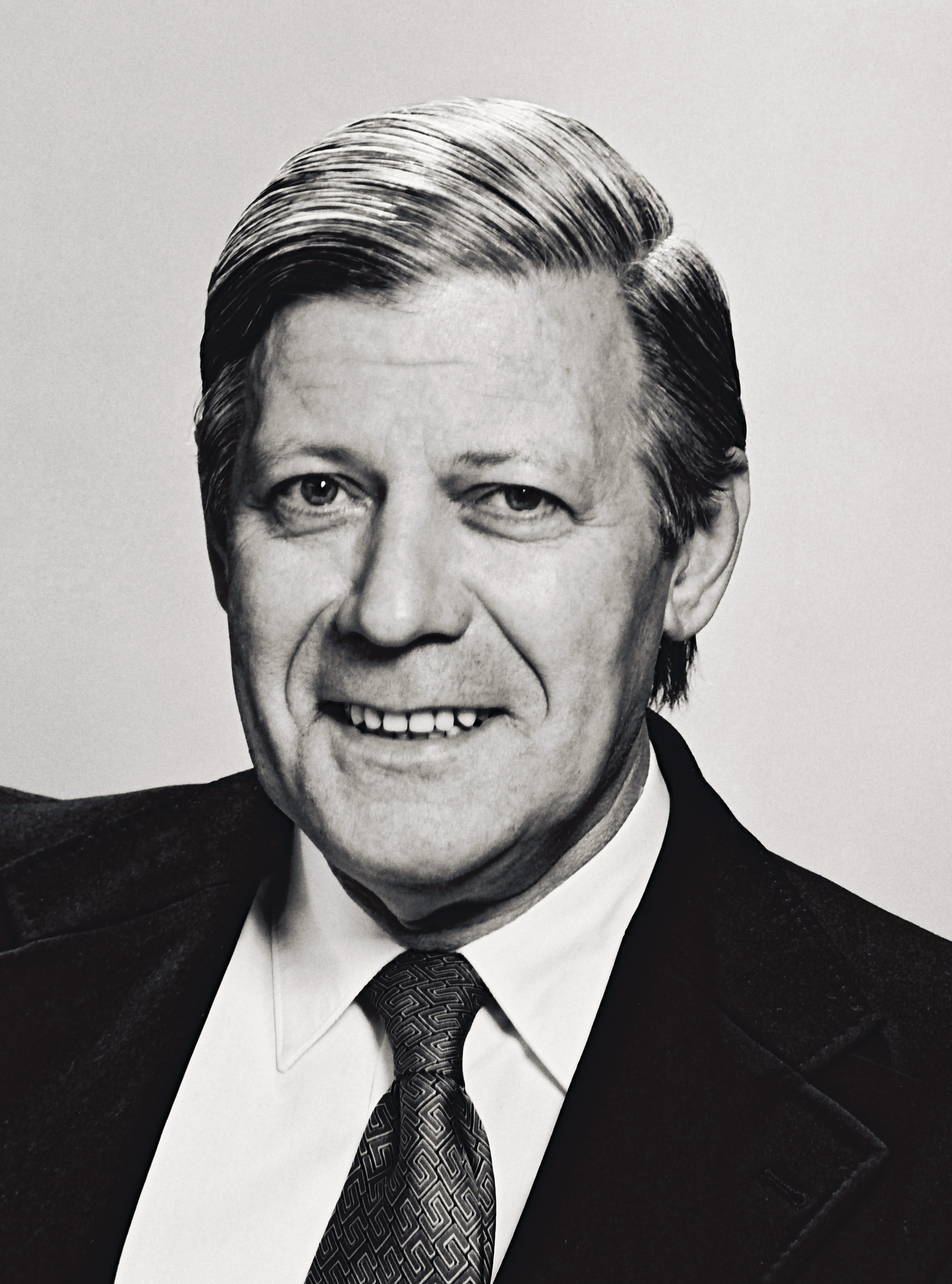
Helmut Schmidt

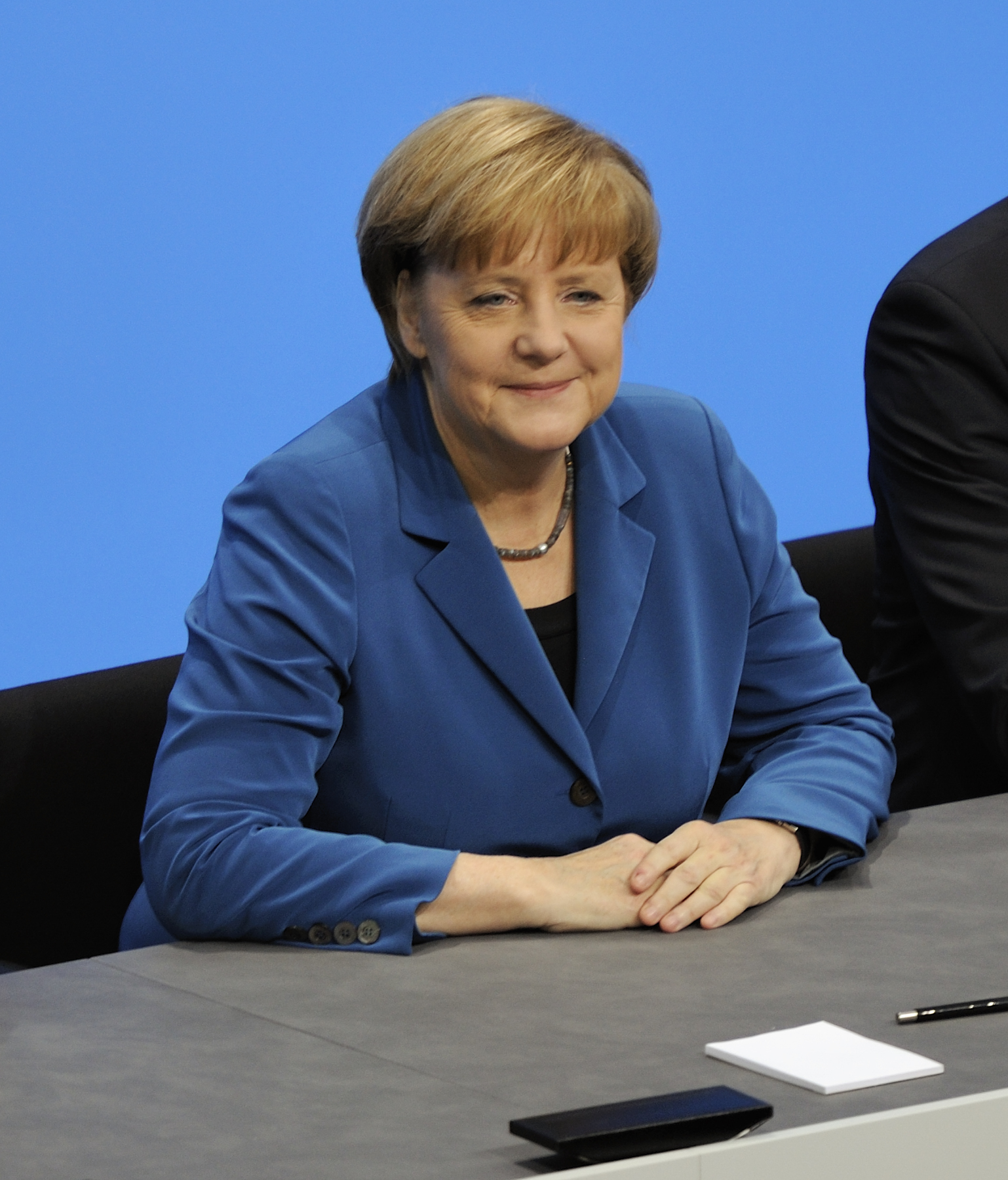
Angela Merkel

- Lucas Holstenius (1596–1661), German Catholic humanist, geographer, historian and librarian
- Andreas Schlüter (c. 1659 – c. 1714), German baroque sculptor and architect
- Barthold Heinrich Brockes (1680–1747), German poet
- Hermann Samuel Reimarus (1694–1768), German philosopher and writer of the Enlightenment
- Konrad Ekhof (1720–1778), the foremost German actor of the 18th century
- Johann Bernhard Basedow (1724–1790), German educational reformer, teacher and writer
- Meta Klopstock (1728–1758), writer
- Abel Seyler (1730–1800), one of the foremost theatre principals of 18th century Europe, who made Hamburg a center of theatrical innovation
- Marie Elizabeth de LaFite (1737–1794), German-born translator and author
- Johann Joachim Eschenburg (1743–1820), German critic and literary historian
- Johann Elert Bode (1747–1826), astronomer. He named and determined the orbit of Uranus.
- Johann Dominicus Fiorillo (1748–1821), German painter and historian of art
- Christian, Count of Stolberg-Stolberg (1748–1821), poet, brother of Frederick Leopold
- Friedrich Leopold Graf zu Stolberg-Stolberg (1750–1819), German lawyer and translator
- Georg Heinrich Sieveking (1751–1799), German merchant and follower of the Enlightenment
- Georg Friedrich von Martens (1756–1821), German jurist and diplomat
- Ludwig Erdwin Seyler (1758–1836), banker and politician
- Martin Hinrich Carl Lichtenstein (1780–1857), medical doctor, explorer, botanist and zoologist
- Karl Sieveking (1787–1847), Syndicus of Hamburg, diplomat, politician, patron of the arts and philanthropist
- Johann Franz Encke (1791–1865), astronomer. He measured the distance from Earth to the Sun.
- Ami Boué (1794–1881), geologist of French Huguenot origin
- Gustav Friedrich Waagen (1794–1868), German art historian
- Amalie Sieveking (1794–1859), German philanthropist and social activist
- Johann Christian Poggendorff (1796–1877), physicist. He dealt with electricity and magnetism.
- Matthias Jakob Schleiden (1804–1881), German botanist, co-founder of cell theory
- Samson Raphael Hirsch (1808–1888), Orthodox rabbi. He founded the Torah im Derech Eretz.
- Felix Mendelssohn (1809–1847), German composer, pianist, organist and conductor
- Ludwig Preller (1809–1861), German philologist and antiquarian
- Friedrich Gerstäcker (1816–1872), German traveler, writer and novelist
- Justus Ludwig Adolf Roth (1818–1892), German geologist and mineralogist
- Heinrich Barth (1821–1865), German explorer of Africa and a scholar
- Jacob Bernays (1824–1881), German philologist and philosophical writer
- Julius Oppert (1825–1905), French-German Assyriologist
- Thérèse Tietjens (1831–1877), leading opera and oratorio soprano
- Johannes Brahms (1833–1897), German composer, pianist and conductor
- Michael Bernays (1834–1897), German literary historian, scholar of Goethe and Shakespeare
- Wilhelm Rudolph Fittig (1835–1910), German chemist. He discovered the pinacol coupling reaction.
- Gustav Solomon Oppert (1836–1908), Indologist and professor
- Wilhelm Kühne (1837–1900), German physiologist. He coined the word "enzyme" in 1878.
- Adolf Mosengel (1837–1885), German painter
- Carl Rosa (1842–1889), musical impresario. He founded the Carl Rosa Opera Company in London.
- Carl Hagenbeck (1844–1913), a merchant of wild animals who supplied many European zoos
- Hans Hinrich Wendt (1853–1928), German Protestant theologian
- Hans von Bartels (1856–1913), German painter
- Heinrich Hertz (1857–1894), physicist who first proved the existence of electromagnetic waves
- Martha Voß-Zietz (1871–1961), conservative and women's rights activist
- Johannes Spieß (1888–1972), German U-boat commander during World War I
- Hans Albers (1891–1960), actor and one of the most popular German movie stars of the 20th century
- Kurt Sieveking (1897–1986), German Ambassador to Sweden 1951-53, First Mayor of Hamburg 1953-1957, and from 1956-57 served as the only President of the West German Bundesrat to serve two consecutive terms.
- Helmut Schmidt (1918–2015), politician and chancellor of West Germany from 1974 to 1982
- Else Baker (born 1935), Romani Holocaust survivor
- Marione Ingram (born 1935), Holocaust survivor, civil rights activist, author and artist
- Hark Bohm (1939–2025), actor, screenwriter and film director
- Angela Merkel (born 1954), retired politician and scientist, chancellor of Germany from 2005 to 2021
- Olaf Scholz (born 1958), politician, First Mayor of Hamburg from 2011 to 2018 and Chancellor of Germany from 2021 to 2025

== See also ==
- Novo Hamburgo
