= Eißendorf =

- Quarter of Hamburg
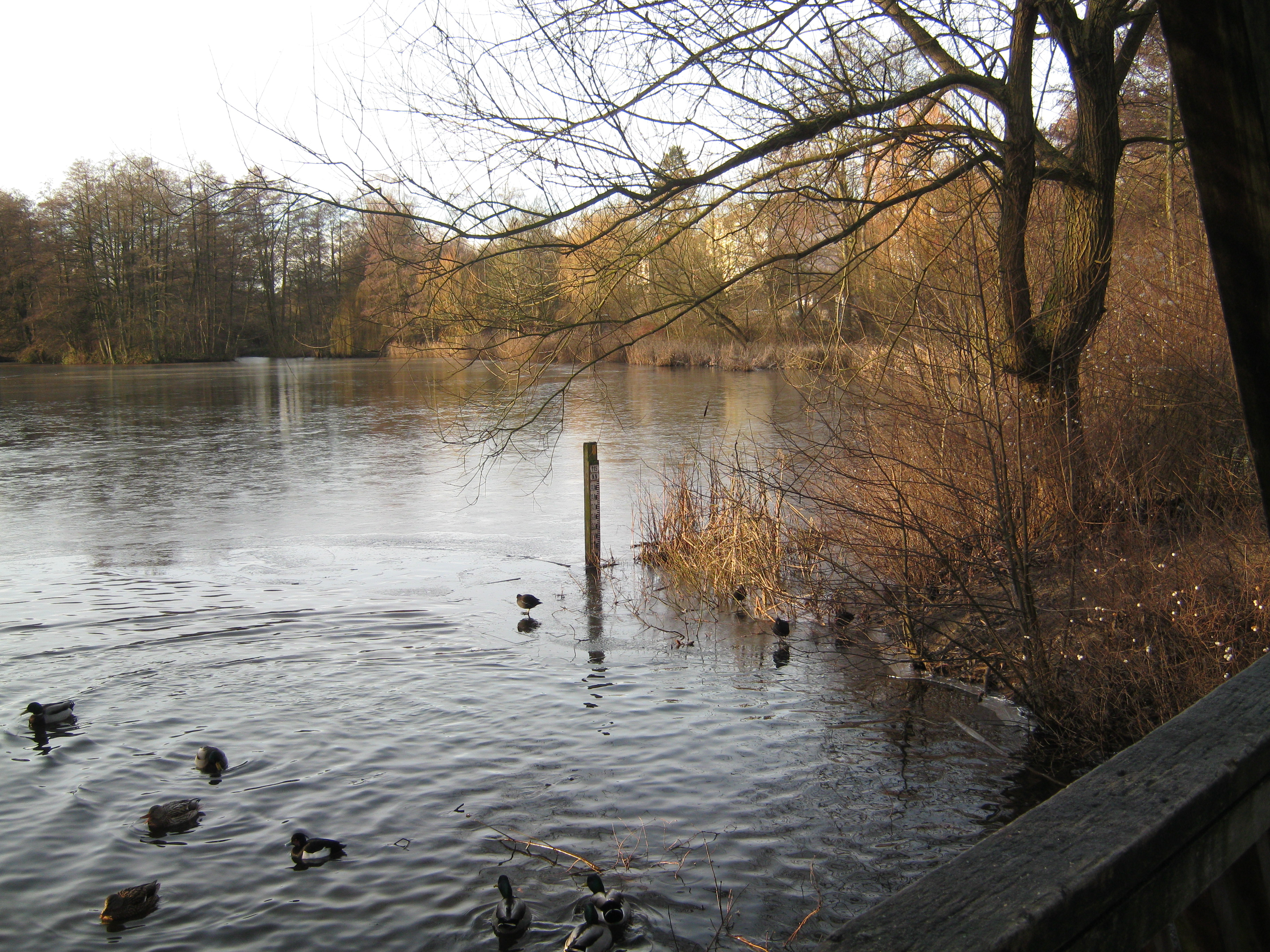
- Göhlbachtal in Eißendorf

- Location of Eißendorf in Hamburg
- Interactive map of Eißendorf
- Location within Germany Location within Hamburg
- Coordinates: 53.45583°N 9.95458°E
- Country: Germany
- State: Hamburg
- City: Hamburg
- Borough: Hamburg-Harburg

Area
  - Total: 8.4 km^{2} (3.2 sq mi)

Population (2024-12-31)
  - Total: 25,557
  - Density: 3,000/km^{2} (7,900/sq mi)
- Time zone: UTC+01:00 (CET)
  - Summer (DST): UTC+02:00 (CEST)
- Dialling codes: 040
- Vehicle registration: HH

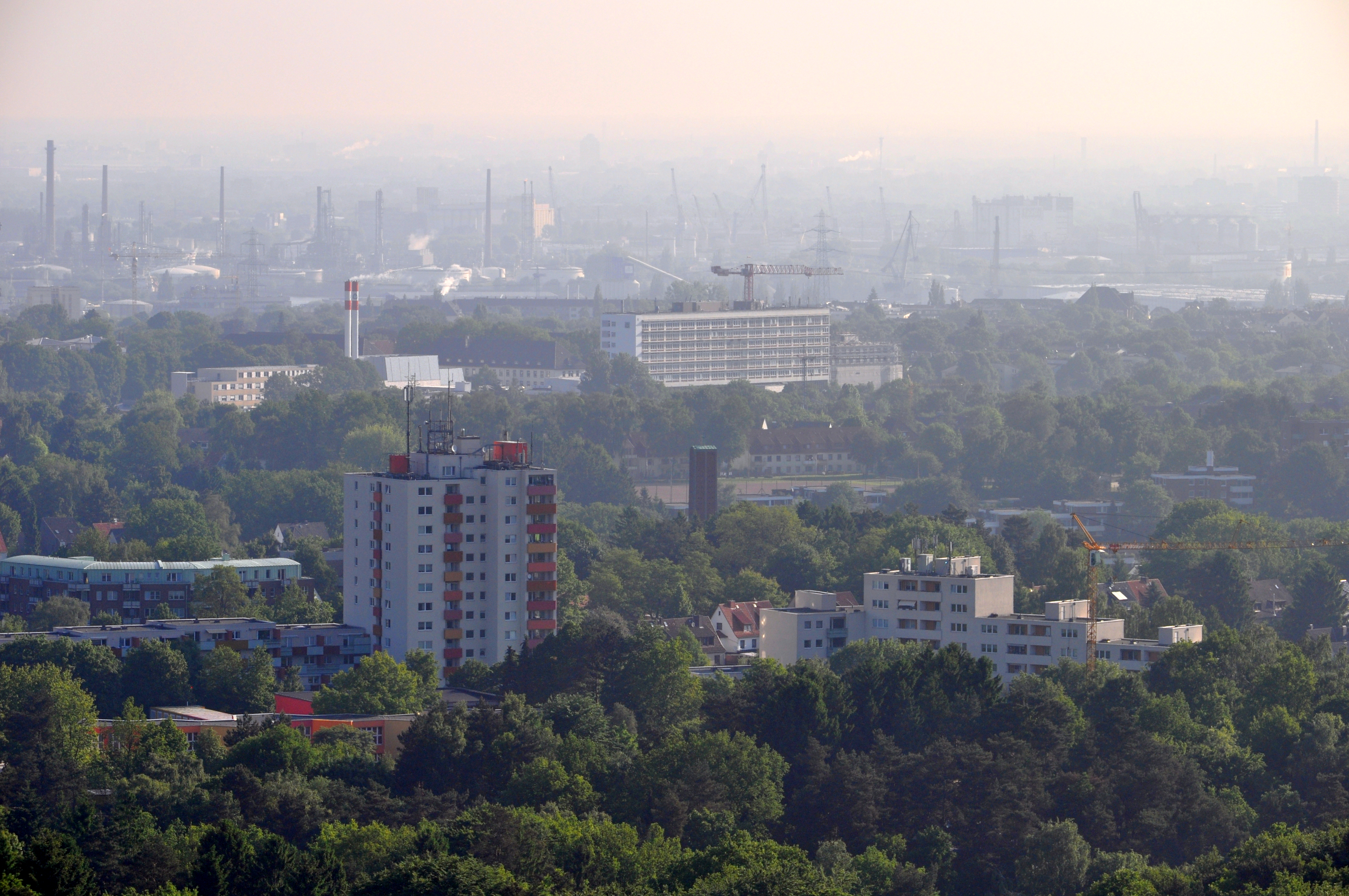
View over Eißendorf (front) and Heimfeld to Hamburg harbour

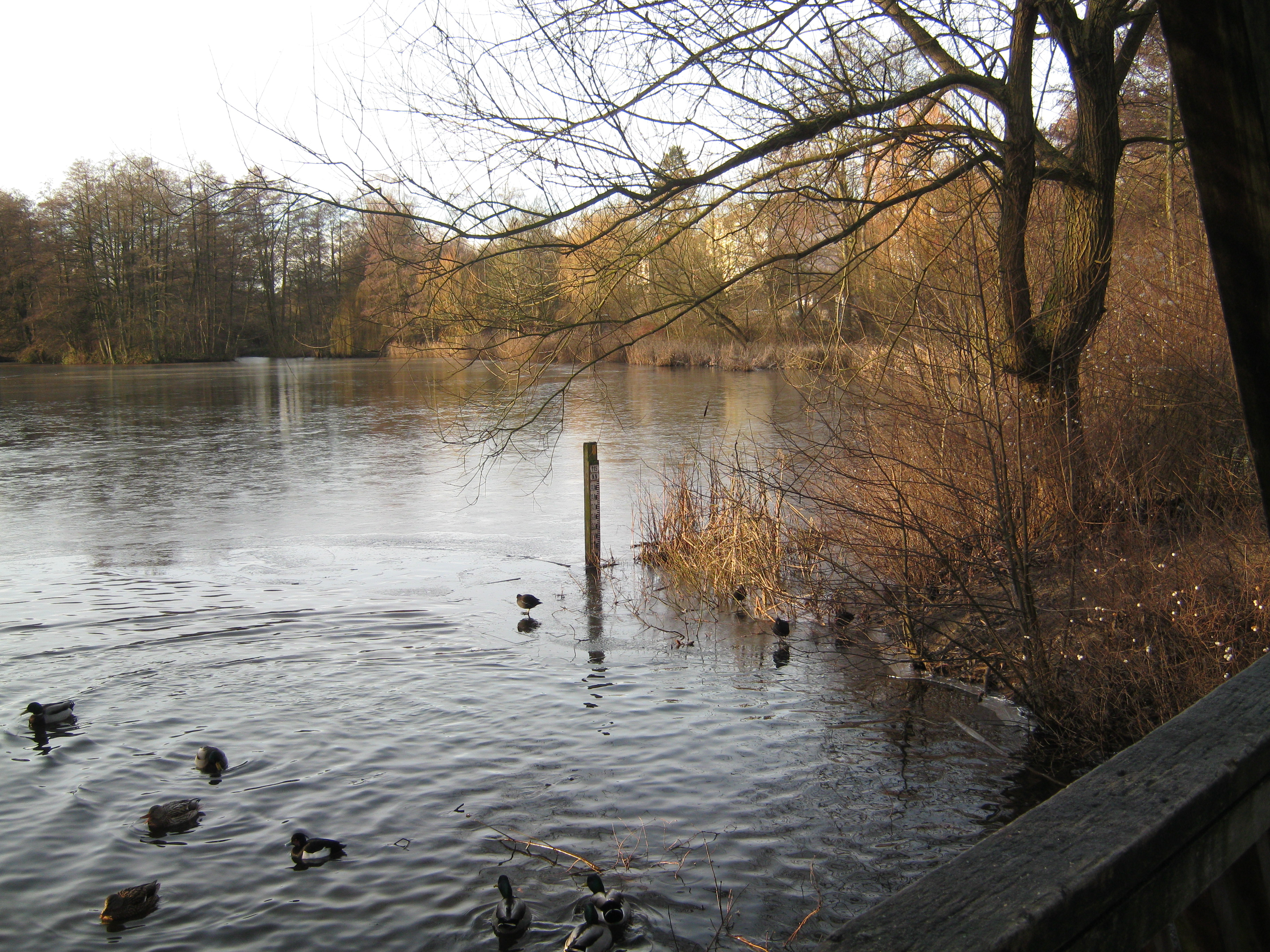
Göhlbachtal in Eißendorf

Eißendorf (German pronunciation: [ˈaɪsn̩dɔʁf]) is a quarter of Hamburg, Germany, in the borough of Harburg. More than 24,300 inhabitants live in an area of 8.4 km^{2}.

== Geography ==
Eißendorf borders the quarters of Heimfeld, Harburg, Wilstorf, and Marmstorf. Eißendorf is located in an undulating landscape at the northern edge of Harburg Hills. Its center, marked by the main road of Eißendorfer Straße, is situated in the valley of Göhlbachtal.

== History ==
In 1332/33, the former village of Eißendorf, in 1450 called Eytzen-dorpe, was first mentioned. Eißendorf has been a Haufendorf (lit. clustered village), probably named after its founding settler. Eißendorf belonged to Province of Hanover in Prussia, until the village was incorporated into Hamburg in 1937 by the Greater Hamburg Act, which came into force in 1938.

== Politics ==
These are the results of Eißendorf in the Hamburg state election:

Election	SPD	Greens	CDU	Left	FDP	AfD	Others
2020	42,3 %	19,2 %	11,4 %	8,4 %	8,3 %	4,3 %	6,1 %
2015	49,0 %	8,5 %	15,1 %	7,8 %	8,6 %	7,1 %	3,9 %
2011	51,7 %	7,2 %	22,2 %	6,3 %	–	6,0 %	6,6 %
2008	34,3 %	6,5 %	46,1 %	6,3 %	–	4,2 %	2,6 %
2004	30,5 %	7,4 %	51,4 %	–	–	2,5 %	8,3 %
2001	34,3 %	5,6 %	27,3 %	0,2 %	–	4,6 %	28,0 %
1997	42,0 %	9,5 %	33,6 %	0,2 %	–	2,5 %	12,2 %
1993	43,0 %	9,2 %	27,5 %	–	–	3,1 %	17,2 %
