= Gut Moor =

- Quarter of Hamburg
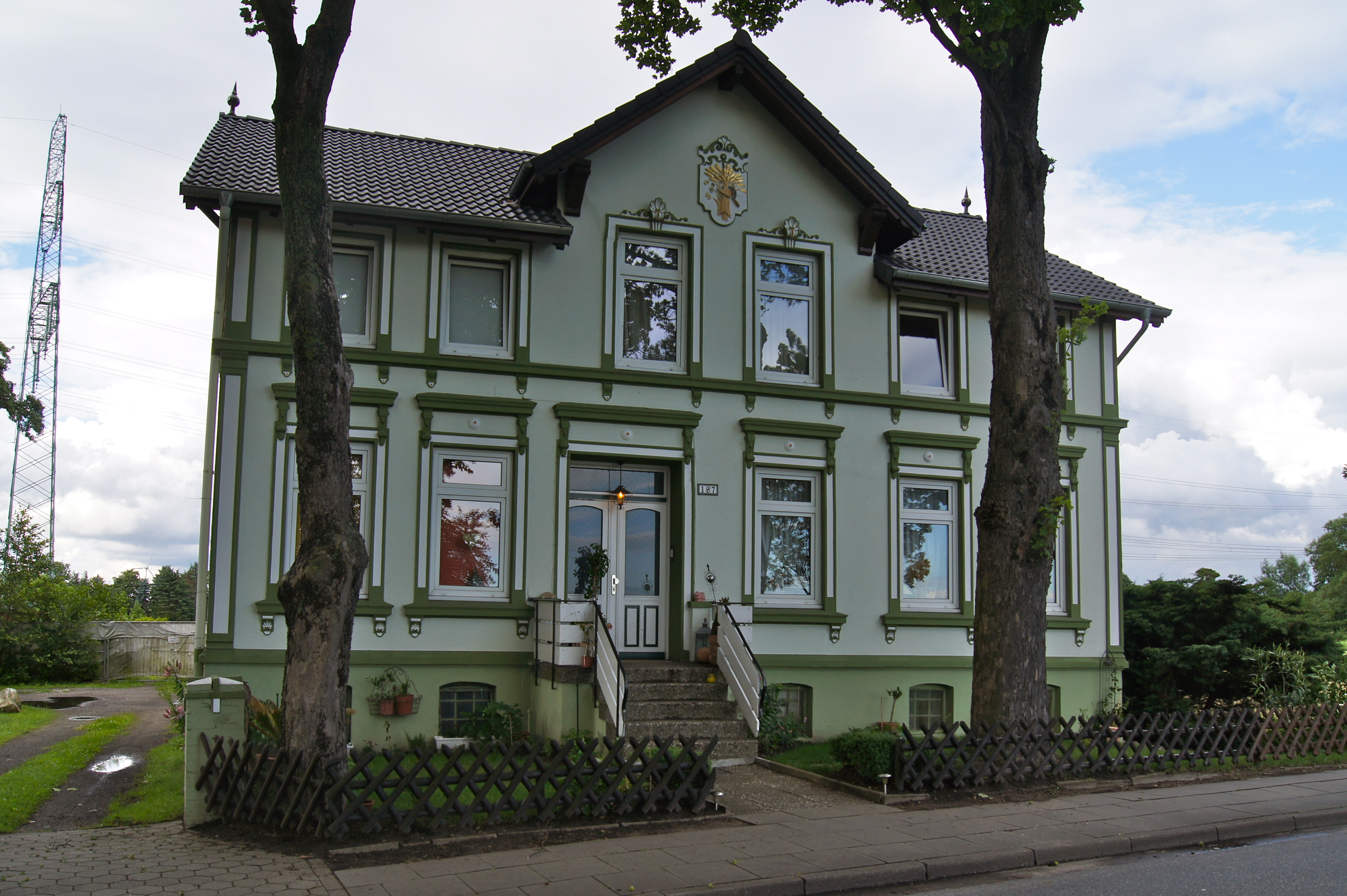
- House at the street of Großmoordamm

- Location of Gut Moor in Hamburg
- Interactive map of Gut Moor
- Location within Germany Location within Hamburg
- Coordinates: 53°26′27″N 10°0′55″E
- Country: Germany
- State: Hamburg
- City: Hamburg
- Borough: Harburg, Hamburg

Area
  - Total: 1.97 km^{2} (0.76 sq mi)

Population (2024-12-31)
  - Total: 148
  - Density: 75.1/km^{2} (195/sq mi)
- Time zone: UTC+01:00 (CET)
  - Summer (DST): UTC+02:00 (CEST)
- Postal codes: 21129
- Dialling codes: 040
- Vehicle registration: HH

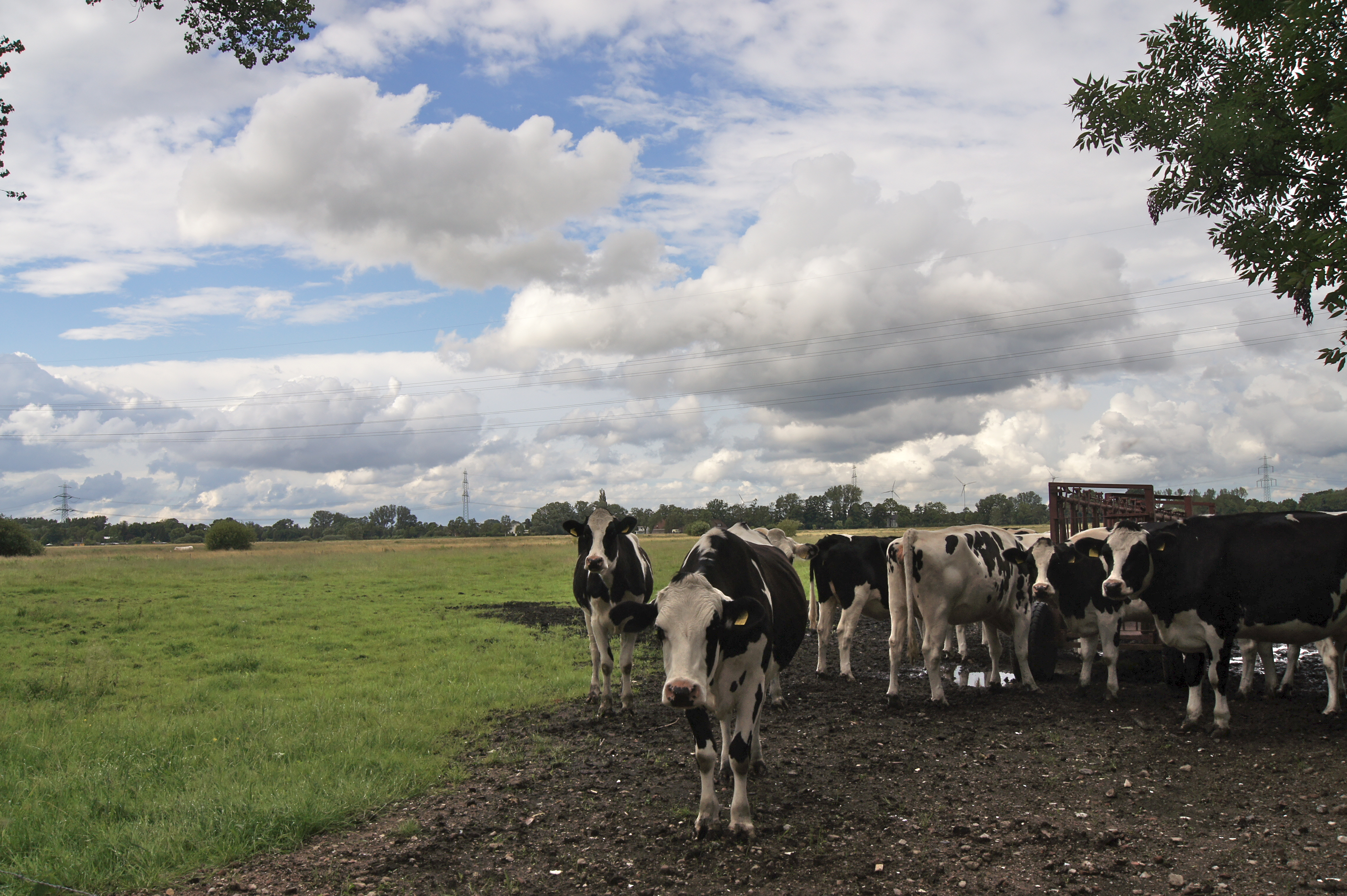
Cows near Chancellor's Yard

Gut Moor (German pronunciation: [ˈɡuːt ˈmoːɐ̯], lit. 'Manor Moor') is a quarter of Hamburg, Germany, in the borough of Harburg on its southeastern boundaries adjacent to Harburg district in Niedersachsen. It is one of the smallest quarters of Hamburg. 133 inhabitants lived in an area of 1.97 km^{2} in 2016.

== Geography ==
Gut Moor borders the quarters of Neuland, Harburg, Wilstorf, and Rönneburg. Gut Moor is located in the marshlands near the ancient Elbe valley (Elbe Urstromtal).

== History ==
In 1540, Otto I, Duke of Brunswick-Harburg, had his workers trench the canal of Seevekanal through the Meckelfeld moor to drain the area. Gut Moor was then named after a manor in the moor which William Augustus, Duke of Brunswick-Harburg bestowed his chancellor, Johann von Drebber, as an official residence here in 1630. So the domain of Kanzlershof (Chancellor's Yard) was created, which included parts of today's quarter. In 1713, a manor house was erected which was demolished in 1910, when the tracks of Harburg goods station were expanded.

Today, Gut Moor consists mainly of the main road of Großmoordamm. Buildings include some half-timbered houses with thatched roofs. But also the federal motorway Bundesautobahn 1 leads through the quarter.

== Politics ==
These are the results of Gut Moor and Neuland in the Hamburg state election:

State Election	SPD	AfD	CDU	Greens	Left	FDP	Others
2020	45,1 %	13,1 %	12,4 %	12,0 %	5,4 %	5,1 %	6,9 %
2015	47,4 %	11,5 %	20,5 %	4,2 %	4,4 %	8,0 %	4,0 %
2011	52,0 %	–	26,2 %	5,9 %	4,4 %	6,4 %	5,1 %
2008	36,7 %	–	47,2 %	6,4 %	4,4 %	3,4 %	1,8 %
2004	31,6 %	–	50,8 %	5,1 %	–	2,2 %	10,3 %
