= Heimfeld =

- Quarter of Hamburg
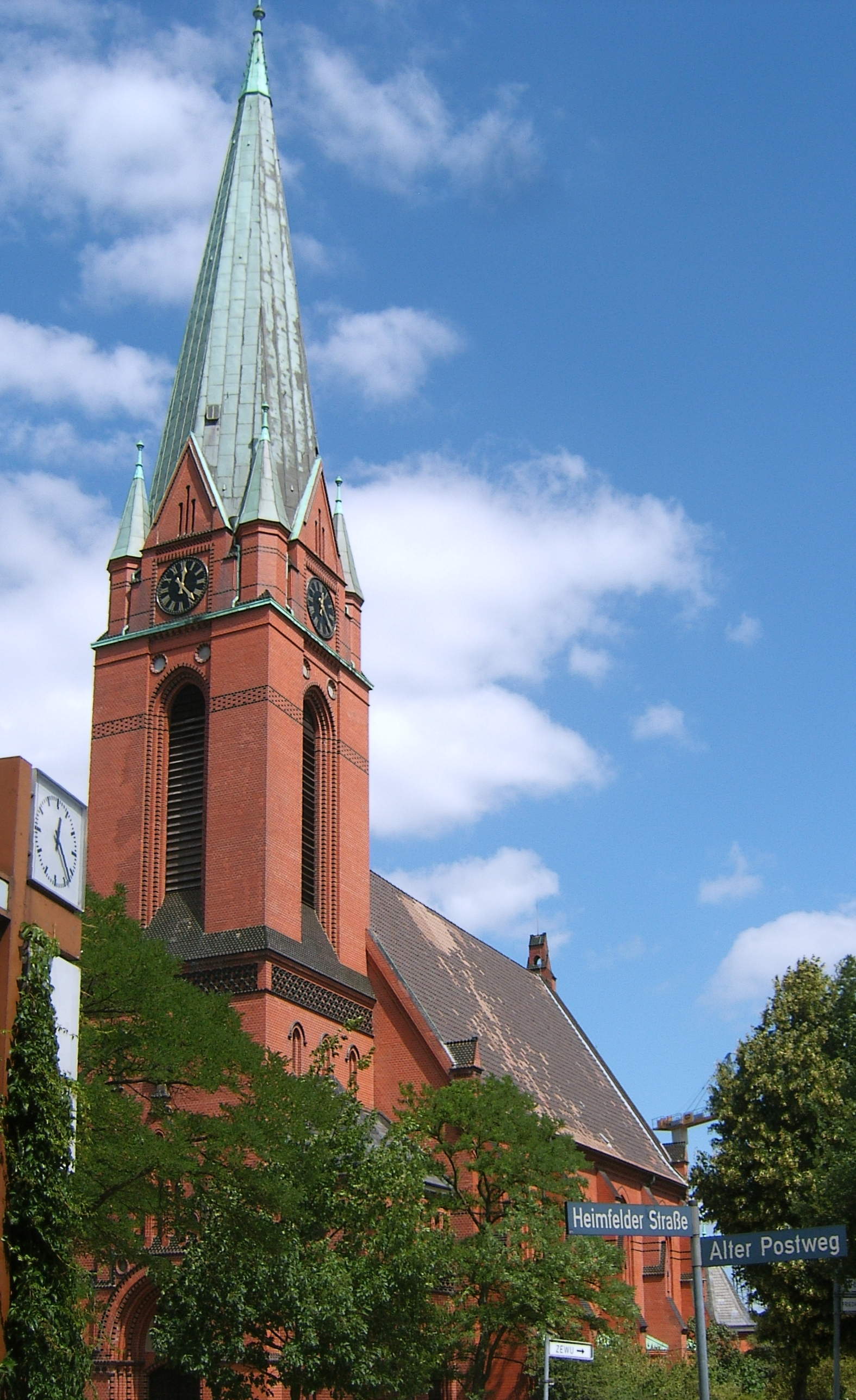
- At. Paulus Church

- Location of Heimfeld in Hamburg
- Interactive map of Heimfeld
- Location within Germany Location within Hamburg
- Coordinates: 53.464014°N 9.956239°E
- Country: Germany
- State: Hamburg
- City: Hamburg
- Borough: Hamburg-Harburg

Area
  - Total: 11.7 km^{2} (4.5 sq mi)

Population (2024-12-31)
  - Total: 22,995
  - Density: 1,970/km^{2} (5,090/sq mi)
- Time zone: UTC+01:00 (CET)
  - Summer (DST): UTC+02:00 (CEST)
- Dialling codes: 040
- Vehicle registration: HH

Heimfeld (German pronunciation: [ˈhaɪmfɛlt]) is a quarter of Hamburg, Germany in the Harburg borough.

== Geography ==
Heimfeld borders the quarters Hausbruch, Moorburg, Harburg, and Eißendorf. In the southwest it borders Lower Saxony.

== Politics ==
These are the results of Heimfeld in the Hamburg state election:

| Election | SPD | Greens | Left | CDU | AfD | FDP | Others |
|---|---|---|---|---|---|---|---|
| 2020 | 36,5 % | 25,1 % | 12,4 % | 8,3 % | 5,7 % | 3,9 % | 8,1 % |
| 2015 | 42,9 % | 13,0 % | 11,3 % | 12,5 % | 8,5 % | 6,2 % | 7,4 % |
| 2011 | 48,4 % | 11,5 % | 8,4 % | 19,5 % | – | 4,5 % | 7,6 % |
| 2008 | 37,7 % | 10,0 % | 8,2 % | 36,9 % | – | 4,1 % | 3,0 % |

== Transportation ==
Heimfeld has its own S-Bahn railway station as well as a bus stop both operated by Hamburger Verkehrsverbund. Heimfeld can be reached from the Hamburg central railway stations through S-Bahn line S3 and S31 in the direction of Stade or Neugraben . At the same time bus number 142 can be taken from Harburg Bus Station in the direction of AK Harburg.
