= Francop =

- Quarter of Hamburg
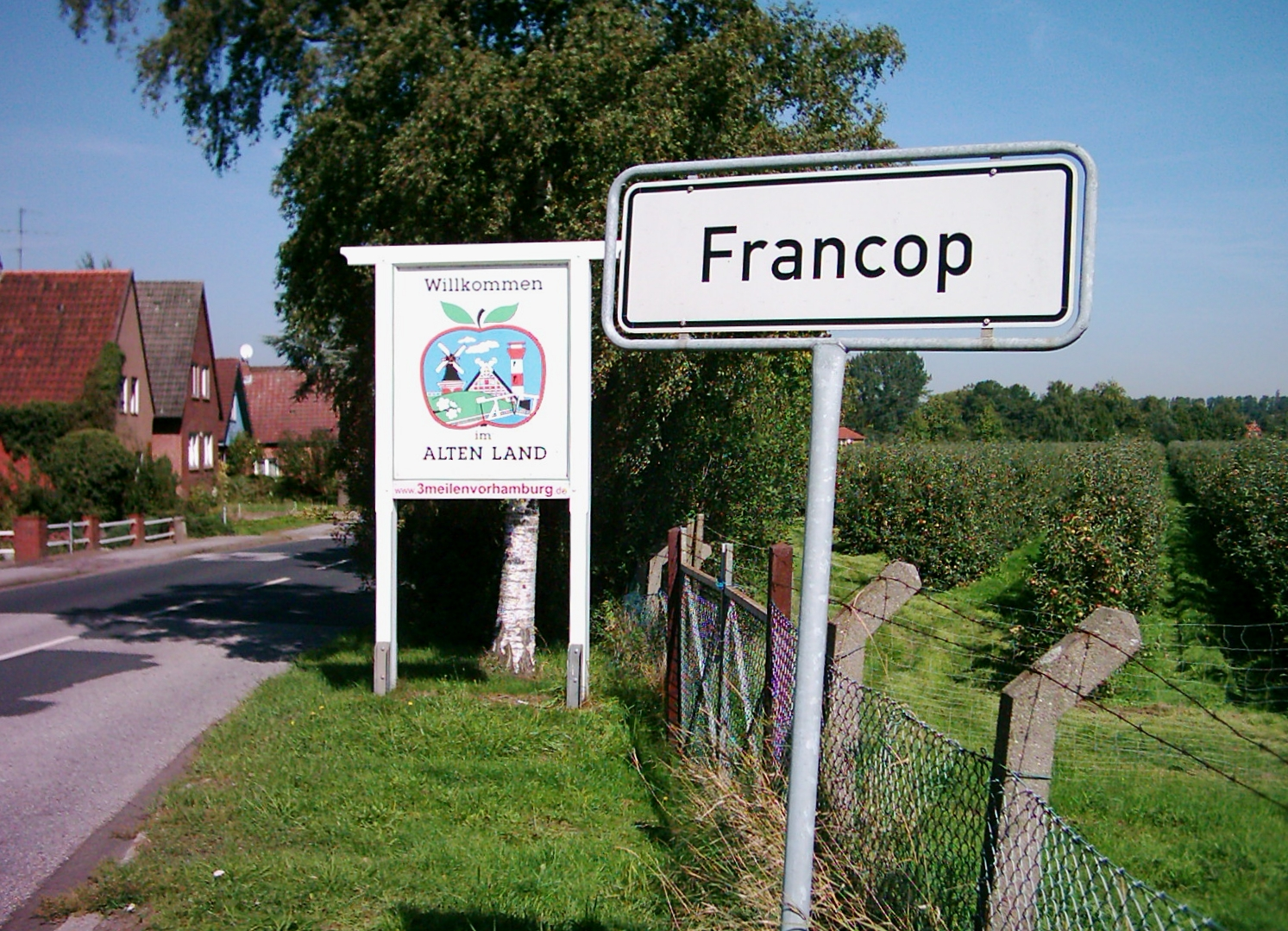

- Location of Francop within Hamburg
- Interactive map of Francop
- Location within Germany Location within Hamburg
- Coordinates: 53°30′00″N 9°51′00″E
- Country: Germany
- State: Hamburg
- City: Hamburg
- Borough: Harburg, Hamburg

Area
  - Total: 9.1 km^{2} (3.5 sq mi)

Population (2024-12-31)
  - Total: 749
  - Density: 82/km^{2} (210/sq mi)
- Time zone: UTC+01:00 (CET)
  - Summer (DST): UTC+02:00 (CEST)
- Dialling codes: 040
- Vehicle registration: HH

Francop (German pronunciation: [ˈfʁaŋkoːp]) is a quarter in the Harburg borough of the Free and Hanseatic city of Hamburg in northern Germany. In 2020 the population was 711.

== History ==
Francop, probably founded in the mid-12th century, belonged - as to its government - to the Prince-Archbishopric of Bremen, established in 1180. In religious respect, however, Francop formed part of the Roman Catholic Diocese of Verden until after 1566 its incumbent bishops lost papal recognition, except of a last Catholic bishop from 1630 to 1631, respectively. In 1648 the Prince-Archbishopric was transformed into the Duchy of Bremen, which was first ruled in personal union by the Swedish and from 1715 on by the Hanoverian Crown. In 1823 the Duchy was abolished and its territory became part of the Stade Region. In 1932 Francop and other villages East of the Este were annexed to the County of Harburg in the then Lunenburg Region. By the Greater Hamburg Act of 1937 Francop was annexed to Hamburg state, and municipally integrated into the unity municipality of Hamburg (Einheitsgemeinde Hamburg) on 1 April 1938.

== Geography ==
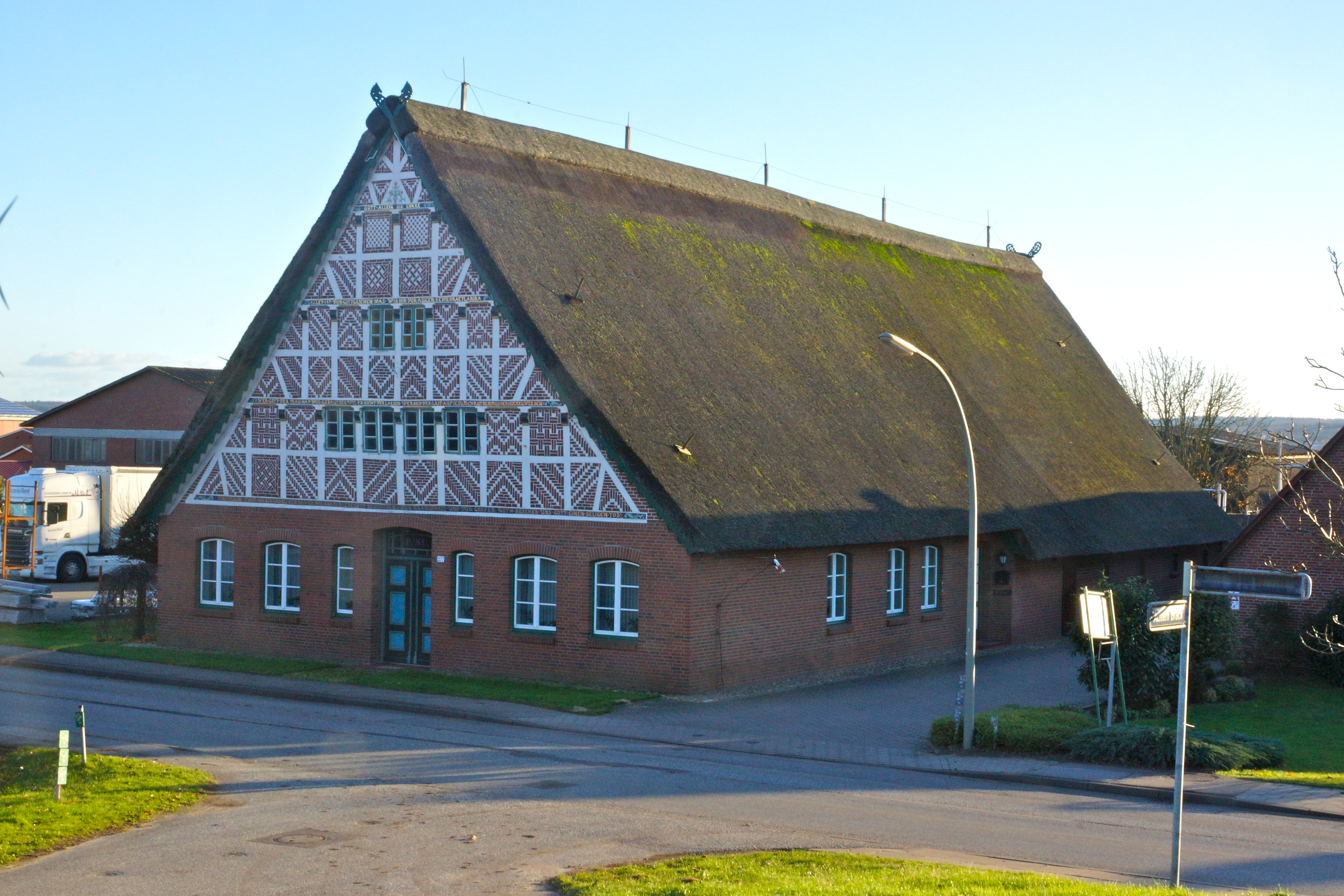
Timber framed farm – the oldest house in Francop (17th century)

In 2008 according to the statistical office of Hamburg and Schleswig-Holstein, the quarter has a total area of 9.1 km^{2}. Francop is part of the Altes Land region (old country or old land). In the north is the quarter Finkenwerder of the borough Hamburg-Mitte, in the east is the quarter Altenwerder, Moorburg, and Hausbruch. Francop borders in the south to Neugraben-Fischbek and in the west to Neuenfelde.

== Demographics ==
In 2008 634 people were living in the Francop quarter. The population density was 70/km^{2} (181/sq mi). 17.1% were children under the age of 18, 19.4% were 65 years of age or older, and 3.3% were immigrants. 15 people were registered as unemployed.

In 1999, there were 322 households, out of which 24.8% had children under the age of 18 living with them, and 34.8% of all households were made up of individuals. The average household size was 2.3.

Population by year

1987	1988	1989	1990	1991	1992	1993	1994	1995	1996	1997	1998	1999
725	737	732	748	753	740	719	707	721	701	713	721	721

2000	2001	2002	2003	2004	2005	2006	2007	2008
726	698	704	701	674	662	639	636	634

== Politics ==
These are the results of Francop in the Hamburg state election:

Election	SPD	CDU	Greens	AfD	Left	FDP	Others
2020	46,5 %	24,2 %	10,3 %	6,0 %	3,2 %	3,1 %	6,7 %
2015	41,0 %	26,3 %	6,1 %	4,3 %	6,0 %	13,9 %	2,4 %
2011	45,4 %	31,5 %	4,5 %	–	1,5 %	13,7 %	3,4 %
2008	25,9 %	59,3 %	4,5 %	–	3,1 %	5,5 %	1,7 %
2004	23,5 %	59,3 %	6,6 %	–	–	3,7 %	6,9 %
2001	23,0 %	38,1 %	5,2 %	–	0,3 %	9,0 %	24,4 %
1997	36,8 %	35,8 %	9,0 %	–	0,0 %	4,7 %	13,7 %
1993	38,7 %	36,4 %	6,6 %	–	–	5,9 %	12,4 %
1991	43,2 %	46,2 %	3,6 %	–	0,0 %	3,0 %	4,0 %
1987	39,7 %	52,4 %	3,2 %	–	–	4,5 %	0,2 %
1986	35,3 %	52,9 %	6,3 %	–	–	4,0 %	1,5 %
Dec. 1982	38,8 %	52,8 %	5,6 %	–	–	2,8 %	0,0 %
Jun. 1982	32,1 %	56,5 %	8,1 %	–	–	2,8 %	0,5 %
1978	42,6 %	49,6 %	1,5 %	–	–	4,9 %	1,4 %
1974	34,9 %	52,0 %	–	–	–	11,7 %	1,4 %
1970	44,7 %	41,2 %	–	–	–	7,8 %	6,3 %
1966	39,5 %	48,4 %	–	–	–	7,1 %	5,0 %

== Notes ==
=== References ===
- Statistical office Hamburg and Schleswig-Holstein Statistisches Amt für Hamburg und Schleswig-Holstein, official website (in German)
