= Cranz, Hamburg =

Cranz
- Quarter of Hamburg
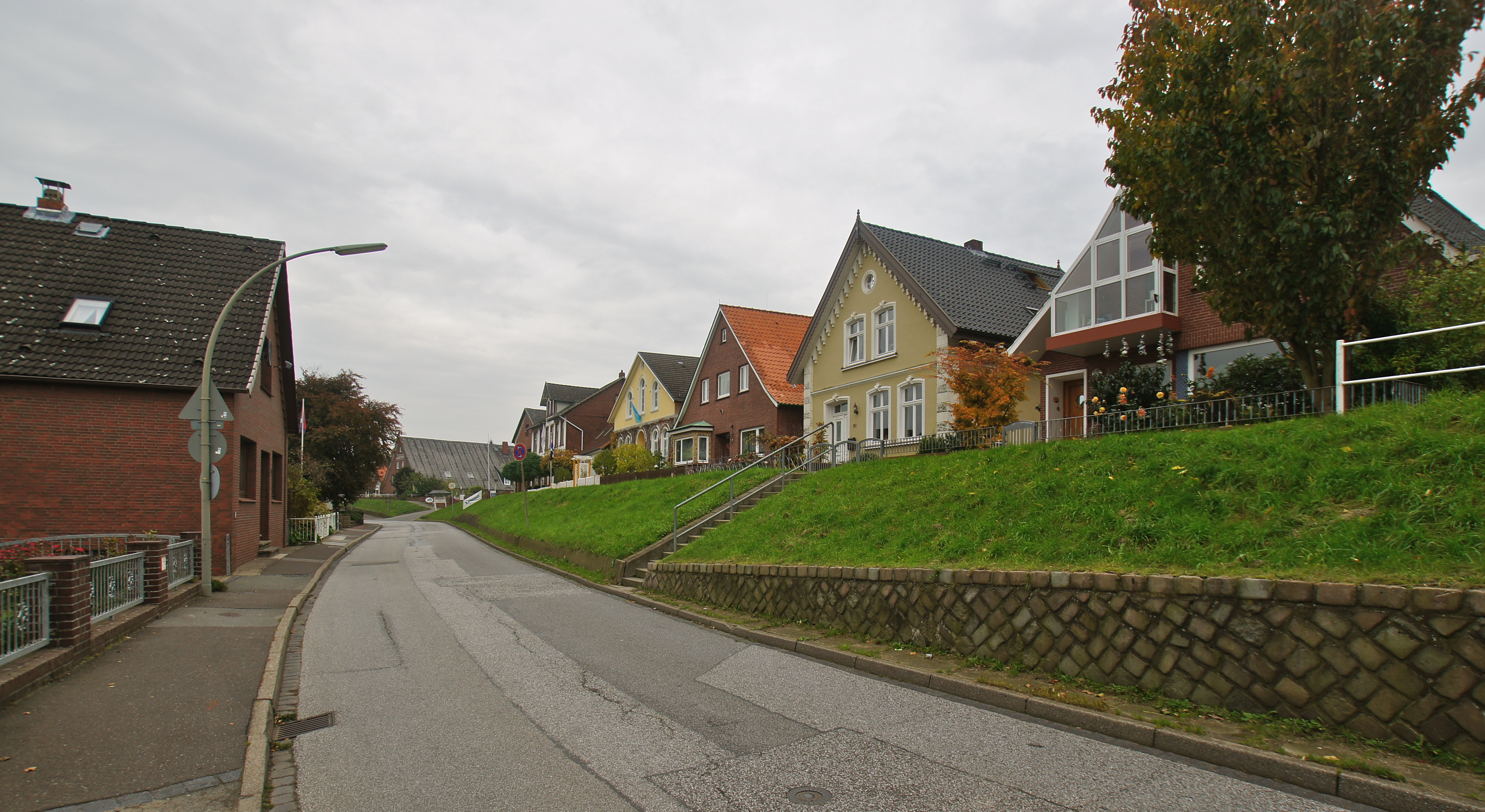
- Estedeich in 2012

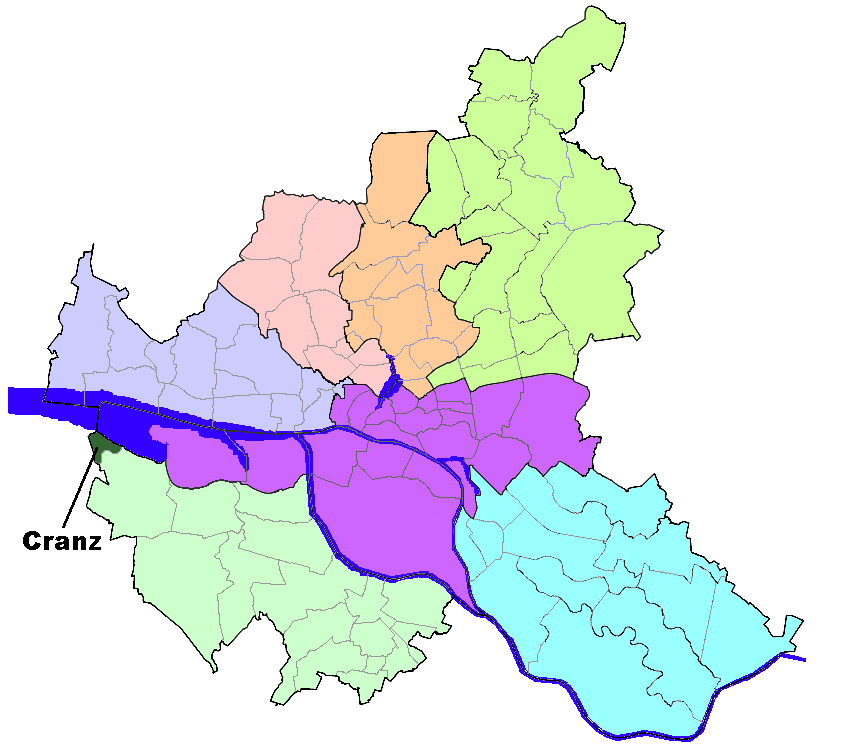
- Location of Cranz in Hamburg
- Interactive map of Cranz
- Location within Germany Location within Hamburg
- Coordinates: 53°32′13″N 9°46′50″E
- Country: Germany
- State: Hamburg
- City: Hamburg
- Borough: Harburg, Hamburg

Area
  - Total: 1.3 km^{2} (0.50 sq mi)

Population (2024-12-31)
  - Total: 858
  - Density: 660/km^{2} (1,700/sq mi)
- Time zone: UTC+01:00 (CET)
  - Summer (DST): UTC+02:00 (CEST)
- Dialling codes: 040
- Vehicle registration: HH

Cranz (German pronunciation: [kʁants]) is a quarter in the Harburg borough of Hamburg, Germany. It is on the left bank of the Elbe river and one of the 104 quarters of Hamburg. In 2020 the population was 843.

== History ==
Cranz belonged - as to its government - to the Prince-Archbishopric of Bremen, established in 1180. In religious respect, however, Cranz formed part of the Roman Catholic Diocese of Verden until after 1566 its incumbent bishops lost papal recognition, except of a last Catholic bishop from 1630 to 1631, respectively. In 1648 the Prince-Archbishopric was transformed into the Duchy of Bremen, which was first ruled in personal union by the Swedish and from 1715 on by the Hanoverian Crown. In 1823 the Duchy was abolished and its territory became part of the Stade Region of the Kingdom of Hanover, which was annexed by the Kingdom of Prussia in 1866. By the Greater Hamburg Act of 1937 Francop was annexed to Hamburg state, and municipally integrated into the unity municipality of Hamburg (Einheitsgemeinde Hamburg) on 1 April 1938.

== Geography ==
In 2006 according to the statistical office of Hamburg and Schleswig-Holstein, the quarter Cranz has a total area of 1.3 km^{2}. It is a rural area and part of the region Altes Land. In the south is the state of Lower Saxony. In the north is the river Elbe and the eastern border is to Neuenfelde quarter.

== Demographics ==
In 2006 in the quarter Cranz were living 857 people. The population density was 643/km^{2} (1,665/sq mi). 18.6% were children under the age of 18, and 16.7% were 65 years of age or older. 15.4% were resident aliens. 31 people were registered as unemployed. In 1999 there were 424 households, out of which 21.7% had children under the age of 18 living with them and 38.9% of all households were made up of individuals. The average household size was 2.09.

In 2006 there were 67 criminal offences in Cranz (87 crimes per 1000 people).

There is one elementary school and no secondary school in the quarter Cranz, there are 2 physicians in private practice and no pharmacy.

== Politics ==
The 2025 results include the Stadtteile Cranz, Altenwerder, and Moorburg.

These are the results of Cranz in the Hamburg state election:

Election	SPD	CDU	AfD	Greens	Left	FDP	Others
2025	31.1 %	24.7 %	12.6 %	11.1 %	8.0 %	2.2 %	7.3 %
2020	42.4 %	9.7 %	5.2 %	29.1 %	3.8 %	3.6 %	6.2 %
2015	54.2 %	11.5 %	2.0 %	15.1 %	6.7 %	8.1 %	2.4 %
2011	46.2 %	21.6 %	–	14.6 %	5.3 %	7.2 %	5.1 %
2008	37.0 %	43.9 %	–	6.6 %	4.6 %	7.3 %	0.7 %
2004	32.3 %	49.3 %	–	7.9 %	–	3.8 %	6.7 %
2001	37.3 %	27.2 %	–	4.9 %	0.3 %	6.1 %	24.1 %
1997	42.0 %	30.0 %	–	9.5 %	0.0 %	4.2 %	14.3 %
1993	48.1 %	22.8 %	–	7.5 %	–	5.6 %	16.0 %

== Transportation ==
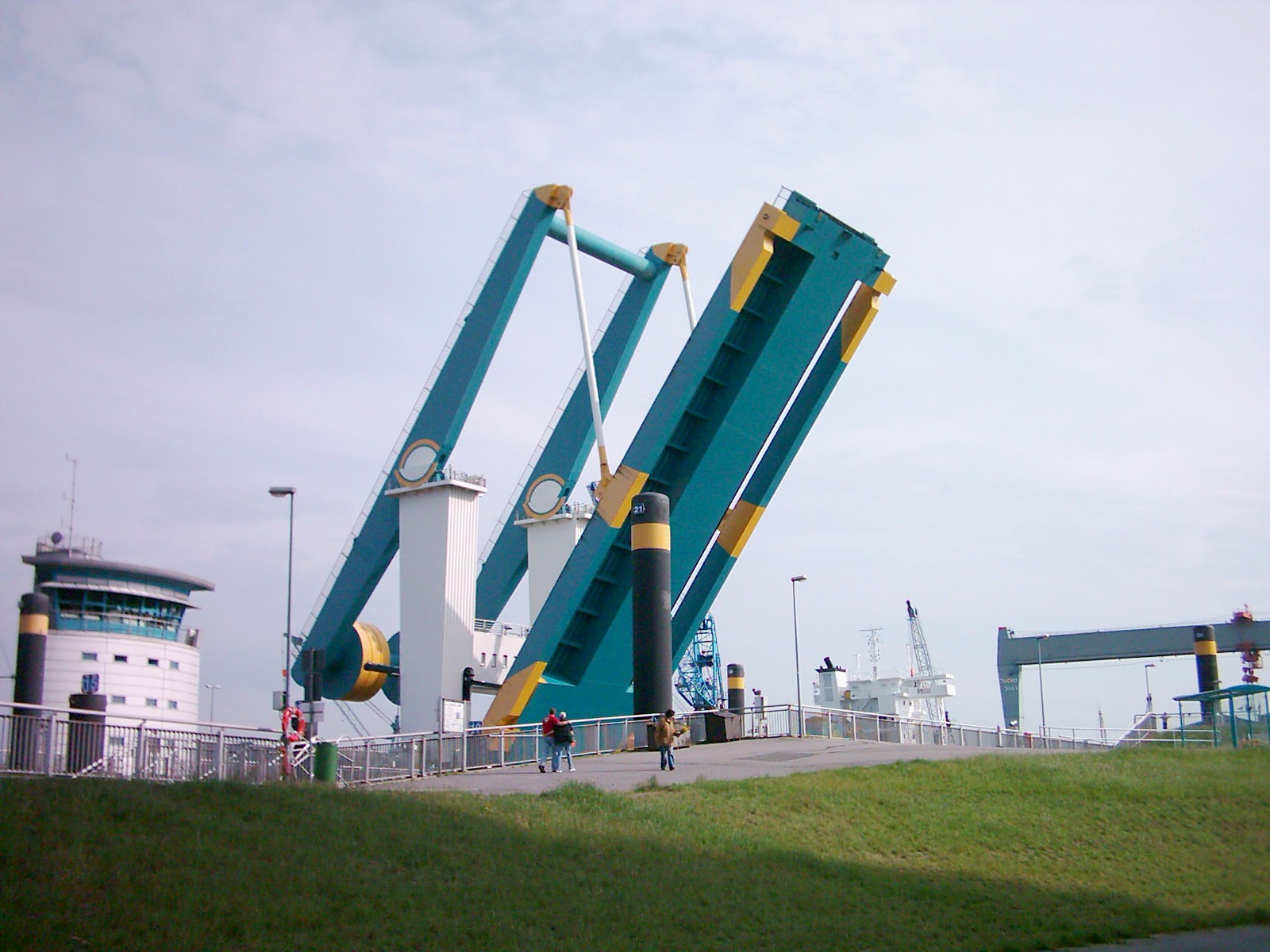
Bascule bridge at the Este flood barrage

Cranz is not serviced by the rapid transit system of the S-Bahn. According to the Department of Motor Vehicles (Kraftfahrt-Bundesamt), in the quarter were 365 private cars registered (456 cars/1000 people).

The flood barrage was built after the North Sea flood of 1962 to protect the Este river to the floods on the river Elbe.

== Notes ==
=== References ===
- Statistical office Hamburg and Schleswig-Holstein Statistisches Amt für Hamburg und Schleswig-Holstein, official website (in German).
