= Neuenfelde =

- Quarter of Hamburg
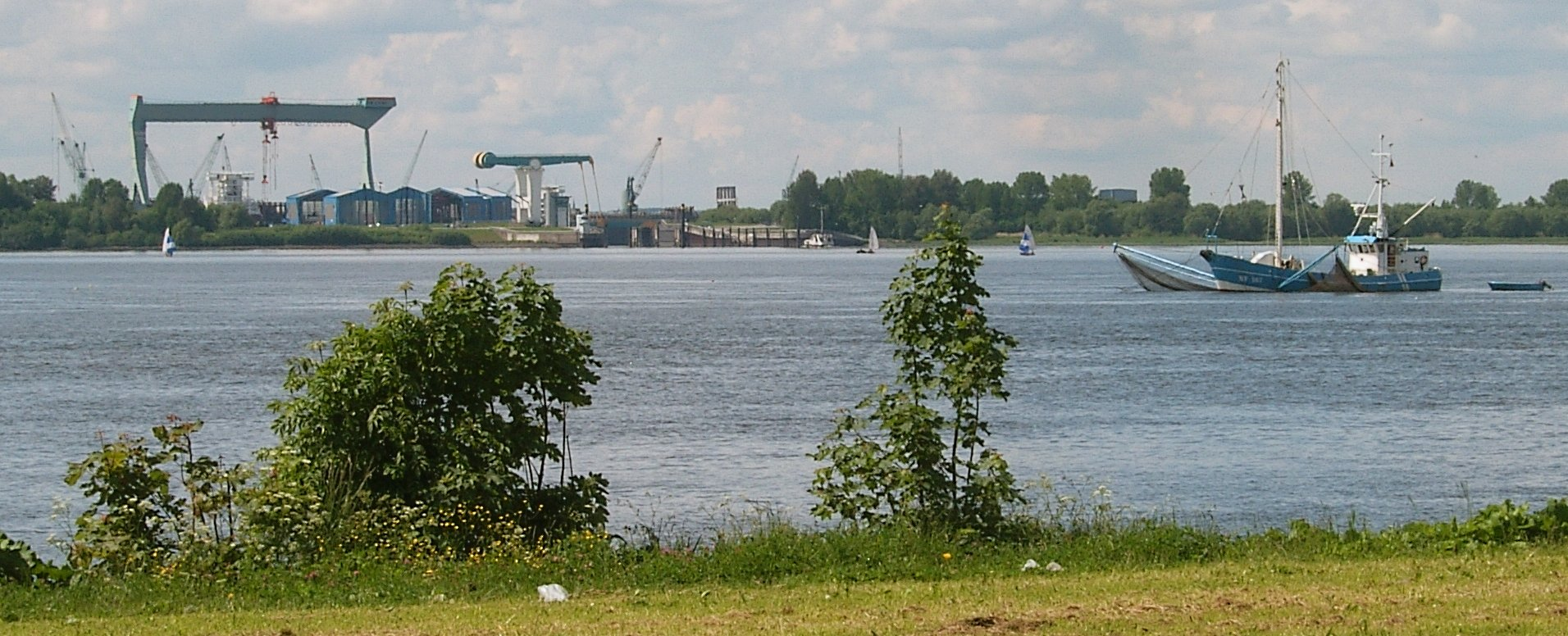
- View over the Elbe river to Neuenfelde

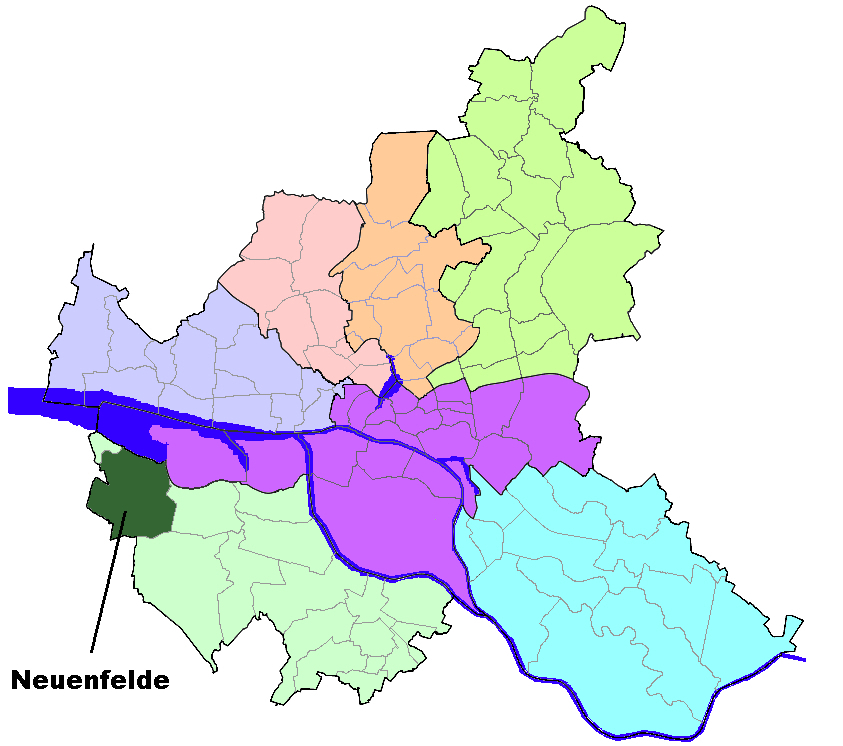
- Location of Neuenfelde in Hamburg
- Interactive map of Neuenfelde
- Location within Germany Location within Hamburg
- Coordinates: 53°30′53″N 9°47′44″E
- Country: Germany
- State: Hamburg
- City: Hamburg
- Borough: Harburg

Area
  - Total: 15.5 km^{2} (6.0 sq mi)

Population (2024-12-31)
  - Total: 5,314
  - Density: 343/km^{2} (888/sq mi)
- Time zone: UTC+01:00 (CET)
  - Summer (DST): UTC+02:00 (CEST)
- Dialling codes: 040
- Vehicle registration: HH

Neuenfelde (German pronunciation: [nɔʏənˈfɛldə]) is a rural quarter located in the borough Harburg of Hamburg, Germany near the Lower Saxony border. The quarter is well known for its quality of fruit and unique houses, many of which prove to be popular attractions for tourists passing through, it belongs to the Altes Land region and is quite known for the cherry and apple tree blossom. In 2020 the population was 4,883.

== History ==
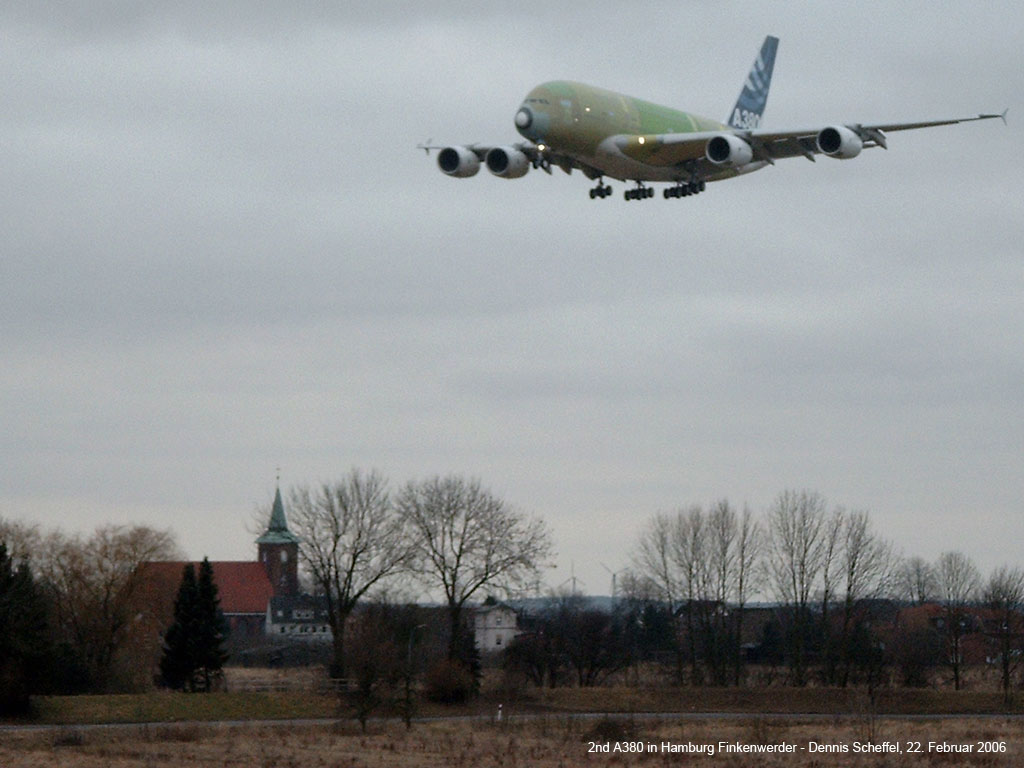
An A380 landing at Finkenwerder airport, with the local church below

Neuenfelde as Nincop was first mentioned in 1257 as a village of Dutch settlers. In 1937 due to the Greater Hamburg Act Neuenfelde became a part of Hamburg.

The survival of the settlement is currently under threat from the nearby Airbus factory and its airport. Over the past few years, Airbus extended their runway towards Neuenfelde. This upset local residents, many of whom have had to sell their properties in order to accommodate these plans. Another source of upset was the planned relocation of the local St. Pankratius church, home to a historic Baroque organ built by Arp Schnitger. On July 16, 2007 the new longer runway started operations.

== Geography ==
In 2006 according to the statistical office of Hamburg and Schleswig-Holstein, the quarter Neuenfelde has a total area of 15.5 km^{2} (6 sq mi). Neuenfelde is part of the region Altes Land. The quarter borders in the North to the river Elbe and the Finkenwerder quarter of the borough of Hamburg-Mitte. In the West is the small quarter Cranz and the district of Stade of Lower Saxony In the south is the Neugraben-Fischbek quarter and the eastern bordern is to the quarter Francop. The settlement Neuenfelde consists of two main streets; Nincoper Straße and Arp-Schnitger-Steig, the latter populated by the majority of the town's commercial activity, notably a kindergarten, school, fire brigade, restaurant, pharmacy and a hair salon. Bordering the settlement is Hasselwerder Straße and Marschkamper Deich.

== Demographics ==
In 2006 in the quarter of Neuenfelde lived 4,614 people. The population density was 298 inhabitants per square kilometre (772/sq mi). 22.2% were children under the age of 18, and 14.9% were 65 years of age or older. 25.3% were resident aliens. 199 people were registered as unemployed.

In 1999 there were 2,026 households and 26.5% of all households were made up of individuals.

There were 1 elementary school and no secondary school in the quarter Neuenfelde and 2 physicians in private practice and no pharmacy.

== Transportation ==
The quarter is not serviced by the rapid transit system of S- or U-Bahn, however public transport to the city is provided by the bus no. 257 to Neugraben, as well as the bus no. 150 to Altona. According to the Department of Motor Vehicles (Kraftfahrt-Bundesamt), in the quarter Neuenfelde were 2,001 private cars registered (429 cars/1000 people).

== Notable buildings ==
- St. Pankratius-Kirche, local church
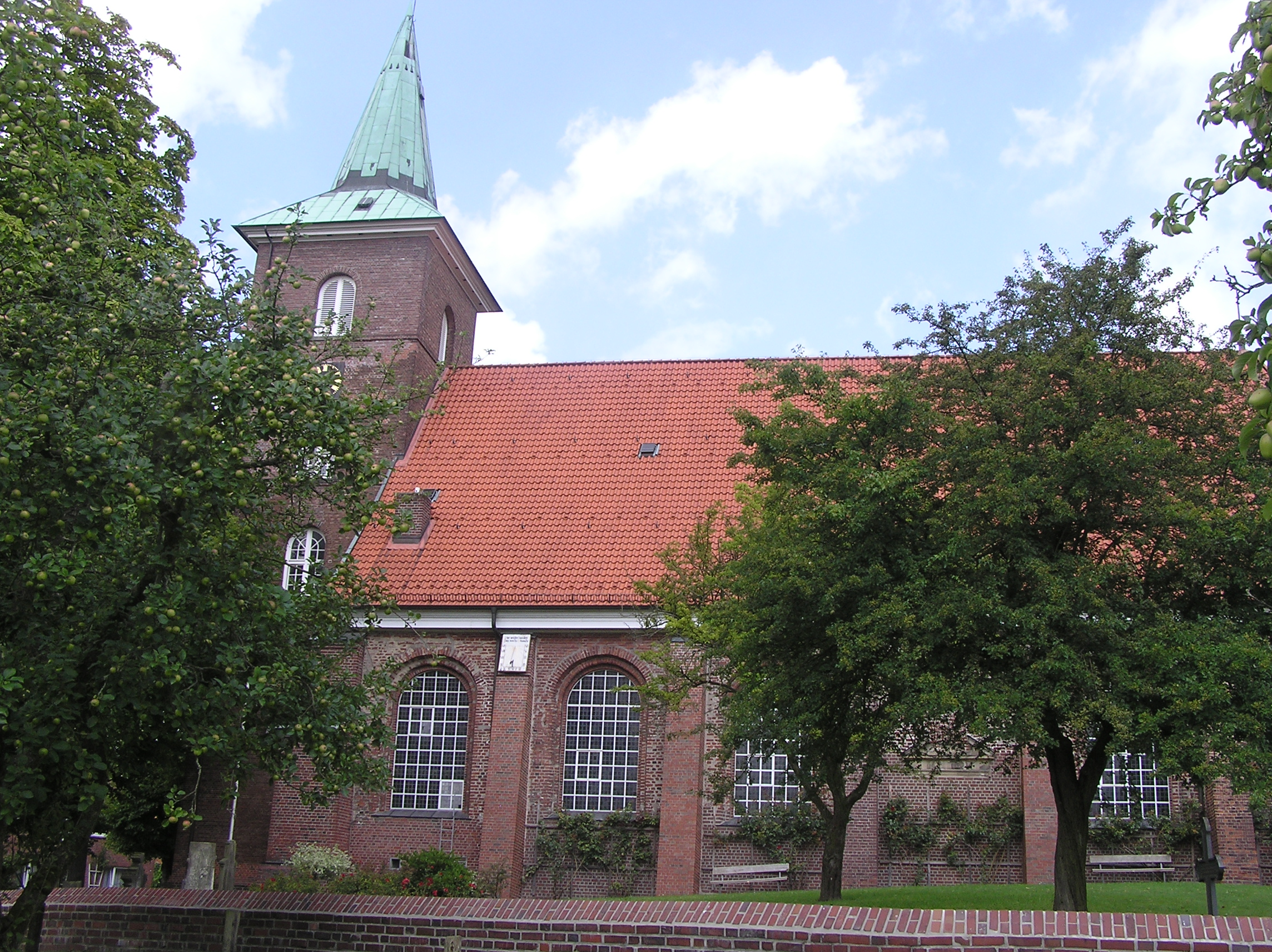
St. Pankratius church, Neuenfelde

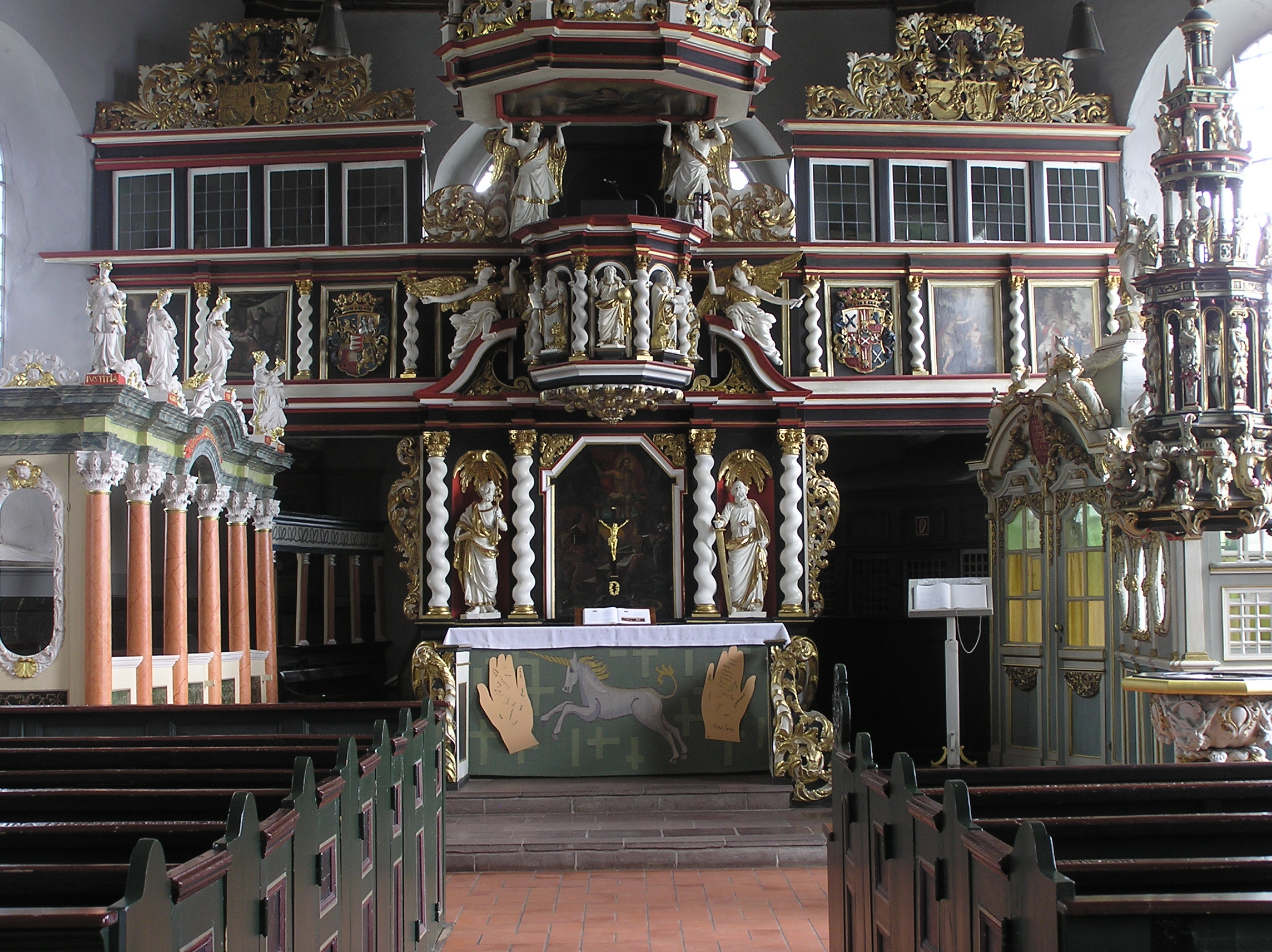
Altar and pulpit

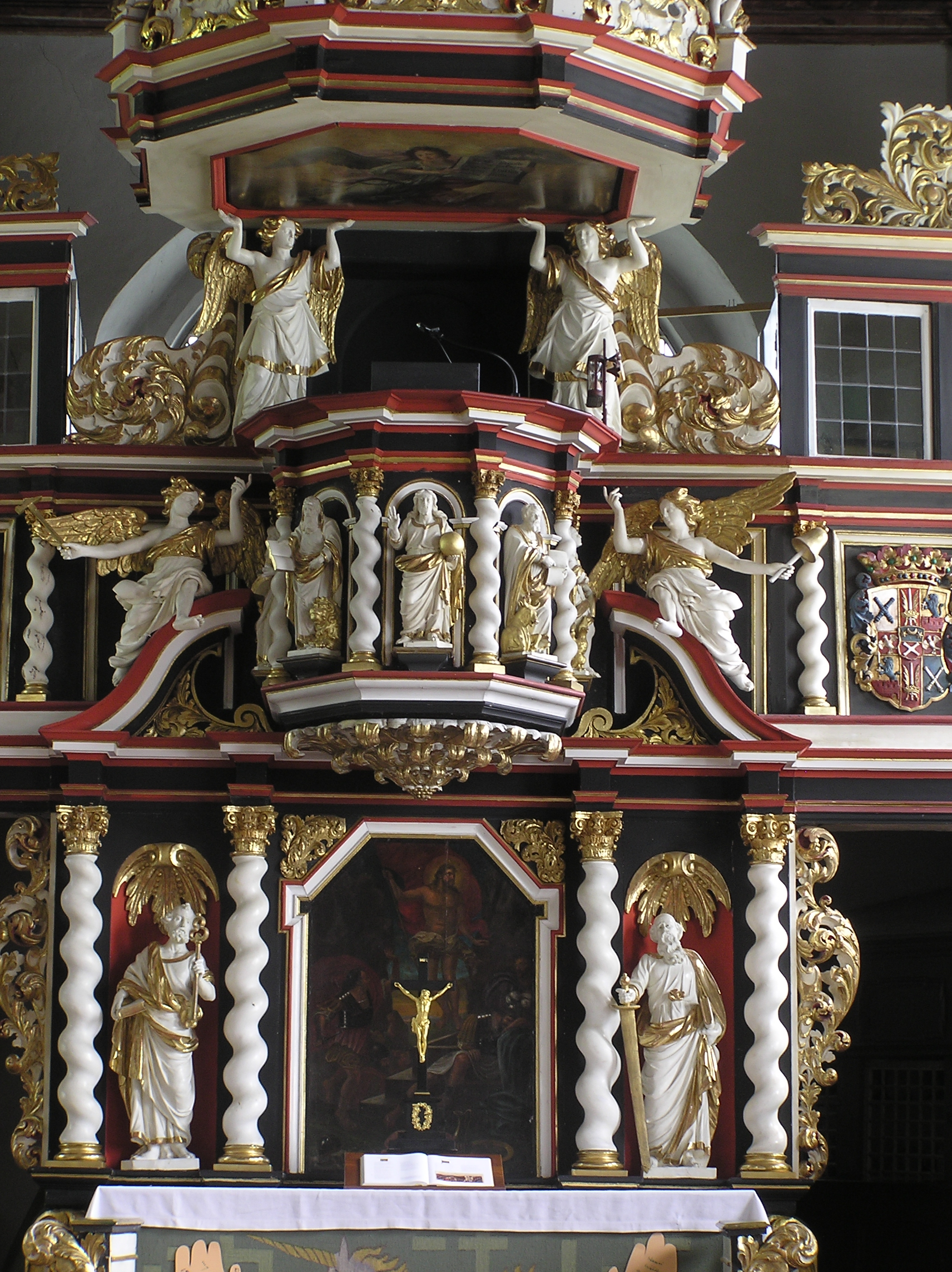
Altar and pulpit (detail)

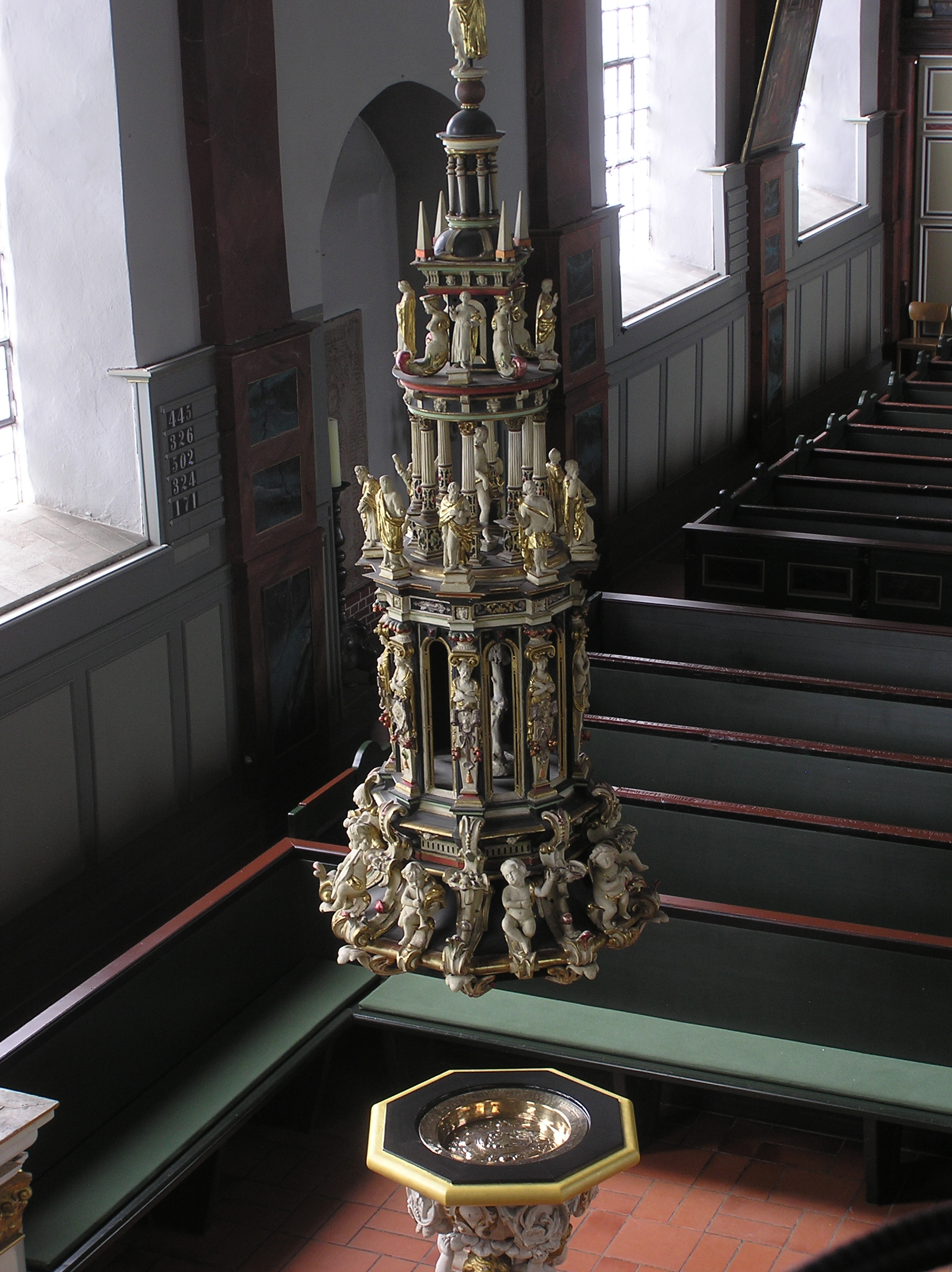
Baptistery

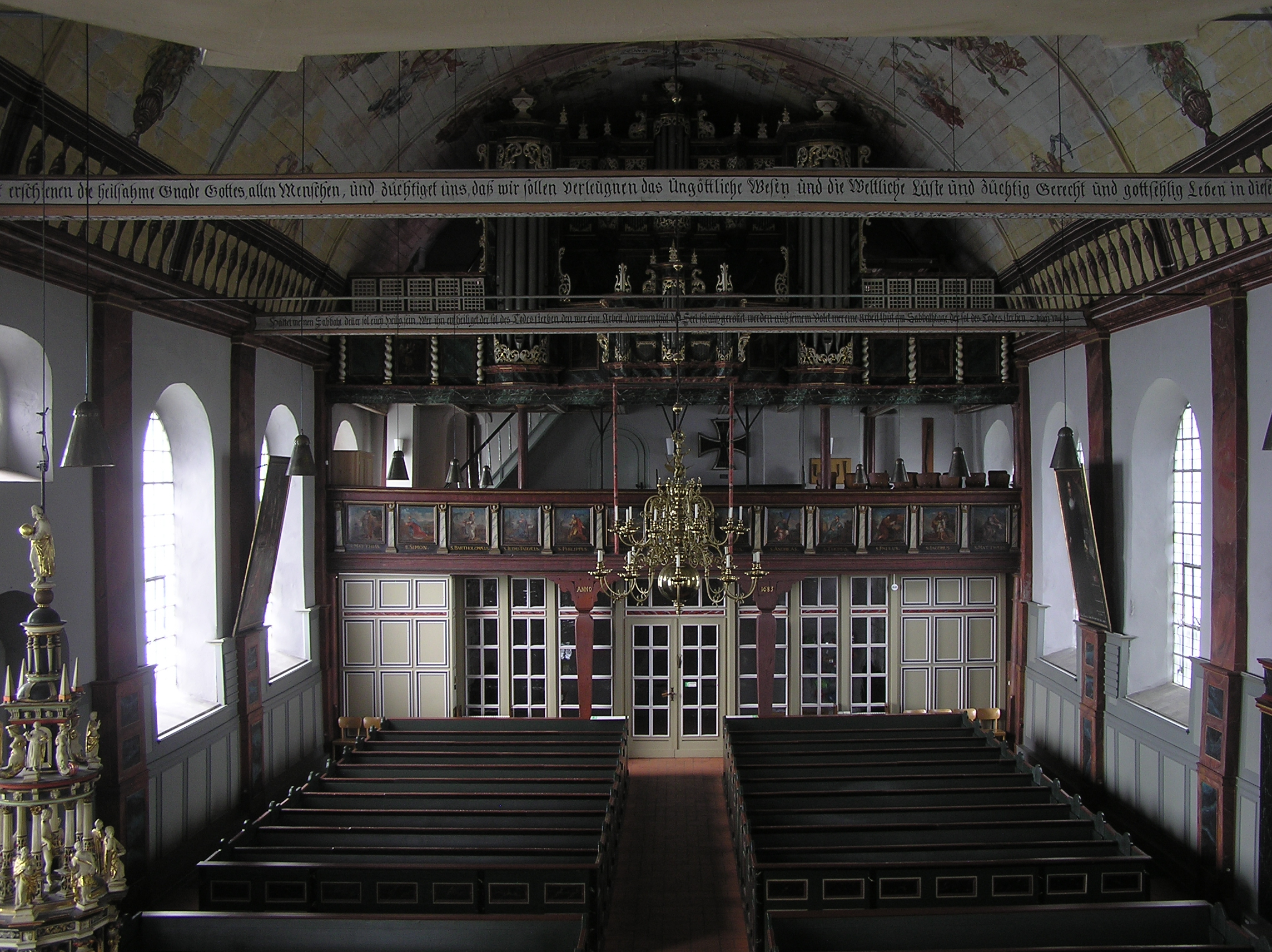
view to the organ (build by Arp Schnitger)

== Notable persons ==
- Arp Schnitger (1648 - 1719), German organ builder. He is buried in the local church St. Pankratius in a family grave with his first wife and a daughter.
