= Neuland, Hamburg =

Neuland
- Quarter of Hamburg
- Interactive map of Neuland
- Location within Germany Location within Hamburg
- Coordinates: 53°28′16″N 10°1′29″E
- Country: Germany
- State: Hamburg
- City: Hamburg
- Borough: Harburg

Area
  - Total: 10.0 km^{2} (3.9 sq mi)

Population (2024-12-31)
  - Total: 1,673
  - Density: 167/km^{2} (433/sq mi)
- Time zone: UTC+01:00 (CET)
  - Summer (DST): UTC+02:00 (CEST)
- Dialling codes: 040
- Vehicle registration: HH

Neuland (German pronunciation: [ˈnɔʏlant]) is a quarter of Hamburg, Germany, in the borough of Harburg. It is located in the east of the borough below the Elbe river. In 2020 the population was 1,794.

== Geography ==
Neuland borders the quarters Wilhelmsburg, Gut Moor and Harburg. It also borders the Landkreis Harburg in Lower Saxony.

== History ==
Neuland became a part of Hamburg through the Greater Hamburg Act in 1937.

== Politics ==
These are the results of Gut Moor and Neuland in the Hamburg state election:

State Election	SPD	AfD	CDU	Greens	Left	FDP	Others
2020	45,1 %	13,1 %	12,4 %	12,0 %	5,4 %	5,1 %	6,9 %
2015	47,4 %	11,5 %	20,5 %	4,2 %	4,4 %	8,0 %	4,0 %
2011	52,0 %	–	26,2 %	5,9 %	4,4 %	6,4 %	5,1 %
2008	36,7 %	–	47,2 %	6,4 %	4,4 %	3,4 %	1,8 %
2004	31,6 %	–	50,8 %	5,1 %	–	2,2 %	10,3 %

== Education ==
The smallest elementary school (Grundschule) in Hamburg is located in Neuland.
