= Hausbruch =

- Quarter of Hamburg
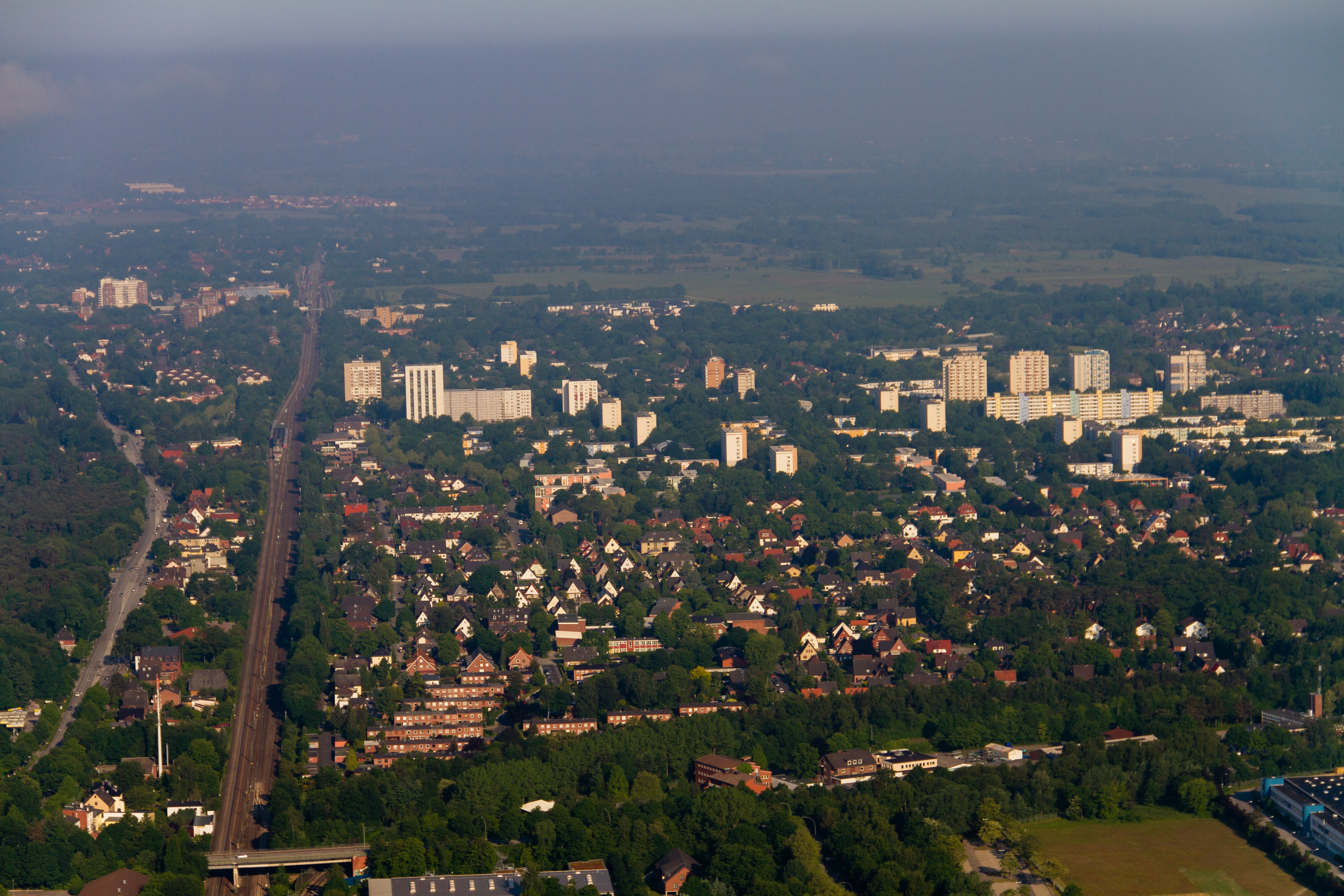
- Neighborhood Neuwiedenthal in 2013

- Location of Hausbruch in Hamburg
- Interactive map of Hausbruch
- Location within Germany Location within Hamburg
- Coordinates: 53.466667°N 9.883333°E
- Country: Germany
- State: Hamburg
- City: Hamburg
- Borough: Hamburg-Harburg

Area
  - Total: 11.2 km^{2} (4.3 sq mi)

Population (2024-12-31)
  - Total: 16,919
  - Density: 1,510/km^{2} (3,910/sq mi)
- Time zone: UTC+01:00 (CET)
  - Summer (DST): UTC+02:00 (CEST)
- Dialling codes: 040
- Vehicle registration: HH

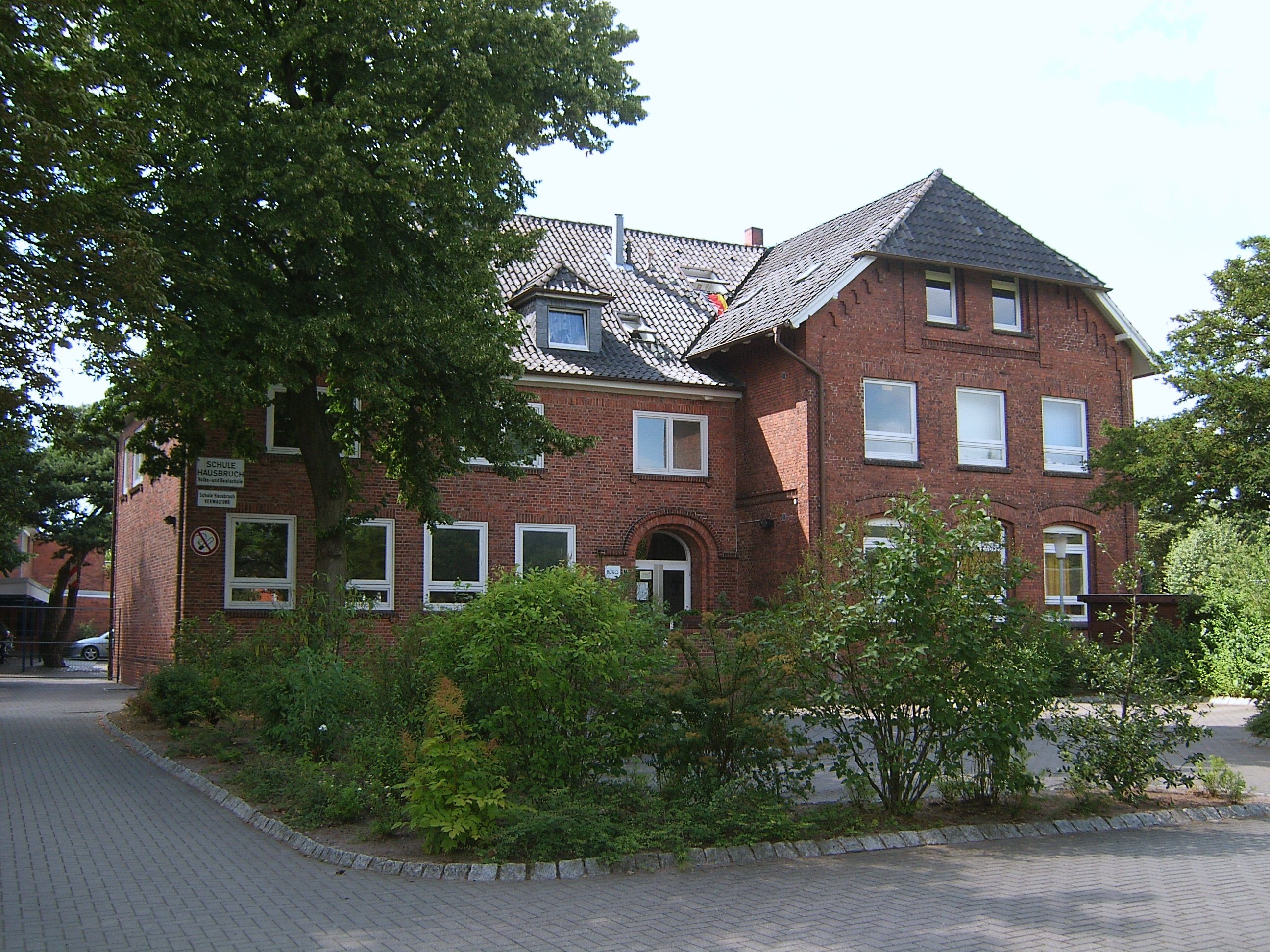
Former school

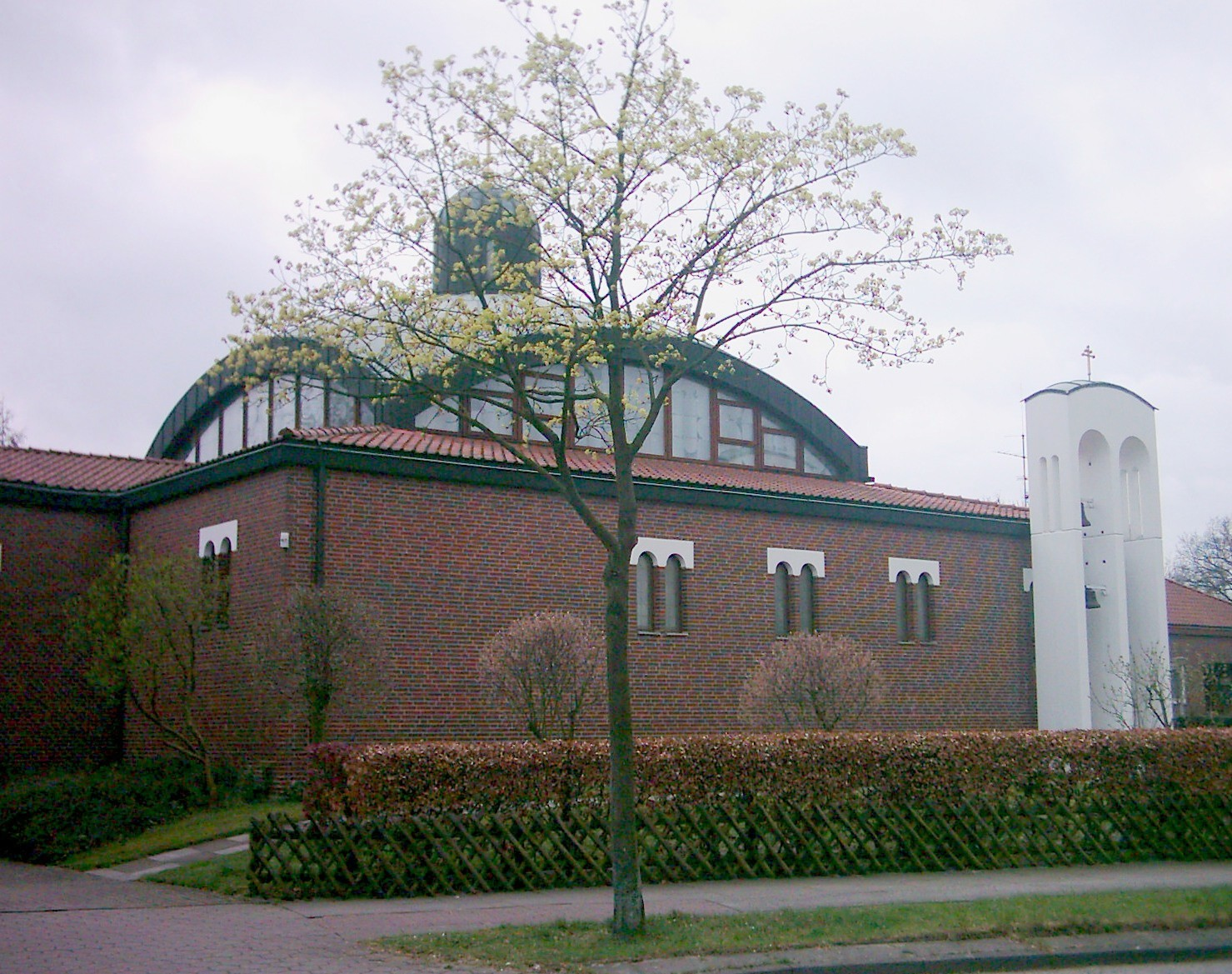
All Saints church of the Ukrainian-catholic community

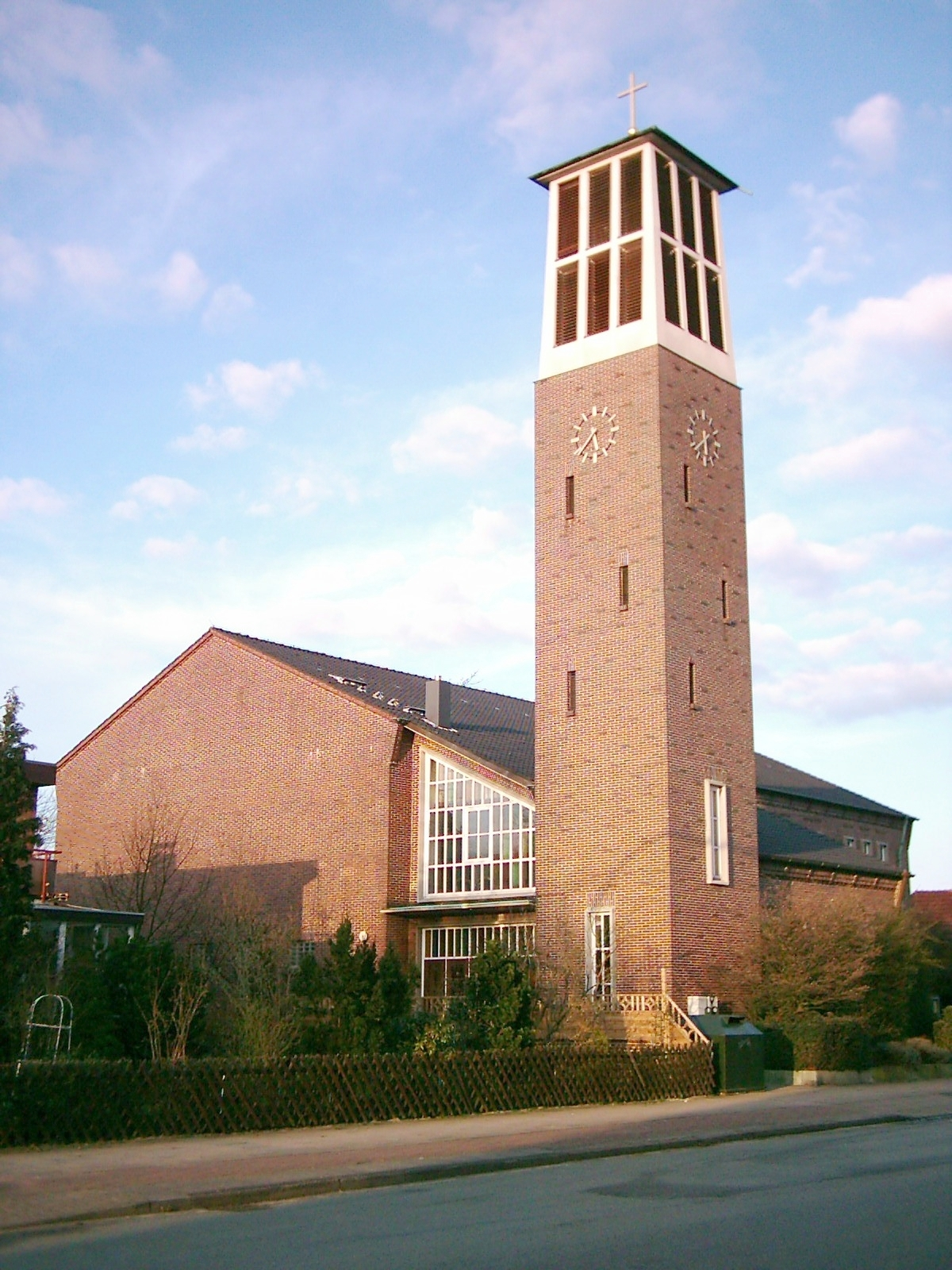
Church of St Thomas

Hausbruch (German pronunciation: [ˈhaʊsˌbʁʊx]) is a quarter of Hamburg, Germany in the Harburg borough. It was first mentioned in 1553. The large housing estate of Neuwiedenthal is located in the quarter.

== Name ==
The name of the quarter derives from a carr (German: Bruchwald) area, which was lent to farmers or woodsmen by its owners, the archbishops of Bremen, during the medieval ages. The fee for the wood was called "Hür" (Heuer, rent). The farmers were called the "Hürer", from this the early names "Hürersbrook" or "Hürsbrook" and the modern form "Hausbruch" developed.

== Geography ==
North of Hausbruch the quarters of Francop and Moorburg are located, to the east Hausbruch borders Heimfeld and in the west Neugraben-Fischbek. In the south, the borough is adjacent to the village of Ehestorf the Lower Saxony municipality of Rosengarten.

In the south, the forest area of Revier Hausbruch, which extends to an area of 770 ha, is located in the quarter. In addition, the heathlands of Neugrabener Heide, which belong to the Fischbeker Heide nature reserve, are within the Hausbruch quarter.

== Politics ==
These are the results of Hausbruch in the Hamburg state election:

Election	SPD	Greens	CDU	AfD	Left	FDP	Others
2020	43,9 %	13,6 %	12,8 %	12,3 %	7,2 %	4,1 %	6,1 %
2015	48,5 %	7,0 %	17,1 %	8,8 %	8,9 %	6,3 %	3,4 %
2011	49,7 %	6,7 %	28,8 %	–	6,0 %	4,6 %	6,2 %
2008	34,4 %	7,0 %	44,7 %	–	6,5 %	4,2 %	3,2 %

== Transportation ==
The Neuwiedenthal station of the Hamburg S-Bahn is situated in the quarter.
