= Harburg, Hamburg =

Harburg
- Borough of Hamburg
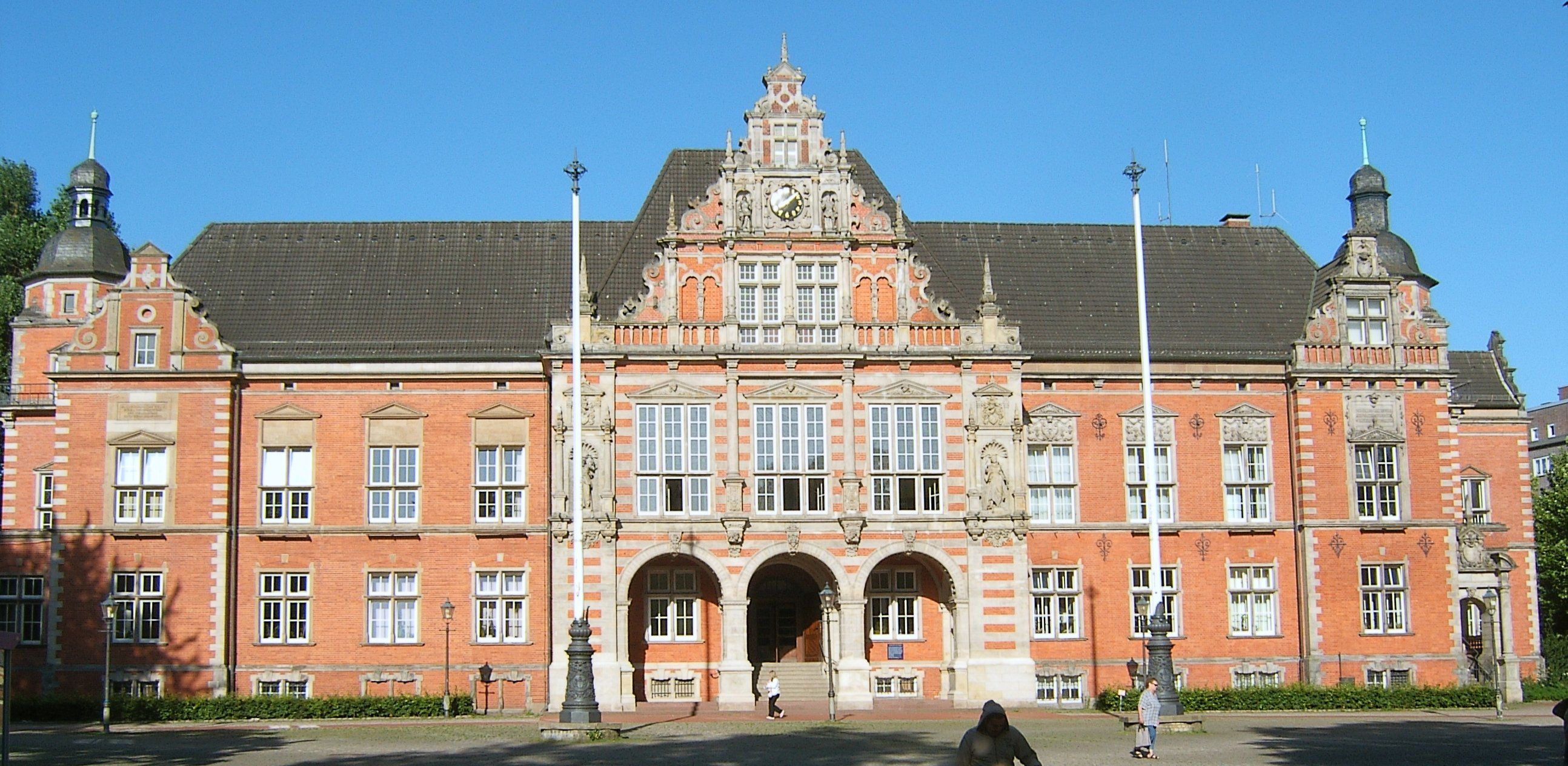
- Harburg town hall (Harburg Rathaus)

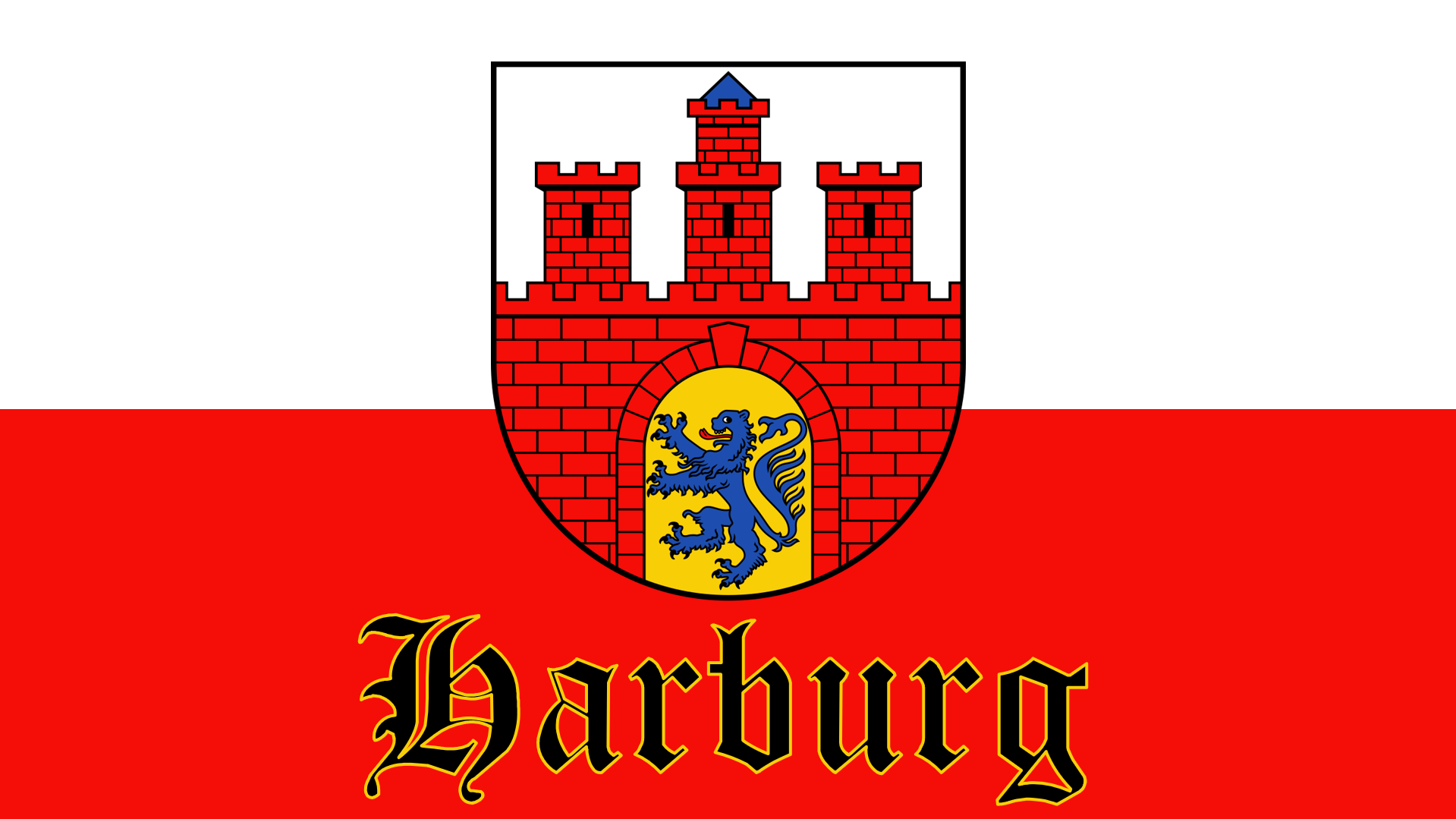
- Flag Coat of arms

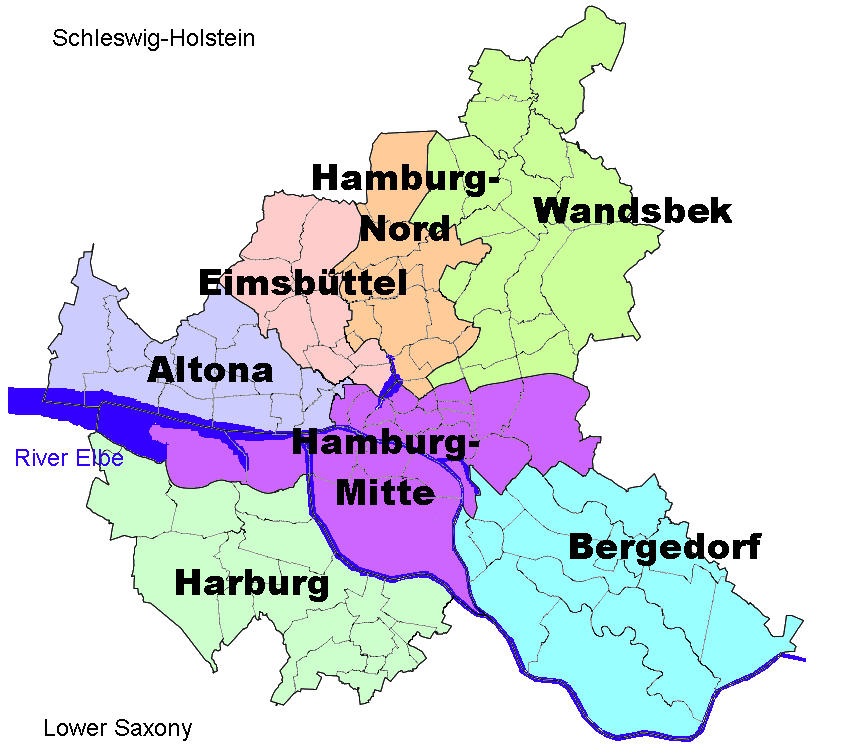
- Boroughs of Hamburg
- Interactive map of Harburg
- Location within Germany Location within Hamburg
- Coordinates: 53°27′N 9°58′E
- Country: Germany
- State: Hamburg
- City: Hamburg
- Subdivisions: 17 quarters

Area
  - Total: 161 km^{2} (62 sq mi)

Population (2024-12-31)
  - Total: 178,341
  - Density: 1,110/km^{2} (2,870/sq mi)
- Time zone: UTC+01:00 (CET)
  - Summer (DST): UTC+02:00 (CEST)
- Dialling codes: 040
- Vehicle registration: HH

Harburg (German pronunciation: [ˈhaːɐ̯bʊʁk]) is a borough of the city of Hamburg, Germany. It is also the name of Harburg quarter in the borough, which used to be the capital of the Harburg district in Lower Saxony. The borough of Harburg lies on the southern banks of the river Elbe and covers parts of the port of Hamburg as well as residential and rural areas. It had a population of 169,221 as of 2020.

== History ==
Until 1937 Harburg belonged to the Prussian Province of Hanover, where it served as the capital of the Harburg district. In 1927 it was merged with the nearby city of Wilhelmsburg to form the city of Harburg-Wilhelmsburg. Following the Greater Hamburg Act, Harburg was incorporated into the city of Hamburg along with several other independent cities such as Altona. Despite its incorporation into Hamburg, Harburg continued to be the capital of the Hanoverian district of Harburg. In 1944, the district capital was moved to Winsen upon Luhe.

On 1 January 2007 the Ortsämter (Precincts) were dissolved and the organisation of all boroughs of Hamburg was restructured. Previously the quarters of Eißendorf, Gut Moor, Harburg, Heimfeld, Langenbek, Marmstorf, Neuland, Rönneburg, Sinstorf and Wilstorf had belonged to the Kerngebiet Harburg (central area), while the quarters of Altenwerder, Cranz, Francop, Hausbruch, Moorburg, Neuenfelde and Neugraben-Fischbek had belonged to the precinct Süderelbe (south Elbe).

On 1 March 2008 Harburg's quarter Wilhelmsburg was transferred to the borough Hamburg-Mitte in keeping with civic law.

== Geography ==
As of 2006, according to the statistical office of Hamburg and Schleswig-Holstein, the borough of Harburg has a total area of 160.6 km^{2}, while the Harburg quarter has an area of 3.9 km^{2}.

=== Administrative divisions ===
Along with the other boroughs of Hamburg, Harburg is divided into quarters:

- Altenwerder
- Cranz
- Eißendorf
- Francop
- Gut Moor
- Harburg
- Hausbruch
- Heimfeld
- Langenbek
- Marmstorf
- Moorburg
- Neuenfelde
- Neugraben-Fischbek
- Neuland
- Rönneburg
- Sinstorf
- Wilstorf

== Demographics ==
In 2006 there were 201,119 inhabitants in the borough. The population density was 1,253 people per km^{2}. 18.9% were children under the age of 18, and 18.7% were 65 years of age or older. 20.1% were resident aliens. 12,785 people were registered as unemployed. In 1999 there were 94,273 households, of which 23.9% had children under the age of 18 living in them and 40% of all households were made up of individuals. The average household size was 2.11.

Population by year

| 1987 | 1988 | 1989 | 1990 | 1991 | 1992 | 1993 | 1994 | 1995 | 1996 | 1997 | 1998 | 1999 |
| 182,512 | 183,710 | 187,244 | 190,623 | 192,546 | 195,423 | 196,541 | 196,931 | 197,535 | 197,710 | 197,383 | 195,873 | 195,830 |

| 2000 | 2001 | 2002 | 2003 | 2004 | 2005 | 2006 |
| 196,263 | 198,400 | 198,924 | 199,715 | 200,092 | 200,322 | 201,119 |

In 2006 there were 24,900 criminal offences in the borough (124 crimes per 1000 people).

These numbers include the Harburg quarter.

== Diet of the borough ==
Subdivisions of Harburg

Simultaneously with elections to the state parliament (Bürgerschaft), the 51-member Bezirksversammlung is elected to represent the citizens.

=== Elections ===
District parliament election of Harburg in 2024
| Parties | % | ± | Seats |
|---|---|---|---|
| Social Democratic Party | 28.4 | ▲1.3 | 15 |
| Christian Democratic Union | 23.0 | ▲3.7 | 12 |
| Alliance 90/The Greens | 15.9 | ▼9.9 | 8 |
| Alternative for Germany | 14.2 | ▲4.0 | 7 |
| The Left | 8.2 | ▼1.1 | 4 |
| Volt | 5.4 | ▲5.4 | 3 |
| Free Democratic Party | 4.8 | ▼1.3 | 2 |
| Total | | | 51 |

== Education ==
The borough has 32 elementary schools and 26 secondary schools (e.g. Friedrich-Ebert-Gymnasium); 3 elementary schools and 4 secondary schools are situated in the Harburg quarter.

The Hamburg University of Technology is internationally renowned for its engineering faculties.

== Infrastructure ==
=== Health systems ===
There were 316 physicians in private practice and 48 pharmacies in 2006.

=== Transportation ===
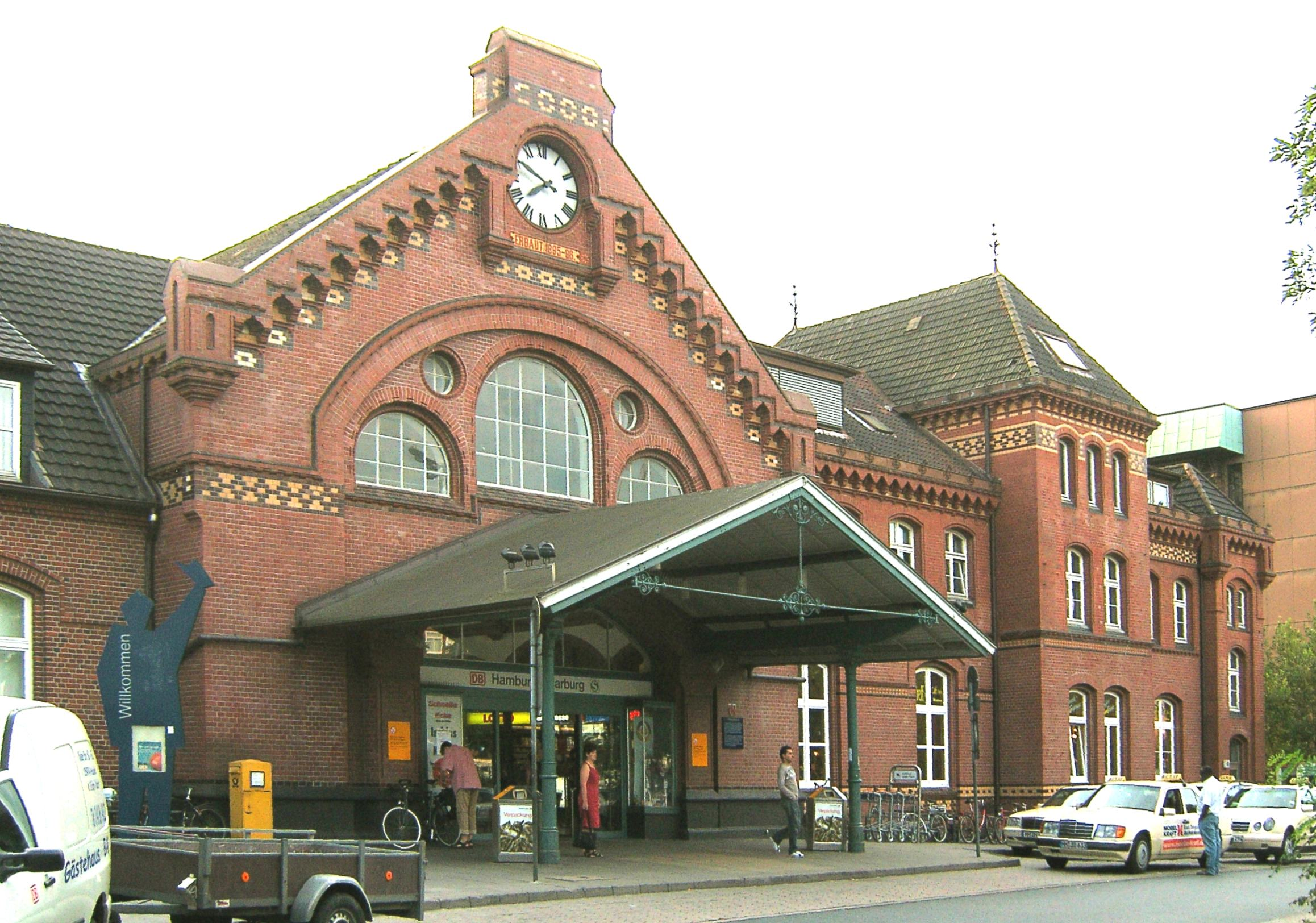
Hamburg-Harburg railway station

The borough and the quarter are served by the Hamburg S-Bahn rapid transit network which serves several stations. Hamburg-Harburg station is a significant rail hub in the city at which long-distance (IC/ICE) trains also stop.

According to the Department of Motor Vehicles (Kraftfahrt-Bundesamt), there were 69,262 private cars registered in the borough as of 2006 (346 cars/1000 people).

== Notes ==
=== References ===
- Greater Hamburg Act Gesetz über Groß-Hamburg und andere Gebietsbereinigungen (Groß-Hamburg-Gesetz) 26 January 1937 Archived 17 January 2018 at the Wayback Machine Text of the law (in German)
- Statistical office Hamburg and Schleswig-Holstein Statistisches Amt für Hamburg und Schleswig-Holstein, official website (in German)
- Act of the areal organisation, July 6, 2006 Gesetz über die räumliche Gliederung der Freien und Hansestadt Hamburg (RäumGiG) (in German)
