= Langenbek =

Quarter in Hamburg, Germany

- Quarter of Hamburg
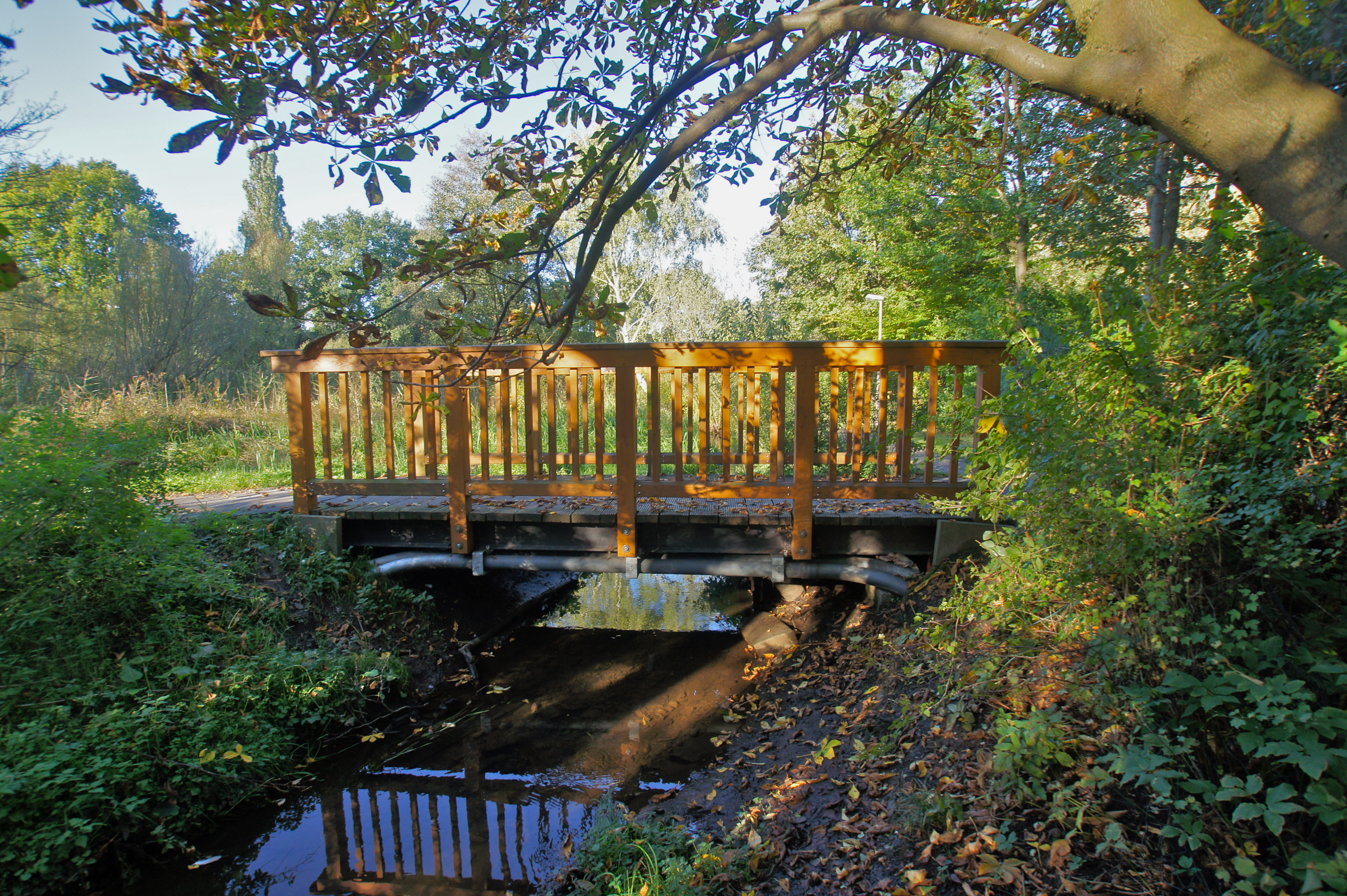
- Bridge over the Engelbek in Langenbek

- Location of Langenbek within Hamburg
- Interactive map of Langenbek
- Location within Germany Location within Hamburg
- Coordinates: 53°25′53″N 9°59′22″E
- Country: Germany
- State: Hamburg
- City: Hamburg
- Borough: Harburg

Population (2024-12-31)
  - Total: 4,075
- Time zone: UTC+01:00 (CET)
  - Summer (DST): UTC+02:00 (CEST)

Langenbek (German pronunciation: [ˈlaŋənbeːk]) is a quarter of Hamburg, Germany in the Harburg borough.
