= Rönneburg =

Quarter in Hamburg, Germany

- Quarter of Hamburg
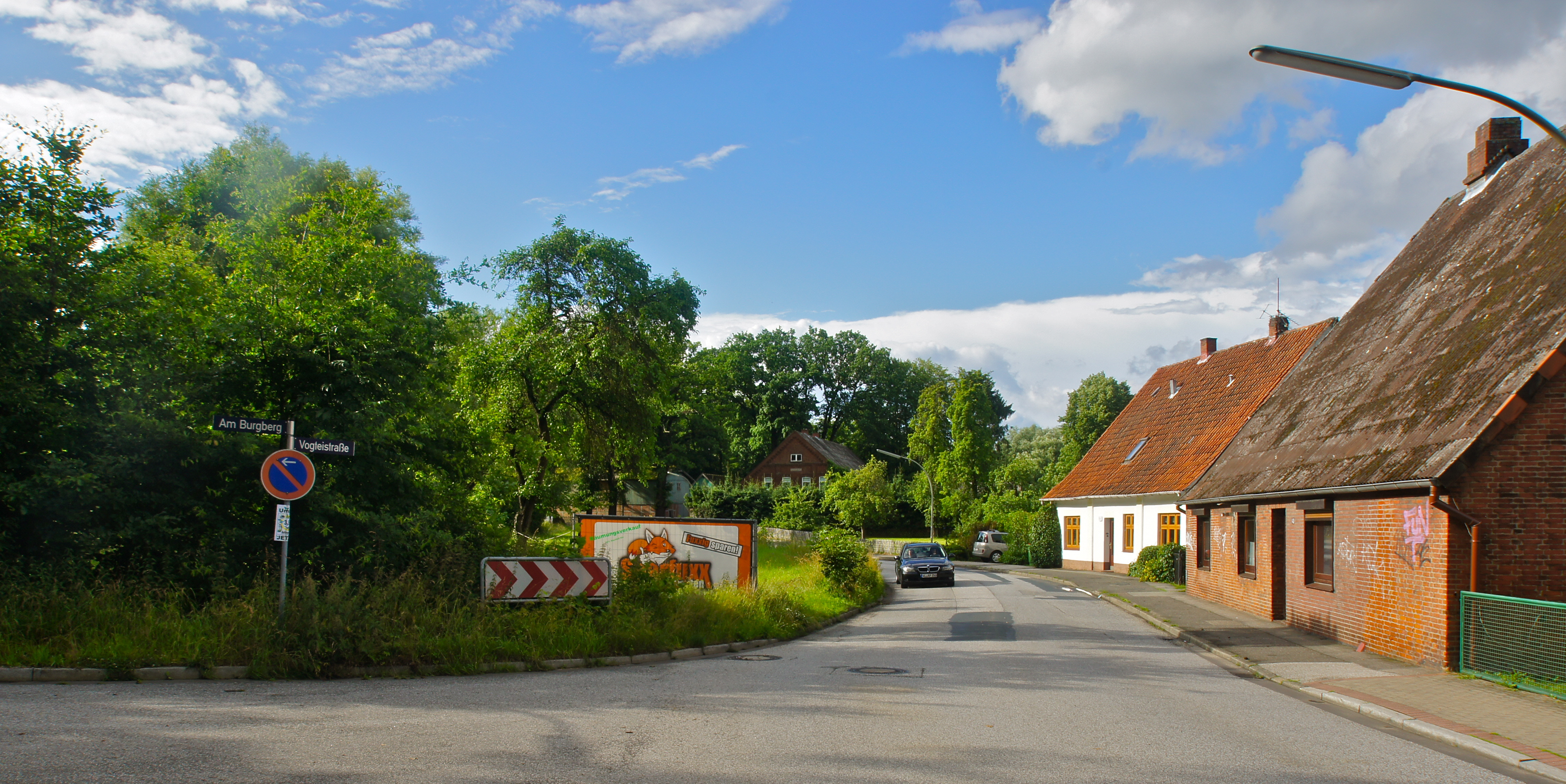

- Location of Rönneburg within Hamburg
- Interactive map of Rönneburg
- Location within Germany Location within Hamburg
- Coordinates: 53°26′15″N 10°00′16″E
- Country: Germany
- State: Hamburg
- City: Hamburg
- Borough: Harburg

Population (2024-12-31)
  - Total: 3,243
- Time zone: UTC+01:00 (CET)
  - Summer (DST): UTC+02:00 (CEST)

Rönneburg (German pronunciation: [ˈʁœnəbʊʁk]) is a quarter of Hamburg, Germany in the Harburg borough.
