= Marmstorf =

Quarter in Hamburg, Germany

- Quarter of Hamburg
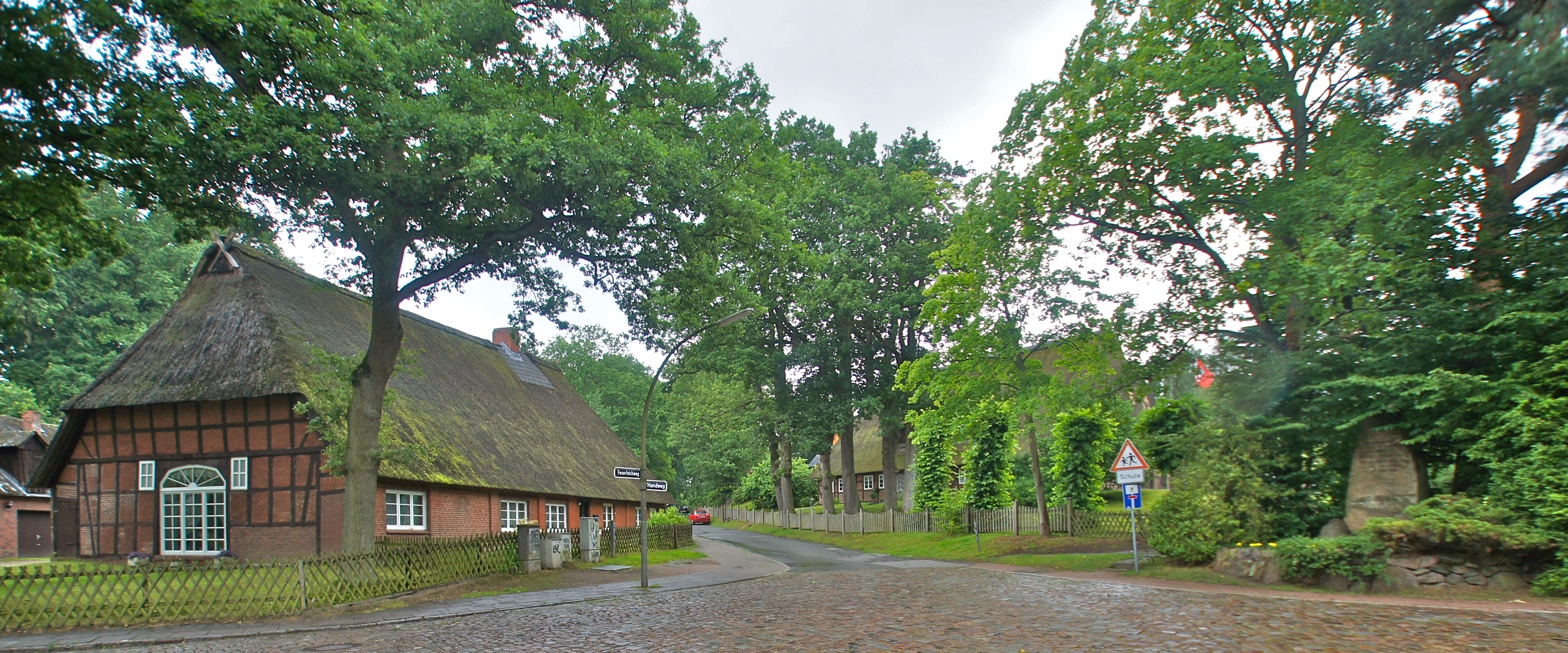

- Location of Marmstorf within Hamburg
- Interactive map of Marmstorf
- Location within Germany Location within Hamburg
- Coordinates: 53°26′09″N 9°58′07″E
- Country: Germany
- State: Hamburg
- City: Hamburg
- Borough: Harburg

Population (2024-12-31)
  - Total: 9,290
- Time zone: UTC+01:00 (CET)
  - Summer (DST): UTC+02:00 (CEST)

Marmstorf (German pronunciation: [ˈmaʁmsˌtɔʁf]) is a quarter of Hamburg, Germany in the Harburg borough.
