= Neugraben-Fischbek =

- Quarter of Hamburg
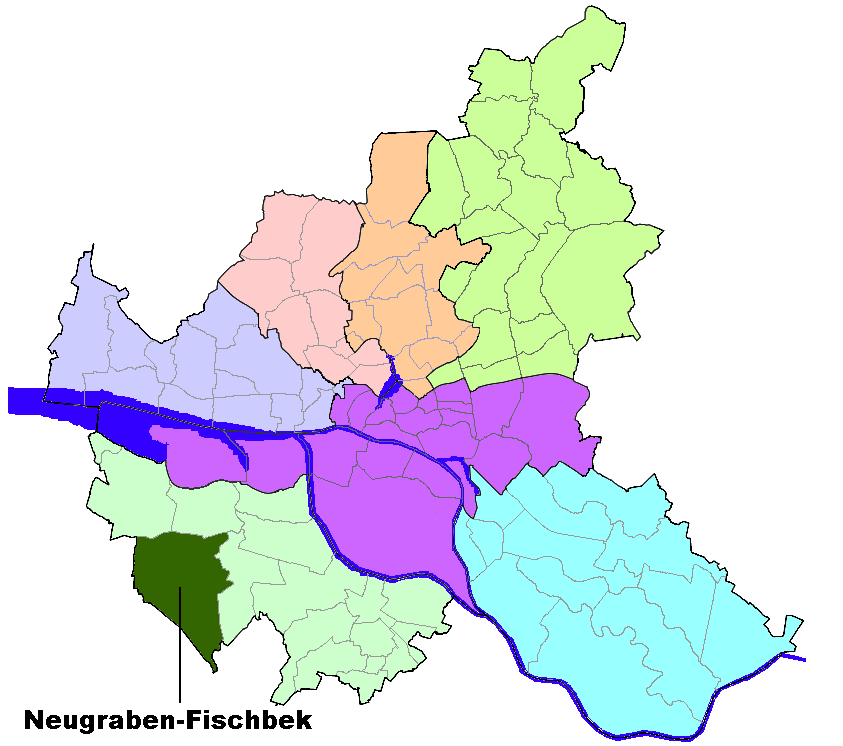
- Location of Neugraben-Fischbek in Hamburg
- Interactive map of Neugraben-Fischbek
- Location within Germany Location within Hamburg
- Coordinates: 53°29′N 9°52′E
- Country: Germany
- State: Hamburg
- City: Hamburg
- Borough: Harburg, Hamburg

Area
  - Total: 22.5 km^{2} (8.7 sq mi)

Population (2024-12-31)
  - Total: 35,295
  - Density: 1,570/km^{2} (4,060/sq mi)
- Time zone: UTC+01:00 (CET)
  - Summer (DST): UTC+02:00 (CEST)
- Dialling codes: 040
- Vehicle registration: HH

Neugraben-Fischbek (German pronunciation: [ˈnɔʏɡʁaːbn̩ ˈfɪʃbeːk]) is a quarter of Hamburg, Germany, and belongs to the borough Harburg. The quarter consists of the old settlements Neugraben and Fischbek, and the more recently constructed area Neuwiedenthal.

== History ==
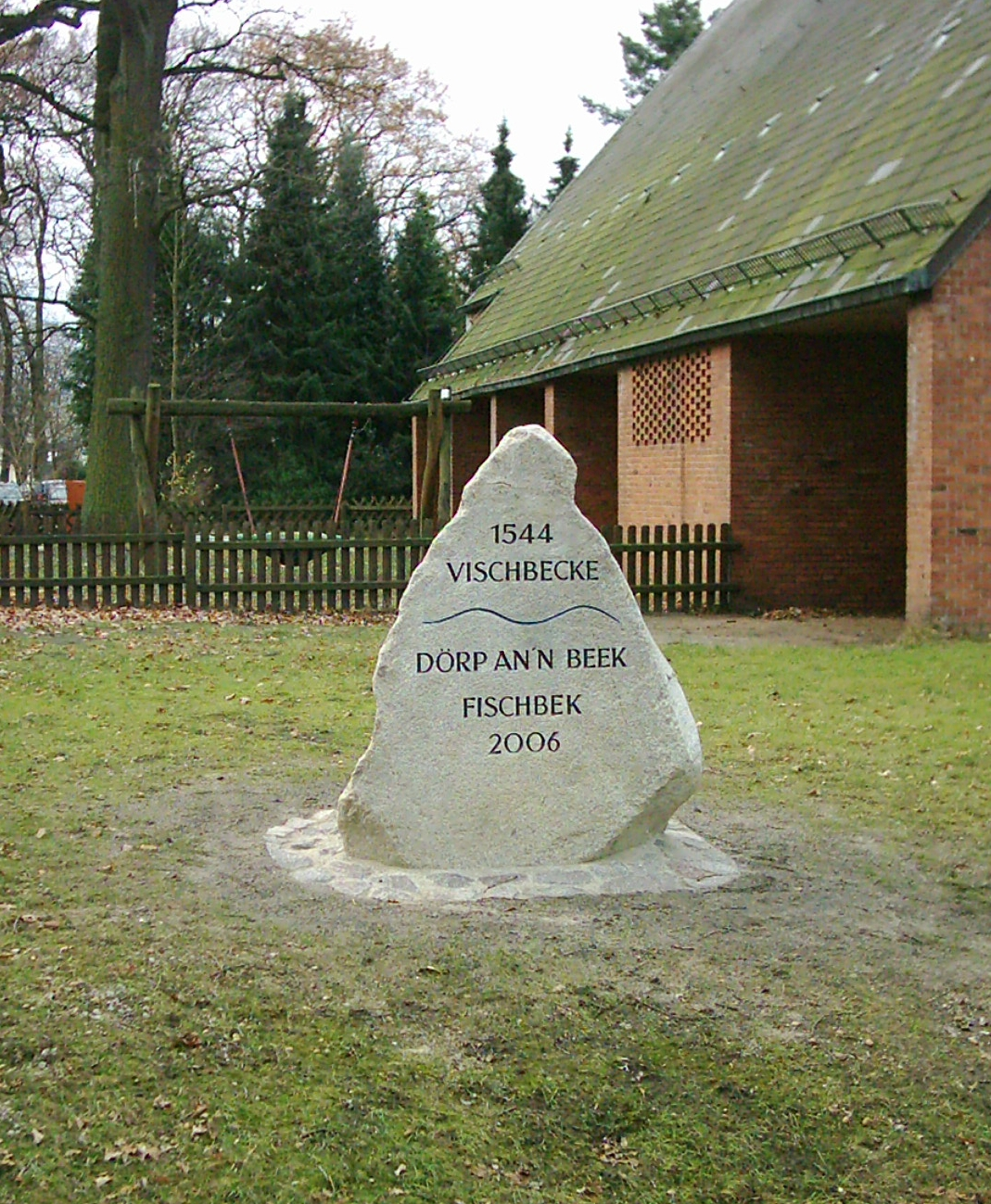
Memorial stone for the foundation of Fischbek 1544

=== History of Fischbek ===
Fischbek was first mentioned in 1544 as Vischbecke. In 1937 the independent village Fischbek was merged into Hamburg.

=== History of Neugraben ===
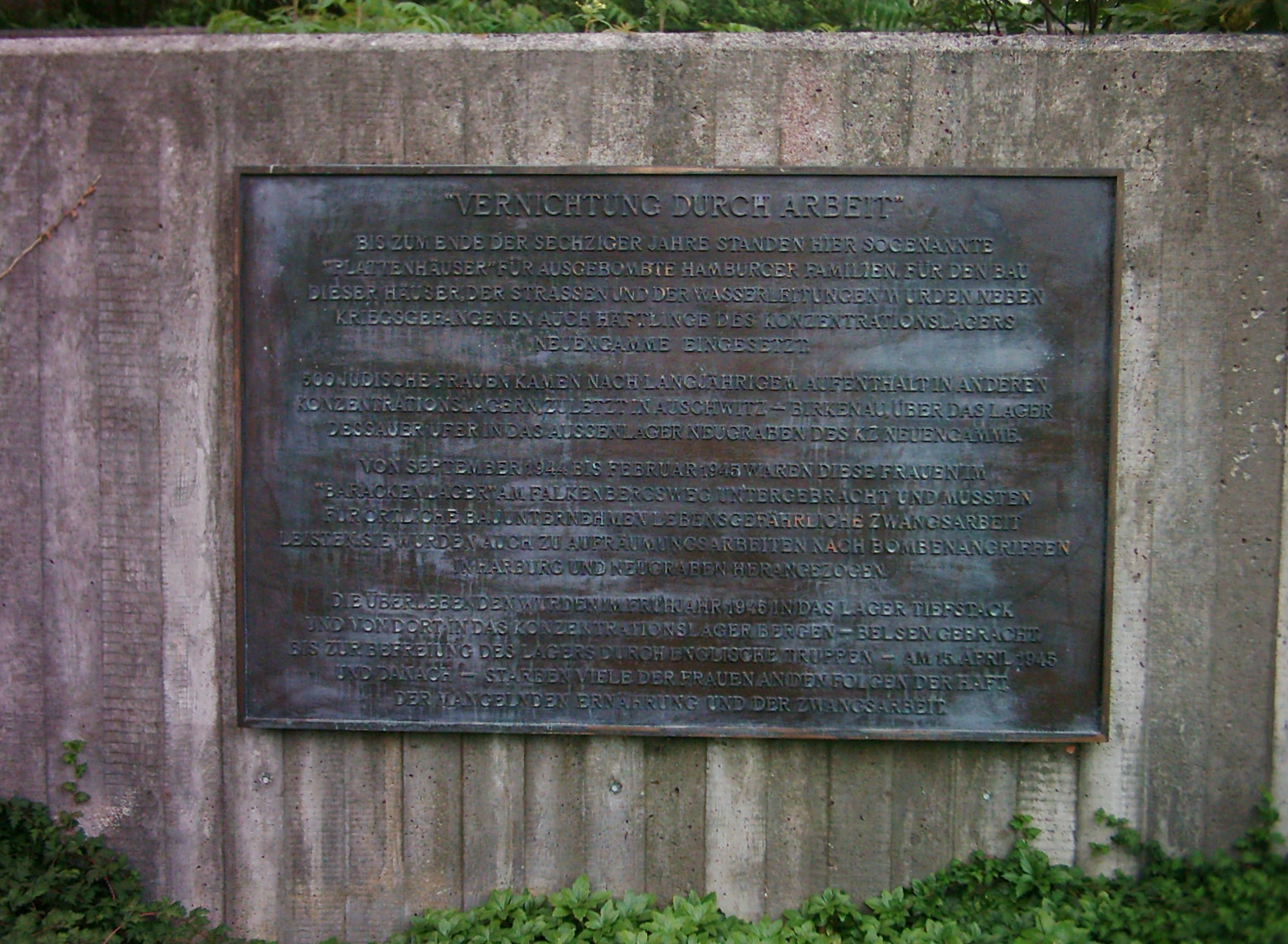
Memorial sign "Extermination through labour" at the quarter office in Neugraben-Fischbek.

In 1937 the independent village of Neugraben was merged into Hamburg.

==== Subcamp Neugraben ====
In Neugraben there was a subcamp of the Nazi concentration camp Neuengamme. On September 13, 1944 the women's subcamp was opened in Falkenbergweg. 500 Czech-Jewish women coming from the Ghetto Theresienstadt were deported to the Auschwitz concentration camp. The SS in Auschwitz selected the women for labour in Hamburg. In the Neugraben camp the work was building auxiliary homes, also laying supply pipes and building streets in the neighbourhood Falkenbergsiedlung. During the last months of World War II, some of the women had to do clearing up work in Harburg's oil industry and to dig antitank obstacles in Hausbruch. In February 1945, the SS transferred the women to the camp Hamburg-Tiefstack and later from there to the Bergen-Belsen concentration camp.

== Geography ==
Neugraben-Fischbek is southeast of the quarter Neuenfelde, in the northeast is Francop, in the east is the quarter Hausbruch. In the south is the district Harburg of the German state Lower Saxony. A large part of the quarter is the nature reserve Harburger Berge (Hills of Harburg) in the south. Neugraben-Fischbek it a mixed rural and suburban area of 22.5 km^{2}.

In Neugraben-Fischbek is the highest point of Hamburg, the Hasselbrack, which has an elevation of 116.2 metres AMSL

== Demographics ==
In 2006 the Neugraben-Fischbek quarter had a population of 27,103. The population density was 1,204/km^{2} (3,118/sq mi). 19% were children under the age of 18, and 21.4% were 65 years of age or older. Resident non-Germans comprised 10.1% of the population. 1,644 people were registered as unemployed.

In 1999 there were 12,170 households, out of which 27.9% had children under the age of 18 living with them and 30.5% of all households were made up of individuals. The average household size was 2.31.

Population by year

1987	1988	1989	1990	1991	1992	1993	1994	1995	1996	1997	1998	1999
25,603	25,794	26,228	26,384	26,505	26,643	26,643	27,415	27,381	27,630	27,589	27,657	27,753

2000	2001	2002	2003	2004	2005	2006
27,685	27,601	27,453	27,599	27,377	27,218	27,103

== Infrastructure ==
=== Transportation ===
Neugraben-Fischbek is served by the rapid transit system of the city train with the stations Neugraben and Fischbek.

== See also ==
- List of subcamps of Neuengamme
