= Wilstorf =

Administrative division in Hamburg, Germany

- Quarter of Hamburg
- Location of Wilstorf within Hamburg
- Interactive map of Wilstorf
- Location within Germany Location within Hamburg
- Coordinates: 53°26′37″N 09°59′03″E
- Country: Germany
- State: Hamburg
- City: Hamburg
- Borough: Harburg

Population (2024-12-31)
  - Total: 17,930
- Time zone: UTC+01:00 (CET)
  - Summer (DST): UTC+02:00 (CEST)

Wilstorf (German pronunciation: [ˈvɪlsˌtɔʁf]) is a quarter of Hamburg, Germany in the Harburg borough.
