= Greater Hamburg Act =

Passed by the government of Nazi Germany on 26 January 1937

Territorial expansion of Hamburg after the Greater Hamburg Act (1937): former City of Hamburg former City of Bergedorf (to Hamburg since 1868) areas previously belonging to Hamburg and remaining to Hamburg Incorporated City of Altona Incorporated City of Wandsbek Incorporated City of Harburg-Wilhelmsburg Incorporated rural communities

The Greater Hamburg Act (German: Groß-Hamburg-Gesetz), in full the Law Regarding Greater Hamburg and Other Territorial Readjustments (German: Gesetz über Groß-Hamburg und andere Gebietsbereinigungen), was passed by the government of Nazi Germany on 26 January 1937, and mandated the exchange of territories between Hamburg and the Free State of Prussia. It became effective on 1 April 1937.

== Greater Hamburg ==
Hamburg lost most of its exclaves, including Geesthacht and Cuxhaven. In return, Hamburg was enlarged by including formerly Prussian towns such as Altona, Wandsbek, and Harburg-Wilhelmsburg as well as a number of villages. Altona and Wandsbek had been part of the Prussian province of Schleswig-Holstein, while Harburg-Wilhelmsburg had been a part of the Prussian Province of Hanover. This represented the formal merger of what had previously been referred to as the "Four-City Region".

== Lübeck ==
Besides the regulations for Hamburg, the law incorporated most of the Free City of Lübeck into the Prussian province of Schleswig-Holstein, though some smaller villages were included in the State of Mecklenburg. This constituted a victory for the Gauleiter (regional party leader) of Schleswig-Holstein, who had competed with the neighbouring Gauleiter of Mecklenburg for control of the city ever since 1933.

Until the Greater Hamburg Act, Lübeck had been a separate member state of the Reich. Two reasons for ending this status are cited: Adolf Hitler had a distaste for Lübeck ever since the city council prohibited him from campaigning there in 1932, and Lübeck formed part of the compensation given to Prussia for its losses to Hamburg (besides Lübeck, Prussia also gained Hamburg's territories of Geesthacht, which was also incorporated into the province of Schleswig-Holstein, and Ritzebüttel (including Cuxhaven), which went to the Province of Hanover.

== See also ==
- Greater Berlin Act
