= Otto of Brunswick =

Otto of Brunswick may refer to:

- Otto IV, Holy Roman Emperor (1175–1218)
- Otto I, Duke of Brunswick-Lüneburg (1204 – 1252), also called Otto the Child
- Otto the Mild, Duke of Brunswick-Lüneburg (1292–1344)
- Otto II, Duke of Brunswick-Lüneburg (1266–1330), also called Otto the Strict
- Otto III, Duke of Brunswick-Lüneburg (1296–1352)
- Otto IV, Duke of Brunswick-Lüneburg (d. 1446), also called Otto the Lame
- Otto V, Duke of Brunswick-Lüneburg (1439–1471), also called Otto the Victorious
- Otto, Duke of Brunswick-Grubenhagen (1320–1398), also called Otto the Tarantine
- Otto I, Duke of Brunswick-Harburg (1495–1549)
- Otto II, Duke of Brunswick-Harburg (1528–1603)
- Otto III, Duke of Brunswick-Harburg (1572–1641)
- Otto II, Duke of Brunswick-Osterode (1396-1452)
- Duke Otto Henry of Brunswick-Harburg (1555-1591)
- Francis Otto, Duke of Brunswick-Lüneburg (1530–1559)
- Otto II of Brunswick-Wolfenbüttel (c. 1364–1406), Archbishop of Bremen
