= William Augustus, Duke of Brunswick-Harburg =

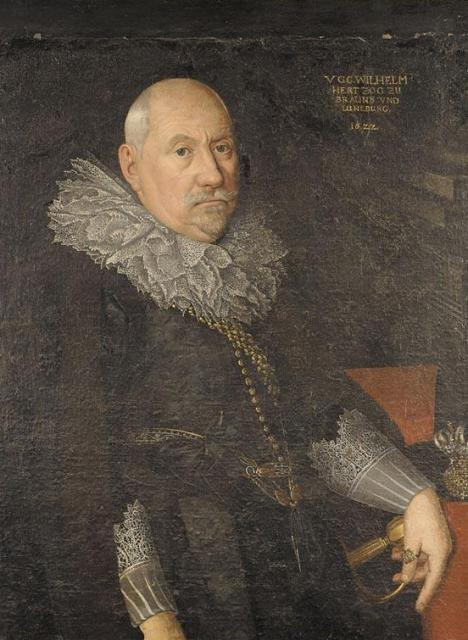
- William Augustus, Duke of Brunswick-Lüneburg-Harburg
- Born: 15 March 1564; Harburg
- Died: 30 March 1642 (aged 78); Harburg
- Noble family: House of Guelph
- Father: Otto II, Duke of Brunswick-Harburg
- Mother: Hedwig of East Frisia

Duke William Augustus of Brunswick-Lüneburg-Harburg (15 March 1564 in Harburg – 30 March 1642 in Harburg) was Duke of Brunswick-Lüneburg-Harburg.

== Life ==
William Augustus was a son of Duke Otto II of Brunswick-Harburg (1528-1603) from his second marriage with Hedwig (1535-1616), the daughter of the Count Enno II of East Frisia.

William Augustus was regarded as extremely learned and, like his father, as a follower of the Lutheran doctrine. In 1575, he became rector of the University of Rostock. He later continued his studies at the University of Leipzig. In 1582, he undertook a Grand Tour to France and England and then enrolled with his brothers at the University of Helmstedt. In 1594, he again went on a journey that took him through Germany, Poland, Switzerland, Italy, Holland, Denmark and Livonia. William Augustus kept a journal about his travels.

After the death of his father, he took up the government of Harburg jointly with his brothers Christopher and Otto III. After they died, he ruled alone.

In 1618, William Augustus began the construction of the palace at Moisburg. After the death of the Duke Frederick Ulrich of Brunswick-Wolfenbüttel, he received the County of Hoya from his inheritance. August Wilhelm died unmarried and childless. His inheritance was divided by Dukes of Frederick IV of Brunswick-Celle and Augustus II of Brunswick-Wolfenbüttel.

== Ancestors ==
Ancestors of William Augustus, Duke of Brunswick-Harburg

8. Henry I of Lüneburg
4. Otto I, Duke of Brunswick-Lüneburg-Harburg
9. Margarete of Saxony
2. Otto II, Duke of Brunswick-Harburg
10. John III von Campe
5. Meta von Campe
1. William Augustus, Duke of Brunswick-Harburg
12. Edzard I of East Frisia
6. Enno II, Count of East Frisia
13. Elisabeth of Rietberg
3. Hedwig of East Frisia
14. John V, Count of Oldenburg
7. Anna of Oldenburg
15. Anna of Anhalt-Zerbst

William Augustus of Brunswick and Lunenburg, Harburg line House of Welf Cadet branch of the House of Este Born: 15 March 1564 in Harburg upon Elbe Died: 30 March 1642 in Harburg
Regnal titles
Preceded by Otto II	Duke of Brunswick-Harburg; 1603–1642	Harburg reunited with Celle line of Brunswick and Lunenburg
