= Duchess Anna of Prussia =

Electress consort of Brandenburg and Duchess consort of Prussia

Anna of Prussia
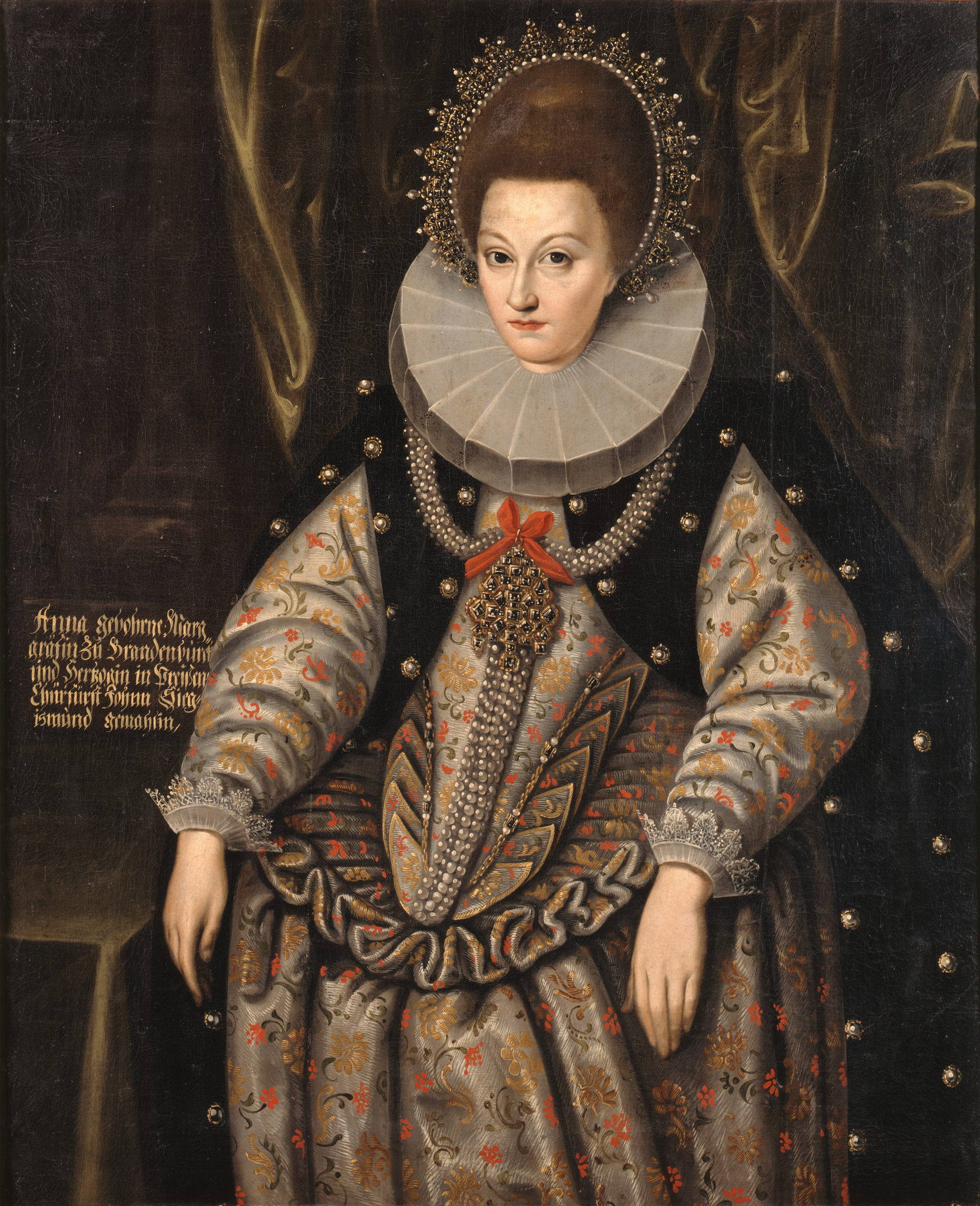

Electress consort of Brandenburg
- Tenure: 18 July 1608 – 23 December 1619

Duchess consort of Prussia
- Tenure: 28 August 1618 – 23 December 1619
- Born: 3 July 1576; Königsberg, Duchy of Prussia
- Died: 30 August 1625 (aged 49); Berlin, Electorate of Brandenburg
- Spouse: John Sigismund, Elector of Brandenburg (m. 1594; died 1619)
- Issue: George William, Elector of Brandenburg; Anne Sophia, Duchess of Brunswick-Lüneburg; Maria Eleonora, Queen of Sweden; Catherine, Princess of Transylvania; Prince Joachim Sigismund
- House: Hohenzollern
- Father: Albert Frederick, Duke of Prussia
- Mother: Marie Eleonore of Cleves

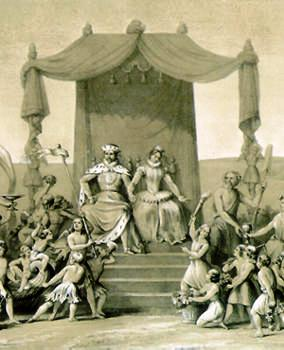
An allegory of the union of the lands united under Brandenburg through the inheritance rights of Anna of Prussia.

Duchess Anna of Prussia and Jülich-Cleves-Berg (3 July 1576 – 30 August 1625) was Electress consort of Brandenburg and Duchess consort of Prussia by marriage to John Sigismund, Elector of Brandenburg. She was the daughter of Albert Frederick, Duke of Prussia, and Marie Eleonore of Cleves.

== Biography ==
=== Early life ===
She was born on 3 July 1576, as the eldest daughter of Albert Frederick and Maria Eleonora.

Anna's father Albert Frederick had for many years suffered from mental disorders, and had by 1577 grown so unstable that he was placed under the regency of his cousin George Frederick, Margrave of Brandenburg-Ansbach. He had twice tried to commit suicide and was prone to violent outbursts and a great fear of "Turks and Muscovites" overrunning Germany.

This made the position of Marie Eleonore more difficult at the ducal court of Königsberg. In 1591, she returned with Anna and her other daughters to Jülich, where they remained until 1592.

Marie Eleonore, a devout Lutheran, was dedicated to raising her daughters strictly Lutheran and did her best to see her daughters married to German princes rather than Polish princes. In 1591, Anna was betrothed to John Sigismund of Brandenburg, who was a Lutheran.

=== Marriage ===
Anna was married to John Sigismund on 30 October 1594, and the couple settled in Königsberg.

Anna was described as intellectually superior to her spouse, temperamental and strong-willed. She is reported to have thrown plates and glasses at her spouse during arguments. She fought on her own to secure her succession rights to various fiefs and handled negotiations with her competitors. In 1612, she placed her demands before the Emperor. She continued to play an important role during the reign of her son.

In 1602, Anna's mother-in-law Catherine of Brandenburg-Küstrin died, and in 1603, her younger sister Eleanor married Anna's father-in-law Joachim Frederick, Elector of Brandenburg, as his second wife. By this double marriage to two of the heirs of Brandenburg had a strong claim to the entire Brandenburg inheritance. Furthermore, he had also taken over the regency for their father, Albert Frederick.

Joachim Frederick would pass away in 1608. His son John Sigismund then succeeded him both as duke and as regent for his mentally ill father-in-law, and Anna became the new duchess. This was also the same year her mother, Marie Eleonore, died.

In 1611, King Sigismund III Vasa of Poland permitted Prince-Elector Johann Sigismund to succeed Albrecht Friedrich as Duke of Prussia. John Sigismund inherited the Duchy of Prussia upon Anna's father's death in 1618, but the duchy continued to be held as a fief under the Polish Crown until 1656/7.

In 1613 John Sigismund converted to Calvinism joined by their eldest son and daughter, despite efforts from John Sigismund that she would convert, Anna and her two youngest daughters remained staunchly Lutheran. After the conversion of her spouse to Calvinism, Anna became the protector and spokesperson of the Lutherans. Her husband, zealous in his new faith, set about removing paintings and altarpieces from the churches and supported other iconoclasts doing the same. Anna however felt different and tried to rescue the artworks from being destroyed.

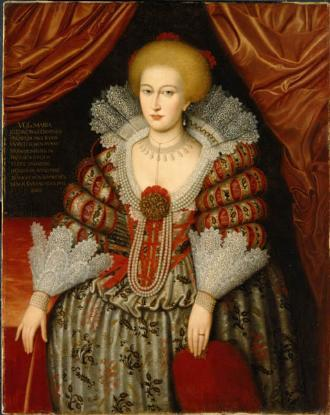
Maria Eleonora of Brandenburg

In 1616 Gustavus Adolphus of Sweden was looking for a Protestant bride, and he was very interested in Anna's daughter, the 17-year-old Maria Eleonora. John Sigismund was favorably inclined towards the Swedish king, but he was in very ill health after suffering apoplectic stroke in the autumn of 1617. Anna initially showed a strong dislike for her daughter's suitor, this had less to do with the young king himself and more with her looking after the interests of her family. Particularly in her role as heiress of the Prussian lands. because Prussia was a Polish fief and the Polish King Sigismund III Vasa still resented his loss of Sweden to Gustavus Adolphus' father Charles IX. By her daughter's potential marriage to the Polish king's old enemy, it might turn out that Sigismund would deny for her son to succeed.

Anna’s husband died on 23 December 1619, and Gustavus Adolphus lost his strongest supporter for the match. A few years later, in 1620, however, Gustavus Adolphus returned to Berlin. Anna, still against the marriage, acted cold towards the young king and even refused to grant the Swedish king a private meeting with her daughter. Maria Eleonora, however, seemed to display a partiality for Gustavus Adolphus. Leaving the Brandenburg court once again, Gustavus Adolphus traveled to other Protestant German courts to see if another bridal candidate could be found.

On his return to Berlin, Anna seemed to have completely changed her thought about the match and was much warmer in her demeanour towards the young king. The reason for her changed attitude possibly had to do with the potential of the marriage as leverage as currently her son Georg William and Sigismund III were negotiating for the Polish king's permission for Georg William to succeed as duke of Prussia. As the region had been a part of the Kingdom of Poland since the Second Peace of Thorn (1466), King Sigismund I the Old of Poland as its suzerain, granted the territory, the Duchy of Prussia, as an hereditary fief (a Polish fief) to Annas paternal grandfather Albert of Brandenburg-Ansbach, the first Duke of Prussia per the Treaty of Kraków, a decision that was sealed by the Prussian Homage in Kraków in April 1525. Anna's grandfather had established Lutheranism as the very first Protestant state church. Dedicated to Lutheranism, it was Anna's wish that that her youngest son Joachim Sigisimund (who was still a Lutheran) would become the new ruler of Prussia, rather than her Calvinist older son.

It would appear that Anna's support for the marriage itself had been part a strategy to disrupt the negotiations between her son and Sigismund in favor of Joachim Sigismund. When George William heard of his mother's meddling, he was very dismayed and harboured some resentment towards his mother.

In an effort to keep her son from preventing the marriage, on 7 October 1620, Anna Maria Eleonora, her youngest daughter Catherine left Brandenburg. and went to Brunswick, where Annas eldest daughter Anna Sophia took them in.

Anna of Prussia pleaded with her son to provide some monetary assistance, and being denied this, provided herself with a selection of valuables from the exchequer before she joined her daughters in Brunswick. Leaving from Wismar, a Swedish ship took them over to Kalmar, where Gustavus Adolphus was waiting to escort them. The wedding took place in Stockholm on 25 November 1620. Anna and her daughter Catherine stayed with her daughter in Sweden for several years after the marriage.

== Death ==
Anna died in 1625. She had ordered that her remains be interred in Königsberg, not beside her husband as was common.

== Issue ==
- George William of Brandenburg (13 November 1595 – 1 December 1640). His successor.
- Anna Sophia of Brandenburg (18 March 1598 – 19 December 1659). Married Frederick Ulrich, Duke of Brunswick-Lüneburg.
- Maria Eleonora of Brandenburg (11 November 1599 – 28 March 1655). Married Gustavus Adolphus of Sweden. They were parents of Christina of Sweden.
- Catherine of Brandenburg (28 May 1602 – 27 August 1649). Married first Gabriel Bethlen, Prince of Transylvania, and secondly Franz Karl of Saxe-Lauenburg.
- Joachim Sigismund of Brandenburg (25 July 1603 – 22 February 1625) died aged 21, unmarried and without issue.
- Agnes of Brandenburg (31 August 1606 – 12 March 1607) died in infancy.
- John Frederick of Brandenburg (18 August 1607 – 1 March 1608) died in infancy.
- Albrecht Christian of Brandenburg (7–14 March 1609) died in infancy.

Duchess Anna of Prussia House of Hohenzollern Born: 3 July 1576 Died: 30 August 1625
German nobility
Vacant Title last held by Eleanor of Prussia	Electress consort of Brandenburg; 18 July 1608 – 23 December 1619	Succeeded by Elizabeth Charlotte of the Palatinate
Vacant Title last held by Marie Eleonore of Cleves	Duchess consort of Prussia; 28 August 1618 – 23 December 1619	Succeeded by Elizabeth Charlotte of the Palatinate
