= Goldbach (Este) =

River of Lower Saxony, Germany

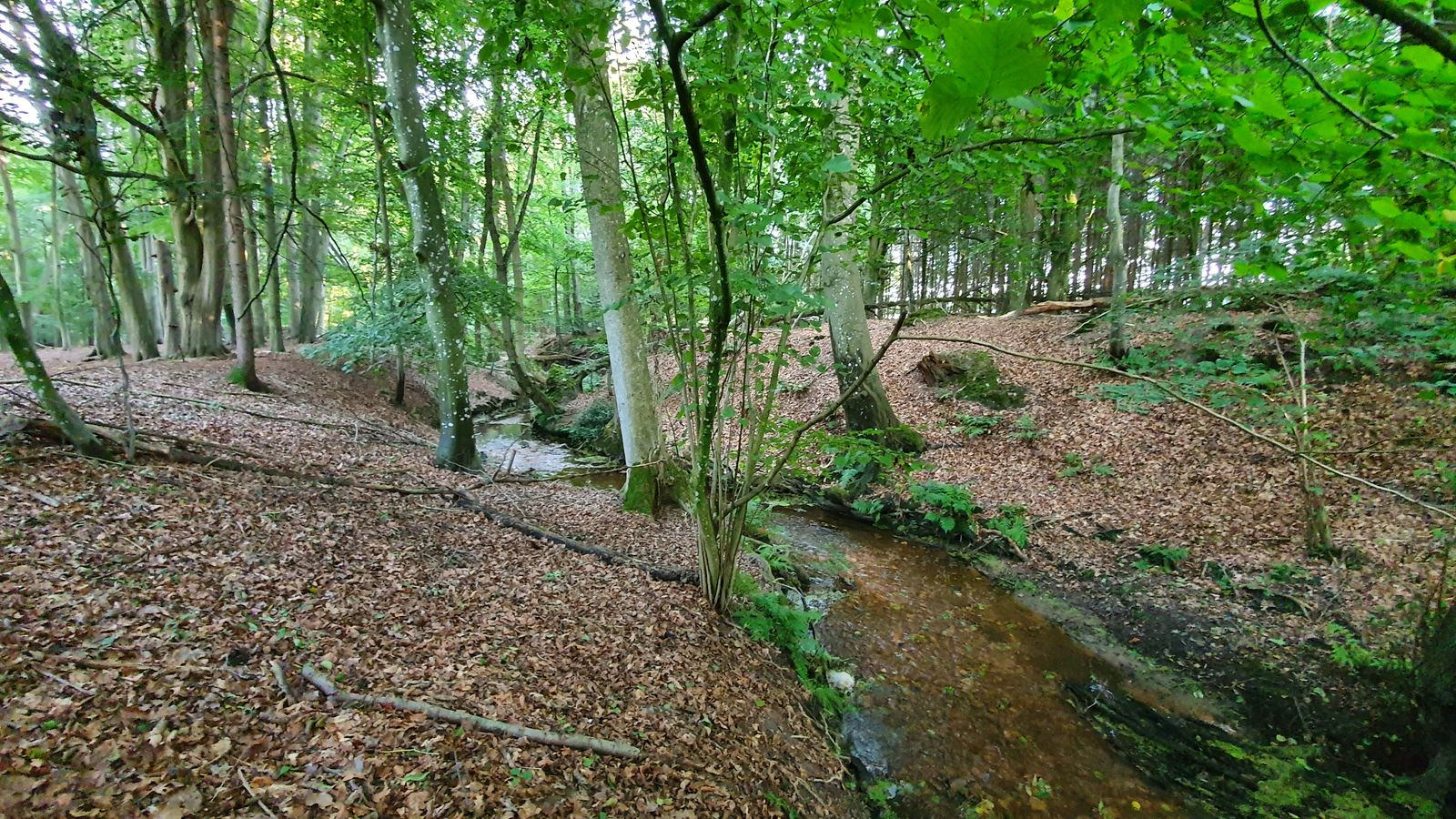

Location
- Country: Germany
- States: Lower Saxony

Physical characteristics
- Mouth
  - location: northwest of Moisburg
  - coordinates: 53.4114°N 9.6819°E

Basin features
- Progression: Este→ Elbe→ North Sea

The Goldbach (German pronunciation: [ˈɡɔltbax]; also Goldbeck) is a small river of Lower Saxony, Germany. It flows into the Este near Moisburg.

== See also ==
- List of rivers of Lower Saxony
