= Christopher, Duke of Brunswick-Harburg =

Duke of Brunswick-Lüneburg-Harburg

- Born: 21 August 1570; Harburg
- Died: 7 July 1606 (aged 35); Harburg
- Noble family: House of Guelph
- Spouse: Elisabeth of Brunswick-Wolfenbüttel
- Father: Otto II, Duke of Brunswick-Harburg
- Mother: Hedwig of East Frisia

Christopher, Duke of Brunswick-Lüneburg-Harburg, also known as Christoph or Christoffel (21 August 1570 in Harburg – 7 July 1606 in Harburg) was Duke of Brunswick-Lüneburg-Harburg.

== Life ==
Christopher was a son of Duke Otto II of Brunswick-Harburg (1528-1603) from his second marriage with Hedwig (1535-1616), daughter of Count Enno II of East Frisia. His motto was Consilio et armis ("By counsel and weapons").

After his father's death, he took over the government of Harburg jointly with his brother William Augustus. In January 1604, the town of Harburg paid homage to the brothers.

On 28 October 1604 in Harburg, Christopher married Elisabeth (1567-1618), the daughter of Duke Julius of Brunswick-Wolfenbüttel and widow of Count Adolf XI of Schaumburg. The marriage remained childless.

Christopher died two years later, in 1606, after a fall in Harburg Castle. As the eldest brother, John Frederick (1557-1619) had waived his right to govern, the youngest brother Otto III, took Christopher's position as co-ruler.

== Ancestors ==
Ancestors of Christopher, Duke of Brunswick-Harburg

8. Henry I of Lüneburg
4. Otto I, Duke of Brunswick-Lüneburg-Harburg
9. Margarete of Saxony
2. Otto II, Duke of Brunswick-Harburg
10. John III von Campe
5. Meta von Campe
1. Christopher, Duke of Brunswick-Harburg
12. Edzard I of East Frisia
6. Enno II, Count of East Frisia
13. Elisabeth of Rietberg
3. Hedwig of East Frisia
14. John V, Count of Oldenburg
7. Anna of Oldenburg
15. Anna of Anhalt-Zerbst

== Footnotes ==
Christopher, Duke of Brunswick-Harburg House of Guelph Born: 21 August 1570 Died: 7 July 1606
Preceded by Otto II	Lord of Harburg; 1603-1606; With: William Augustus	Succeeded by William Augustus and Otto III
