= Otto I of Brunswick-Harburg =

Otto I, Duke of Brunswick-Harburg
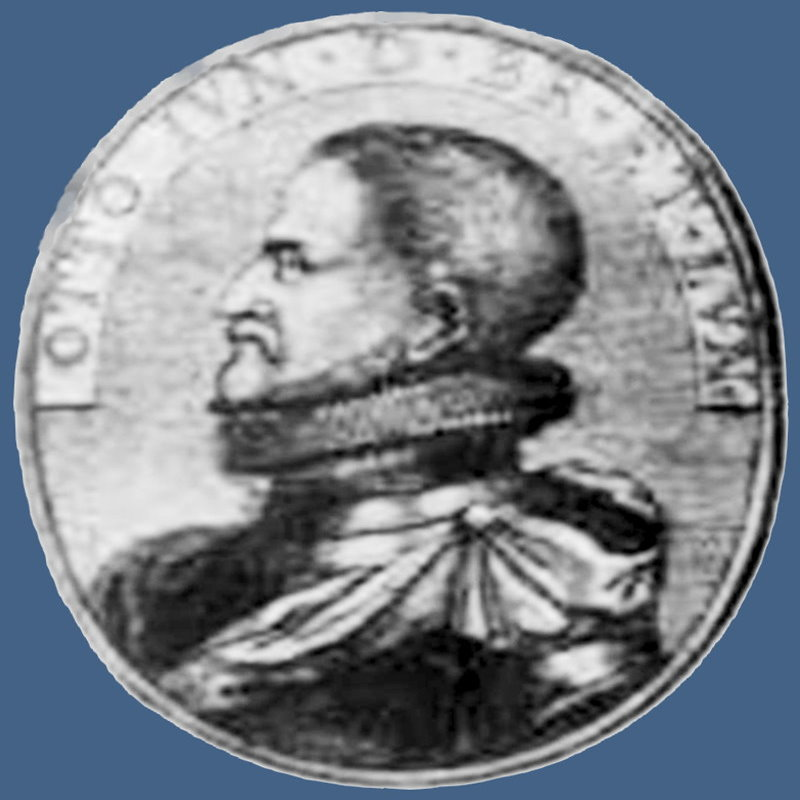
- Born: 24 August 1495
- Died: 11 August 1549 (aged 53); Harburg
- Noble family: House of Welf
- Spouse: Meta von Campe
- Issue: Otto II; Susanna
- Father: Henry the Middle, Duke of Brunswick-Lüneburg
- Mother: Margarete of Saxony

Otto, Duke of Brunswick-Lüneburg (24 August 1495 – 11 August 1549) was the Prince of Lüneburg from 1520 to 1527 and Baron of Harburg from 1527 to 1549.

== Life ==
Otto was born on 24 August 1495 as the eldest son of Henry the Middle and Margarete of Saxony. Like his brothers, Ernest and Francis he studied at Wittenberg and was affected early on by the reformatory ideas of Martin Luther and was later a driving force behind the introduction of the Reformation in the Principality of Lüneburg. When his father had to leave the state in 1520 as a result of his role in the Hildesheim Diocesan Feud and go into exile in France, Otto took over the reins of power in the principality jointly with his brother Ernest. Because the principality was seriously in debt - all the Vogteis being enfeoffed with the exception of the Schlossvogtei of Celle - a major priority during his reign was sorting out the duchy’s finances. In 1527 Otto married Meta von Campe, a woman who was below his station, and was compensated with his own domain, the Barony of Harburg. He died on 11 August 1549.

== Family ==
Otto married in 1527 to Meta von Campe (died 1580) and they had 7 children:

- Anne (1526–1527)
- Otto (1527)
- Ernest (1527–1540)
- Otto II (1528–1603)
- Frederick (1530–1533)
- Margarete (1532–1539)
- Susanna (1536–1581)

== Sources ==
- Geckler, Christa (1986). Die Celler Herzöge: Leben und Wirken 1371–1705. Celle: Georg Ströher. ISBN 3-921744-05-8. OCLC 255990175.

Otto I of Brunswick-Harburg House of Welf Cadet branch of the House of Este Born: 24 August 1495 Died: 11 August 1549
German nobility
| Preceded by Henry the Middle | Duke of Brunswick-Lüneburg; Prince of Lüneburg as Otto VI with his brother Ernest; 1520–1527 | Succeeded by Ernest the Confessor |
| New title Partition of the Lordship of Harburg | Duke of Brunswick-Lüneburg; Lord of Harburg as Otto I 1527–1549 | Succeeded by Otto II |
