= Otto III of Brunswick-Harburg =

Otto III, Duke of Brunswick-Harburg
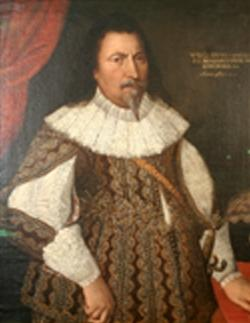
- Otto III, Duke of Brunswick-Harburg
- Born: 20 March 1572; Harburg
- Died: 4 August 1641 (aged 69); Harburg
- Noble family: House of Guelph
- Spouse: Hedwig of Brunswick-Wolfenbüttel
- Father: Otto II, Duke of Brunswick-Harburg
- Mother: Hedwig of East Frisia

Otto III, Duke of Brunswick-Lüneburg, Lord of Harburg (20 March 1572 in Harburg – 4 August 1641 in Harburg) was a titular Duke of Brunswick-Lüneburg and ruler of the apanage Brunswick-Harburg.

== Life ==
Otto was a son of Duke Otto II of Brunswick-Harburg (1528-1603) from his second marriage, with Hedwig (1535-1616), the daughter of Count Enno II of East Frisia.

After the death of his brother Christopher in 1606, Otto III and his brother William Augustus ruled Harburg jointly. Their joint reign was described as harmonious. In a treaty of 11 January 1630, the brothers renounced their right to succeed in Brunswick-Lüneburg, in favour of Christian, in exchange for Christian paying their debts, which exceeded 150000Taler.

On 14 April 1621 in Wolfenbüttel, Otto III married Hedwig (1580-1657), the daughter of Duke Julius of Brunswick-Wolfenbüttel. This marriage remained childless.

== Footnotes ==
Otto III of Brunswick-Harburg House of Guelph Born: 20 March 1572 Died: 4 August 1641
Preceded by Christopher	Duke of Brunswick-Harburg; 1606-1641	Succeeded by William Augustus
