= Wedding of Gustav II Adolf and Maria Eleonora =

1620 Swedish royal wedding

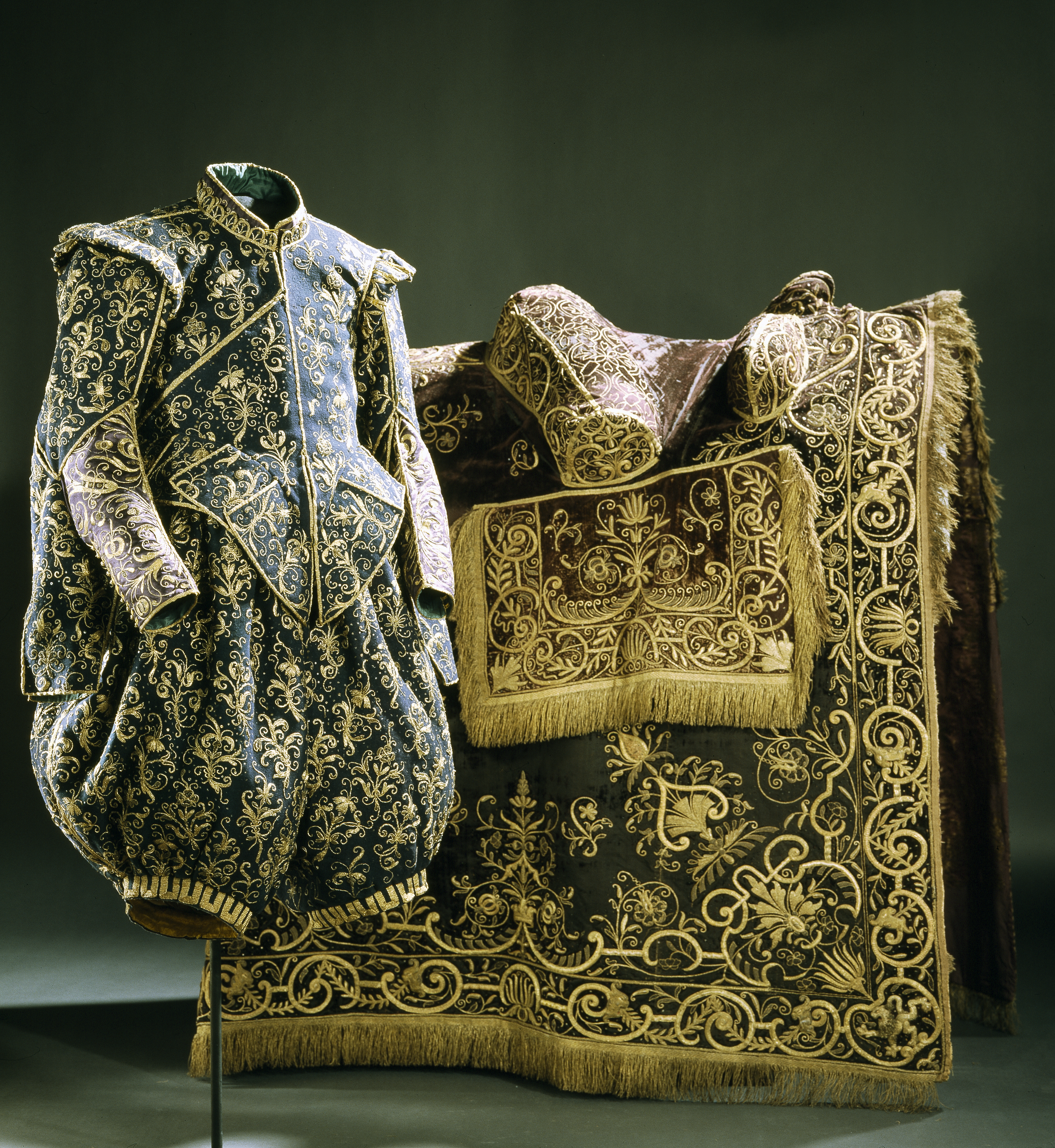
Gustav II Adolfs wedding outfit in front of the wedding saddle, Livrustkammaren.

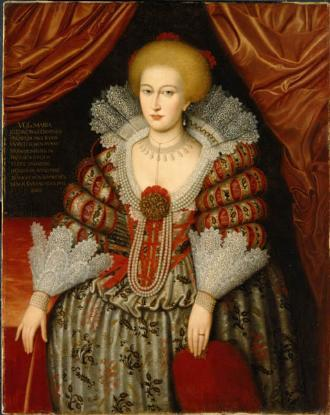
Maria Eleonora of Brandenburg in 1619, the year before the wedding.

The wedding between Gustav II Adolf of Sweden and Maria Eleonora of Brandenburg took place at the Royal Castle on November 25, 1620.

== The bridal train ==
The bridal entourage began its journey at 9.30 in the morning on November 25. In the bridal carriage was Maria Eleonora who just turned 21, and her mother Duchess Anna of Prussia. The bridal train started at Bergshamra outside of Stockholm, and in it was the bride's sister and aunt, eight maids, seven junkers and many carriages, amongst others. The train was greeted by Gustav II Adolf's impressive entourage when they reached Stockholm. The king himself came up to the bride's carriage together with Axel Oxenstierna to greet her. The bridal train continued to The Royal Castle, where the king's mother Christina of Holstein-Gottorp and the old dowager queen Catherine Stenbock met them.

== The wedding ==
In the afternoon on November 25 the bride and the groom were brought in a procession to the hall of state at the Royal Castle. First came the marshal Svante Banér and six timpanists. After them came a long line of noblemen, privy councils and more timpanists. Then came the bridal couple, followed by their mothers.

Archbishop Petrus Kenicius officiated the wedding in Swedish. After that, the couple were taken to their nuptials in a red gold-embroidered velvet bed. There the bridal couple got to eat confectionery, listen to speeches and drink wine. The hall of state was converted and made up for the wedding dinner. The festivities were ended, as they should, with the newly weds dance.

Maria Eleonora was crowned three days later in Storkyrkan in Stockholm. The festivities continued the days after the wedding and the coronation, for instance with a wedding tournament.

== Gallery ==
Caparison in Maria Eleonora's colours red and white. Made for the wedding tournament in 1620, Livrustkammaren.

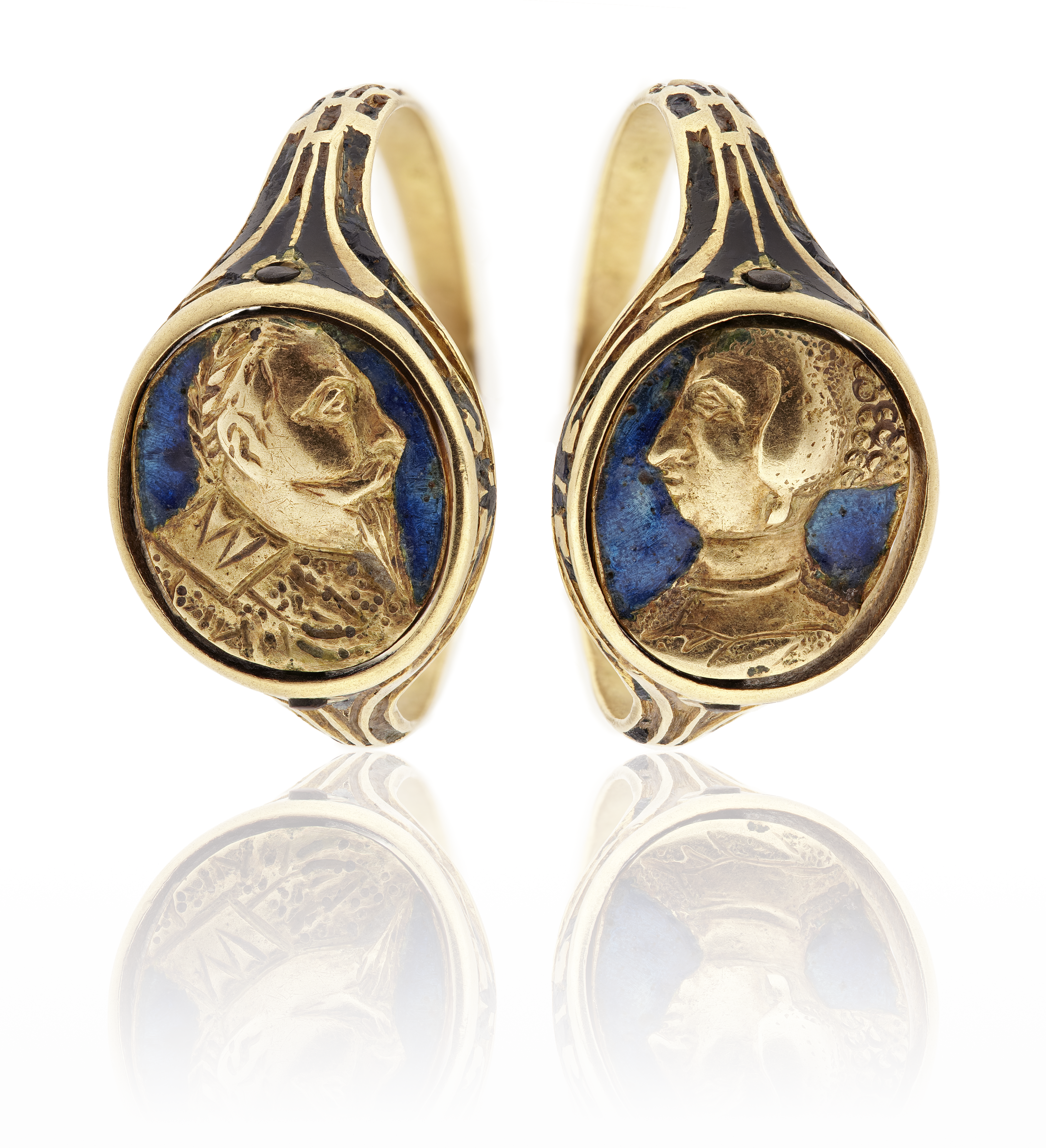
Gold ring with portraits of Maria Eleonora and Gustav II Adolf on each side of an oval medallion, made in the 1630s, Livrustkammaren.

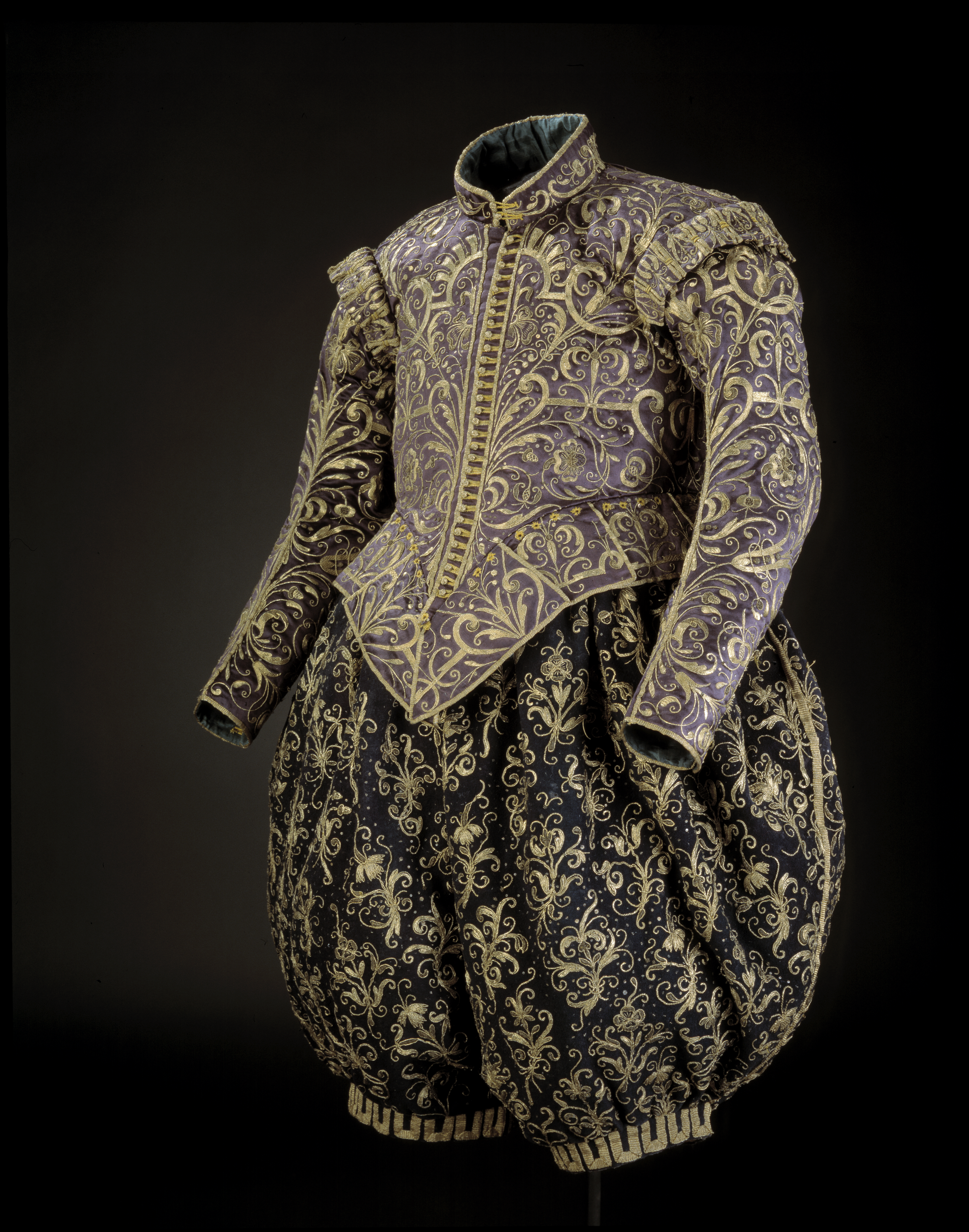
Wedding outfit worn by Gustav II Adolf, Livrustkammaren.
