= Otto II of Brunswick-Harburg =

Otto II, Duke of Brunswick-Harburg
- Born: 25 September 1528; Celle
- Died: 26 October 1603 (aged 75); Harburg
- Noble family: House of Guelph
- Spouses: Margaret of Schwarzburg-Leutenberg; Hedwig of East Frisia
- Issue: Elisabeth; Otto Henry; John Frederick; William Augustus; Enno; Anna Margarete; Hedwig; Christopher; Otto III; Johann; Elisabeth; Catherine Sophia
- Father: Otto I, Duke of Brunswick-Lüneburg-Harburg
- Mother: Metta von Campen

Otto II, Duke of Brunswick-Harburg, nicknamed the Younger, or the Famous (25 September 1528, in Celle – 26 October 1603, in Harburg) was from 1549 until his death the Duke of Brunswick-Harburg.

== Life ==
Otto was the eldest son of the Duke Otto I of Brunswick-Harburg (1495–1549) from his marriage to Metta von Campen (died 1580). Otto received a princely education.

The House of Brunswick-Lüneburg did not recognize Otto's right to inherit his father's lordship on the grounds that the marriage between his parents had been morganatic. Supported by Emperor Ferdinand I, Otto repeatedly renewed his demands and in 1560, he was finally confirmed as his father's successor as ruler of the Lordship of Harburg. His territory was even extended with neighbouring Moisburg.

Otto continued his father's construction project at Harburg Castle and transformed it into a princely residence. He moved in permanently in 1551. In 1560, he began developing the castle chapel. To finance his activities, he raised taxes and levied special taxes, which led to dissatisfaction. From 1561 to 1577, the population of his territory shrank, due to the plague. Otto did not allow Jews and Christians of other denominations to settle in his country.

He built a salt magazine, in order to promote the salt trade with Lüneburg. This, however, did not enjoy the success he had expected.

== Marriages and issue ==
On 8 September 1551, Otto married his first wife, Margaret (1530–1559), daughter of Count John Henry of Schwarzburg-Leutenberg. She died in childbirth on 16 March 1559. They had the following children:

- Elisabeth (1553–1618)

married in 1582 Count Erik Brahe of Visingsborg (1552–1614)

- Otto Henry (1555–1591)

married in 1588 Marie d'Henin-Lietard (d. 1606)

- John Frederick (born: 23 February 1557; died: 21 February 1619), waived his right to rule Harburg
- Unnamed daughter (born: 18 March 1559; died shortly after birth)

Afterwards, Otto married on 8 October 1562 with his second wife, Hedwig (1535–1616), daughter of Count Enno II of East Frisia, with whom he had the following children:

- William Augustus (1564–1642), Duke of Brunswick-Harburg
- Enno (1565–1600)
- Anna Margaret (1567–1643), Provost of the Quedlinburg Abbey
- Henry (1568–1569)
- Hedwig (1569–1620)
- Christopher (1570–1606), Duke of Brunswick-Harburg

married in 1604 princess Elisabeth of Brunswick-Wolfenbüttel (1567–1618)

- Otto III (1572–1641), Duke of Brunswick-Harburg

married in 1621 Princess Hedwig of Brunswick-Wolfenbüttel (1580–1657).

- Johann (1573–1625)
- Elisabeth (1574–1575)
- Catherine Sophia (1577–1665)

married Count Jobst Herman of Schaumburg (1575–1634)

- Frederick (1578–1605), killed in battle
- Augustus Frederick (1580–1580)

Otto of Brunswick and Lunenburg, Harburg line House of Welf Cadet branch of the House of Este Born: 25 September 1528 in Celle Died: 26 October 1603 in Harburg upon Elbe
Regnal titles
Preceded by Otto I	Lord of Harburg as Otto II; 1549–1603	Succeeded by William Augustus
