= John Sigismund, Elector of Brandenburg =

Elector of Brandenburg from 1608 to 1619

John Sigismund
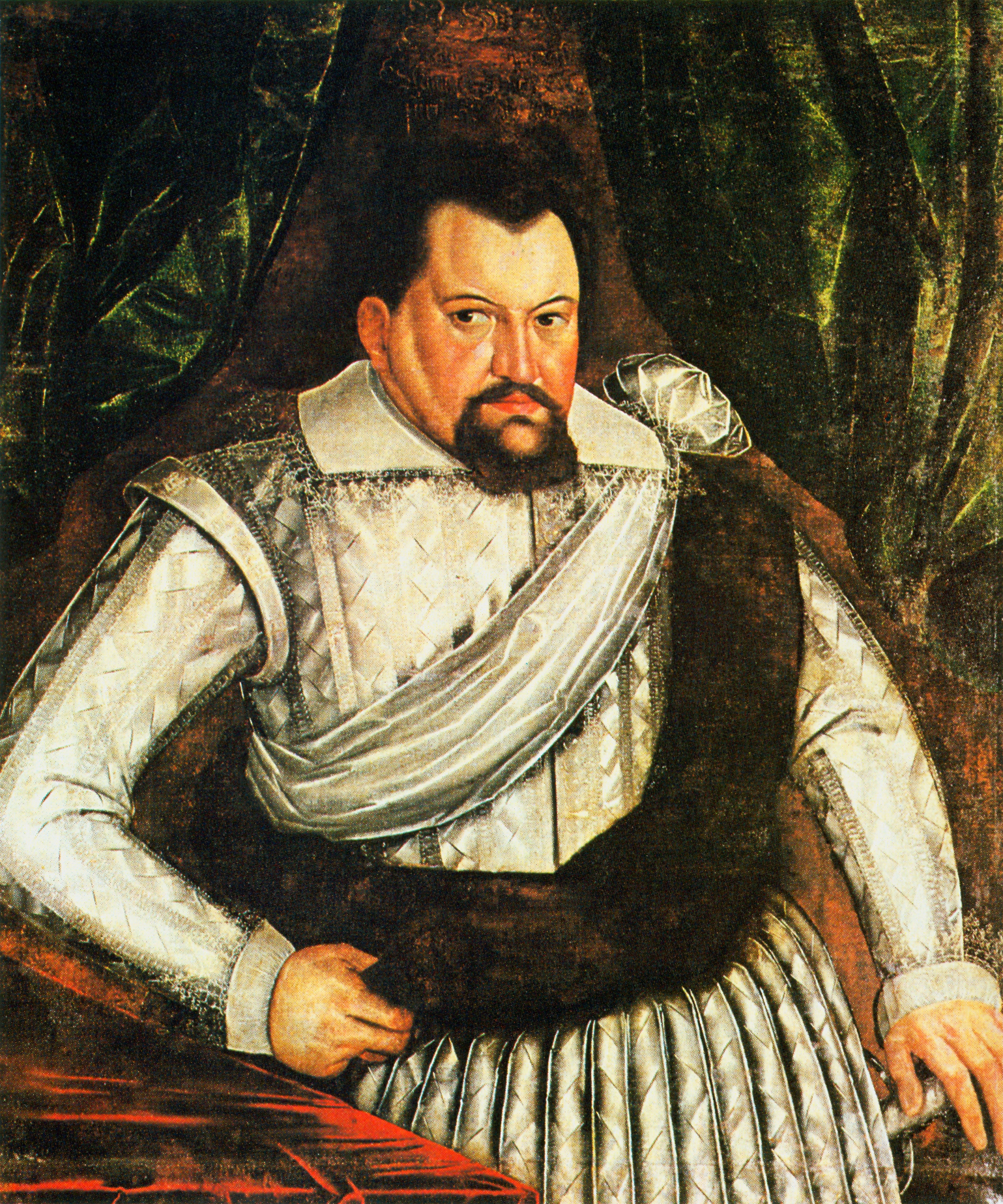
- Portrait (unknown artist, c. 1610)

Elector of Brandenburg
- Reign: 18 July 1608 – 23 December 1619
- Predecessor: Joachim Frederick
- Successor: George William

Duke of Prussia
- Reign: 28 August 1618 – 23 December 1619
- Predecessor: Albert Frederick
- Successor: George William

Duke of Cleves Count of Mark Count of Ravensburg
- Reign: 11 November 1614 – 23 December 1619
- Predecessor: John William
- Successor: Incorporated into Brandenburg
- Born: 8 November 1572; Halle, Archbishopric of Magdeburg, Holy Roman Empire
- Died: 23 December 1619 (aged 47); Berlin, Electorate of Brandenburg, Holy Roman Empire
- Burial: Berlin Cathedral
- Spouse: Anna of Prussia (m. 1594)
- Issue more...: George William, Elector of Brandenburg; Anne Sophia, Duchess of Brunswick-Lüneburg; Maria Eleonora, Queen of Sweden; Catherine, Princess of Transylvania; Joachim Sigismund of Brandenburg
- House: Hohenzollern
- Father: Joachim Frederick, Elector of Brandenburg
- Mother: Catherine of Brandenburg-Küstrin
- Religion: Calvinism prev. Lutheranism

John Sigismund (German: Johann Sigismund; 8 November 1572 – 23 December 1619) was a Prince-elector of the Margraviate of Brandenburg from the House of Hohenzollern. He became the Duke of Prussia through his marriage to Duchess Anna, the eldest daughter of Duke Albert Frederick of Prussia who died without sons. Their marriage resulted in the potential creation of Brandenburg-Prussia, which became a reality after Poland's leader appointed John Sigismund in charge of Prussia in regency and, shortly thereafter, Albert Frederick died without an able, direct male heir.

== Elector of Brandenburg and Duke of Prussia ==
John Sigismund was born in Halle an der Saale to Joachim III Frederick, Elector of Brandenburg, and his first wife Catherine of Brandenburg-Küstrin. He succeeded his father as Margrave of Brandenburg in 1608. In 1611, John Sigismund traveled from Königsberg to Warsaw, where on 16 November 1611 he gave feudal homage to Sigismund III Vasa, King of Poland (the Duchy of Prussia was a Polish fief at the time). He officially became Duke of Prussia in 1618, although he had served as regent on behalf of the mentally-disturbed Albert Frederick, Duke of Prussia, for several years prior. He suffered a stroke in 1616 from which he didn't recover and died in 1619.

John Sigismund gave the Reichshof Castrop to his teacher and educator Carl Friedrich von Bordelius. Through his wife, he became a major claimant in the War of the Julich Succession. He received the territories of Cleves, Mark, and Ravensberg in the Treaty of Xanten in 1614.

== Religious policy ==
John Sigismund's most significant action was his conversion from Lutheranism to Calvinism, after he had earlier equalized the rights of Catholics and Protestants in the Duchy of Prussia under pressure from the King of Poland. He probably became Calvinist during a visit to Heidelberg in 1606, but it was not until 25 December 1613 that he publicly took communion according to the Calvinist rite. The vast majority of his subjects in Brandenburg, including his wife Anna of Prussia, remained deeply Lutheran, however. After the Elector and his Calvinist court officials drew up plans for mass conversion of the population to the new faith in February 1614, as provided for by the rule of Cuius regio, eius religio within the Holy Roman Empire, there were serious protests, with his wife backing the Lutherans. Resistance was so strong that in 1615, John Sigismund backed down and relinquished all attempts at forcible conversion. Instead, he allowed his subjects to be either Lutheran or Calvinist according to the dictates of their own consciences. Henceforward, Brandenburg-Prussia would be a bi-confessional state.

== Family and children ==
On 30 October 1594, John Sigismund married Anna of Prussia, daughter of Albert Frederick, Duke of Prussia (1553–1618). She was the elder sister of his stepmother. They were parents to eight children:

- George William of Brandenburg (13 November 1595 – 1 December 1640). His successor.
- Anna Sophia of Brandenburg (18 March 1598 – 19 December 1659). Married Frederick Ulrich, Duke of Brunswick-Lüneburg.
- Maria Eleonora of Brandenburg (11 November 1599 – 28 March 1655). Married Gustavus Adolphus of Sweden. They were parents of Christina of Sweden.
- Catherine of Brandenburg (28 May 1602 – 27 August 1649). Married first Gabriel Bethlen, Prince of Transylvania and secondly Franz Karl of Saxe-Lauenburg.
- Joachim Sigismund of Brandenburg (25 July 1603 – 22 February 1625) died aged 21, unmarried and without issue.
- Agnes of Brandenburg (31 August 1606 – 12 March 1607) died in infancy.
- John Frederick of Brandenburg (18 August 1607 – 1 March 1608) died in infancy.
- Albrecht Christian of Brandenburg (7–14 March 1609) died in infancy.

John Sigismund, Elector of Brandenburg House of Hohenzollern Born: 8 November 1572 Died: 23 December 1619
Regnal titles
Preceded by Joachim Frederick	Elector of Brandenburg; 1608–1619	Succeeded by George William
Preceded by Albert Frederick	Duke of Prussia; 1618–1619	Succeeded by George William
Vacant Treaty of Xanten Title last held by John William	Duke of Cleves, Count of Mark, Count of Ravensburg; 1614–1619	Incorporated into Brandenburg
