= Este (river) =

River in Germany

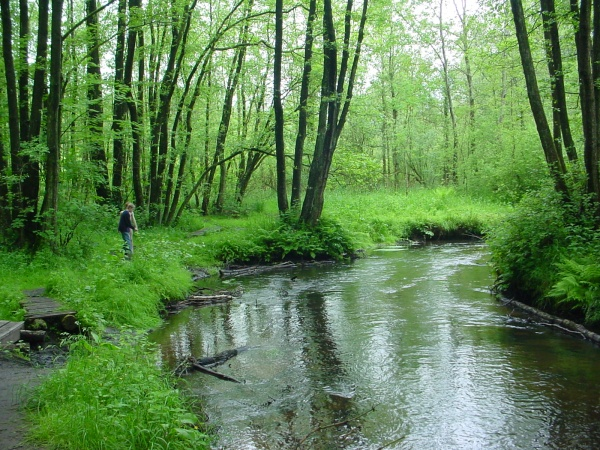
- The Este near Kakenstorf

Location
- Country: Germany
- States: Lower Saxony, Hamburg

Physical characteristics
- Mouth
  - location: joins Elbe at Cranz, Hamburg
  - coordinates: 53.5362°N 9.7911°E
- Length: 63.6 km (39.5 mi)
- Basin size: 361 km^{2} (139 sq mi)
- Discharge
  - average: 3.21 m^{3}/s (113 cu ft/s)

Basin features
- Progression: Elbe→ North Sea
- Tributaries
  - left: Goldbach

The Este (German pronunciation: [ˈɛstə]; Low Saxon: Eest) is a 63.6-kilometre-long (39.5 mi) left-bank tributary of the river Elbe that flows through Lower Saxony and Hamburg, Germany.

== See also ==
- List of rivers of Hamburg
- List of rivers of Lower Saxony
