= Anna Sophia of Brandenburg =

German Noblewoman

- Duchess of Brunswick-Lüneburg
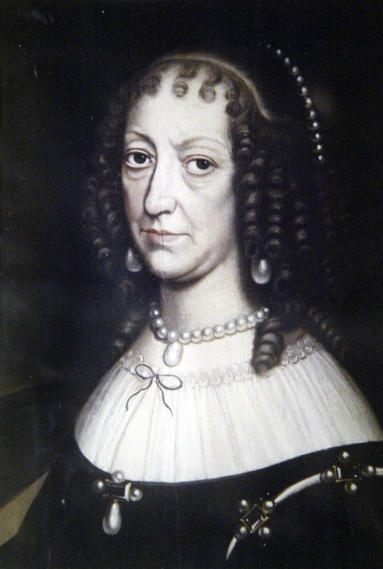
- Anna Sophia of Brandenburg (c. 1650)
- Born: 18 March 1598; Berlin
- Died: 19 December 1659 (aged 61); Berlin
- Burial: Berlin Cathedral
- Spouse: Frederick Ulrich, Duke of Brunswick-Lüneburg
- House: Hohenzollern
- Father: Johann Sigismund of Brandenburg
- Mother: Anna of Prussia

Anna Sophia of Brandenburg (18 March 1598 – 19 December 1659) was, through her marriage to Frederick Ulrich of Brunswick-Lüneburg, a duchess of Braunschweig and Lüneburg, and princess of Braunschweig-Wolfenbüttel. She was born a German princess as the daughter of John Sigismund, Elector of Brandenburg, and Anna, Duchess of Prussia, the daughter of Albert Frederick, Duke of Prussia.

== Life ==
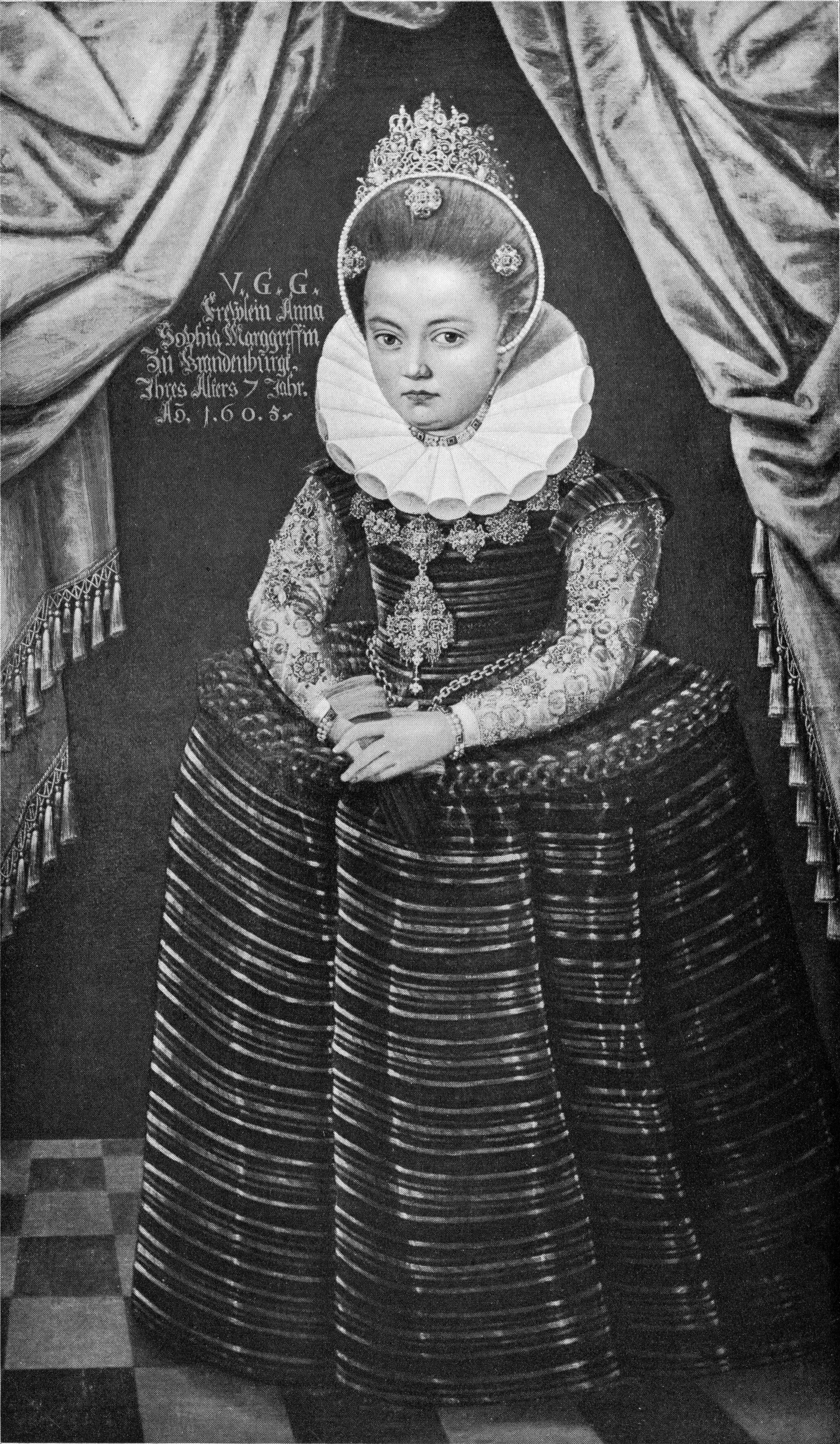
Anna Sophia as a child by Daniel Rose (1605)

Anna Sophia was born on 18 March 1598 in Cölln, as the eldest daughter of Johann Sigismund of Brandenburg and Duchess Anna of Prussia. Anna Sophia's maternal grandparents were Marie Eleonore of Cleves and Albert Frederick of Prussia, while her paternal grandparents were Joachim Frederick, Margrave of Brandenburg and his first wife Catherine of Brandenburg-Küstrin.

The relationship between her parents was said to be occasionally volatile; her father was prone to drunken rages and her mother reportedly threw plates and glasses at her spouse during arguments. Although Anna was described as intellectually superior to her spouse, she was also considered temperamental and strong-willed. Anna was in charge of her daughters education, and while the particulars of their education is not well-documented they were taught to write and read in German and instructed in religion.

After the death of Anna Sophia's childless great-uncle, John William, Duke of Jülich-Cleves-Berg in 1609, his inheritance and the succession rights was claimed by the heirs of his two sisters,, his niece Anna of Prussia, Anna Sophia's mother, and his sister Anna of Cleves (1552–1632), married to Philipp Ludwig, Count Palatine of Neuburg, whose son and heir was Wolfgang Wilhelm, Count Palatine of Neuburg.

The idea of a marriage between Anna Sophia and Wolfgang Wilhelm had first been raised in 1610 during the meeting of the Protestant union in Schwäbisch Hall, but Anna Sophias mother was against such a match, while Wolfgang Wilhelm himself was hoping to make a marriage with the English princess Elizabeth Stuart or a Bavarian princess.

It was not until 1612/13 that serious marriage negotiations between Johann Sigismund and Wolfgang Wilhelm for Anna Sophias hand in marriage were begun. At that time Julich-Cleve was under the joint rule of both Wolfgang Wilhelm and Johann Sigismund as a result of the Treaty of Dortmund. This joint rule was in theory only meant to last until the dispute was settled.

Troubles began, when Wolfgang Wilhelm demanded an end to the joint rule and that the lands would be given as Anna Sophia's dowry and thereafter ruled solely by Wolfgang Wilhelm.As this demand seemed somewhat immodest to Johann Sigismund, a heated exchange of words arose between Wolfgang Wilhelm and Johann Sigismund, as a result of which Wolfgang Wilhelm left "after suffering a serious insult, threatening revenge with no uncertain terms.".

The engagement with Anna Sophia suddenly broken off, Wolfgang Wilhelm instead married Magdelene of Bavaria, converted to Catholicism, and allied himself with the Habsburgs.

In 1613, Johann Sigismund converted to Calvinism while his wife and daughters remained staunchly Lutheran.

== Marriage ==
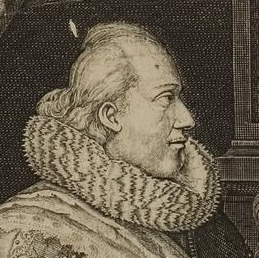
Friedrich Ulrich

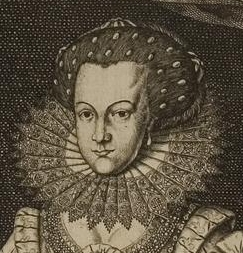
Anna Sophia

In September 1614, Anna Sophia was married to Frederick Ulrich, Duke of Brunswick-Lüneburg. The wedding festivities included a ballet and a concert with cornettists,which the court chief musician Michael Praetorius had specially composed pieces for.

Seven years older than Anna Sophia, Friedrich was interested in the martial arts and much "devoted to the pleasures of the table" was an alcoholic, who it was said was so uninterested in ruling that he would sign any paper of government put before him without reading it. The marriage would turn out to be unhappy and childless.It was also thought that Friedrich Ulrich was impotent.

Just two years after their marriage, owing to his diminished capability as a ruler, he was deposed by his mother (Anna Sophia's mother-in-law), Elizabeth of Denmark, with the help of Frederick Julius' maternal uncle, King Christian IV of Denmark. The rule of Anna Sophia´s mother-in-law would last between 1615-1622. Anna Sophia and her mother-in-law did not get along.

In 1620, Anna Sophia sheltered her sister Maria Eleonora in Braunschweig and supported her marriage to Gustavus Adolphus of Sweden. Their brother George William did not approve of his sister's marriage because it would jeopardize Brandenburg's status as neutral and antagonizing their Polish neighbours and drag them into the Thirty Years' War.

Anna Sophia´s relationship to Frederick Ulrich having broken down completely, in 1622 she began a love affair with a relative of her husband who lived at the Brunswick court, army officer Francis Albert of Saxen-Lauenburg. The relationship was kept secret for a while, until in 1623, after he had been defeated in a battle at Plesse, his belongings were looted by Anna Sophia's brother-in-law, Christian of Halberstadt. Christian found several incriminating letters from Anna Sophia to her lover talking about her hatred for her husband, her husband's family, and her support for the Catholic side of the conflict in the Thirty Years' War. In one of the letters Anna Sophia had allegedly mentioned that she wished her husband would "break his neck",this was interpreted as plans for an assassination attempt on Friedrich Ulrich. Christian,sent these letters on to his mother Elizabeth.

When Anna Sophia was alerted that the letters had fallen into her mother-in-laws hand, upretense of a family visit, left Brunswick in the middle of july 1623 and returned to her family in Berlin. Well in safety in her native land, she wrote to her relative Emperor Ferdinand II that her husband had deprived her of "his marital affections and heart".

The negotiaions dragged on until 1634 when Fredrick died from complications of a double leg fracture before the divorce was completed. Shortly before his death he asked the court preacher Tuckermann in Schöningen to convey a message to his estranged wife.

Anna Sophia would later manage to gain control of her dower lands Schöningen, Hessen, Jerxheim, and Calvörde. Anna Sophia, widowed, retired to Schöningen, In 1638, Anna Sophia acquired a building in Schönigen in order to set up a Latin school there. At Easter 1640, the schoolm named the Anna-Sophianeum opened and would remain in operation until the 21th century.

=== Activities during the Thirty Years' War ===
In order to protect her estates from looting during the wars, Anna Sophia kept up a correspondence with Ferdinand II ,imperial commanders Wallenstein and Johan t'Serclaes, Count of Tilly as well as other members of her vast network, She also negotiated prisoner of war exchanges on behalf of Brandenburg.

== Later life ==
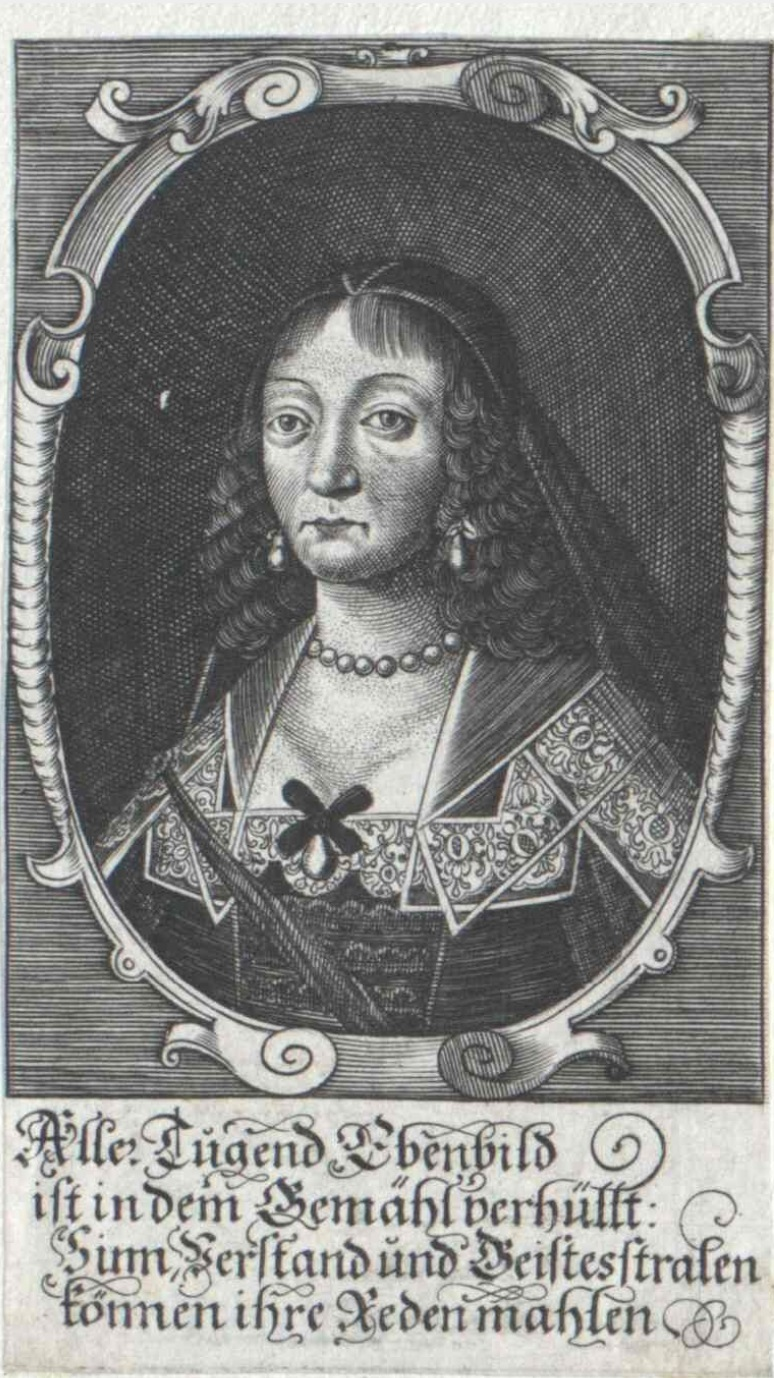

In 1625 Anna Sophia's mother, Anna of Prussia, died. This was followed by the betrothal of Anna Sophia's youngest sister, Catherine, to the Transylvanian prince Gabriel Bethlen. After the proxy marriage, the bride set off for Transylvania, accompanied by Anna Sophia.

While visiting Anna Sophia in 1649, her sister Catherine died in the court of Anna Sophia in Schöningen.

== Death ==
Beginning in early 1650, Anna Sophia's health and mental capacities began to deteriorate. From 1655, she lived permanently in Berlin under close supervision and in confinement, with her mood alternating between "melancholy, violence and normality".

== Ancestry ==
Ancestors of Anna Sophia of Brandenburg

8. John George, Elector of Brandenburg
4. Joachim Frederick, Elector of Brandenburg
9. Sophie of Legnica
2. John Sigismund, Elector of Brandenburg
10. John, Margrave of Brandenburg-Küstrin
5. Catherine of Brandenburg-Küstrin
11. Catherine of Brunswick-Wolfenbüttel
1. Anna Sophia of Brandenburg
12. Albert, Duke of Prussia
6. Albert Frederick, Duke of Prussia
13. Anna Maria of Brunswick-Calenberg-Göttingen
3. Duchess Anna of Prussia
14. William, Duke of Jülich-Cleves-Berg
7. Marie Eleonore of Cleves
15. Archduchess Maria of Austria
