= Duke Otto Henry of Brunswick-Harburg =

- Born: 16 June 1555; Harburg
- Died: 15 October 1591 (aged 36); Brussels
- Noble family: House of Guelph
- Spouse: Marie d'Henin-Lietard
- Father: Otto II, Duke of Brunswick-Harburg
- Mother: Margaret of Schwarzburg-Leutenberg

Duke Otto Henry of Brunswick-Lüneburg-Harburg (16 June 1555 in Harburg – 15 October 1591 in Brussels), was a member of House of Guelph and the heir apparent of Brunswick-Lüneburg-Harburg.

== Life ==
Otto Henry was the eldest son of the Duke Otto II of Brunswick-Harburg (1528–1603) from his first marriage with Margaret (1530–1559), the daughter of the Count John Henry of Schwarzburg-Leutenberg.

Otto Henry was educated under his father's strict supervision. He was taught science, but Otto II had strictly forbidden the instruction of fine arts. Otto Henry studied at the University of Strasbourg, and was a canon at Bremen for a while, but then chose a military career. In 1590, he led the cavalry of the Duke Alessandro Farnese in the Eighty Years' War and showed great courage in the battle of Ivry on 14 March 1590. He was seriously wounded in this battle.

Otto Henry died a year later, in Brussels in 1591 at the age of 36. Since he died before his father, he never inherited Harburg.

== Marriage and issue ==
Otto Henry married in 1588 with Marie d'Henin-Lietard (d. 1606), the daughter of Count Jean de Bossu, with whom he had a son. However, since this was a morganatic marriage, his son was not able to inherit Harburg.

- Charles (d. 1620), Governor of Beaumont in Luxembourg; married in 1618 with Marie Wouters, heiress of Terdeck and Dyck (d. 1619)
