= Frederick Ulrich, Duke of Brunswick-Lüneburg =

Frederick Ulrich
- Duke of Brunswick-Lüneburg, Prince of Brunswick-Wolfenbüttel
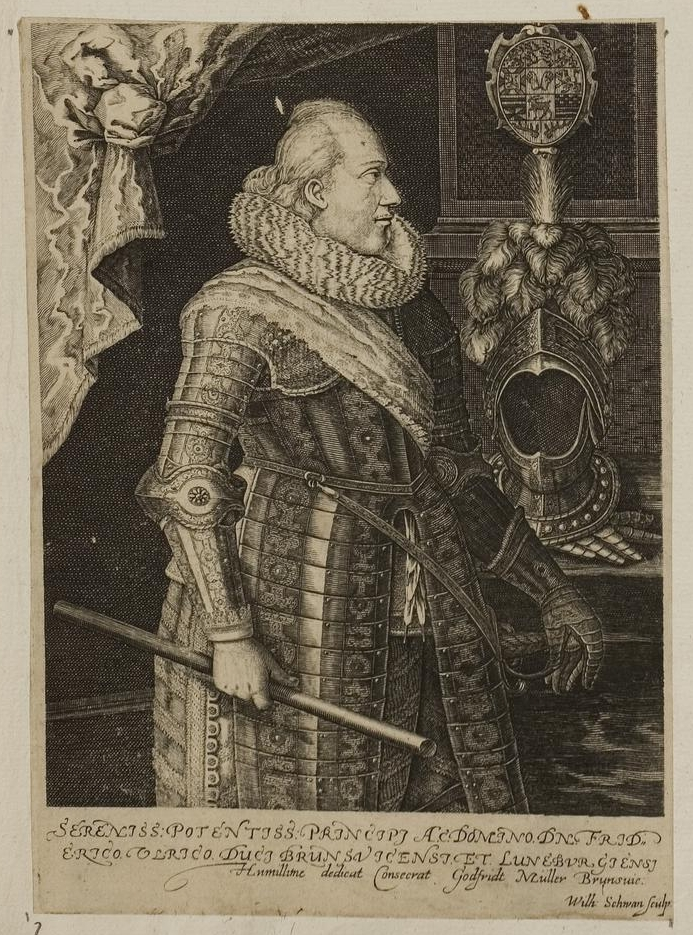

Prince of Brunswick-Wolfenbüttel
- Reign: 30 July 1613 – 11 August 1634
- Predecessor: Henry Julius
- Successor: Augustus II
- Born: 5 April 1591; Wolfenbüttel
- Died: 11 August 1634 (aged 43); Brunswick
- Spouse: Anna Sophia of Brandenburg (m. 1614)
- House: Welf
- Father: Henry Julius, Duke of Brunswick-Lüneburg
- Mother: Elizabeth of Denmark
- Religion: Lutheran

Frederick Ulrich (German Friedrich Ulrich, 5 April 1591 – 11 August 1634), Duke of Brunswick-Lüneburg, was prince of Wolfenbüttel from 1613 until his death.

== Life ==
Frederick Ulrich was the son of Duke Henry Julius of Brunswick-Wolfenbüttel and his second wife Princess Elisabeth of Denmark, the eldest daughter of King Frederick II of Denmark. Frederick studied at the universities of Helmstedt and Tübingen.

=== England in 1610 ===
In March 1610 he visited his aunt Anne of Denmark in England, staying at St James Palace with Prince Henry, who took him to see the ship the Prince Royal being built at Woolwich. He took a tour of the South West, visiting Oxford, Gloucester, Bath, and Bristol where news of the assassination of Henry IV of France reached him and ended his tour. The poet Sir David Murray, a gentleman of the household of Prince Henry, managed part of the tour, using £1,000 for expenses. He attended the masques London's Love to Prince Henry and Tethys' Festival. In April he performed in a tournament "running at the ring." The Prince of Wales gave him his portrait painted by Isaac Oliver. James VI and I gave him a jewel and a ring which the duke gave to Princess Elizabeth, bought for £1,900 from Peter Vanlore. After Prince Henry's death in 1612 the duke was sent a suit of gilt armour.

=== Duke of Brunswick-Lüneburg ===
He became ruling duke after the death of his father in 1613. In 1615, Frederick became involved in a war with the City of Brunswick, which was reluctant to recognize his overlordship.

Between 1616 and 1622, he was de facto deposed by his mother, Elizabeth, with the help of her brother, King Christian IV of Denmark, because of his alcoholism; government business was led by Anton von Streithorst, who nearly ruined the state by minting coins from cheap metals and thus causing inflation. Because of the bad situation of the state, Christian had Frederick take control of the government again. With the help of the states' nobility, he managed to regain control; the members of the Streithorst government fled the state.

Because of Frederick's indecision and weakness, Brunswick was heavily ransacked during the Thirty Years' War—both by the Catholic forces of Tilly and Pappenheim and by the Protestant forces of Christian of Denmark and Gustavus Adolphus of Sweden. The duke lost most of his territory during this time. He died after an accident in 1634. The principality was eventually ceded to Augustus the Younger in 1635.

== Marriage and family ==
Frederick Ulrich married Anna Sophia, daughter of John Sigismund, Elector of Brandenburg, in 1614. They had no children and Frederick tried to get a divorce from Anna, though he died before the divorce was complete. Anna Sophia spent her widowhood in Schöningen, where she founded a school, the Anna-Sophianeum.

Frederick Ulrich, Duke of Brunswick-Lüneburg House of Welf Cadet branch of the House of Este Born: 5 April 1591 Died: 11 August 1634
Regnal titles
Preceded by Henry Julius	Duke of Brunswick-Lüneburg; Prince of Brunswick-Wolfenbüttel; 1613–1634	Succeeded by Augustus the Younger
Preceded by Henry Julius	Duke of Brunswick-Lüneburg; Prince of Calenberg; 1613–1634	Succeeded by George
Preceded by Henry Julius	Duke of Brunswick-Lüneburg; Prince of Grubenhagen only de facto, not de jure 1613–1617	Succeeded by Christian the Elder
