= Braunschweig (region) =

Coordinates: 52°10′N 10°30′E

- Regierungsbezirk
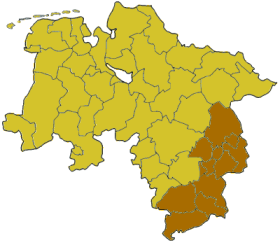
- Map of Lower Saxony highlighting Braunschweig
- Country: Germany
- State: Lower Saxony
- Disestablished: 2004-12-31
- Region seat: Braunschweig

Area
  - Total: 8,098.5 km^{2} (3,126.8 sq mi)

Population (30 Sep. 2004)
  - Total: 1,659,396
  - Density: 204.90/km^{2} (530.69/sq mi)

GDP
  - Total: €80.363 billion (2021)

Braunschweig (German Regierungsbezirk Braunschweig) was one of the eight former administrative regions (Regierungsbezirke) of Lower Saxony, Germany. It was located in the southeast of the state.

The region covers roughly the area of the former state of Brunswick-Lüneburg. It was founded in 1978 out of 'Verwaltungsbezirk Braunschweig'. At the end of 2004, all Regierungsbezirke of Lower Saxony were dissolved.

The other seven were Regierungsbezirk Aurich, Regierungsbezirk Hannover, Regierungsbezirk Hildesheim, Regierungsbezirk Lüneburg, Regierungsbezirk Osnabrück, Regierungsbezirk Stade and Regierungsbezirk Weser-Ems. 'Verwaltungsbezirk Oldenburg' was dissolved in June 1977 and became part of Regierungsbezirk Weser-Ems.

The region of Braunschweig was (2005/6) the most R&D-intensive area in the whole European Economic Area investing 7.1% of its GDP for research & technology.

== Districts from 1978 to 2004 ==
Kreise
(districts)

1. Gifhorn
2. Goslar
3. Göttingen
4. Helmstedt
5. Northeim
6. Osterode
7. Peine
8. Wolfenbüttel

Kreisfreie Städte
(district-free towns)

1. Braunschweig (Brunswick)
2. Salzgitter
3. Wolfsburg
