= Moisburg =

- Municipality
- Coat of arms

- Location of Moisburg within Harburg district
- Interactive map of Moisburg
- Location within Germany Location within Lower Saxony
- Coordinates: 53°24′N 09°42′E
- Country: Germany
- State: Lower Saxony
- District: Harburg
- Municipal assoc.: Hollenstedt
- Subdivisions: 3

Government
  - Mayor: Ronald Doll

Area
  - Total: 11.25 km^{2} (4.34 sq mi)
- Elevation: 15 m (49 ft)

Population (2025-12-31)
  - Total: 2,078
  - Density: 184.7/km^{2} (478.4/sq mi)
- Time zone: UTC+01:00 (CET)
  - Summer (DST): UTC+02:00 (CEST)
- Postal codes: 21647
- Dialling codes: 04165
- Vehicle registration: WL

Moisburg is a municipality in the district of Harburg, in Lower Saxony, Germany.

== History ==
From 1972 to 2015, there was a disco with a capacity of 5000 in Moisburg called MicMac which was described as legendary and as having cult status. It was demolished in 2024.
