= Harburg (quarter) =

- Quarter of Hamburg
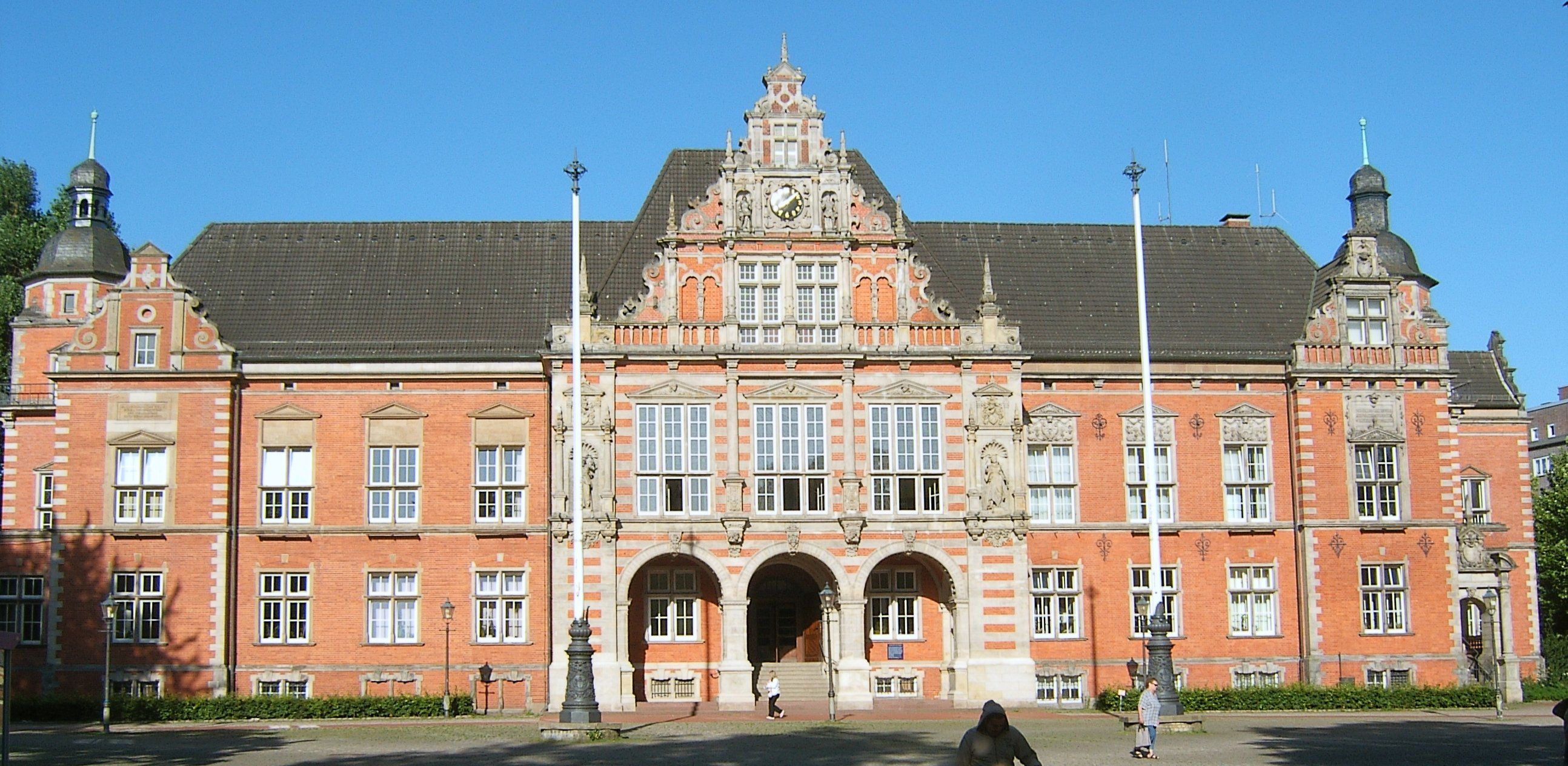
- The town hall

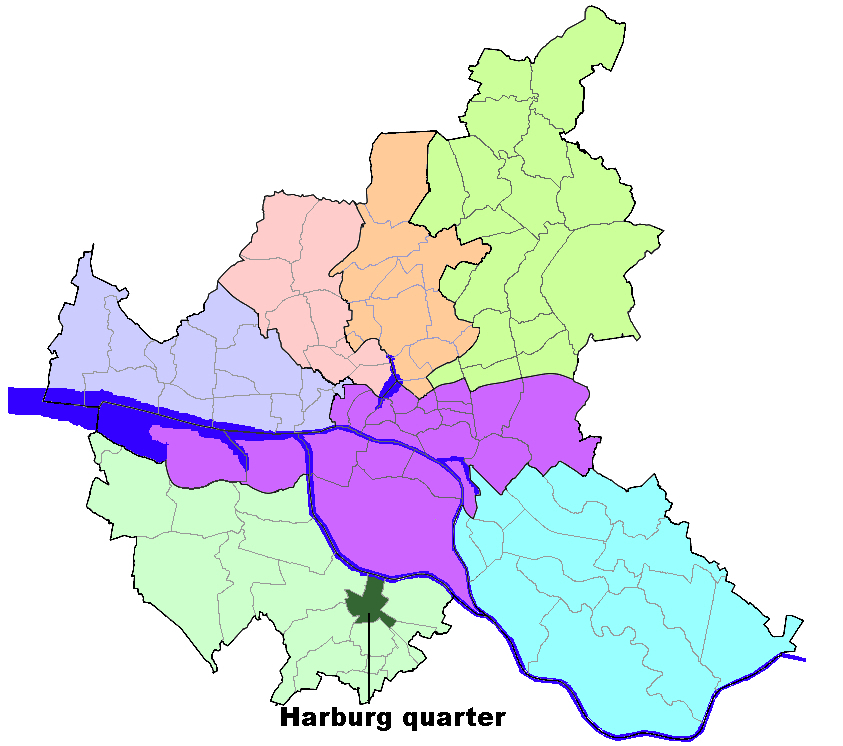
- Location of Harburg in the city of Hamburg
- Interactive map of Harburg
- Location within Germany Location within Hamburg
- Coordinates: 53°28′00″N 09°59′00″E
- Country: Germany
- State: Hamburg
- City: Hamburg
- Borough: Harburg

Area
  - Total: 3.9 km^{2} (1.5 sq mi)

Population (2024-12-31)
  - Total: 29,237
  - Density: 7,500/km^{2} (19,000/sq mi)
- Time zone: UTC+01:00 (CET)
  - Summer (DST): UTC+02:00 (CEST)
- Dialling codes: 040
- Vehicle registration: HH

Harburg (German pronunciation: [ˈhaːɐ̯bʊʁk]) is a quarter (Stadtteil) in the Harburg borough (Bezirk) of Hamburg, Germany. It used to be the capital of the Harburg district in Lower Saxony. In 2020, the population was 25,979.

== History ==
A castle named Horeburg, meaning swamp castle, was probably erected by the counts of Stade, to secure the eastern border of the county. The oldest records mentioning the castle date back to 1133 and 1137. Outside the castle a settlement developed. As to religion Harburg belonged to the Diocese of Verden (till 1648). In 1257 the area became part of the Duchy of Brunswick and Lunenburg. After its dynastic partition in 1267 Harburg was part of the Brunswick-Lunenburgian Principality of Lunenburg (Celle). In 1288 the settlement outside the castle was granted municipal rights and in 1297 town privileges. The town was then the centre of the Bailiwick of Harburg (Vogtei Harburg).

After Duke Otto (1495–1549), who co-ruled Lunenburg-Celle with his brother Duke Ernest I the Confessor, had married a woman unconformable to his rank, he was urged to retire from co-ruling the principality in 1527. Otto could reach an agreement, allowing him and his family to live in Harburg castle and to rule his own precinct, the Bailiwick of Harburg, however, as a subfief of Lunenburg-Celle. Thus Harburg became the capital of the Principality of Harburg, which continued to exist under Otto's son, Duke Otto II of Harburg (1528–1603) and grandson Duke William Augustus (1564–1642). With the latter's death the Brunswick-Lunenburgian branch of Harburg was extinct in the male line and the area reunited with Lunenburg-Celle proper.

In 1705 the Lunenburg-Celle line was extinct and the principality inherited by Duke George Louis of Brunswick and Lunenburg (Calenberg), ruling the Principality of Calenberg, which managed to be upgraded as Electorate of Brunswick and Lunenburg, colloquially named after its capital Electorate of Hanover, in 1708. In 1714 Prince-Elector George Louis ascended the British throne as George I, ruling Hanover and Britain in personal union.

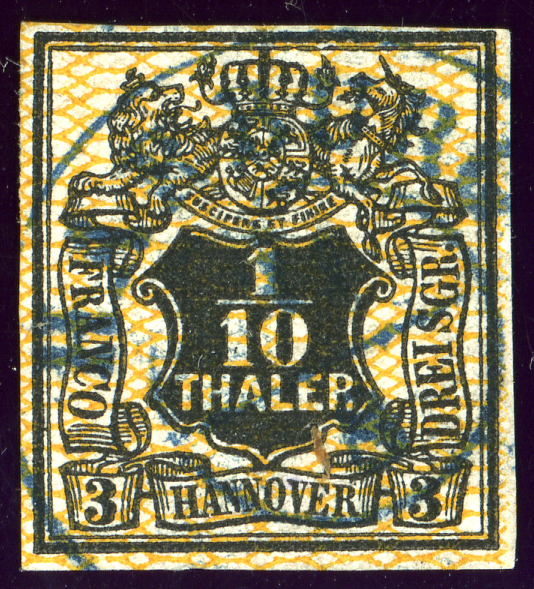
Postmark HARBURG in the Kingdom of Hanover, 1856

During this period (in 1720–23) the town was the notional headquarters of the abortive Harburg Company which, with a charter from King George I of Great Britain and funded by a dubious lottery scheme, was supposed to deepen the river and improve the harbour. When the lottery was forbidden to operate in England as fraudulent and illegal, the scheme foundered. Its principal proponent, John Barrington, was expelled from the British Parliament.

During the Great French War Harburg suffered changing conquests, liberations and occupations, until it was first annexed by Westphalia (1807), only to be annexed by France in 1810. Harburg then became the capital of the Canton d'Harbourg within the Arrondissement de Lunebourg of the Département des Bouches-de-l'Elbe. After the French defeat in 1813 Harburg returned to Hanover, which was upgraded to the Kingdom of Hanover in 1814. The Hanoveran-British personal union ended in 1837. Hanover, including Harburg, was defeated in the German War of Brothers and annexed by Prussia in 1866 (now a part of the Province of Hanover), joining united Germany in 1871. Since the 19th century the town has been distinguished as Harburg upon Elbe (Harburg an der Elbe or Harburg/Elbe) from the homonymous town in Bavaria.

With the defeat of Germany and the abdication of the monarchs in Germany in 1918, Prussia adopted a democratic government as a German state and was formally named Free State of Prussia. In 1927 Harburg/Elbe merged with Wilhelmsburg into Harburg-Wilhelmsburg. On 1 April 1937 Harburg-Wilhelmsburg was disentangled from Prussia – according to the "Greater Hamburg Act" – and ceded to the state of Hamburg, which on 1 April 1938 incorporated the city into a unitary city state municipality (Einheitsgemeinde), thus abolishing Harburg(-Wilhelmsburg)'s municipal independence dating back to 1288.

== Geography ==
In 2006 according to the statistical office of Hamburg and Schleswig-Holstein, the quarter had an area of 3.9 km^{2} (1.5 mi^{2}). Harburg, situated in the southern side of Hamburg, borders with the quarters of Neuland, Gut Moor, Rönneburg, Wilstorf, Eißendorf, Heimfeld and Wilhelmsburg (in the district of Mitte). From this one it is physically separated by the river Elbe.

== Demographics ==
The population of Harburg in 2006 was 21,193. The population density was 5,500/km^{2} (14,000/sq mi). 14.3% were children under the age of 18, and 14.1% were 65 years of age or older. 31.3% were immigrants. 1,619 people were registered as unemployed. In 1999 there were 11,668 households, out of which 16% had children under the age of 18 living with them, and 55% of all households were made up of individuals. The average household size was 1.76.

Population by year

1987	1988	1989	1990	1991	1992	1993
19,000	19,202	19,672	20,069	20,405	20,151	20,382

1994	1995	1996	1997	1998	1999	2000
20,430	20,513	20,373	20,282	20,126	19,988	20,085

2001	2002	2003	2004	2005	2006
20,195	20,241	20,550	20,852	20,899	21,193

In 2006 there were 6,738 criminal offences in the quarter (318 crimes per 1000 people).

== Politics ==
These are the results of Harburg in the Hamburg state election:

Election	SPD	Greens	Left	AfD	CDU	FDP	Others
2020	32,9 %	25,0 %	14,5 %	7,8 %	6,6 %	3,3 %	9,9 %
2015	42,0 %	12,4 %	13,6 %	9,5 %	10,2 %	4,3 %	8,0 %
2011	49,2 %	11,4 %	10,5 %	–	15,2 %	3,3 %	10,4 %
2008	40,0 %	9,0 %	8,9 %	–	33,3 %	3,5 %	5,2 %
2004	34,8 %	10,6 %	–	–	40,4 %	2,2 %	12,0 %
2001	38,3 %	7,8 %	0,6 %	–	19,7 %	3,2 %	30,4 %
1997	40,9 %	12,4 %	0,8 %	–	24,9 %	2,0 %	19,0 %
1993	47,3 %	11,6 %	–	–	20,4 %	2,4 %	18,3 %
1991	57,3 %	5,3 %	0,7 %	–	28,5 %	2,5 %	5,7 %
1987	53,5 %	5,9 %	–	–	35,7 %	3,4 %	1,5 %
1986	50,0 %	8,6 %	–	–	37,0 %	2,8 %	1,6 %
Dec. 1982	60,8 %	5,4 %	–	–	31,8 %	1,2 %	0,8 %
June 1982	51,9 %	6,5 %	–	–	36,3 %	3,1 %	2,2 %
1978	60,0 %	3,9 %	–	–	31,7 %	2,9 %	1,5 %
1974	53,1 %	–	–	–	34,5 %	8,3 %	4,1 %
1970	60,8 %	–	–	–	29,0 %	4,5 %	5,7 %
1966	64,8 %	–	–	–	25,5 %	5,5 %	4,2 %

== Education ==
The quarter has three elementary schools and four secondary schools in the Harburg quarter.

In Harburg center there are the dormitories of the Studierendenwerk Hamburg, namely the dormitories of the Ebelingstraße 1 and 2, Schüttstraße 5 and Møørstraße 7 and 15.

== Infrastructure ==
=== Health systems ===
In 2006, 154 physicians in private practice and 16 pharmacies were counted in the Harburg quarter.

=== Transportation ===
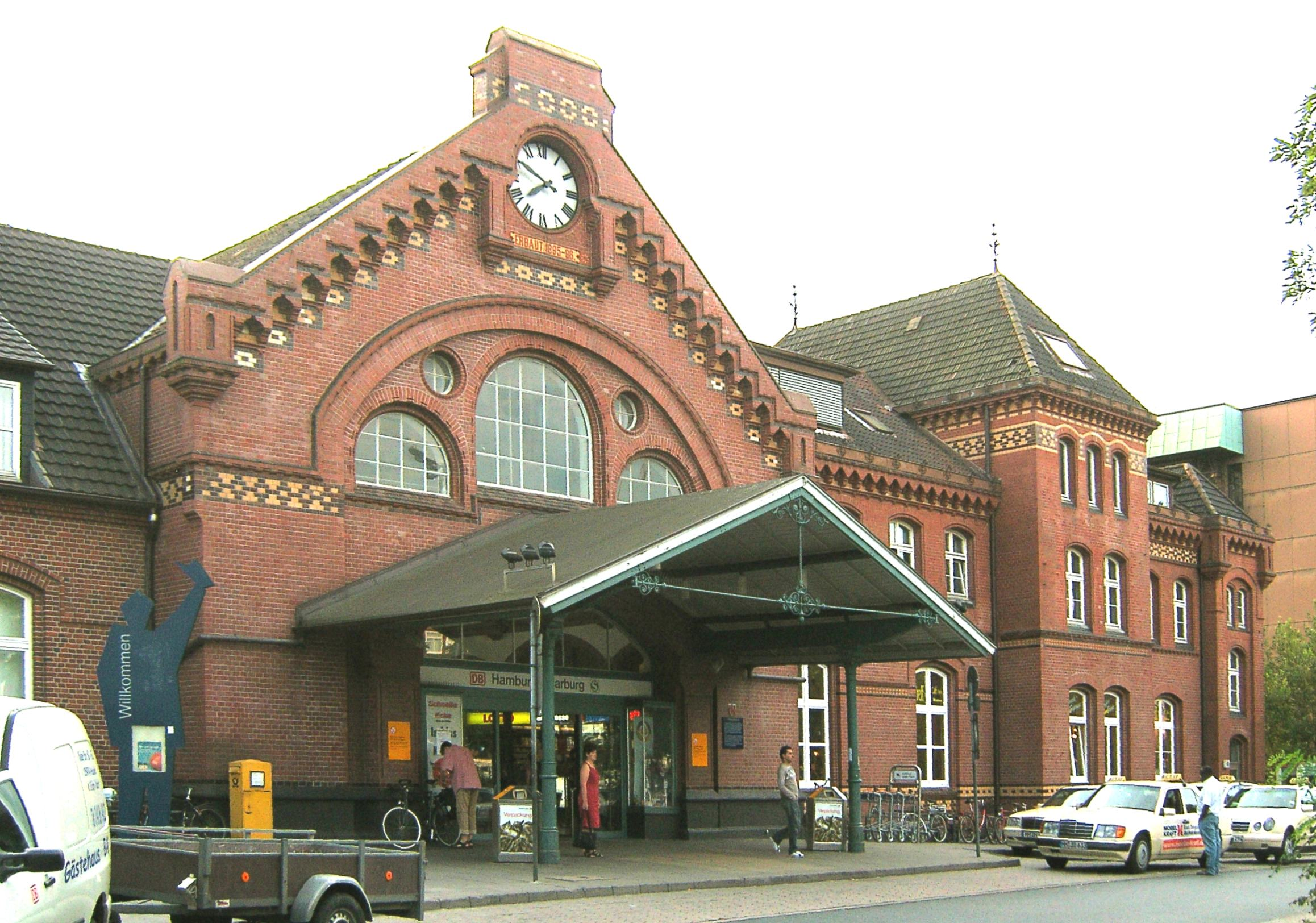
Railway station Hamburg-Harburg

The quarter is serviced by the rapid transit system of the city train with several stations. The Hamburg-Harburg railway station is also a station for long-distance passenger trains for the German railway company.

According to the Department of Motor Vehicles (Kraftfahrt-Bundesamt), 5,148 private cars were registered (246 cars/1000 people) in the quarter.

== See also ==
- Hamburg-Harburg station
- Harburg-Wilhelmsburg
- Technical University of Hamburg
