= List of consorts of Brunswick-Lüneburg =

== Countess of Brunswick ==
Lüneburg became a part of the County after Emperor Lothair, who inherited it from the Billungs.

| Picture | Name | Father | Birth | Marriage | Became Countess | Ceased to be Countess | Death | Spouse |
|---|---|---|---|---|---|---|---|---|
| | Gisela of Swabia | Hermann II, Duke of Swabia (Conradines) | 11 November 995 | 1003/05 | | 1010/11 husband's death | 14 February 1043 | Brun I |
| | Gertrude of Egisheim | Hugo VI, Count of Nordgay (Etichonids) | - | before 1025 | | 23 Apr 1038 husband's death | 21 July 1077 | Liudolf I |
| | Aemilia of Susa | Ulric Manfred II of Turin (Arduinici) | - | 1058 | | 11 January 1068 husband's death | 28 January 1078 | Egbert I |
| | Oda of Weimar | Otto I, Margrave of Meissen | - | before 1080 | | 3 July 1090 husband's death | 1111 | Egbert II |
| | Gertrude of Brunswick | Egbert I, Margrave of Meissen (Brunonen) | 1060 | after 1085 | 3 July 1090 husband's accession | 1101 husband's death | 9 December 1117 | Henry the Fat |
| | Richenza of Northeim | Henry the Fat (Northeim) | 1087/89 | 1100 | 1101 husband's accession | 4 December 1137 husband's death | 10 June 1141 | Lothair of Supplinburgb |
| | Gertrude of Süpplingenburg | Lothair of Supplinburg (Süpplingenburg) | 18 April 1115 | 29 May 1127 | 4 December 1137 husband's accession | 20 October 1139 husband's death | 18 April 1143 | Henry the Proud |
| | Clementia of Zähringen | Conrad, Duke of Zähringen (Zähringen) | - | 1148/49 | | 23 November 1162 divorce | 1148/49 | Henry the Lion |
| | Matilda of England | Henry II of England (Plantagenet) | June 1156 | 1 February 1168 | | 28 June 1189 | | Henry the Lion |
| | Agnes of Hohenstaufen | Conrad, Count Palatine of the Rhine (Hohenstaufen) | 1176 | December 1193/January 1194 | 1203; Division of Duchy | 9/10 May 1204 | | Henry the Tall |
| | Agnes of Wettin | Conrad II, Margrave of Lower Lusatia (Wettin) | - | 1211 | | 28 April 1227 husband's death | 1 January 1248 | Henry the Tall |
| | Beatrice of Hohenstaufen | Philip of Swabia (Hohenstaufen) | April/June 1198 | 23 July 1212 | | 11 August 1212 | | Otto the Proud |
| | Marie of Brabant | Henry I, Duke of Brabant (Leuven) | 1190 | after 19 May 1214 | | 19 May 1218 husband's death | 9 March/14 June 1260 | Otto the Proud |
| | Helena Valdemarsdatter of Denmark | Valdemar I of Denmark (Estridsen) | 1175/82 | Summer of 1202 | 1203; Division of Duchy | 13 December 1213 husband's death | 22 November 1233 | William of Winchester |
| | Matilda of Brandenburg | Albert II, Margrave of Brandenburg (Ascania) | 1210 | end of 1228 | | August 1235; Became Duchess | 10 June 1261 | Otto the Child |

== Duchess of Brunswick-Lüneburg ==
=== Main line ===
| Picture | Name | Father | Birth | Marriage | Became Duchess | Ceased to be Duchess | Death | Spouse |
|---|---|---|---|---|---|---|---|---|
| | Matilda of Brandenburg | Albert II, Margrave of Brandenburg (Ascania) | 1210 | end of 1228 | August 1235; Duchy's creation | 9 June 1252 husband's death | 10 June 1261 | Otto I |
| | Elisabeth of Brabant | Henry II, Duke of Brabant (Leuven) | 1243 | 13 July 1254 | | 17 April/9 October 1261 | | Albert I |
| | Alessia of Montferrat | Boniface II, Marquess of Montferrat (Aleramici) | 1240 | 1 November 1266 | | 1269; Duchy's partitioned, husband received Wolfenbüttel | 6 February 1285 | Albert I |
| | Liutgatd of Holstein | Gerhard I, Count of Holstein-Itzehoe (Schauenburg) | 1251 | 1265, after 15 July | | 1269; Duchy's partitioned, husband received Lüneburg | after 28 February 1289 | John I |
Albert (Wolfenbüttel line) ruled the duchy jointly with his younger brother John (Lüneburg-Celle line). As the brothers could not agree on how to govern the duchy, in 1267 they decided to divide their possession, which happened in 1269. Albert partitioned the territory while John obtained the right to choose his part. He took the northern half including the cities of Lüneburg and Hanover while Albert received the southern part, including Calenberg, Helmstedt, the Harz mountain range and Göttingen. The City of Brunswick was to remain common property of the brothers.

=== Wolfenbüttel line ===
| Picture | Name | Father | Birth | Marriage | Became Duchess | Ceased to be Duchess | Death | Spouse |
|---|---|---|---|---|---|---|---|---|
| | Alessia of Montferrat | Boniface II, Marquess of Montferrat (Aleramici) | 1240 | 1 November 1266 | 1269; Duchy's partitioned, husband received Wolfenbüttel | 15 August 1279 husband's death | 6 February 1285 | Albert I |
| | Agnes of Meissen | Albert II, Margrave of Meissen (Aleramici) | before 1264 | 1282, before 21 July | | 1291; Duchy's partitioned, husband received Grubenhagen | 1 February/September 1332 | Henry I |
| | Rixa of Mecklenburg-Werle | Henry I, Prince of Mecklenburg-Werle (Mecklenburg-Werle) | - | 10 January 1284 | | 1291; Duchy's partitioned, husband received Göttingen | after 2 October 1312 | Albert II (1st reign) |
| | Elisabeth of Hesse | Henry I, Landgrave of Hesse (Hesse) | 1276 | 1290 | | 30 September 1292 husband's death | after 6 July 1306 | William I |
| | Rixa of Mecklenburg-Werle | Henry I, Prince of Mecklenburg-Werle (Mecklenburg-Werle) | - | 10 January 1284 | 30 September 1292 husband's reaccession | after 2 October 1312 | | Albert II (2nd reign) |
| | Agnes of Brandenburg | Hermann, Margrave of Brandenburg (Ascania) | 1296/98 | 16 September/22 December 1319 | | 28 November 1334 | | Otto I |
| | Sophie of Brandenburg | Henry I, Margrave of Brandenburg (Ascania) | 1300 | 1327 | | 1356 | | Magnus I |
| | Elisabeth of Hesse | Henry II, Landgrave of Hesse (Hesse) | 1329 | before 2 March 1340 | | 17 April 1345; Duchy's partitioned, husband received Göttingen | 7 March 1390 | Ernest I |
| | Catherine of Anhalt | Bernhard III, Prince of Anhalt-Bernburg (Ascania) | 1330 | before 6 October 1356 | 15 June/15 August 1369 husband's accession | 26 July 1373 husband's death | 30 January 1390 | Magnus II |
| | Anna of Saxe-Wittenberg | Wenceslas I, Duke of Saxe-Wittenberg (Ascania) | - | 10 November 1386 | | 5 June 1400 husband's death | after 18 April 1426 | Frederick I |
After Frederick I's murder in 1400, Wolfenbüttel was inherited by the two brothers: Bernard I and Henry II, who were joint rulers of Lüneburg. The two brothers agreed in 1409 that they would divide the Duchies with Henry receiving Lüneburg and Bernard receiving Wolfenbüttel.
| | Margaret of Saxe-Wittenberg | Wenceslas I, Duke of Saxe-Wittenberg (Ascania) | - | 12 July 1385 | 5 June 1400 husband's accession | 12 June 1418 | | Bernard I |
| | Sophie of Pomerania | Wartislaw VI, Duke of Pomerania (Griffins) | - | 11 November 1388 | 5 June 1400 husband's accession | 28 June 1406 | | Henry II |
| | Margaret of Hesse | Hermann II, Landgrave of Hesse (Hesse) | 1389 | 30 January 1409 | | 1409 husband relinquish claim Wolfenbüttel for Lüneburg | 1446 | Henry II |
In 1428, a second treaty between Bernard I and his nephews William III and Henry III of Lüneburg. Bernard swapped Wolfenbüttel for Lüneburg.
| | Cecilia of Brandenburg | Frederick I, Elector of Brandenburg (Hohenzollern) | 1405 | 30 May 1423 | 1428 husband relinquish claim Lüneburg for Wolfenbüttel | 1432 husband's deposition in Wolfenbüttel and given Calenberg | 4 January 1449 | William III (1st reign) |
| | Helene de Clèves | Adolph I, Duke of Cleves (De la Marck) | 18 August 1423 | 12 February 1436 | | 3 July 1471 | | Henry III |
| | Elisabeth of Stolberg | Bodo VII, Count of Stolberg-Wernigerode | 1438 | 26 November 1444 | 25 July 1482 husband's accession | 1491 husband relinquish Wolfenbüttel and Calenberg to sons, retaining Göttingen | 7 September 1520 | William IV |
| | Margaret of Rietberg | Conrad V, Count of Rietberg | - | 16 November 1483 | 25 July 1482 husband's accession | 1484 husband's imprisonment | 4 January 1533 or 6 June 1535 | Frederick III |
| | Catherine of Pomerania-Wolgast | Eric II, Duke of Pomerania (Griffins) | - | 1465 | 7 December 1473 husband's accession | 23 June 1514 husband's death | 1526 | Henry IV |
| | Marie of Württemberg | Henry, Count of Württemberg (Württemberg) | 15 August 1496 | 18 February 1515 | | 28 December 1541 | | Henry V |
| | Sophia Jagiellon of Poland | Sigismund I the Old (Jagiellon) | 13 July 1522 | 22–25 February 1556 | | 3 May 1589 husband's death | 28 May 1575 | Henry V |
| | Hedwig of Brandenburg | Joachim II Hector, Elector of Brandenburg (Hohenzollern) | 2 March 1540 | 25 February 1560 | 11 June 1568 husband's accession | 3 May 1589 husband's death | 21 October 1602 | Julius |
| | Elizabeth of Denmark | Frederick II of Denmark (Oldenburg) | 2 March 1540 | 25 February 1560 | 11 June 1568 husband's accession | 3 May 1589 husband's death | 21 October 1602 | Henry Julius |
| | Anna Sophia of Brandenburg | John Sigismund, Elector of Brandenburg (Hohenzollern) | 15 March 1598 | 4 September 1614 | | 11 August 1634 husband's death | 19 December 1659 | Frederick Ulrich |
| | Dorothea of Anhalt-Zerbst | Rudolph, Prince of Anhalt-Zerbst (Ascania) | 25 September 1607 | 26 October 1623 | 11 August 1634 husband's accession | 26 September 1634 | | Augustus II |
| | Elisabeth Sophie of Mecklenburg-Güstrow | John Albert II, Duke of Mecklenburg (Mecklenburg-Güstrow) | 20 August 1613 | 13 July 1635 | | 17 September 1666 husband's death | 2 July 1676 | Augustus II |
| | Christiane Elisabeth von Barby | Albert Frederick, Count of Barby-Muhlingen | 6 October 1634 | 10 November 1650 | 17 September 1666 husband's accession | 2 May 1681 | | Rudolph Augustus |
| | Elisabeth Juliane of Schleswig-Holstein-Sonderborg-Norburg | Frederick, Duke of Schleswig-Holstein-Sonderborg-Norburg (Schleswig-Holstein-Sonderborg-Norburg) | 24 May 1634 | 17 May 1656 | 17 September 1666 husband's accession | 4 February 1704 | | Anthony Ulrich |
| | Christine of Hesse-Eschwege | Frederick, Landgrave of Hesse-Eschwege (Hesse-Eschwege) | 30 October 1648 | 26 November 1667 | | 1667 relinquish claim to Wolfenbüttel for Bevern | 18 March 1702 | Ferdinand Albert I |
| | Elisabeth Sophie Marie of Schleswig-Holstein-Sonderborg-Norburg | Prince Rudolph Frederick Schleswig-Holstein-Sonderborg-Norburg (Schleswig-Holstein-Sonderborg-Norburg) | 12 September 1683 | 12 September 1710 | 27 March 1714 husband's accession | 23 March 1731 husband's death | 3 April 1767 | Augustus William |
| | Christine Louise of Oettingen-Oettingen | Albert Ernest I, Prince of Oettingen-Oettingen (Oettingen-Oettingen) | 20 March 1671 | 12 September 1710 | 23 March 1731 husband's accession | 1 March 1735 husband's death | 3 September 1747 | Louis Rudolph |
| | Antoinette Amalie of Brunswick-Lüneburg | Louis Rudolph, Duke of Brunswick-Lüneburg (Welf) | 22 April 1696 | 15 October 1712 | 1 March 1735 husband's accession | 2 September 1735 husband's death | 6 March 1762 | Ferdinand Albert II |
| | Philippine Charlotte of Prussia | Frederick William I of Prussia (Hohenzollern) | 13 March 1716 | 2 July 1733 | 2 September 1735 husband's accession | 26 March 1780 husband's death | 17 February 1801 | Charles I |
| | Augusta of Great Britain | Frederick, Prince of Wales (Hanover) | 31 August 1737 | 16 January 1764 | 26 March 1780 husband's accession | 16 October 1806 husband's death | 23 March 1813 | Charles II |
| | Marie of Baden | Charles Louis, Hereditary Prince of Baden (Zähringen) | 7 September 1782 | 1 November 1802 | 16 October 1806 husband's accession | 1807; Wolfenbüttel annexed by Napoleon | 29 April 1808 | Frederick William |
Became part of Kingdom of Westphalia (1807–1813); Reformed into the Duchy of Brunswick in 1814.

==== Grubenhagen line ====
| Picture | Name | Father | Birth | Marriage | Became Duchess | Ceased to be Duchess | Death | Spouse |
|---|---|---|---|---|---|---|---|---|
| | Agnes of Meissen | Albert II, Margrave of Meissen (Aleramici) | before 1264 | 1282, before 21 July | 1291; Duchy's partitioned, husband received Grubenhagen | 7 September 1322 husband's death | 1 February/September 1332 | Henry I |
| | Jutta of Brandenburg | Henry I, Margrave of Brandenburg-Stendal (Ascania) | 1299–1306 | before 16 April 1318 | 7 September 1322 husband's accession | 15 July 1325/early February 1327 | | Henry II |
| | Heloise d'Ibelin | Philip d'Ibelin, Seneschal of Jerusalem. (Ascania) | 1307 | 23 August 1330 | | after 25 May 1347 | | Henry II |
| | Adelheid of Everstein | Henry II, Count of Everstein | - | 10 May 1335 or 9 June 1336 | | 9/11 March 1361 husband's death | after 29 September 1373 | Ernest I |
| | Agnes of Brunswick-Lüneburg | Magnus II, Duke of Brunswick-Lüneburg (Ascania) | - | before 17 August 1372 | | 11 August/22 September 1383 husband's death | 21 March 1410 | Albert I (Salzderhelden) |
| | Elisabeth of Brunswick-Göttingen | Otto I, Duke of Brunswick-Göttingen (Guelph) | c. 1390 | 14 July 1405 | | 28 May 1427 husband's death | after 29 September 1444 | Eric I (Salzderhelden) |
| | Adelaide of Anhalt-Köthen | John of Anhalt-Köthen (Ascania) | - | - | 1402 | before 1421 | | Frederick I (Osterode) |
| | Margaret of Sagen | John I of Sagan (Piast) | c. 1415 | 27 June 1457 | | 1464 husband's death | after 9 May 1491 | Henry III (Salzderhelden) |
| | Schonetta of Nassau-Weilburg | John I of Nassau-Weilburg (Nassau) | - | 1414 | | 25 April 1436 | | Otto II (Osterode) |
| | Elisabeth of Waldeck | Wolrad I of Waldeck (Waldeck) | c. 1455 | 15 October 1471 | | 15 August 1485 husband's death | 15 March 1513 | Albert II (Osterode) |
| | Catherine of Mansfeld-Vorderort | Ernest II of Mansfeld-Vorderort (Mansfeld) | 1 October 1501 | 1517 | | 1535 | | Philip I (Salzderhelden) |
| | Margaret of Pomerania-Wolgast | George I of Pomerania (Griffins) | May 1518 | 9 October 1547 | 4 September 1551 | 2 April 1567 husband's death | 24 June 1569 | Ernest III (Salzderhelden) |
| | Dorothea of Saxe-Lauenburg | Francis I of Saxe-Lauenburg (Ascania) | 1 March 1543 | 10 December 1570 | | 5 April 1586 | | Wolfgang (Salzderhelden) |
| | Clara of Brunswick-Wolfenbüttel | Henry II of Brunswick-Wolfenbüttel (Guelph) | 16 November 1532 | 1 July 1560 | 14 May 1595 | 23 November 1595 | | Philip II (Herzberg) |
Annexed by Brunswick-Wolfenbüttel in 1596. Ceded to Brunswick-Lüneburg in 1617.

==== Göttingen line ====
| Picture | Name | Father | Birth | Marriage | Became Duchess | Ceased to be Duchess | Death | Spouse |
|---|---|---|---|---|---|---|---|---|
| | Rixa of Mecklenburg-Werle | Henry I, Prince of Mecklenburg-Werle (Mecklenburg-Werle) | - | 10 January 1284 | 1291; Duchy's partitioned, husband received Göttingen | 30 September 1292 husband's takes over Wolfenbüttel | after 2 October 1312 | Albert II |
Merged into Wolfenbüttel
| | Elisabeth of Hesse | Henry II, Landgrave of Hesse (Hesse) | 1329 | before 2 March 1340 | 17 April 1345; Duchy's partitioned, husband received Göttingen | 24 April 1367 husband's death | 7 March 1390 | Ernest I |
| | Margarete of Jülich | William VII of Jülich, 1st Duke of Berg (Jülich) | c. 1364 | 1379 | | 13 December 1394 husband's death | 18 July 1442 | Otto I |
| | Agnes of Hesse | Hermann II, Landgrave of Hesse (Hesse) | 1391 | c. 1408 | | 1463 husband's death | 1471 | Otto II |
| | Elisabeth of Stolberg | OttoBodo VII, Count of Stolberg-Wernigerode | 1438 | 26 November 1444 | 1491 husband relinquish Wolfenbüttel and Calenberg to sons, retaining Göttingen | 1495 or 7 July 1503 husband death | 7 September 1520 | William IV |
Combined with Calenberg to form Calenberg-Göttingen line

==== Calenberg line ====
| Picture | Name | Father | Birth | Marriage | Became Duchess | Ceased to be Duchess | Death | Spouse |
|---|---|---|---|---|---|---|---|---|
| | Cecilia of Brandenburg | Frederick I, Elector of Brandenburg (Hohenzollern) | 1405 | 30 May 1423 | 1432 husband's desposition in Wolfenbüttel | 4 January 1449 | | William III |
| | Matilda of Holstein-Schauenburg | Otto II, Count of Schauenburg-Pinneberg (Schauenburg) | - | 1466 | | 22 July 1468 | | William III |
Merged into Wolfenbüttel
| | Catherine of Saxony | Albert III, Duke of Saxony (Wettin) | 24 July 1468 | 29 June 1497 | | 1495 or 7 July 1503 husband inherited Göttingen | 10 February 1524 | Eric I |
Combined with Göttingen to form Calenberg-Göttingen line

==== Calenberg-Göttingen line ====
| Picture | Name | Father | Birth | Marriage | Became Duchess | Ceased to be Duchess | Death | Spouse |
|---|---|---|---|---|---|---|---|---|
| | Catherine of Saxony | Albert III, Duke of Saxony (Wettin) | 24 July 1468 | 29 June 1497 | 1495 or 7 July 1503; Union of Calenberg and Göttingen | 10 February 1524 | | Eric I |
| | Elisabeth of Brandenburg | Joachim I Nestor, Elector of Brandenburg (Hohenzollern) | 24 August 1510 | 7 July 1525 | | 30 July 1540 husband's death | 25 May 1558 | Eric I |
| | Sidonie of Saxony | Henry IV, Duke of Saxony (Wettin) | 8 March 1518 | 17 May 1545 | | 1573 divorce | 4 January 1575 | Eric II |
| | Dorothea of Lorraine | Francis I, Duke of Lorraine (Vaudémont) | 24 May 1545 | 19/20 December 1576 | | 17 November 1584 husband's death | 2 June 1621 | Eric II |
| | Hedwig of Brandenburg | Joachim II Hector, Elector of Brandenburg (Hohenzollern) | 2 March 1540 | 25 February 1560 | 17 November 1584 husband's accession | 3 May 1589 husband's death | 21 October 1602 | Julius |
| | Elizabeth of Denmark | Joachim II Hector, Elector of Brandenburg (Hohenzollern) | 2 March 1540 | 25 February 1560 | 11 June 1568 husband's accession | 3 May 1589 husband's death | 21 October 1602 | Henry Julius |
| | Anna Sophia of Brandenburg | John Sigismund, Elector of Brandenburg (Hohenzollern) | 15 March 1598 | 4 September 1614 | | 11 August 1634 husband's death | 19 December 1659 | Frederick Ulrich |
| | Anne Eleonore of Hesse-Darmstadt | Louis V, Landgrave of Hesse-Darmstadt (Hesse-Darmstadt) | 30 July 1601 | 14 December 1617 | 11 August 1634 husband's accession | 23 January 1698 husband's death | 6 May 1659 | George |
| | Sophia Dorothea of Schleswig-Holstein-Sonderburg-Glücksburg | Philip, Duke of Schleswig-Holstein-Sonderburg-Glücksburg (Schleswig-Holstein-Sonderburg-Glücksburg) | 28 September 1636 | 9 October 1653 | | 15 March 1665 husband's death | 6 August 1689 | Christian Louis |
| | Benedicta Henrietta of the Palatinate-Simmern | Edward of the Palatinate-Simmern (Wittelsbach) | 14 March 1652 | 30 November 1668 | | 18 December 1679 husband's death | 12 August 1730 | John Frederick |
| | Sophia of the Palatinate-Simmern | Frederick V, Elector Palatine (Wittelsbach) | 14 October 1630 | 30 September 1658 | 18 December 1679 husband's accession | 23 January 1698 husband's death | 8 June 1714 | Ernest Augustus |
On 7 September 1708, Lüneburg-Celle and Calenberg-Göttingen were combined to form the Electorate of Hanover. See:List of Hanoverian consorts for further consorts.

==== Bevern line ====
| Picture | Name | Father | Birth | Marriage | Became Duchess | Ceased to be Duchess | Death | Spouse |
|---|---|---|---|---|---|---|---|---|
| | Christine of Hesse-Eschwege | Frederick, Landgrave of Hesse-Eschwege (Hesse-Eschwege) | 30 October 1648 | 26 November 1667 | 1667 relinquish claim to Wolfenbüttel for Bevern | 25 April 1687 husband's death | 18 March 1702 | Ferdinand Albert I |
| | Antoinette Amalie of Brunswick-Lüneburg | Louis Rudolph, Duke of Brunswick-Lüneburg (Welf) | 22 April 1696 | 15 October 1712 | | 1 March 1735 became Duchess of Wolfenbüttel | 6 March 1762 | Ferdinand Albert II |
| | Eleonore Charlotte of Courland | Frederick Casimir Kettler (Kettler) | 11 June 1686 | 5 August 1714 | 1 March 1735 husband's accession | 14. April 1746; husband's death | 28 July 1748 | Ernest Ferdinand |
| | Anna Karoline of Nassau-Saarbrücken | William Henry, Prince of Nassau-Saarbrücken (Nassau) | 31 December 1751 | 26 October 1782 | 2 August 1781 husband's accession | 27 April 1809 husband's death | 12 April 1824 | Frederick Charles Ferdinand |
In the 1809, Bevern passed to Frederick William of the Wolfenbüttel line

=== Lüneburg-Celle line ===
| Picture | Name | Father | Birth | Marriage | Became Duchess | Ceased to be Duchess | Death | Spouse |
|---|---|---|---|---|---|---|---|---|
| | Liutgard of Holstein | Gerhard I, Count of Holstein-Itzehoe (Schauenburg) | 1251 | 1265, after 15 July | 1269; Duchy's partitioned, husband received Lüneburg | 13 December 1277 husband's death | after 28 February 1289 | John I |
| | ? of Oldenburg | Otto II of Oldenburg, Count of Delmenhorst (Oldenburg-Delmenhorst) | - | - | 13 December 1277 husband's accession | before 1287 | | Otto II |
| | Matilde of Bavaria | Louis II, Duke of Bavaria (Wittelsbach) | 1275 | 24 April-7 August 1288 | | 28 March 1319 | | Otto II |
| | Matilda of Mecklenburg | Henry II, Lord of Mecklenburg (Mecklenburg) | 1293 | 22 March 1310 | 10 April 1330 husband's accession | 19 August 1352 husband's death | 3 June, after 1358 | Otto III |
| | Hedwig of Ravensberg | Otto IV, Count of Ravensberg | - | before 7 April 1328 | 10 April 1330 husband's accession | 5 December 1336 | | William II |
| | Marie | - | - | after 1336 | | before 2 February 1341 | | William II |
| | Sophia of Anhalt-Bernburg | Bernhard III, Prince of Anhalt-Bernburg (Ascania) | - | 12 March 1346 | | 18 December 1362 | | William II |
| | Agnes of Saxe-Lauenburg | Eric II, Duke of Saxe-Lauenburg (Ascania) | 1353 | 24 June 1363 | | 23 November 1369 husband's death | after 7 January 1387 | William II |
After William II's death in 1369 without a male heir, according to rules of the House of Welf Lüneburg passed to his cousin, Magnus II, in Wolfenbüttel. But Emperor Charles IV considered that the imperial fiefdom (Reichslehen) fell to the Empire and enfeoffed Albert of Saxe-Wittenberg and his uncle Wenceslas with the principality, thus precipitating the Lüneburg War of Succession.
| | Catherine of Anhalt | Bernhard III, Prince of Anhalt-Bernburg (Ascania) | 1330 | before 6 October 1356 | 15 June/15 August 1369 husband's accession | 26 July 1373 husband's death | 30 January 1390 | Magnus II |
| | Catherine of Anhalt | Bernhard III, Prince of Anhalt-Bernburg (Ascania) | 1330 | 11 May 1374 | | 28 July 1385 husband's death | 30 January 1390 | Albert of Saxe-Wittenberg |
| | Cecilia of Carrara | Francis of Carrara, Count of Padua | - | before 11 May 1371 or 23 January 1376 | | 15 May 1388 husband's death | 1427/1435 | Wenceslas of Saxe-Wittenberg |
After Wenceslas's death in 1388, Lüneburg was inherited by the two brothers: Bernard I and Henry II, who would become joint rulers of Wolfenbüttel in 1400. The two brothers agreed in 1409 that they would divide the Duchies with Henry receiving Lüneburg and Bernard receiving Wolfenbüttel.
| | Margaret of Saxe-Wittenberg | Wenceslas I, Duke of Saxe-Wittenberg (Ascania) | - | 12 July 1385 | 15 May 1388 husband's accession | 1409 husband relinquish claim Wolfenbüttel for Wolfenbüttel | 12 June 1418 | Bernard I |
| | Sophie of Pomerania | Wartislaw VI, Duke of Pomerania (Griffins) | - | 11 November 1388 | | 28 June 1406 | | Henry II |
| | Margaret of Hesse | Hermann II, Landgrave of Hesse (Hesse) | 1389 | 30 January 1409 | | 3 December 1416 husband death | 1446 | Henry II |
| | Cecilia of Brandenburg | Frederick I, Elector of Brandenburg (Hohenzollern) | 1405 | 30 May 1423 | | 1428 husband relinquish claim Lüneburg for Wolfenbüttel | 4 January 1449 | William III |
In 1428, a second treaty between Bernard I and his nephews William III and Henry III. Bernard swapped Wolfenbüttel for Lüneburg.
| | Elisabeth of Eberstein | Hermann V, Count of Eberstein | before 1415 | 1425 | 11 June 1434 husband's accession | 27 May/1 June 1445 husband's death | 10 February 1468 | Otto IV |
| | Magdalena of Brandenburg | Frederick I, Elector of Brandenburg (Hohenzollern) | 1412 | 16 September 1430 | 11 June 1434 husband's accession | 27 October 1454 | | Frederick II |
| | Matilda of Holstein-Schauenburg | Otto II, Count of Schauenburg-Pinneberg (Schauenburg) | - | 1463 | | 9 February 1464 husband's death | 22 July 1468 | Bernard II |
| | Anne of Nassau-Siegen | John IV, Count of Nassau-Siegen (Nassau) | 1441 | 25 September 1467 | | 9 January 1471 husband's death | 8 April 1513 | Otto V |
| | Margaret of Saxony | Ernest, Elector of Saxony (Wettin) | 4 August 1469 | 27 February 1487 | | 1520 husband's abdication | 7 December 1528 | Henry I |
After Henry I's abdication, the Duchy passed to his three sons: Otto VI, Ernest I, and Francis I. In 1527, Otto VI married morganically, abdicating in Lüneburg and was compensated with his own domain, the Barony of Harburg. In 1539, the two remaining brothers divided the Duchy. Francis received Gifhorn while Ernest I remain in Lüneburg.
| | Sophie of Mecklenburg | Henry V, Duke of Mecklenburg (Mecklenburg) | 1508 | 1528 | | 17 June 1541 | | Ernest I |
| | Elisabeth Magdalene of Brandenburg | Joachim II Hector, Elector of Brandenburg (Hohenzollern) | 6 November 1537 | 5 February 1559 | | 29 April 1559 husband's death | 1 September 1595 | Francis Otto |
| Translation Needed | Ursula of Saxe-Lauenburg | Francis I, Duke of Saxe-Lauenburg (Ascania) | 1545 | 1569 | | 1569 relinquish Lüneburg for Dannenberg | 22 October 1620 | Henry III |
| | Dorothea of Denmark | Christian III of Denmark (Oldenburg) | 29 June 1546 | 12 October 1561 | | 20 August 1592 husband's death | 6 January 1617 | William VI |
| | Sophia Dorothea of Schleswig-Holstein-Sonderburg-Glücksburg | Philip, Duke of Schleswig-Holstein-Sonderburg-Glücksburg (Schleswig-Holstein-Sonderburg-Glücksburg) | 28 September 1636 | 9 October 1653 | | 15 March 1665 husband's death | 6 August 1689 | Christian Louis |
| | Éléonore Desmier d'Olbreuse | Alexandre Desmier, Seigneur d'Olbreuse | 3 January 1639 | 1676 | | 28 August 1705 husband's death | 5 February 1722 | George William |
On 7 September 1708, Lüneburg-Celle and Calenberg-Göttingen were combined to form the Electorate of Hanover. See:List of Hanoverian consorts for further consorts.

==== Harburg line ====
Harburg was a barony, not a duchy

| Picture | Name | Father | Birth | Marriage | Became Duchess | Ceased to be Duchess | Death | Spouse |
|---|---|---|---|---|---|---|---|---|
| | Agnes of Meissen | Albert II, Margrave of Meissen (Aleramici) | before 1264 | 1282, before 21 July | 1291 husband compensated with Harburg | 7 September 1322 husband's death | 1 February/September 1332 | Otto VI |
| | Matilda of Brandenburg | Albert II, Margrave of Brandenburg (Wettin) | 1210 | 3 November 1849 | | 3 March 1862 | | Paul Frederick |

==== Gifhorn line ====
| Picture | Name | Father | Birth | Marriage | Became Duchess | Ceased to be Duchess | Death | Spouse |
|---|---|---|---|---|---|---|---|---|
| | Clara of Saxe-Lauenburg | Magnus I, Duke of Saxe-Lauenburg (Ascania) | 13 December 1518 | 29 September 1547 | | 23 November 1549 husband's death | 27 March 1576 | Francis I |
In 1549, Francis I died leaving only daughters and therefore Gifhorn reverted to the Lüneburg-Celle line.

==== Dannenberg line ====
| Picture | Name | Father | Birth | Marriage | Became Duchess | Ceased to be Duchess | Death | Spouse |
|---|---|---|---|---|---|---|---|---|
| Translation Needed | Ursula of Saxe-Lauenburg | Francis I, Duke of Saxe-Lauenburg (Ascania) | 1545 | 1569 | 1569; Duchy partitioned, husband received Dannenberg | 19 January 1598 husband's death | 22 October 1620 | Henry III |
| | Maria of Ostfriesland | Edzard II, Count of Ostfriesland (Cirksena) | 1 May 1582 | 25 April 1614 | | 9 July 1616 | | Julius Ernest |
| | Sybille of Brunswick-Lüneburg | William, Duke of Brunswick-Lüneburg (Welf) | 3 June 1584 | 23 November 1617 | | 19 January 1598 husband's death | 5 August 1652 | Julius Ernest |
| | Dorothea of Anhalt-Zerbst | Rudolph, Prince of Anhalt-Zerbst (Ascania) | 25 September 1607 | 26 October 1623 | | 11 August 1634 husband inherits Wolfenbüttel | 26 September 1634 | Augustus II |

== Duchess of Brunswick ==
| Picture | Name | Father | Birth | Marriage | Became Duchess | Ceased to be Duchess | Death | Spouse |
|---|---|---|---|---|---|---|---|---|
Ducal throne was vacant from 1884 to 1913.
| | Victoria Louise of Prussia | Wilhelm II, German Emperor (Hohenzollern) | 13 September 1892 | 24 May 1913 | 1 November 1913 husband's accession | 8 November 1918 husband's abdication | 11 December 1980 | Ernest Augustus |
