= Bernard I of Brunswick =

Duke of Brunswick-Lüneburg from 1400 to 1434

Bernard I, Duke of Brunswick-Lüneburg
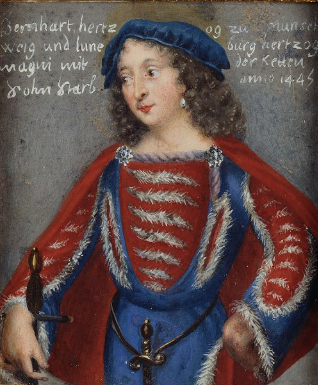
- Born: between 1358 and 1364
- Died: 11 June 1434; Celle
- Noble family: House of Guelph
- Spouse: Margaret of Saxony
- Issue: Otto; Frederick; Catherine
- Father: Magnus II, Duke of Brunswick-Lüneburg
- Mother: Catherine of Anhalt-Bernburg

Bernard (between 1358 and 1364 – 11 June 1434) was Duke of Brunswick-Lüneburg in the early 15th century, co-ruling Brunswick with his younger brother Henry the Mild from 1400 to 1409, then as sole ruler of Brunswick from 1409 to 1428 and of Lüneburg from 1428 until his death in 1434. In the genealogy of the House of Welf, he is considered the first member of the Second House of Lüneburg.

Bernard was the second son of Magnus II, Duke of Brunswick-Luneburg. After the death of his father in 1373, he and his brothers agreed with the Ascanian dukes of Saxony-Wittenberg to alternate rule in the Principality of Lüneburg. From 1375 on, Bernard took part in the government de jure, and from 1385 on de facto.

After his elder brother Frederick was murdered in 1400, Bernard and Henry the Mild began a revenge campaign against the Archbishopric of Mainz and the County of Waldeck, since the archbishop of Mainz was the suspected instigator of the murder plot and the Count of Waldeck performed the deed.

Bernard and Henry ruled the Principality of Brunswick together after Frederick's death; in a treaty of 1409, Bernard received sole rule over Brunswick. After a second treaty in 1428, Bernard switched to the Principality of Lüneburg.

== Family ==
Bernard married Margaret, daughter of Wenceslaus, Elector of Saxony, in 1386. They had three children:

- Otto (died 1446)
- Frederick (died 1478)
- Catherine (died 1429), married Casimir V, Duke of Pomerania

Bernard I of Brunswick House of Welf Cadet branch of the House of Este Born: between 1358–64 Died: 11 June 1434
German nobility
Preceded by Wenceslaus	Duke of Brunswick-Lüneburg; Prince of Lüneburg joint reign with his brother Henry the Mild; 1388–1409	Succeeded by Henry the Mild
Preceded by Frederick	Duke of Brunswick-Lüneburg; Prince of Brunswick-Wolfenbüttel until 1409 joint reign with his brother Henry the Mild; 1400–1428	Succeeded by Henry the Peaceful and William the Victorious
Preceded by Henry the Peaceful and William the Victorious	Duke of Brunswick-Lüneburg; Prince of Lüneburg; 1428–1434	Succeeded by Otto the Lame and Frederick the Pious
