= List of princes of Brunswick-Wolfenbüttel =

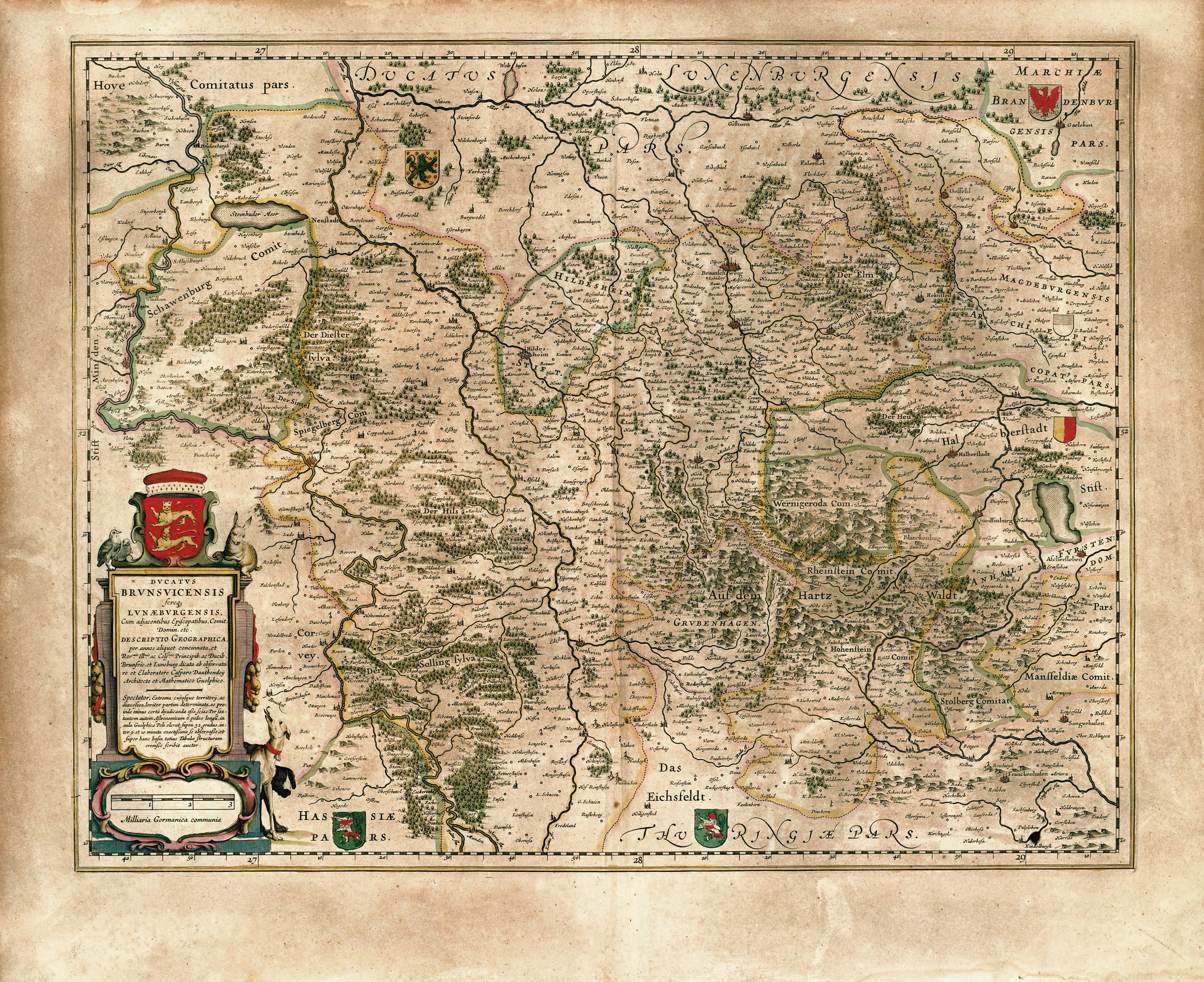
Ducatus Brunsvicensis, 1645

The Principality of Brunswick-Wolfenbüttel was a principality within the Duchy of Brunswick-Lüneburg, whose history was characterised by numerous divisions and reunifications. Various dynastic lines of the House of Welf ruled Brunswick-Wolfenbüttel until the dissolution of the Holy Roman Empire in 1806. As a result of the Vienna Congress, its successor state, the Duchy of Brunswick, was created in 1814. The following is a list of all the reigning princes of Brunswick-Wolfenbüttel. Note that, in addition to being titled "Prince of Brunswick-Wolfenbüttel", all the princes (not just the reigning ones) also used the title of "Duke of Brunswick and Lüneburg".

== Princes of Brunswick-Wolfenbüttel ==
Reign	Name
1267–1279	Albert I (1236–1279) founded the Old House of Brunswick
1279–1291	joint reign of his sons: Henry I the Admirable, Albert II the Fat and William I.
In 1291 there was a further division of the estate as a resolution of the inheritance dispute between the brothers: Henry was given the Principality of Grubenhagen; Albert took over the Principality of Göttingen and William was given the territories around Brunswick-Wolfenbüttel. When William died in 1292, a disagreement broke out over who should inherit. In the end Henry withdrew to Grubenhagen leaving Brunswick-Wolfenbüttel to Albert.

Reign	Name
1291–1292	William I
1292–1318	Albert the Fat (1268–1318)
1318–1344	After the death of Albert his sons Otto the Mild, Ernest and Magnus divided the princedom. After Otto died without issue in 1344, his two brothers Ernest and Magnus divided the estate between them: Ernest received the Land of Oberwald with Göttingen, whilst Magnus the Pious took over the reins of power in Brunswick-Wolfenbüttel.
1344–1369	Magnus the Pious (1304–1369)
1369–1373	Magnus Torquatus (the Lüneburg War of Succession of 1370-88 began under him; it was continued by his sons Frederick and Bernard).
1373–1400	Frederick; following the murder of Frederick near Fritzlar in 1400 there was a period of joint rule by Bernard and Henry
1400–1409	Henry the Mild (d 1416); founded the Middle House of Brunswick, which his nephews, William I and Henry, initially divided.
1400–1428	Bernard, inherited Lüneburg and founded the House of Hanover
1416–1482	William I (d 1482)
1482–1491	William II (d 1503)
1491–1514	Henry the Elder (1463–1514), the Friedfertige
1514–1568	Henry the Younger (1489–1568); - under him the medieval fortress (Burg) was rebuilt into a castle (Schloss); he was a passionate opponent of the Lutherans, and driving force behind the Catholic alliance established against the Schmalkaldic League; the disinheritance of a third son could not be carried out
1568–1589	Julius (1528–1589); - a great builder of the town, who from the fortress created the first systematically laid out Renaissance town; in 1572 he founded the library, whose present name goes back to its most important collect, Duke August the Younger; he also founded the university in Helmstedt in 1576 and built the castle of Hessen; in the early 16th century he reinforced the bastions into a fortress; he purchased Kalenberg, Göttingen and Diepholz; Julius was a Protestant
1589–1613	Henry Julius (1564–1613) - it was the cultural heyday in Wolfenbüttel; Henry Julius was the Bishop of Halberstadt, the rector of the University of Helmstedt, the president of the manorial court, an alchemist, hunter and author
1613–1634	Frederick Ulrich (1591–1634)
The Wolfenbüttel line of the Middle House of Brunswick died out in 1634. The title was transferred to the middle branch of the House of Lüneburg (New House of Brunswick)
1635–1666	Augustus the Younger of Brunswick-Lüneburg (1579–1666) - in 1643 he moved into the Residence at Wolfenbüttel, was the founder of a barock theatre and the Bibliotheca Augusta
1666–1704	Rudolf Augustus (1627–1704) according to reports dating to 1677, he slashed a way through the Lechlum Forest, the Alten Weg ("Old Way"), later the "Barock Road" between the Lustschloss of Antoinettenruh via the little barock castle [later the Sternhaus] to the Großes Weghaus at Stöckheim; in 1671 he captured the town and fortress of Brunswick
1685–1714	Anthony Ulrich (1633–1714) - Anton Ulrich was a politician, art lover and poet; founder of the museum named after him in Brunswick; he had Salzdahlum Castle built
1714–1731	Augustus William (1662–1731)
1731–1735	Louis Rudolph (1671–1735)
The Wolfenbüttel line died out. The title was transferred to the collateral line of Brunswick-Bevern
1735	Ferdinand Albert II (1680–1735)
1735–1780	Charles I (1713–1780) - founder of the Collegium Carolinum in Brunswick, the porcelain makers of Fürstenberg, the fire office; in 1753 the Residence was moved to Brunswick
1780–1806	Charles II William Ferdinand (1735–1806) - he was the head of the Prussian Army; died in the Battle of Jena; because his son and heir died young, and two other sons were not eligible, rule passed to his youngest son:
1806–1807	Frederick William (1771–1815); Duke of Oels/Silesia, the "Black Duke"; recruited a Freikorps (volunteer corps), the Black Brunswickers, at the outbreak of the War of the Fifth Coalition in Bohemia in 1809, and made his way via Brunswick to the North Sea and then on to Great Britain.
1807–1813	occupied by the French (Kingdom of Westphalia)
In 1814 reformed as the: Duchy of Brunswick

== See also ==
- List of consorts of Brunswick-Wolfenbüttel
- List of princes of Lüneburg

== Sources ==
- Wilhelm Havemann: Geschichte der Lande Braunschweig und Lüneburg. 3 Bände. Nachdruck. Hirschheydt, Hanover 1974/75, ISBN 3-7777-0843-7 (Originalausgabe: Verlag der Dietrich'schen Buchhandlung, Göttingen 1853-1857, online near Google Books)
- Hans Patze (Begr.): Geschichte Niedersachsen. 7 Bände. Hahnsche Buchhandlung, Hanover 1977- (Veröffentlichungen der Historischen Kommission für Niedersachsen und Bremen, 36) (Übersicht des Verlags)
- Gudrun Pischke: The Landesteilungen der Welfen im Mittelalter. Lax, Hildesheim 1987, ISBN 3-7848-3654-2
