= Henry IV of Brunswick-Lüneburg =

German noble

Henry IV
- Duke of Brunswick-Lüneburg

Prince of Brunswick-Wolfenbüttel
- Reign: 1491–1514
- Born: 14 June 1463
- Died: 23 June 1514 (aged 51); Leerort, Leer
- Noble family: House of Welf
- Spouse: Catherine of Pomerania
- Issue Detail: Catherine; Henry V Francis
- Father: William IV, Duke of Brunswick-Lüneburg
- Mother: Elizabeth of Stolberg-Wernigerode

Henry IV (14 June 1463 – 23 June 1514), called the Elder (German: Heinrich der Ältere), a member of the House of Welf, was Duke of Brunswick-Lüneburg and ruling Prince of Wolfenbüttel from 1491 until his death.

== Life ==
Henry's father, Duke William IV of Brunswick-Lüneburg retired in 1491, leaving government of the Principality of Brunswick-Wolfenbüttel with Caleneberg to his two sons Henry the Elder and Eric, and only kept the Principality of Göttingen for himself. In 1494, the brothers divided their territories between them: Henry received the eastern part of the state, with the cities of Brunswick and Wolfenbüttel, while Eric took over the Calenberg estates.

Starting in 1492, Henry laid siege to the City of Brunswick for a year and a half to enforce tax payments; the siege ended with a compromise. On 24 November 1498 Henry IV, Magnus and the latter's father John V, Duke of Saxe-Lauenburg allied in order to conquer the Land of Wursten, a de facto autonomous region of free Frisian peasants in a marsh at the Weser estuary, under the loose overlordship of the Prince-Archbishopric of Bremen. Henry obliged to send 3,000 lansquenets to the Land of Hadeln, the Lauenburgian exclave serving as beachhead, with the lansquenets meant to gain their payment by looting and plundering the free peasants of Wursten, once successfully subjected.

On 16 November, Prince-Archbishop Johann Rode of Bremen had prepared for this by concluding a defensive alliance with Hamburg, fearing for its military outpost Ritzebüttel at the Outer Elbe protecting free navigation from and to the city. Rode gained more allies on 1 August 1499 (Bremen city, Buxtehude, Ditmarsh, and Stade), providing 1,300 warriors and equipment to defend Wursten and / or invade Hadeln, and waged a pre-emptive feud on John V and his allies on 9 September 1499. Rode's allied forces easily conquered the Land of Hadeln.

By 20 November 1499 Magnus hired the so-called Great or Black Guard of ruthless and violent Dutch and East Frisian mercenaries, commanded by Thomas Slentz, recapturing Hadeln in early 1500. By early December 1499 Rode had addressed Duke Henry IV for help, who was actually allied with Magnus. In return Rode offered to appoint Henry's 12-year-old son Christopher as his coadjutor, a position usually (as coadiutor cum iure succedendi), and in this case indeed, entailing the succession to the respective see. This exactly accomplished Henry's own expansionist ambitions, so he converted to Rode's column.

Henry IV and his troops were then hunting the Black Guard. Mediated by Eric I, Duke of Brunswick-Lüneburg, Prince of Calenberg and Henry IV, Rode and Magnus concluded peace on 20 January 1500. Hadeln was restored to Magnus, thus no substantial change as compared with the status quo ante.

On 1 February Rode and Bremen's cathedral chapter officially appointed Christopher as coadjutor. Rode and chapter had agreed to pay for Christopher's necessary papal dispensation from the canon-law age limit, as he was too young to be coadjutor, while Henry IV guaranteed military support for the prince-archbishopric. In 1501, Henry attacked Frisian Butjadingen, in order to subject it to the Prince-Archbishopric of Bremen, but he had to abort the campaign. On 7 May 1501 Pope Alexander VI dispensed Christopher from being underage, which cost the Bremian see 1,500 Rhenish guilders. Alexander VI confirmed Christopher as coadjutor under the proviso that he should only ascend to office having come of age (27 years), which was in 1514. However, Christopher de facto assumed the rule in 1511, after Rode's death.

In 1509 Magnus and Henry's daughter Catherine married, which sealed the reconciliation of Henry and Magnus. In 1511, Henry, together with the other members of the House of Brunswick-Lüneburg, conquered the County of Hoya, which had refused to recognize Brunswick-Lüneburg as its liege lord. A second attack on East Frisia in 1514—in the course of the Saxon Feud—led to Henry's death; his head was shot off during the siege of Leerort Castle (today part of Leer).

== Family ==
Henry married Catherine of Pomerania, daughter of Eric II, Duke of Pomerania, in 1486. They had the following children:

- Christoper of Brunswick-Wolfenbüttel, Archbishop of Bremen (c. 1487–1558)
- Catherine of Brunswick-Wolfenbüttel (c. 1488 – 29 June 1563), married Magnus I, Duke of Saxe-Lauenburg in November 1509.
- Henry of Brunswick-Wolfenbüttel (1489–1568), succeeded as Duke of Brunswick-Lüneburg.
- Francis of Brunswick-Wolfenbüttel, Bishop of Minden (c.1492 – 1529)
- George of Brunswick-Wolfenbüttel, Archbishop of Bremen (1494–1566)
- Eric of Brunswick-Wolfenbüttel (c. 1500–1553), joined the Teutonic Order.
- William of Brunswick-Wolfenbüttel (died c. 1557), joined the Teutonic Order.
- Elizabeth of Brunswick-Wolfenbüttel, Abbess of Steterburg
- John of Brunswick-Wolfenbüttel, died as a child.

== Ancestors ==
Ancestors of Henry IV of Brunswick-Lüneburg

8. Henry the Mild, Duke of Brunswick-Lüneburg
4. William the Victorious, Duke of Brunswick-Lüneburg
9. Sophie of Pomarania
2. William IV, Duke of Brunswick-Lüneburg
10. Frederick I, Elector of Brandenburg
5. Cecilia of Brandenburg
11. Elisabeth of Bavaria, Electress of Brandenburg
1. Henry IV, Duke of Brunswick-Lüneburg
12. Henry of Stolberg
6. Bodo VII, Count of Stolberg-Wernigerode
13. Elizabeth of Hohenstein
3. Elizabeth of Stolberg-Wernigerode
14. Henry XXIV, Count of Schwarzburg-Blankenburg
7. Anna of Schwarzburg
15. Duchess Catherine of Brunswick-Giffhorn

== Notes ==
Henry IV of Brunswick-Lüneburg House of Welf Cadet branch of the House of Este Born: 24 June 1463 Died: 23 June 1514
Regnal titles
Preceded by William the Younger	Duke of Brunswick-Lüneburg; Prince of Calenberg jointly with his brother Eric I 1491–1494	Succeeded by Eric I
Preceded by William the Younger	Duke of Brunswick-Lüneburg; Prince of Brunswick-Wolfenbüttel jointly with his brother Eric I 1491–1494	Succeeded by himself, alone
Preceded by himself and Eric I	Duke of Brunswick-Lüneburg; Prince of Brunswick-Wolfenbüttel; 1494–1514	Succeeded by Henry V
