= Frederick III of Brunswick-Lüneburg =

Duke of Brunswick-Göttingen-Calenberg

Frederick III, Duke of Brunswick-Lüneburg, Prince of Göttingen and Calenberg
- Born: 1424
- Died: 5 March 1495; Hann. Münden
- Noble family: House of Guelph
- Spouses: Anna of Brunswick-Grubenhagen-Einbeck; Margaret of Rietberg
- Father: William the Victorious, Duke of Brunswick-Lüneburg
- Mother: Cecilia of Brandenburg

Frederick III "the restless" of Brunswick-Göttingen-Calenberg (born: 1424; died: 5 March 1495 in Hann. Münden), was a son of Duke William the Victorious of Brunswick-Lüneburg and Cecilia of Brandenburg. He became Duke of Brunswick-Lüneburg together with his brother William IV in 1482. However, he was deposed in 1484.

== Life ==
Frederick was often involved in feuds, raids and highway robberies in its first decades of his life; his was later nicknamed the Restless or Turbulentus because of this. In 1477 he was sent to Geldern to attend to administrative matters. Two years later, in 1479, he had to return home; the reason was probably a mental deficiency or mental illness. A little later he had apparently recovered and was again able to conduct administrative business. After the death of his father, William the Elder in 1482, Frederick and his brother William the Younger ruled Brunswick-Lüneburg jointly. Frederick, however, demanded that the territory be divided. William agreed in a treaty dated 1 August 1483 to Mutschierung, that is, sovereignty would still be shared, but the revenues would be divided. Frederick's share included the Principality of Calenberg.

In 1482, the so-called Great Feud of Hildesheim began, between the City of Hildesheim and its bishop, Berthold II of Landsberg. The bishop wanted to introduce a new episcopal tax, which the city refused to agree to. The brothers were on different sides in this feud: William concluded in February 1484 an alliance with the bishop, mediated by his councilor Heinrich von Hardenberg (d. 1492 or 1493), whereas Frederick became Protector of the City of Hildesheim on 7 September 1483. A year later, in September 1484, armed conflict broke out between the parties. William took his brother Frederick prisoner on 10 December 1484 and brought him via Gandersheim and Hardegen to Hann. Münden. Different sources give different reasons for the captivity: some sources — and William himself — mention a new outbreak of mental illness, others point to William's dislike of the division of the country.

The Great Feud of Hildesheim ended in 1486 with an agreement.

A folk song which was discovered in the early 1990s, entitled Duke Frederick, which refers to the circumstances of Frederick's arrest. It consists of eight stanzas and is written in a Low German dialect, apparently at the time of Hildesheim Feud. The song laments the alleged injustice that had befallen Frederick. Some of the conspirators were so opposed to Frederick's stance in the feud that they plotted to overthrow him. To what extent the song has blended historical facts, half-truths and fiction is, of course, impossible to ascertain. However, the literature suggests that considerable truth might be hidden in the text. Among the persons mentioned in the fifth verse are the duke's councilors Otto von der Malsburg (died: probably 1504) and Heinrich von Hardenberg, as well as the Duke's chancellor Johannes Sibolle (attested: 1474–1498), who played an important role on the Brunswick side in the feud. They may have advised the capture of Frederick in order to extend their influence over the three principalities of Brunswick, Göttingen and Calenberg.

Frederick remained in captivity until his death. He died on 5 March 1495 in Hann. Munden, where he lies buried.

== Marriages ==
Frederick was married twice:

- with Anna of Brunswick-Grubenhagen-Einbeck (1415–1474), daughter of the Duke Eric I of Brunswick-Grubenhagen and widow of Albert III of Bavaria
- on 10 May 1483 with Margaret, daughter of Conrad V of Rietberg

Both marriages remained childless.

== Ancestors ==
Ancestors of Frederick III of Brunswick-Lüneburg

8. Magnus II, Duke of Brunswick-Lüneburg
4. Henry the Mild, Duke of Brunswick-Lüneburg
9. Catherine of Anhalt-Bernburg
2. William the Victorious, Duke of Brunswick-Lüneburg
10. Wartislaw VI, Duke of Pomerania
5. Sophie of Pomerania
11. Anne of Mecklenburg-Stargard
1. Frederick III, Duke of Brunswick-Lüneburg
12. Frederick V, Burgrave of Nuremberg
6. Frederick I, Elector of Brandenburg
13. Elisabeth of Meissen
3. Cecilia of Brandenburg
14. Frederick, Duke of Bavaria
7. Elisabeth of Bavaria
15. Maddalena Visconti

== Footnotes ==
Frederick III of Brunswick-Lüneburg House of Guelph Cadet branch of the House of Este Born: 1424 Died: 5 March 1495
Preceded by William III	Duke of Brunswick and Lüneburg; Prince of Göttingen with his brother William IV; 1482–1484	Succeeded by William IV
Preceded by William III	Duke of Brunswick and Lüneburg; Prince of Calenberg with his brother William IV; 1482–1484	Succeeded by William IV
