= Albert I of Brunswick =

Prince of Brunswick-Wolfenbüttel (1236–1279)

Albert I the Tall
- Duke of Brunswick-Lüneburg

Prince of Brunswick-Wolfenbüttel
- Reign: 1269 – 15 August 1279
- Born: 1236
- Died: 15 August 1279 (aged 42–43)
- Burial: Brunswick Cathedral
- Spouse: Elizabeth of Brabant; Adelheid of Montferrat
- Issue: Henry I Albert II; William I Matilda; Luther
- House: House of Welf
- Father: Otto I, Duke of Brunswick-Lüneburg
- Mother: Matilda of Brandenburg

Albert the Tall (Latin: Albertus Longus, German: Albrecht der Große; 1236 – 15 August 1279), a member of the House of Welf, was Duke of Brunswick-Lüneburg from 1252 and the first ruler of the newly created Principality of Brunswick-Wolfenbüttel from 1269 until his death.

== Life ==
Albert was the oldest surviving son of the first Brunswick duke Otto the Child and his wife, Matilda of Brandenburg. When his father died in 1252, he took over the rule of the duchy. In 1267 the duchy was divided between Albert and his younger brother John.

Albert's rule was initially troubled by several armed conflicts as the Welf dukes still had to cope with the followers of the extinct Hohenstaufen dynasty within their dominions. In 1260/61 Albert's troops fought against the Danish duke Eric I of Schleswig on behalf of Queen Margaret Sambiria and her minor son King Eric V of Denmark. In 1263 the duke quite luckless interfered in the War of the Thuringian Succession to support the claims raised by his mother-in-law Sophie of Brabant.

On 31 May 1267, the brothers agreed to divide the Welf lands, which happened in 1269. Albert partitioned the territory while John obtained the right to choose his part. He took the northern half including the region of Lüneburg, Celle and the city of Hanover, while Albert received the southern part around the cities of Brunswick and Wolfenbüttel, stretching from the area around the Calenberg hill to the town of Helmstedt, the Harz mountain range, and Göttingen. The Brunswick residence itself was to remain common property of the brothers.

Albert then concentrated on the development of his hereditary lands. During the Imperial interregnum, he sided with the rising Bohemian king Ottokar II until his final defeat in the 1278 Battle on the Marchfeld. When his brother John died in 1277, he took over the guardianship for his minor nephew Otto II of Brunswick-Lüneburg.

Albert died on 15 August 1279 and is buried at Brunswick Cathedral. He was succeeded by his elder three sons, the younger three joined the Church.

== Marriage and children ==
In 1254, Albert married Elizabeth of Brabant (1243 – October 9, 1261), daughter of Duke Henry II of Brabant and Sophie of Thuringia. They had no children.

After Elizabeth's death in 1261, Albert married Adelheid (Alessia) (1242 – February 6, 1284/85), daughter of Margrave Boniface II of Montferrat around 1263. Once widowed she married Gerhard I, Count of Holstein-Itzehoe. Albert and Adelheid had the following children:

- Henry I, Duke of Brunswick-Grubenhagen (1267–1322)
- Albert II, Duke of Brunswick-Lüneburg (1268–1318)
- William I, Duke of Brunswick-Lüneburg (1270–1292)
- Otto (died ca. 1346)
- Luther von Braunschweig (1275- 1335), Grand Master of the Teutonic Knights from 1331.
- Matilda of Brunswick-Lüneburg, (1276-11 Dec 1310) married the Piast duke Henry III of Głogów.
- Conrad (died ca. 1303)

== Sources ==
- Ancelet-Hustache, Jeanne (1947). Sainte Élisabeth de Hongrie (in French). Éditions franciscaines.
- Carpenter, David (2023). Henry III: Reform, Rebellion, Civil War, Settlement, 1258-1272. Yale University Press.
- Loud, Graham A.; Schenk, Jochen, eds. (2017). The Origins of the German Principalities, 1100-1350: Essays by German Historians. Routledge.
- Allgemeine Deutsche Biographie, vol. 1, p. 257-261
- At the House of Welf site

Albert I of Brunswick House of Welf Cadet branch of the House of Este Born: 1236 Died: 15 August 1279
German nobility
Preceded by Otto I	Duke of Brunswick-Lüneburg jointly with John; 1252–1269	Partitioning among the rulers
Principality of Wolfenbüttel partitioned from the Duchy of Brunswick-Lüneburg	Duke of Brunswick-Lüneburg; Prince of Brunswick-Wolfenbüttel; 1269–1277	Succeeded by Henry I, Albert II, and William I
