= Francis of Brunswick-Wolfenbüttel =

Bishop of Minden

- Bishop of Minden
- Native name: Franz von Braunschweig-Wolfenbüttel
- Church: Catholic Church
- Diocese: Prince-Bishopric of Minden
- Elected: 1508
- Installed: 1508
- Term ended: 25 November 1529
- Predecessor: Thomas of Volden
- Successor: Nikolaus Krage (Reformer, during interregnum)

Personal details
- Born: Francis of Brunswick-Wolfenbüttel; 1492 Brunswick-Wolfenbüttel, Duchy of Brunswick-Wolfenbüttel
- Died: 25 November 1529 (aged 36–37) Wolfenbüttel, Duchy of Brunswick-Wolfenbüttel
- Parents: Henry I, Duke of Brunswick-Wolfenbüttel and Catherine of Pomerania
- Occupation: Cleric

Francis of Brunswick-Wolfenbüttel (1492–1529) (German: Franz von Braunschweig-Wolfenbüttel) was Bishop of Minden as Francis I from 1508 to 1529.

== Life ==
Francis was born in 1492 to Duke Henry I of Brunswick-Wolfenbüttel (1463–1514) and Catharine of Pomerania (1465–1526), daughter of Duke Eric II of Pomerania.

At the age of 16, Francis was elected as Bishop of Minden and subsequently lived in the town from 1511. As a result of his lax morals during his youth, characterized by violence, excessive drinking, debt and fornication as well as quarrels within the House of Brunswick, Francis enjoyed little popularity, a state of affairs worsened by war damage to the town caused by his poor political decisions. In the Hildesheim Diocesan Feud, for example, Francis sided with the rebel knights against the Prince-Bishop of Hildesheim.

During Francis' reign, the Reformation reached the town and Prince-Bishopric of Minden, given impetus thanks to Francis' shortcomings, but it did not fully take hold until after Francis' death in 1529, when Nikolaus Krage was able to preach reform during the interregnum in the bishop's office. Francis died on 25 November 1529 in Wolfenbüttel.

== Literature ==
- Berlinischer Gymnasiallehrer-Verein: Zeitschrift für das Gymnasialwesen: im Auftrage und Mitwirkung des Berlinischen Gymnasiallehrer-Vereins, Vol. 16, Verlag von Theod. Chr. Fr. Enslin, 1862, pp. 580 ff.
- Carl Adolf Cornelius: Geschichte des münsterischen Aufruhrs: in drei Büchern, Vols. 1-2, T. O. Weigel, 1855, pp. 83 ff.

Preceded by Henry III of Schauenburg	Bishop of Minden; 1508–1529	Succeeded by Francis of Waldeck
