= William II of Brunswick-Calenberg-Göttingen =

William IV, Duke of Brunswick-Lüneburg
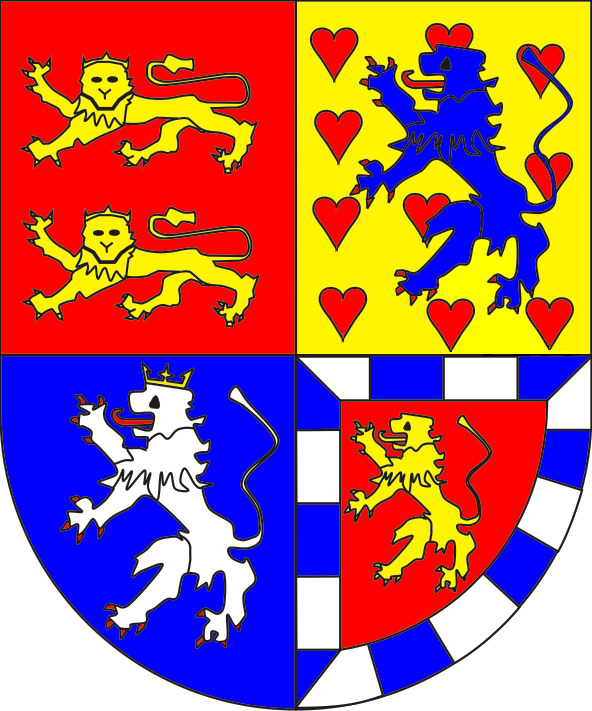
- Coat-of-arms of: Brunswick, Lüneburg, Eberstein, Homburg.
- Born: c. 1425
- Died: 7 July 1503; Hardegsen
- Noble family: House of Guelph
- Spouse: Elizabeth of Stolberg-Wernigerode
- Issue: Anne; Henry IV; Eric I
- Father: William the Victorious, Duke of Brunswick-Lüneburg
- Mother: Cecilia of Brandenburg

William IV (German: Wilhelm) called William the Younger (German: Wilhelm der Jüngere, c. 1425 – 7 July 1503) was duke of Brunswick-Lüneburg and ruled over the Wolfenbüttel and Göttingen principalities.

The eldest son of William the Victorious, Duke of Brunswick-Lüneburg, he was given the Principality of Göttingen by his father in 1473. In 1482, their father died, and he and his brother Frederick succeeded him in the remaining parts of his state; however, William had Frederick imprisoned in 1484 and made himself sole ruler. In 1490, he bought the City of Helmstedt from the Abbot of Werden. In 1491, William gave the Principality of Wolfenbüttel including Calenberg to his sons, and kept only Göttingen to himself. In 1495, he resigned as prince of Göttingen in favour of his son Eric I in return for an appanage. William died on 7 July 1503 in Hardegsen.

== Family ==
William married Elizabeth (c. 1438 – 7 September 1520), daughter of Bodo VII, Count of Stolberg-Wernigerode. They had three children:

- Anne (1460 – 16 May 1520) married William I, Landgrave of Lower Hesse
- Henry (24 June 1463 – 23 June 1514)
- Eric (16 February 1470 – 26 July 1540) married 1: Katharina (1468–1524) Duchess of Saxony; 2: Elisabeth (1510–1558) Duchess of Brandenburg

== Ancestors ==
Ancestors of William II of Brunswick-Calenberg-Göttingen

8. Magnus II, Duke of Brunswick-Lüneburg
4. Henry the Mild, Duke of Brunswick-Lüneburg
9. Catherine of Anhalt-Bernburg
2. William the Victorious, Duke of Brunswick-Lüneburg
10. Wartislaw VI, Duke of Pomerania
5. Sophie of Pomarania
11. Anne of Mecklenburg-Stargard
1. William IV, Duke of Brunswick-Lüneburg
12. Frederick V, Burgrave of Nuremberg
6. Frederick I, Elector of Brandenburg
13. Elisabeth of Meissen
3. Cecilia of Brandenburg
14. Frederick, Duke of Bavaria
7. Elisabeth of Bavaria
15. Maddalena Visconti

William II of Brunswick-Calenberg-Göttingen House of Welf Cadet branch of the House of Este Born: ca. 1425 Died: 7 July 1503
Regnal titles
| Preceded by William the Victorious | Duke of Brunswick-Lüneburg; Princes of Calenberg with his brother Frederick III the Turbulent; 1473–1483 | Succeeded by Frederick III the Turbulent |
| Preceded by William the Victorious | Duke of Brunswick-Lüneburg; Princes of Göttingen with his brother Frederick III the Turbulent; 1473–1483 | Succeeded by Frederick III the Turbulent |
| Preceded by William the Victorious | Duke of Brunswick-Lüneburg; Prince of Brunswick-Wolfenbüttel with his brother Frederick III the Turbulent until 1483; 1482–1491 | Succeeded by Henry the Evil and Eric I |
| Preceded by Frederick III the Turbulent | Duke of Brunswick-Lüneburg; Prince of Calenberg; 1484–1491 | Succeeded by Henry the Evil and Eric I |
| Preceded by Frederick III the Turbulent | Duke of Brunswick-Lüneburg; Princes of Göttingen; 1484–1495 | Succeeded by Eric I |
