= Principality of Göttingen =

Part of the Duchy of Brunswick-Luneburg

Principality of Göttingen Fürstentum Göttingen
- 1286–1495
- Coat of arms

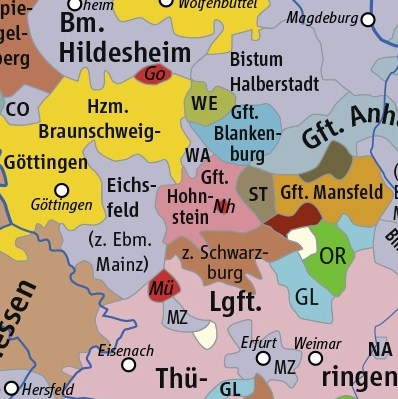
- Principality of Brunswick-Göttingen (yellow), c. 1400
- Status: Principality
- Capital: Göttingen
- Historical era: Middle Ages
  - Albert the Fat first Prince of Göttingen: 1286
  - acquired Brunswick-Wolfenbüttel: 1292
  - again separated from Wolfenbüttel: 1344
  - Line extinct, annexed by Calenberg: 1463
  - Merged into Calenberg: 1495
Preceded by	Succeeded by
Principality of Brunswick-Wolfenbüttel	Principality of Calenberg

The Principality of Göttingen (German: Fürstentum Göttingen) was a subdivision of the Duchy of Brunswick-Lüneburg in the Holy Roman Empire, with Göttingen as its capital. It was split off from the Principality of Brunswick-Wolfenbüttel in 1286 in the course of an estate division among members of the ruling House of Welf. In 1495 the Göttingen lands were incorporated as integral part of the newly established Brunswick Principality of Calenberg, with which they stayed united until the territory was merged into the Electorate of Hanover.

== Geography ==
The principality covered the southern part of the Welf domains in the former Duchy of Saxony after the deposition of Duke Henry the Lion in 1180 (roughly corresponding to present-day South Lower Saxony). When in 1235 Emperor Frederick II had the Welf allodial lands restored as the Duchy of Brunswick-Lüneburg, the ducal estates also comprised the lands on the Weser river, from Lauenförde up to Münden and the border with the Franconian lands of Hesse; as well as the Leine banks from Göttingen up to Northeim and Einbeck. The territory was separated from the northern Welf principalities of Lüneburg and Brunswick-Wolfenbüttel by the estates of the Hildesheim prince-bishops.

== History ==
The Göttingen territory had already belonged to the allodial possessions of the Welf count palatine Henry the Elder in the early 13th century. After the death of the first Brunswick-Lüneburg duke Otto the Child in 1257, his sons Albert the Tall and John inherited their father's territories. Duke Albert initially governed for his brother, who then was still a minor.

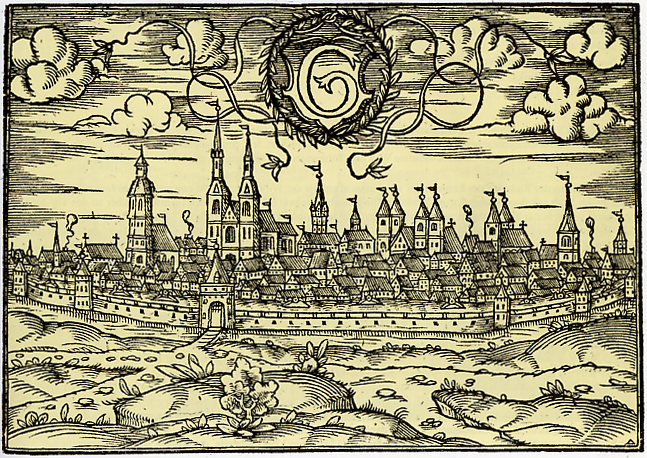
H. Bünting: Göttingen from the west, woodcut, 1585

When John came of age in 1267, the brothers finally agreed to divide the territory between them, the first step of a centuries-long fragmentation of the Brunswick-Lüneburg duchy. Effective from 1269, the territories around the cities of Wolfenbüttel and Göttingen in the south went to Albert, then ruling Prince of Wolfenbüttel. They were inherited by his sons Henry the Admirable, Albert II the Fat and William in 1279. When in 1286 the brothers again divided their heritage, Albert II chose Göttingen as his residence and moved into the Welf residency, which he rebuilt into a fortress. After his brother William had died in 1292, he was also able to acquire the subdivision around Wolfenbüttel against his elder brother Henry, who only retained the Principality of Grubenhagen.

After Albert the Fat's death in 1318, Göttingen passed to his eldest son Otto the Mild, who governed over both the "Principality of Göttingen" and the territory of Brunswick-Wolfenbüttel. These dukes joined Göttingen and surrounding towns in battles against aristocratic knights in the surroundings of Göttingen, in the course of which the citizens of Göttingen succeeded in destroying the fortress of Grone between 1323 and 1329, as well as the fortress of Rosdorf. Since Otto the Mild died in 1344 without leaving children, his younger brothers Magnus the Pious and Ernest divided the land between themselves. Ernest I received Göttingen, the poorest of all the Welf principalities, which was to remain separate from Brunswick-Wolfenbüttel for centuries. At this time, the territory consisted of the regions formerly owned by the Counts of Northeim, the towns of Göttingen, Uslar, Dransfeld, Münden, Gieselwerder at the border with Hesse and half of Moringen. Not much is known about the rule of Duke Ernest I but it is generally assumed that he continued to fight against aristocratic knights.

Ernest I was succeeded after his death in 1367 by his son Otto I of Göttingen (the Evil; German: der Quade) (d 1394), who initially lived in the city's fortress and attempted to make it a permanent Welf residency. The epithet the Evil came from Otto I's incessant feuds. Breaking with the policies of his predecessors, he frequently aligned himself with the aristocratic knights of the neighborhood in battles against the cities, whose growing power disturbed him. Under Otto the Evil Göttingen gained a large degree of independence. After losing control of the provincial court at the Leineberg in to Göttingen in 1375, Otto finally tried to impose his influence on Göttingen in 1387, but with little success. In April 1387 Göttingen's citizens stormed and destroyed the fortress within the city walls. In retaliation, Otto destroyed villages and farms in the town's surroundings. However, Göttingen's citizens gained a victory over the Duke's army in a battle between the villages of Rosdorf and Grone, under their leader Moritz of Uslar, forcing Otto to acknowledge the independence of the town and its surrounding properties. 1387 thus marks an important turning point in the history of the town. Göttingen's relative autonomy was further strengthened under Otto's successor Otto II "the One-eyed" of Göttingen (German: Cocles/der Einäugige), not least because the Welf line of Brunswick-Göttingen died out with Otto II, and the resulting questions surrounding his succession after his abdication in 1435 destabilized the regional aristocracy.

The trend towards ever diminishing Welf influence over the town continued until the end of the 15th century, although the town officially remained a Welf property. Nevertheless, it is counted in some contemporaneous documents among the Imperial Free Cities.

The Göttingen branch of the Welf dynasty became extinct, when Duke Otto II the One-Eyed died without male heirs in 1463. His territories were inherited by his cousin Duke William the Victorious, then Prince of Calenberg. After William had also inherited the Principality of Wolfenbüttel in 1473, he gave Göttingen to his eldest son William IV. When in 1482 William IV succeeded his father as Prince of Wolfenbüttel both territories were once again ruled in personal union, though only for a short time, as in 1491 he ceded Wolfenbüttel to his eldest son Henry IV the Evil and finally incorporated Göttingen as an integral part of the Principality of Calenberg, which he gave to his second son, Duke Eric I "the Elder" in 1495. The town of Göttingen refused to pay homage to Eric I in 1504, and as a result, Eric I had Emperor Maximilian I declare the city outlawed. The subsequent tensions economically weakened Göttingen, leading to the town finally paying its homage to Eric I in 1512. Afterward the relationship between Eric and the town improved, because of Eric's financially dependence on Göttingen.

With the Calenberg principality, Göttingen again came into possession of the Welf dukes of Brunswick-Wolfenbüttel in 1584. Devastated in the Thirty Years' War under the rule of Duke Frederick Ulrich and his brother ("the mad") Christian, it passed to Duke George of the Lüneburg-Celle line in 1634, whose descendants ruled it thenceforth. Under the rule of Duke Ernest Augustus, in 1692, it was named as part of the indivisible territory of the Electoral state of Hanover.

== Princes of Brunswick-Göttingen ==
- Albert the Fat, 1286–1318, also Prince of Brunswick-Wolfenbüttel from 1292
- Otto the Mild, son, 1318–1344
  - Ernest I, brother, 1344–1367
- Otto the Evil, son of Ernest, 1367–1394
- Otto II, son, 1394–1463

Line extinct

- William the Victorious 1463–1473, also Prince of Calenberg, Prince of Wolfenbüttel from 1473
- Frederick III, son, 1473–1484,
  - William IV, brother, 1473–1495

Göttingen merged into Calenberg.
