= Cecilia of Brandenburg =

- Born: c. 1405
- Died: 4 January 1449
- Buried: Brunswick Cathedral
- Noble family: House of Hohenzollern
- Spouse: William III, Duke of Brunswick-Lüneburg
- Issue: Frederick III "the Restless"; William IV "the Younger"
- Father: Frederick I, Elector of Brandenburg
- Mother: Elisabeth of Bavaria-Landshut

Cecilia of Brandenburg (c. 1405 – 4 January 1449) was a princess of Brandenburg by birth and by marriage a Duchess of Brunswick-Wolfenbüttel.

== Life ==
Cecilia was the daughter of Elector Frederick I of Brandenburg (1371–1440) from his marriage to Elizabeth (1383–1442), daughter of Duke Frederick of Bavaria-Landshut. Cecilia's brothers were the reigning Electors of Brandenburg, first Frederick II and later Albrecht III Achilles.

She married on 30 May 1423 in Berlin Duke William III of Brunswick-Lüneburg (1392–1482). The marriage had been arranged by Emperor Sigsmund, like that of her sister Magdalena with Duke Frederick II of Brunswick-Lüneburg. Both couples had been engaged on 3 March 1420.

William and his brother Henry II had promised Cecila as jointure Bodenteich Castle plus an annual pension of 2000 guilders. After an exchange of territories, Cecilia received Wolfenbüttel Castle instead. Bishop Magnus of Saxe-Lauenburg tried to redeem pledges to Duke Henry II, and in particular Wolfenbüttel Castle. To avoid the claims of the bishop, Cecilia handed the castle to her brother-in-law Henry II in 1432. Henry managed to avert the claims of the bishop. However, he then asked Cecilia and her children to leave his castle. Cecilia was quoted as saying: this is not what your brother had in mind, and is behaviour unbecoming a Lord of Brunswick, even if I'd been only the wife of a lowly subject. Humiliated, Cecilia and her children moved to Schöningen Castle. A dispute then erupted between Henry and William. The dispute was settled by dividing the Duchy of Brunswick. Henry received Brunswick-Wolfenbüttel, while William had to make do with the Principality of Calenberg.

Cecilia died on 4 January 1449 and was buried in Brunswick Cathedral

== Issue ==
From her marriage with William, Cecilia had two sons:

- Frederick III "the Restless" (1424–1495), Duke of Brunswick-Calenberg

married firstly in 1463 Princess Anna of Brunswick-Grubenhagen (1415–1474)
married secondly 1483 Margaret Countess of Rietberg (died: 1533 or 1535)

- William IV "the Younger" (1425–1503), Duke of Brunswick-Wolfenbüttel

married in 1444 Countess Elisabeth of Stolberg-Wernigerode (died: 1520 or 1521)

== References and sources ==
- Wilhelm Havemann: Geschichte der Lande Braunschweig und Lüneburg, Dieterich, 1853, pp. 667 ff.
