= Matilda of Brandenburg, Duchess of Brunswick-Lüneburg =

German duchess (c. 1210–1261)

Matilda of Brandenburg
- Duchess of Brunswick-Lüneburg
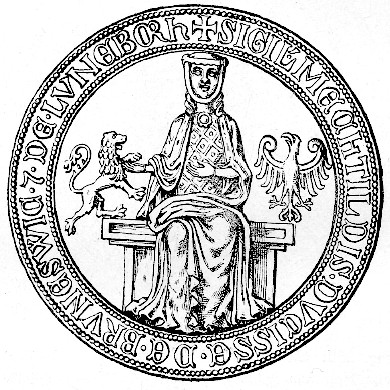
- Seal of Duchess Matilda
- Born: c. 1210
- Died: 10 June 1261 (aged 50–51); Lüneburg, Brunswick-Lüneburg
- Noble family: Ascania
- Spouse: Otto I, Duke of Brunswick-Lüneburg
- Issue: Albert I, Duke of Brunswick-Lüneburg; John I, Duke of Brunswick-Lüneburg; Elisabeth of Brunswick-Lüneburg
- Father: Albert II, Margrave of Brandenburg
- Mother: Matilda of Lusatia

Matilda of Brandenburg (also called Mechthild; c. 1210 – 10 June 1261), a member of the House of Ascania, was first Duchess consort of Brunswick-Lüneburg from 1235 to 1252 by her marriage with the Welf duke Otto the Child.

Matilda was the elder daughter of Margrave Albert II of Brandenburg and his wife Matilda (Mechthild), a daughter of the Wettin margrave Conrad II of Lusatia. Albert's uncle Count Bernhard of Anhalt had received the Duchy of Saxony after the deposition of the Welf duke Henry the Lion in 1180 and Matilda's father, ruling the Margraviate of Brandenburg since 1205, initially had been a loyal supporter of the Imperial Hohenstaufen dynasty. However, upon the assassination of Philip of Swabia in 1208, he switched sides to the Welf rival King Otto IV. Upon his death in 1220, he was succeeded by Matilda's brothers, John and Otto III, who continued to support the Saxon Welfs in the struggle for their allodial lands around Brunswick.

In the course of the reconciliation between the Welf and Ascanian dynasties, Matilda in 1228 was married to the Welf heir Otto I the Child, a nephew of the late Emperor Otto IV and grandson of Henry the Lion. As both were descendants of the Billung duke Magnus of Saxony, a dispensation had been obtained from Pope Honorius III. At the same time, Matilda's younger sister Elisabeth married the Ludovingian landgrave Henry Raspe of Thuringia. The marriage of Matilda and Otto produced ten known children, the basis for a profound marriage policy:

- Elisabeth (1230 – 27 May 1266), married William II of Holland
- Helen (died 1273), married Hermann II, Landgrave of Thuringia and secondly Albert I, Duke of Saxony
- Adelaide (died 1274), married Henry I, Landgrave of Hesse
- Matilda (died around 1295), married Henry II, Prince of Anhalt-Aschersleben, later Abbess of Gernrode
- Agnes, married Vitslav II, Prince of Rügen
- Albert (1236 – 15 August 1279)
- John (c. 1242 – 13 December 1277)
- Otto, Prince-Bishop of Hildesheim (died 1279)
- Conrad, Prince-Bishop of Verden (died 1300).

At the Imperial Diet of 1235 in Mainz, Otto the Child came to terms with the Hohenstaufen emperor Frederick II and was enfeoffed with the newly created Duchy of Brunswick-Lüneburg. He took his residence at Dankwarderode Castle in Brunswick, erected under the rule of his grandfather Henry the Lion. Duke Otto died in 1252 and was succeeded by his eldest son Albert, who nevertheless in 1267 had to divide his Brunswick heritage with his younger brother John.

== Literature ==
- Gudrun Pischke: Mechthild. In: Horst-Rüdiger Jarck (Hrsg.): Braunschweigisches Biographisches Lexikon. 8. bis 18. Jahrhundert, Braunschweig 2006, S. 483
