= William the Victorious, Duke of Brunswick-Lüneburg =

Duke of Brunswick-Lüneburg and Prince of Calenberg (c.1392–1482)

William the Victorious
- Duke of Brunswick-Lüneburg
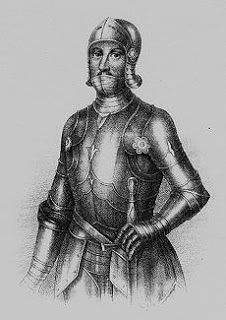
- Born: c. 1392
- Died: 25 July 1482 (Aged 90)
- Buried: Brunswick Cathedral
- Noble family: House of Welf
- Spouses: Cecilia of Brandenburg; Matilda of Holstein-Schauenburg
- Issue: Frederick III the Turbulent; William IV the Younger
- Father: Henry the Mild, Duke of Brunswick-Lüneburg
- Mother: Sophie of Pomerania

William I KG (c. 1392 – 25 July 1482), called the Victorious (German: Wilhelm der Siegreiche), a member of the House of Welf, was Duke of Brunswick-Lüneburg. He was reigning Prince of Lüneburg from 1416 to 1428 and of Brunswick-Wolfenbüttel from 1428 to 1432, counted either as William III or William IV. From 1432, he ruled over the newly established Principality of Calenberg, from 1463 also over the Principality of Göttingen. In 1473, he stepped down in favour of his sons, to assume the rule in Brunswick-Wolfenbüttel.

== Life ==
William was the eldest son of the Brunswick duke Henry the Mild from his first marriage with Sophia, daughter of the Griffin duke Wartislaw IV of Pomerania. Upon his father's death in 1416, he inherited the Brunswick Principality of Lüneburg which he ruled jointly with his younger half-brother Henry the Peaceful. William turned out to be an energetic ruler; he soon entered into numerous feuds with neighbouring princes such as the Archbishop of Bremen and the Bishop of Hildesheim, and supported the Counts of Schauenburg and Holstein in their fight against King Eric of Denmark. He also fought with Margrave Frederick of Meissen defeating the Hussite forces in the 1421 Battle of Brüx.

In 1428, William and Henry swapped Lüneburg with their uncle Duke Bernard I, for the Principality of Brunswick-Wolfenbüttel and the later Calenberg territory stretching from the Deister hill range to the Leine river. However, while again on a campaign in 1432, William was deposed by his brother. After fierce fratricidal warfare, Henry retained Wolfenbüttel while William was compensated with the territory west of the River Leine, separated from the rest of the duchy by the Prince-Bishopric of Hildesheim. These lands were to become known as the Principality of Calenberg (Fürstentum Calenberg), named after William's residence at Calenberg Castle and eventually raised to the Electorate of Hanover centuries later.

When the Brunswick princes of Göttingen became extinct with the death of Duke Otto the One-Eyed in 1463, William was able to take over their principality. After Henry the Peaceful died without sons in 1473, William had control of both parts of Brunswick-Wolfenbüttel again; he then ceded the smaller Calenberg and Göttingen principalities to his sons Frederick III and William the Younger.

== Family ==
In Berlin between 30 May/6 June 1423, William married firstly Cecilia (c. 1405 – 1449), daughter of the Hohenzollern elector Frederick I of Brandenburg. They had two sons:

- Frederick the Turbulent (c. 1424 – 1495), succeeded his father as Duke of Brunswick-Lüneburg and ruling Prince of Wolfenbüttel in 1482, deposed in 1484;
- William the Younger (c. 1425 – 1503), succeeded his father as Duke of Brunswick-Lüneburg in 1482 and ruling Prince of Calenberg and Göttingen in 1482; sole ruler of Wolfenbüttel, Calenberg and Göttingen from 1484; ceded Wolfenbüttel to his son Henry the Younger in 1495.

In 1466, William married secondly Matilda of Holstein-Schauenburg, daughter of Count Otto II of Schauenburg-Pinneberg, and widow of Duke Bernard II of Brunswick-Lüneburg (d. 1464). Matilda died in Neustadt am Rübenberge on 22 July 1468, two days after giving birth a short-lived son, Otto (1468–1471).

== Ancestors ==
Ancestors of William the Victorious, Duke of Brunswick-Lüneburg

8. Magnus the Pious, Duke of Brunswick-Lüneburg
4. Magnus II, Duke of Brunswick-Lüneburg
9. Sophie of Brandenburg-Stendal
2. Henry the Mild, Duke of Brunswick-Lüneburg
10. Bernhard III, Prince of Anhalt-Bernburg
5. Catherine of Anhalt-Bernburg
11. Agnes of Saxony
1. William the Victorious, Duke of Brunswick-Lüneburg
12. Barnim IV, Duke of Pomerania
6. Wartislaw VI, Duke of Pomerania
13. Sophie of Werle
3. Sophie of Pomerania
14. John I, Duke of Mecklenburg-Stargard
7. Anne of Mecklenburg-Stargard
15. Anna of Holstein-Pinneberg and Schauenburg

William the Victorious, Duke of Brunswick-Lüneburg House of Welf Cadet branch of the House of Este Born: about 1392 Died: 25 July 1482
German nobility
Preceded by Henry the Mild	Duke of Brunswick and Lunenburg; Prince of Lunenburg as William II joint reign with his younger half-brother Henry the Peaceful; 1416–1428	Succeeded by Bernard I
Preceded by Bernard I	Duke of Brunswick and Lunenburg; Prince of Wolfenbüttel as William II joint reign with his younger half-brother Henry the Peaceful; 1428–1432	Succeeded by Henry the Peaceful
Calenberg disentangled from Wolfenbüttel	Duke of Brunswick and Lunenburg; Prince of Calenberg; 1432–1473	Succeeded by Frederick III the Turbulent with his brother William the Younger
Preceded by Otto II	Duke of Brunswick and Lunenburg; Prince of Göttingen as William; 1450–1473	Succeeded by Frederick III the Turbulent with his brother William the Younger
Preceded by Henry the Peaceful	Duke of Brunswick and Lunenburg; Prince of Wolfenbüttel as William II; 1473–1482	Succeeded by Frederick III the Turbulent with his brother William the Younger
