= Henry the Peaceful, Duke of Brunswick-Lüneburg =

- Born: 1411
- Died: 7 December 1473
- Noble family: House of Guelph
- Spouse: Helen of Cleves
- Father: Henry the Mild, Duke of Brunswick-Lüneburg
- Mother: Margaret of Hesse

Henry the Peaceful (1411 – 7 December 1473), Duke of Brunswick-Lüneburg, called the Peaceful (Latin: Henricus Pacificus, German: Heinrich der Friedfertige), ruled over both parts of Brunswick-Lüneburg.

== Life ==
Henry was the son of Henry the Mild, Duke of Brunswick-Lüneburg. On their father's death in 1416, Henry and his brother William inherited the Principality of Lüneburg, while under the guardianship of the City Council of Lüneburg (Lunenburg). When the Duchy of Brunswick-Lüneburg was reorganized in 1428, Henry and his brother swapped Lüneburg for the Principality of Brunswick, including Calenberg.

After Henry became of age, he tried to separate his and his brother's government. In 1432, he occupied Wolfenbüttel castle, and the brothers agreed to divide the territory: Henry received Brunswick and William received Calenberg, Everstein, and Homburg.

Henry died without sons in 1473; his territory was inherited by his brother William.

== Family ==
Henry married Helen (1423–1471), daughter of Adolph I, Duke of Cleves, in 1436. They only had one child:

- Margaret, Countess of Henneberg (1450–1509), married William III, Count of Henneberg

== Ancestors ==
Ancestors of Henry the Peaceful, Duke of Brunswick-Lüneburg

8. Magnus the Pious, Duke of Brunswick-Lüneburg
4. Magnus II, Duke of Brunswick-Lüneburg
9. Sophie of Brandenburg-Stendal
2. Henry the Mild, Duke of Brunswick-Lüneburg
10. Bernhard III, Prince of Anhalt-Bernburg
5. Catherine of Anhalt-Bernburg
11. Agnes of Saxony
1. Henry the Peaceful, Duke of Brunswick-Lüneburg
12. Louis the Junker of Hesse
6. Hermann II, Landgrave of Hesse
13. Elizabeth of Sponheim
3. Margaret of Hesse
14. Frederick V, Burgrave of Nuremberg
7. Margaret of Hohenzollern-Nuremberg
15. Elisabeth of Meissen

Henry, Duke of Brunswick and Lunenburg House of Welf Cadet branch of the House of Este Born: 1411 Died: 7 December 1473
Regnal titles
Preceded by Henry the Mild	Duke of Brunswick and Lunenburg; Princes of Lunenburg joint reign with his elder half-brother William the Victorious; 1416–1428	Succeeded by Bernard I
Preceded by Bernard I	Duke of Brunswick and Lunenburg; Princes of Wolfenbüttel until 1432 joint reign with his elder half-brother William the Victorious; 1428–1473	Succeeded by William the Victorious
