= Principality of Calenberg =

Polity in the Holy Roman Empire (1432–1692)

Principality of Calenberg Fürstentum Calenberg (German)
- 1432–1692
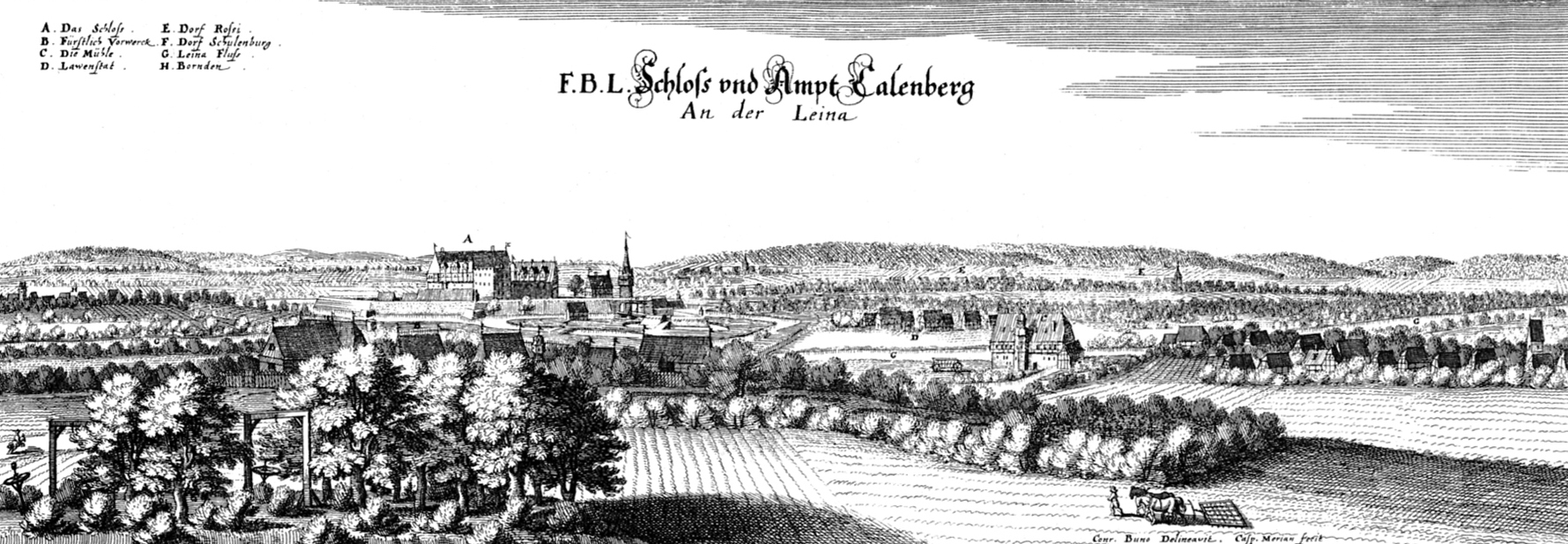
- Schloss und Ampt Calenberg, engraving by Caspar Merian (1654)
- Status: Principality (state of the Holy Roman Empire)
- Capital: Calenberg; Hanover (from 1636)
- Common languages: German; Low Saxon
- Historical era: Middle Ages; Early modern era
  - William the Victorious first Prince of Calenberg: 1432
  - Incorporated Principality of Göttingen: 1495
  - Joined Lower Saxon Circle: 1500
  - Line extinct, fell back to Principality of Brunswick-Wolfenbüttel: 1584
  - Fell to House of Hanover: 1635
  - Raised to Electorate of Brunswick-Lüneburg: 1692
  - Acquired Lüneburg: 1705
Preceded by
Principality of Brunswick-Wolfenbüttel

The Principality of Calenberg was a dynastic division of the Welf Duchy of Brunswick-Lüneburg established in 1432. Calenberg was ruled by the House of Hanover (from the Principality of Lüneburg) from 1635 onwards; the princes received the ninth electoral dignity of the Holy Roman Empire in 1692. Their territory became the nucleus of the Electorate of Hanover, ruled in personal union with the Kingdom of Great Britain from 1714 onwards. The principality received its name from Calenberg Castle, a residence of the Brunswick dukes.

== Territory ==
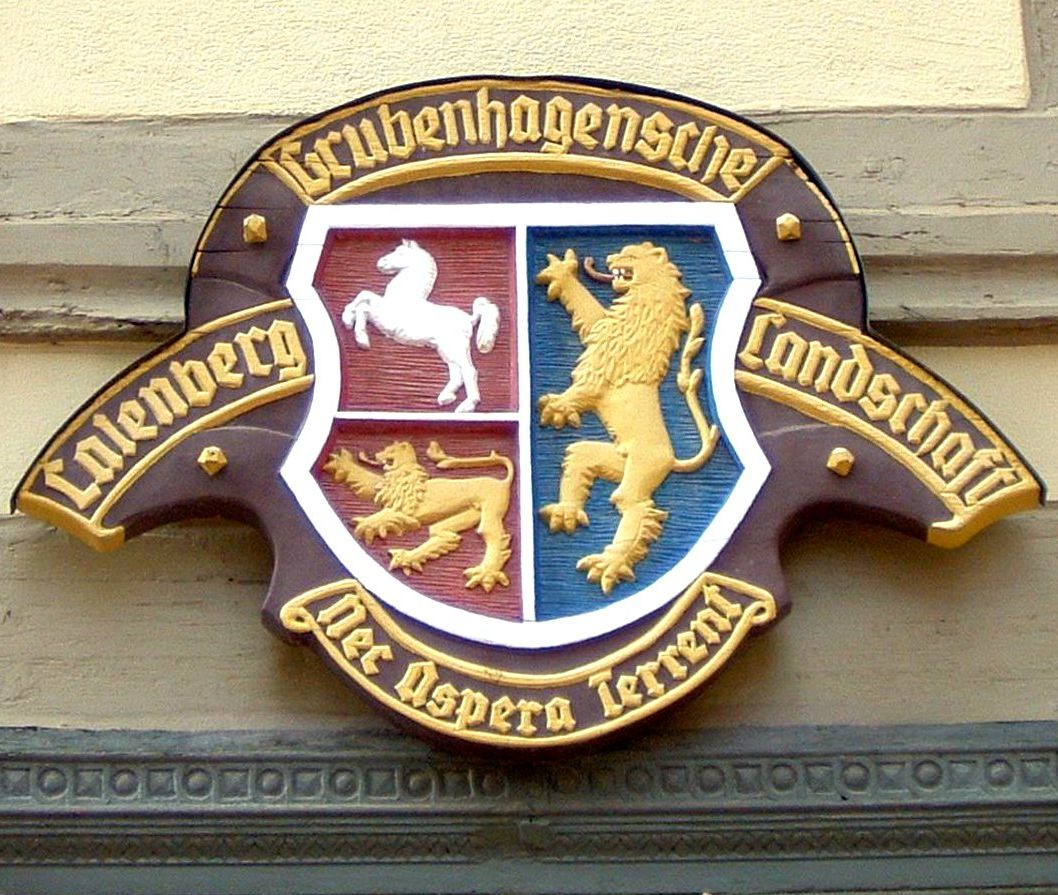
Coat of arms of the Calenberg-Grubenhagensche Landschaft on a building in Göttingen

When Eric I, Duke of Brunswick-Lüneburg chose the Principality of Calenberg as his part of the inheritance in 1495, he described it as "the land between the River Leine and the Deister". This geographical description, however, was never totally correct. In fact, the principality extended west of the Leine from Schulenburg as far as Neustadt am Rübenberge in the north and thus much further north than the foothills of the Deister. To the south-west the territory stretched as far as Hamelin on the Weser, well beyond the Deister.

The city of Hanover was largely independent of Welf territorial lordship, even though it was not formally a free imperial city. Not until George of Calenberg, who had been a successful general in the Thirty Years War, chose the city as his Residenz in 1636 could Hanover also be viewed as part of the Principality of Calenberg. Calenberg Castle was demolished and slighted between 1692 and 1694.

Because of the link that had existed since 1463 between the principalities of Calenberg and Göttingen, the latter was also sometimes referred to as Calenberg. Today the term Calenberg Land is usually only used for the region between Hanover and the Deister.

== History ==
=== Origins and foundation of Calenberg Castle ===
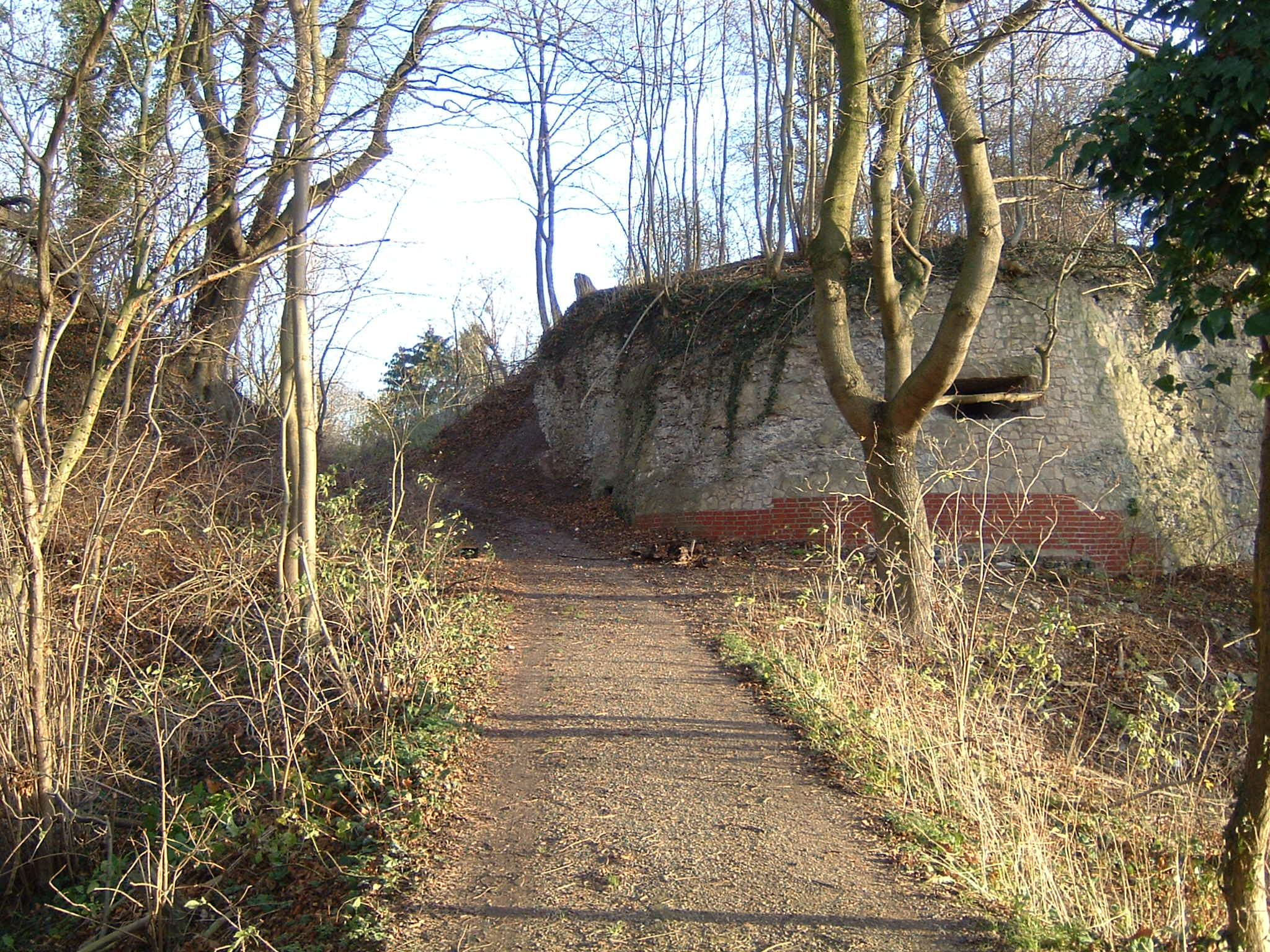
The remains of Calenberg Castle. Here, the battery tower at the main entrance

Originally the territory belonged to the Duchy of Saxony but in 1180, after the imperial ban had been imposed on the Welf prince, Henry the Lion, he lost his ducal lands in Saxony and Bavaria. However, in 1235, Henry's grandson, Otto the Child, was promoted to the rank of prince as a result of the reconciliation between the Houses of Hohenstaufen and Welf and was given the allodial estates of the family claimed by them in the area between Lüneburg and Brunswick as the new and independent Duchy of Brunswick-Lüneburg. In the region west of Hanover, the Welfs had but few allodial possessions and so that area was disputed between the House of Welf and the bishops of Hildesheim and Minden. It was largely ruled by comital dynasties, such as the counts of Wölpe in the northwest, the counts of Hallermund in the southwest and the counts of Rhoden in the west and in Hanover.

In 1292 Duke Otto the Strict from the Lüneburg line of the Welfs subjugated the region. Earlier, he had yielded to the Bishop of Hildesheim and accepted the city of Hanover as his fief. However, he shook off his allegiance and founded Calenberg Castle, just 13 km (8.1 mi) west of Hildesheim, in a countermove in order to further reduce the power of the Bishop of Hildesheim in the Hanover area.

Administratively, this area was initially still called the Vogtei of Lauenrode, after Lauenrode Castle on the outskirts of Hanover, from where, the Welfs ruled the territory. With the extinction of the Lüneburg line of the Welfs, the Lüneburg War of Succession, broke out (1371–88) during which Lauenrode Castle was stormed by the citizens of Hanover and destroyed. The Vogtei was then moved to Calenberg Castle.

=== Welf inheritance divisions ===
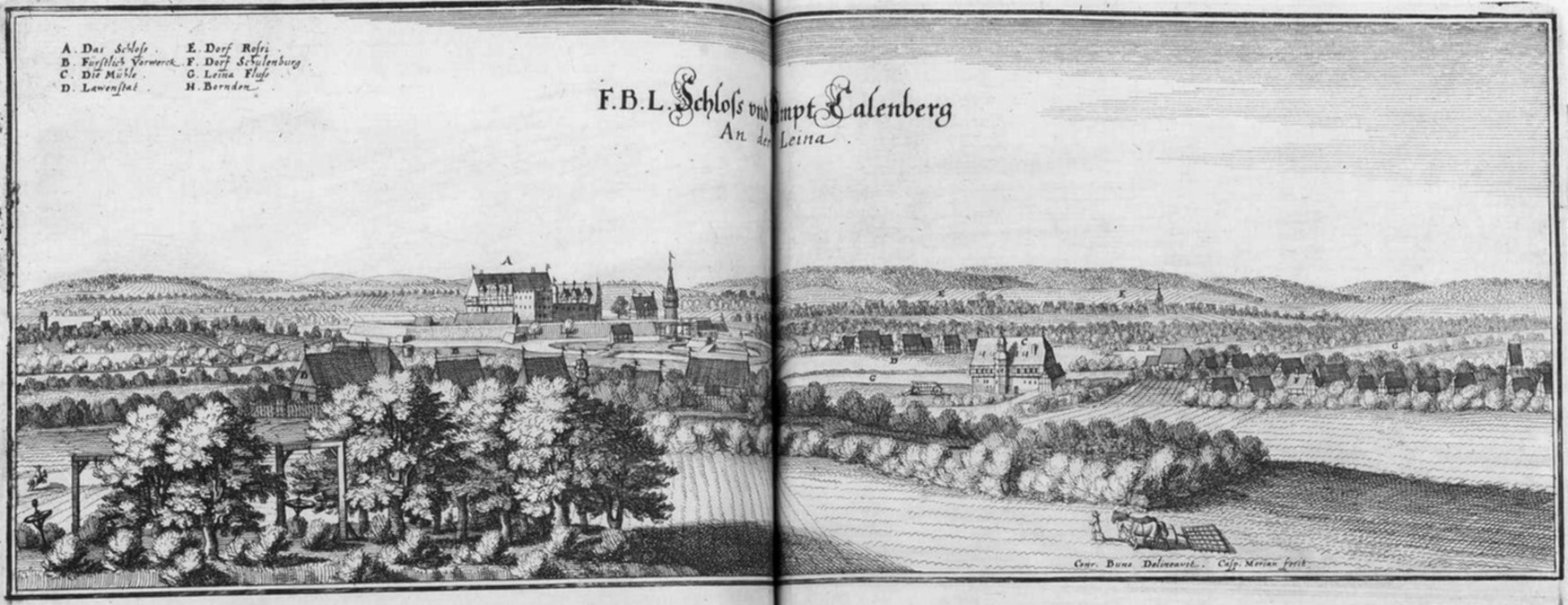
Calenberg Castle in 1654

The Welf dukes did not inherit their land by primogeniture and this resulted in the late Middle Ages in numerous Welf estates and a great fragmentation of Welf territory. In 1400 the Vogtei of Calenberg went to the Wolfenbüttel line of the Welfs. In 1408 and 1409 they were able to purchase the county of Everstein and the lordship of Homburg after the extinction of their reigning families. These were added to the Vogtei of Calenberg. In a further Welf inheritance in 1432 - the ninth according to Gudrun Pischke - the area was divided again by the Welf dukes William the Victorious and Henry the Peaceful who had hitherto ruled jointly in the Principality of Brunswick-Wolfenbüttel. While Henry retained the Wolfenbüttel lands, William was compensated with the newly created Principality of Calenberg. At that time, the lordship given to William had no name. It consisted of the rights formerly owned by the Principality of Lüneburg between the Deister range and the Leine river, as well as the former County of Wölpe, the lordship of Hallermund near Springe and the Homburg and Everstein dominions.

As the Welf princes all carried the ducal title and the territories they ruled were principalities within the Duchy of Brunswick-Lüneburg, their dominions were named after the main castle or town. William spent most of his time at Calenberg Castle from where he administered the territory. As a result, it is probable that the name of the Principality of Calenberg emerged during this time.

=== Unification with Göttingen ===
Between 1442 and 1463 William succeeded in taking over the rule over the Brunswick Principality of Göttingen. Although unification with Calenberg initially came about purely by chance, it lasted nonetheless. In order to distinguish the two areas which were physically separated by the foothills of the uplands in the Leine valley, Calenberg in the north was usually referred to as Unterwald ("Lower Forest"), whilst the Göttingen region was called the Oberwald ("Upper Forest"). When in 1473 William also inherited the Principality of Wolfenbüttel from his brother Henry who had left no heirs, he ceded sovereignty over Calenberg to his sons William the Younger and Frederick III, known as "the Restless" or "Turbulentus".

After the death of William the Victorious in 1482 both sons shared the regency. In an agreement dated 1 August 1483, however, they split the rights of use (Mutschierung). The younger son, Frederick the Restless, was awarded the rights of use over Calenberg and Göttingen, and his brother William the Younger was awarded the rule over Wolfenbüttel. Nevertheless, in 1484/85 William deposed his brother Frederick and declared him insane. The reasons for his removal are debated; perhaps by his participation in many armed conflicts, Frederick was seen to pose a threat to Welf rule in Calenberg and Göttingen. So William succeeded - albeit only briefly - in re-uniting the entire territory of the principalities of Calenberg, Brunswick-Göttingen and Brunswick-Wolfenbüttel. After Frederick's death in 1495, however, William again divided his territories and left the Principality of Brunswick-Wolfenbüttel to his elder son Henry V.

=== Under Eric I, Elisabeth and Eric II ===
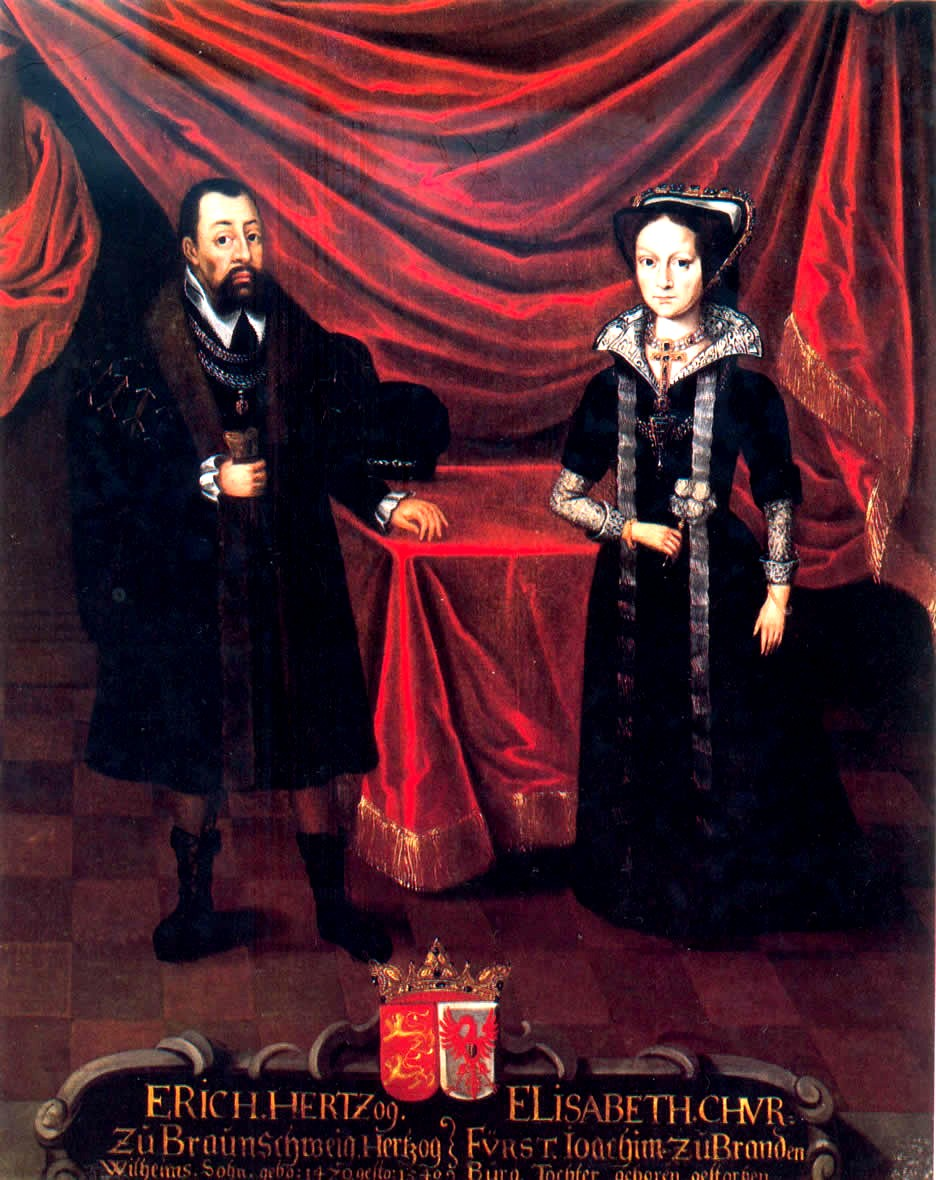
Eric I with his second wife, Elisabeth ca. 1530

The younger son, Eric I received Calenberg and Göttingen and thus founded the Calenberg line of the House of Brunswick-Lüneburg. In the new territory so formed, the name Calenberg was increasingly used for both parts of the state. For the period under Eric I and his son, Eric II, however, the name "Principality of Calenberg-Göttingen" was also used a lot. The principality had separate parliamentary Estates and separate councils for each part. The chancellery for Unterwald was established in Neustadt on Rübenberge and that for Oberwald in Münden. There were also separate residences, lordly castles or manor houses and palaces in each town as well as separate repositories for their records.

Under Eric I, Calenberg Castle was expanded into a strong fortress. Another heavily fortified castle, which he had built, was the Erichsburg near Dassel on which construction began in 1527. In the Hildesheim Diocesan Feud in 1519 he was initially defeated militarily in the Battle of Soltau. Diplomatically, however, he was able to win a ruling from the Emperor Charles V that saw a large part of the Prince-Bishopric of Hildesheim added to his domain.

Eric I was hostile to the emerging Protestant Reformation. His second wife, Elisabeth of Brandenburg, however, whom he married in 1525, switched over to the new doctrine in 1535 and promoted it at the court, which then resided at Münden. After Eric's death in 1540 she took over the government for their underage son, Eric II, and implemented the Reformation in the principality with the state superintendent Antonius Corvinus she had appointed. Eric II, however, converted to Roman Catholicism in 1547 even though he was raised as an Evangelical by his mother. He was not able to reverse the Reformation in the principality however. His power in the principality was already very weak. He spent most of his time as a mercenary leader abroad, and was financially dependent on the towns. In 1553 he had to secure the financial aid of his towns by approving evangelical preaching. From 1574 he had Neustadt am Rübenberge developed as a fortified town and built Landestrost Castle within its walls as a Renaissance chateau, integrated into a bastion fortress based on the Italian model.

In 1582 when the counts of Hoya died out, the larger part of the county went to Calenberg. In 1584 Calenberg also acquired the Diepholz.

=== Thirty Years' War ===
After Eric's death in 1584 Calenberg-Göttingen was again ruled by the Wolfenbüttel line of the Welfs. In the Thirty Years' War the brother of Duke Frederick Ulrich, "mad" Christian, brought the war to the state. After Danish troops under King Christian IV, who was then commander of the Lower Saxon Circle, was defeated by the general of the Catholic League, Tilly in the Battle of Lutter, Tilly occupied the whole principality in 1626. Only the cities of Brunswick and Hanover could not be captured.

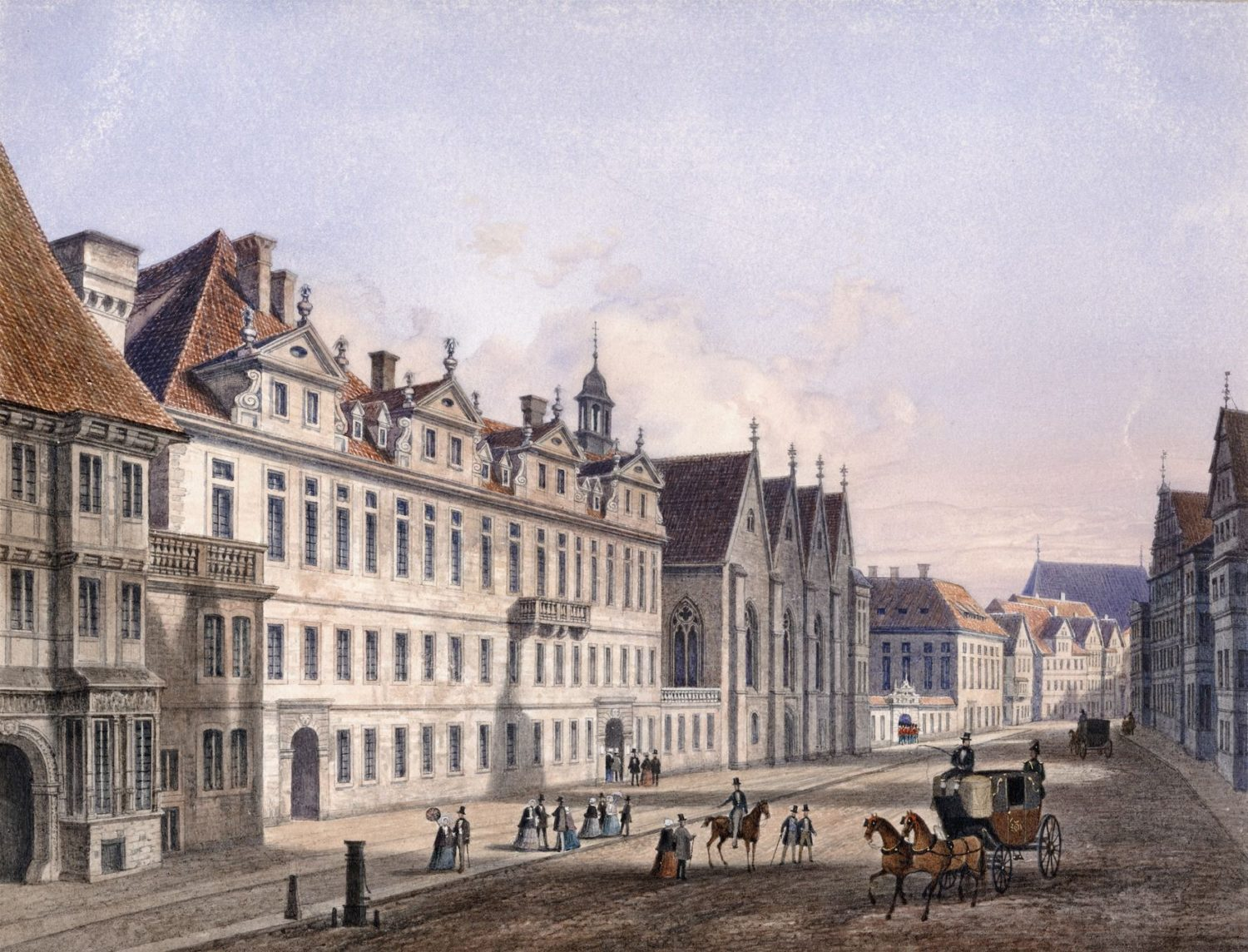
The Leineschloss (former Minorite monastery) in Hanover

When Duke Frederick Ulrich died childless in 1634 the Wolfenbüttel line of the Middle House of Brunswick ended with him. In 1635 Duke Augustus the Elder from the Middle House of Lüneburg received the Principality of Calenberg-Göttingen. After his death in 1636 his younger brother George became its ruler. He was successful as a general on the Swedish side and he also succeeded in 1637 in recovering the country and especially the towns for the Welfs. He initially ruled out of occupied Hildesheim, but then moved his residence to Hanover, which he also had built as a fortress. He had the former Franciscan friary, built around 1300, converted into the Leineschloss, which from then on served as a residence for the sovereigns of the principality. After his death in 1641 a separate peace was hastily concluded with the emperor, which had to be paid for by the return of the land acquired during the Hildesheim Diocesan Feud. George's sons, Christian Louis, George William, John Frederick and Ernest Augustus then ruled the Principality of Calenberg-Göttingen in succession.

=== Elevation to an electorate ===
In 1665 the Principality of Grubenhagen, whose line had died out in 1596 and over which the lines of Lüneburg and Wolfenbüttel had long fought in the Imperial Chamber Court, was also finally added to the Calenberg dynasty. George's youngest son, Ernest Augustus, who ruled from 1679, carried on the successful policies of his father and his brothers. In 1689 the Calenbergs also inherited Saxe-Lauenburg. Ernest Augustus switched to the side of the emperor and introduced primogeniture, contrary to the direction of his father. In 1692 for his services to the emperor, Ernest Augustus was rewarded after a long struggle with the title of the ninth electorate. Officially he was now the Elector of Brunswick-Lüneburg and his government was called the "Electoral Brunswick-Lüneburg Government". In 1705 it was enhanced further by the inheritance of the Principality of Lüneburg, whereby all the estates of the Welfs, apart from the Principality of Brunswick-Wolfenbüttel, became united under the line also known as the House of Hanover from which the British royal throne are descended.

== Economic and social history ==
The Principality of Calenberg was initially a rather insignificant territory and Welf lordship developed here quite late. By the reign of George of Calenberg in 1636, the principality had experienced 140 years of almost continuously poor government that cared little about the state. In the Middle Ages and the Renaissance the cultural centres lay outside Calenberg in the towns of Brunswick, Hildesheim and Lüneburg. New centres were created at the residences of Wolfenbüttel and Celle. Even the city of Hanover was not governed by the Calenberg princes until 1636. The other towns remained unimportant.

Only after the reign of George of Calenberg and its subsequent elevation to the electorate did the former Principality of Calenberg become the nucleus of what later became the German state of Lower Saxony.

== Sources ==
- Güßfeld, Ludwig; Erben, Homann (1786/2002). Die Fürstenthümer Grubenhagen, Calenberg, Wolfenbüttel und Blankenburg 1786. Verlag Rockstuhl, Bad Langensalza, Reprint 1786/2002, ISBN 3-936030-51-0 (Historic map)
- Historisches Museum Hannover (1979). Calenberg – Von der Burg zum Fürstentum. Hanover
- Hauptmeyer, Carl-Hans (1983) Calenberg – Geschichte und Gesellschaft einer Landschaft. Hanover
- Havemann, Wilhelm (1974/75). Geschichte der Lande Braunschweig und Lüneburg. 3 volumes. Reprint. Hirschheydt, Hanover 1974/75, ISBN 3-7777-0843-7 (Original edition: Verlag der Dietrich'schen Buchhandlung, Göttingen 1853–1857)
- Kalthof, Edgar (1982). Geschichte des südniedersächsischen Fürstentums Göttingen und des Landes Calenberg im Fürstentum Calenberg 1285–1584, Verlag Otto Zander, Herzberg (Harz)-Pöhlde, ISBN 3-923336-03-9
- Patze, Hans (Begr.) (1977). Geschichte Niedersachsen. 7 volumes. Hahnsche Buchhandlung, Hanover (Veröffentlichungen der Historischen Kommission für Niedersachsen und Bremen, 36) (Overview by the publishers)
- Pischke, Gudrun (1987). Die Landesteilungen der Welfen im Mittelalter. Lax, Hildesheim, ISBN 3-7848-3654-2
