= Principality of Brunswick-Wolfenbüttel =

1269–1815 German principality

Principality of Brunswick-Wolfenbüttel Fürstentum Braunschweig-Wolfenbüttel (German)
- 1269–1807
- Coat of arms

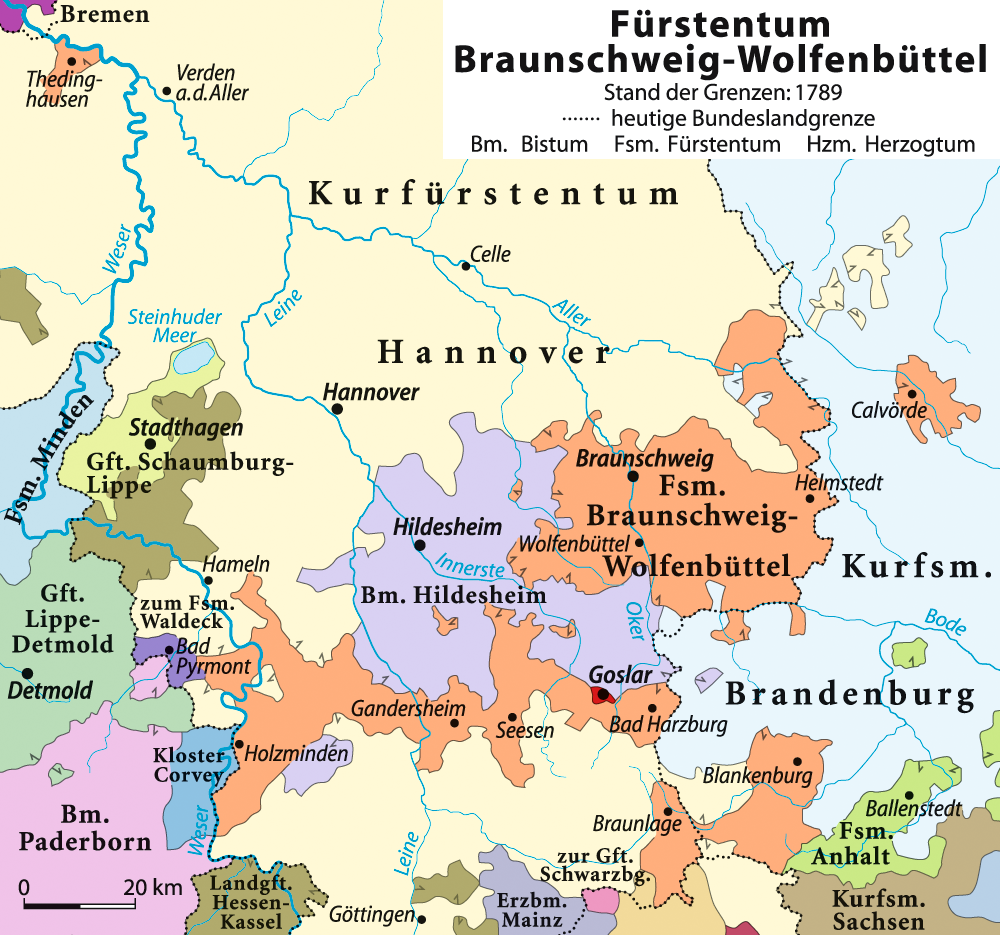
- The Principality of Brunswick-Wolfenbüttel in 1789
- Status: State of the Holy Roman Empire (until 1806)
- Capital: Brunswick (1235–1432, 1753–1815); Wolfenbüttel (1432–1753)
- Common languages: Low German, German
- Religion: Roman Catholic
- Government: Principality
- Historical era: Middle Ages; Early modern era
  - Partitioned from Brunswick-Lüneburg: 1269
  - Acquired by Göttingen; Grubenhagen split off: 1292
  - Re-partitioned from Göttingen: 1344
  - Calenberg split off: 1432
  - Union with Calenberg and Göttingen: 1484–95
  - Joined Saxon Circle (Lower Saxon Circle from 1512): 1500
  - Regained Calenberg and Göttingen: 1584
  - Occupied Grubenhagen: 1596–1617
  - Wolfenbüttel line extinct; Calenberg and Göttingen to House of Hanover: 1635
  - Brunswick-Wolfenbüttel-Bevern split off: 1667–1735
  - Annexed to the Kingdom of Westphalia (Napoleonic Wars): 1807
  - Formally re-established as the Duchy of Brunswick: 1815
Preceded by	Succeeded by
Duchy of Brunswick-Lüneburg	1807: Kingdom of Westphalia; 1815: Duchy of Brunswick

The Principality of Brunswick-Wolfenbüttel (German: Fürstentum Braunschweig-Wolfenbüttel) was a subdivision of the Duchy of Brunswick-Lüneburg, whose history was characterised by numerous divisions and reunifications. It had an area of 3,828 square kilometres in the mid 17th century. Various dynastic lines of the House of Welf ruled Brunswick-Wolfenbüttel until the dissolution of the Holy Roman Empire in 1806. As a result of the Congress of Vienna, its successor state, the Duchy of Brunswick, was created in 1815.

== History ==
=== Middle Ages ===
After Otto the Child, grandchild of Henry the Lion, had been given the former allodial seat of his family (located in the area of present-day eastern Lower Saxony and northern Saxony-Anhalt) by Emperor Frederick II on 21 August 1235 as an imperial enfeoffment under the name of the Duchy of Brunswick-Lüneburg, the duchy was divided in 1267–1269 by his sons.

Albert I (also called Albert the Tall) (1236–1279) was given the regions around Brunswick-Wolfenbüttel, Einbeck-Grubenhagen and Göttingen-Oberwald. He thus founded the Old House of Brunswick and laid the basis for what became, later, the Principality of Brunswick-Wolfenbüttel. His brother John (1242–1277) inherited the land around Lüneburg and founded the Old House of Lüneburg. The town of Brunswick remained under joint rule.

The area of Brunswick(-Wolfenbüttel) was further subdivided in the succeeding decades. For example, the lines of Grubenhagen and Göttingen were split for a while. In a similar way, in 1432 the estates between the Deister hills and the Leine river, that had been gained in the meantime from the Middle House of Brunswick, split away to form the Principality of Calenberg. There were further reunifications and divisions.

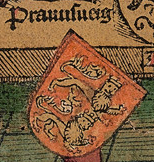
Coat of arms of the Duchy in Schedel's World Chronicle of 1493

In the meanwhile the dukes became weary of the constant disputes with the citizens of the town of Brunswick and, in 1432, moved their Residenz to the water castle of Wolfenbüttel, which lay in a marshy depression of the river Oker about 12 kilometres (7.5 mi) south of Brunswick. The castle built here for the Brunswick-Lüneburg dukes—together with the ducal chancery, the consistory, the courts and the archives—became the nerve centre of a giant region, from which the Wolfenbüttel-Brunswick part of the overall duchy was ruled. For a long time, it also governed the principalities of Calenberg-Göttingen and Grubenhagen, the Prince-Bishopric of Halberstadt, large parts of the Prince-Bishopric of Hildesheim, the counties of Hohnstein and Regenstein, the baronies of Klettenberg and Lohra and parts of Hoya on the Lower Weser. The importance of this court was signified by the number of craftsmen needed. Hundreds of timber-framed buildings were built for the court, for its citizens and for ducal facilities, initially randomly, later designed to ducal requirements and for fire protection. In the heyday of the town's development its districts were named after various dukes: the Auguststadt in the west, the Juliusstadt in the east and the Heinrichstadt.

Following the twelfth division of the duchy in 1495, whereby the Principality of Brunswick-Calenberg-Göttingen was re-divided into its component territories, Duke Henry the Elder was given the land of Brunswick, to which the name of the new Residenz at Wolfenbüttel was added. From then on the name of the principality became "Brunswick-Wolfenbüttel".

=== Early modern times ===
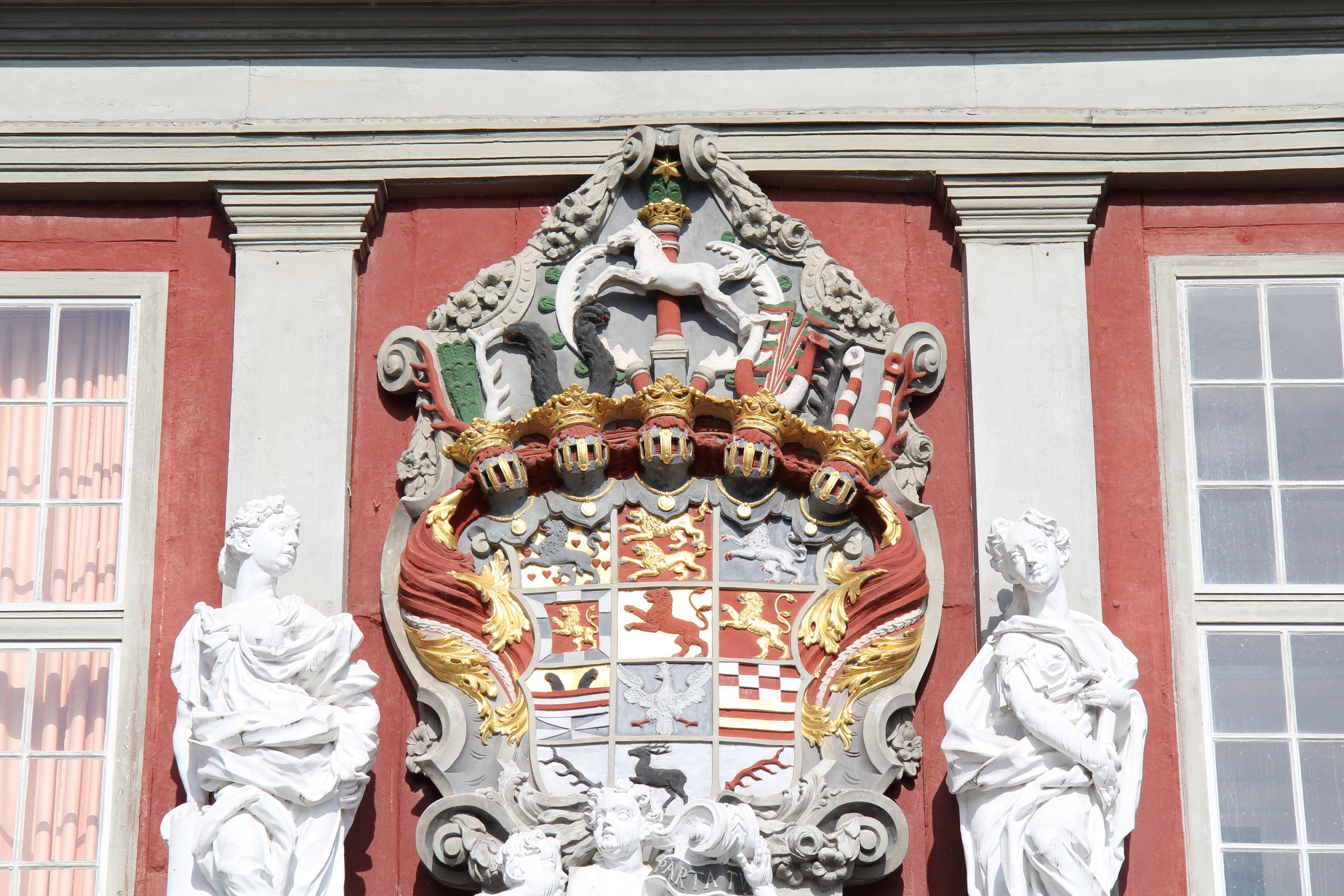
Coat of arms of the principality in early modern times (at Wolfenbüttel Palace)

The reigns of dukes Henry the Younger, Julius and Henry Julius followed, under whose lordship the Residenz of Wolfenbüttel was expanded and the principality gained a Germany-wide standing.

In 1500 Brunswick-Wolfenbüttel became part of the Lower Saxon Circle within the Holy Roman Empire.

From 1519 to 1523 the principality went to war with the principalities of Hildesheim and Lüneburg in the Hildesheim Diocesan Feud which, despite a resounding defeat in the Battle of Soltau, eventually resulted in large territorial gains accruing to Brunswick-Wolfenbüttel.

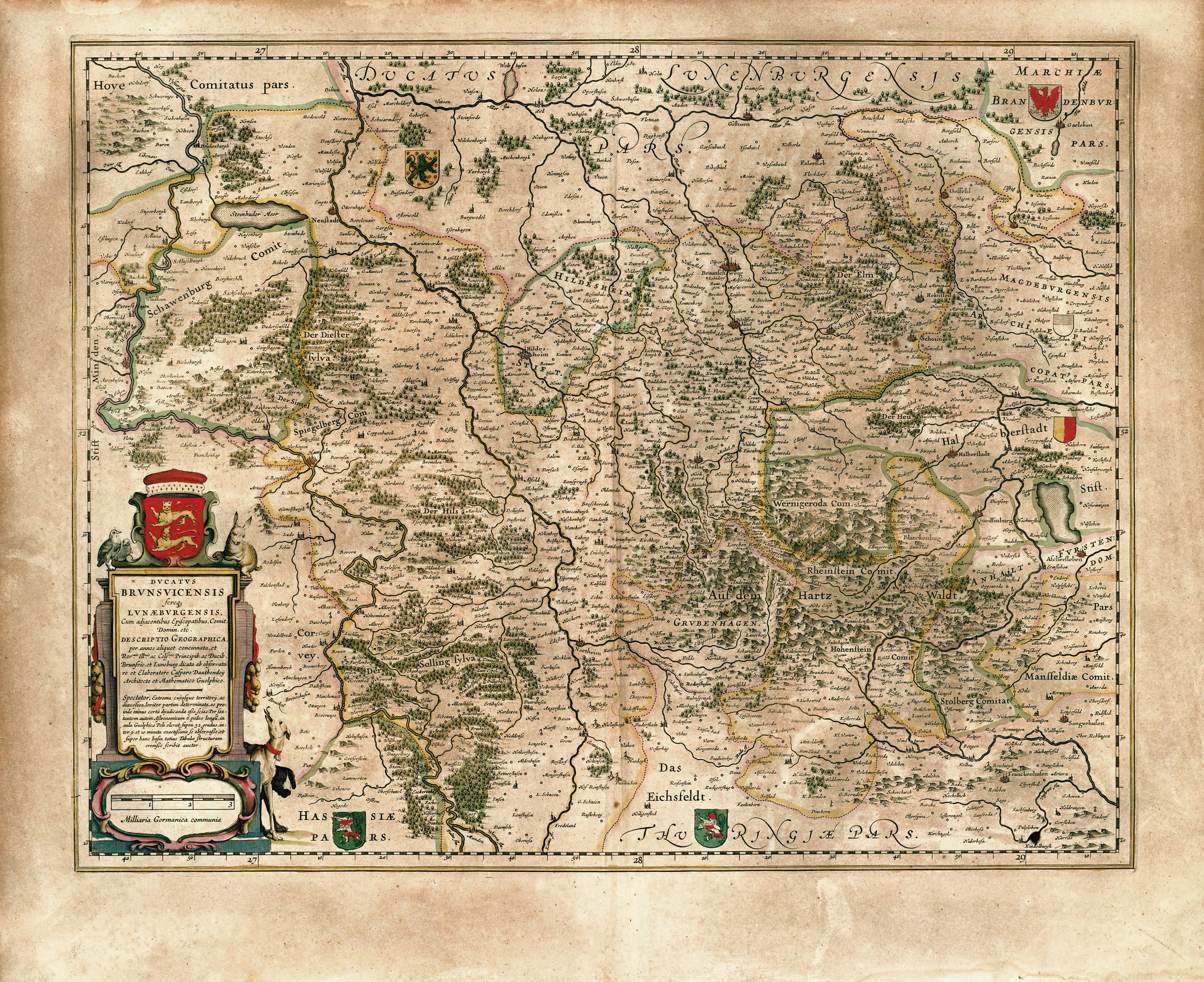
Ducatus Brunsvicensis, 1645

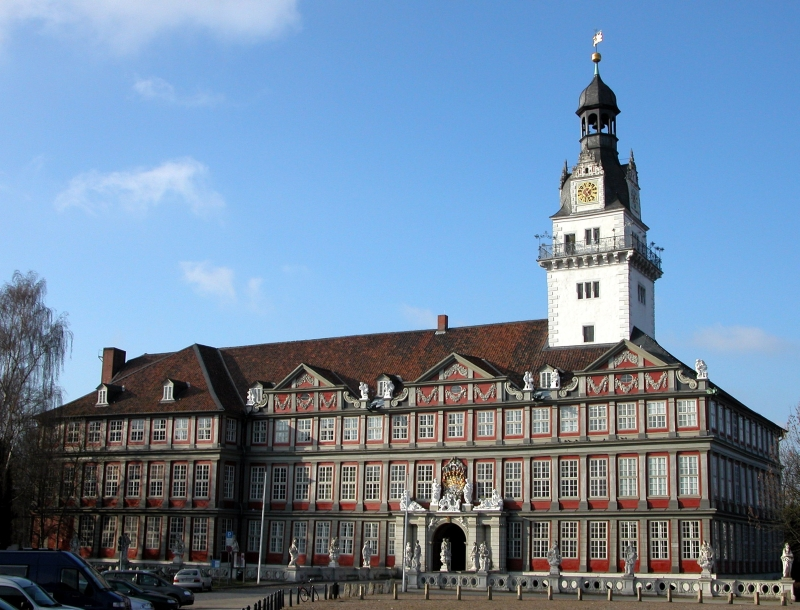
Schloss Wolfenbüttel

In the Thirty Years War Wolfenbüttel was the strongest fortress in North Germany but survived the war heavily damaged. The Wolfenbüttel line died out during the war.

In 1571 the castle and village of Calvörde became part of the principality thanks to Duke Julius of Brunswick.

In 1635 Duke Augustus the Younger, from the collateral line of Lüneburg-Dannenberg, took over the reins of power in the principality and founded the New House of Brunswick. Under his rule, Wolfenbüttel reached its cultural zenith. One of his greatest achievements was the building of the Wolfenbüttel Library, the largest in Europe in its day. In 1671 an old pipe dream of the House of Welf dukes came true when the joint armies of the different dynastic lines were able to capture the town of Brunswick and add it to their domain.

In 1735 when the dynastic line died out another collateral line emerged: the Brunswick-Bevern line founded in 1666.

In 1753–1754 the residence of the dukes of Wolfenbüttel returned to Brunswick, to the newly built Brunswick Palace.

The town thus lost the independence it had enjoyed since the 15th century. In the process, the duke followed the trend and did not interfere with anything, including work on the new castle, begun in 1718 by Hermann Korb on the Grauer Hof which was still not finished. The effect on Wolfenbüttel was catastrophic, as can be seen from the timber-framed houses built later on. 4,000 townsfolk followed the ducal family and Wolfenbüttel's population sank from 12,000 to 7,000. Only the archives, the ecclesiastical office and the library remained as a link to earlier times. From Brunswick there were jibes that Wolfenbüttel had deteriorated into a "widows' residence" (Witwensitz).

The extensive gardens in front of the three town gates (the Herzogtor, Harztor and Augusttor) were leased to the former gardeners as an emphyteusis. As a consequence jam factories were established which were characteristic of Wolfenbüttel until the 20th century. In front of the Herzogtor, the number of gardens grew, until they eventually reached the Lechlum Wood (Lechlumer Holz). Its southern edge was graced by the little Lustschloss of Antoinettenruh, built in 1733 instead of a garden house, a work by the master builder, Hermann Korb, who was so important to Wolfenbüttel. Wolfenbüttel became a town of schools. In 1753 the teachers' training college was founded, which began in the orphanage and later moved to the building of the present-day Harztorwall School.

Politically Brunswick-Wolfenbüttel was one of Prussia's closest allies. Whilst shortly beforehand the Habsburg emperor had been the most important focal point through political marriages, the Wolfenbüttel line of the Welfs became closely linked to the Hohenzollerns through the marriage of the Prussian Crown Prince Frederick to Elisabeth Christine. The marriage was arranged by Frederick William I of Prussia and Ferdinand Albert. They also founded the "brotherhood in arms" between the little state and the great Prussian kingdom. Numerous Brunswick-Wolfenbüttel officers served in high positions in the Prussian Army, most notably during the Seven Years' War. The regiments of the principality screened the allied army in western Prussia and, in particular, the allied Electorate of Hanover. An outstanding representative of the military alliance between Brunswick and Prussia was the Duke of Brunswick and Lüneburg, the hereditary Prince Ferdinand of Brunswick-Wolfenbüttel.

During Charles I's era, there were great achievements in the cultural and scientific fields: the theatre was promoted and education encouraged. In 1753 the ducal art and natural history collection—forerunner of the Natural History Museum—was founded. These substantial collections had been amassed by the Brunswick dukes. This enterprise was supported by Abbot Jerusalem, the founder of the Collegium Carolinum. Whilst Wolfenbüttel waned, Brunswick now experienced a cultural boom.

In August 1784 Johann Wolfgang von Goethe stayed in Brunswick on a political mission, when he accompanied the Weimarsch minister, his duke, Charles Augustus. At a time when the political situation between Austria and Prussia had heated up once again, the small and medium-sized German states planned the creation of a larger princely state as a counterbalancing force. Duke Charles William Ferdinand of Brunswick was to be asked to join this league of princes (Fürstenbund) which he did on 30 August.

The secret mission was disguised as a family visit at the time of the Autumn Fair. Court life determined the timing of the stay in the Residenz castle on Bohlweg.

=== Napoleonic era and transfer to the Duchy of Brunswick ===
As a result of the German Mediatisation of 25 February 1803 the principality was given the territories of the secularised imperial abbeys of Gandersheim and Helmstedt. In 1806 Duke Charles William Ferdinand was mortally wounded as a Prussian general in the Battle of Auerstedt. After a short interregnum Brunswick was occupied from 1807 to 1813 by the French and became part of the Kingdom of Westphalia.

After the end of Napoleonic rule the state was re-established under the name of the Duchy of Brunswick.

== Collateral line in Bevern ==
The Principality of Brunswick-Wolfenbüttel-Bevern emerged from an inheritance dispute between Ferdinand Albert I and his brothers. In 1667 Ferdinand Albert was awarded the castle of Bevern near Holzminden. He — and later his son Ferdinand Albert II — were princes of Brunswick-Wolfenbüttel-Bevern. In 1735 Ferdinand Albert II took over the Principality of Brunswick-Wolfenbüttel, the subordinate principality returning to the overarching Principality of Brunswick-Wolfenbüttel.

== Economic and social history ==
=== The role of farmers ===
According to Bornstedt serfdom in the state was abolished with the "Recess of 17 May 1433" by Henry the Peaceful. According to Bornstedt, Brunswick-Wolfenbüttel was therefore the first principality in the Holy Roman Empire to do away with feudalism. The recess laid down that all arbitrariness (Willkür) in the levies on stewards, or Meier, of feudal manors, particularly on the death of the farmer, were cancelled. the Grundherr or 'lord of the manor' continued to be the owner of the Meier estate, but now the Meier could also quit. This change usually meant that the Meier family did not move out when the contract expired or when the farmer died; i.e. that the family were not prematurely evicted as would have been the case before. In 1563 it was decreed by Henry the Younger that every 6 years Meier and Grundherr had to negotiate the extension of the estate lease; later this was increased to 9 years. In his Landtag farewell in 1597, "Duke" Henry Julius made the farms inheritable.

With the Brunswick redemption law (Ablösungsordnung) of 20 December 1834 by the state's legal successor, the Duchy of Brunswick, the dependence of the farmers was abolished. Farmers could now purchase the land freehold and the money required could be loaned from the ducal lending office. At the end of the 19th century Flurbereinigung or land consolidation took place.

== See also ==
- List of the rulers of Brunswick-Wolfenbüttel
- List of rulers of the House of Welf

== Sources ==
- Wilhelm Havemann: Geschichte der Lande Braunschweig und Lüneburg. 3 vols. Repr. Hirschheydt, Hannover 1974–75, ISBN 3-7777-0843-7 (Original ed: Verlag der Dietrich'schen Buchhandlung, Göttingen 1853–1857, online at Google Books) (in German)
- Hans Patze (et al.): Geschichte Niedersachsens. 7 vols. Hahnsche Buchhandlung, Hannover 1977- (Veröffentlichungen der Historischen Kommission für Niedersachsen und Bremen, 36) (in German) (Publisher's summary)
- Gudrun Pischke: Die Landesteilungen der Welfen im Mittelalter. Lax, Hildesheim 1987, ISBN 3-7848-3654-2 (in German)
