= Henry the Mild, Duke of Brunswick-Lüneburg =

14th-century German nobleman

Henry the Mild
- Duke of Brunswick-Lüneburg
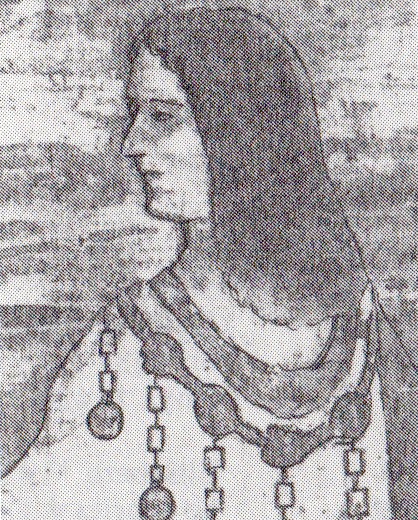
- Born: after 1358
- Died: 14 October 1416
- Noble family: House of Guelph
- Spouses: Sophie of Pomerania; Margaret of Hesse
- Issue: William; Catherine; Henry
- Father: Magnus II, Duke of Brunswick-Lüneburg
- Mother: Catherine of Anhalt-Bernburg

Henry of Brunswick-Lüneburg (Latin Henricus; died 14 October 1416), Duke of Brunswick-Lüneburg, was called Henry the Mild. He was the prince of Lüneburg from 1388 to 1409 jointly with his brother Bernard I, Duke of Brunswick-Lüneburg, from 1400 to 1409, and also of Wolfenbüttel, and from 1409 until his death sole prince of Lüneburg.

Henry was the fourth son of Magnus with the Necklace, Duke of Brunswick-Lüneburg. He participated in the prosecution of the murderers of his brother Frederick, who was elected King of the Romans after 1400. Henry ravaged the Eichsfeld, a possession of the archbishop of Mainz, who was suspected of involvement in the murder. Only in 1405 was a peace ratified between Brunswick-Lüneburg and the Archbishopric.

In 1404, Henry was kidnapped by Bernard VI, Count of Lippe; when he paid a ransom, he was released, and later, with the support of King Rupert, took revenge on Bernard.

After the death of Gerhard, Count of Schleswig, Henry's sister's husband, Queen Margaret I of Denmark attempted to take control of Schleswig. However, Henry, together with Holstein, successfully defended Schleswig.

== Family ==
Henry married Sophie (died 1406), daughter of Wartislaw VI, Duke of Pomerania, in 1388. Children were:

- William (c. 1392–1482)
- Catherine (1395–1442), married Frederick I, Elector of Saxony

Henry married Margaret (c. 1389–1446), daughter of Hermann II, Landgrave of Hesse, in 1409. They had one known child:

- Henry (c. 1411–1473)

Henry the Mild, Duke of Brunswick-Lüneburg House of Welf Cadet branch of the House of Este Born: about 1355 Died: 14 October 1416
German nobility
Preceded by Wenceslaus	Duke of Brunswick-Lüneburg; Prince of Lüneburg until 1409 joint rule with his brother Bernard I 1388–1416	Succeeded by William the Victorious and his brother Henry the Peaceful
Preceded by Frederick I	Duke of Brunswick-Lüneburg; Prince of Brunswick-Wolfenbüttel joint reign with his brother Bernard I 1400–1409	Succeeded by Bernard I
