= List of princes of Lüneburg =

Coat of arms of the Principality of Lüneburg

The following is a list of all princes of Lüneburg during its time as an independent principality.

The Principality of Lüneburg (German: Fürstentum Lüneburg), later also called Celle, was a territory within the Holy Roman Empire that existed from 1269 to 1705, whose land covered part of the modern-day German state of Lower Saxony. The territory was granted imperial immediacy which gave it the special status of reporting directly to the emperor. It emerged in 1269 following the division of the Duchy of Brunswick-Lüneburg, and its rulers continued to use the title of dukes of Brunswick-Lüneburg. Lüneburg lost its independence in 1705 when it was inherited by the Principality of Calenberg (also known as Hanover), which however could keep a separate seat in the Reichstag for Lüneburg or "Brunswick-Celle".

== Princes of Lüneburg ==
=== Old House of Lüneburg ===
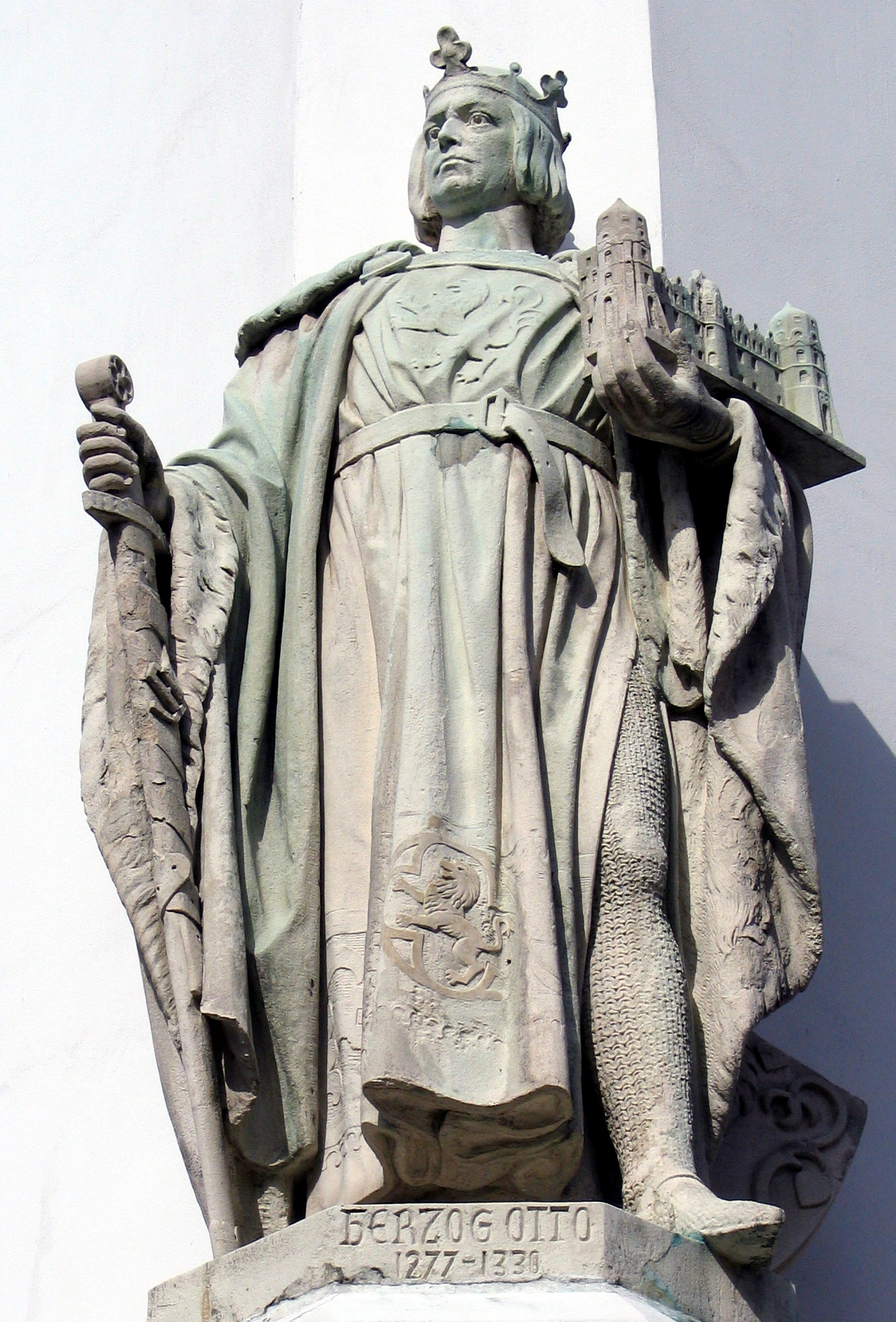
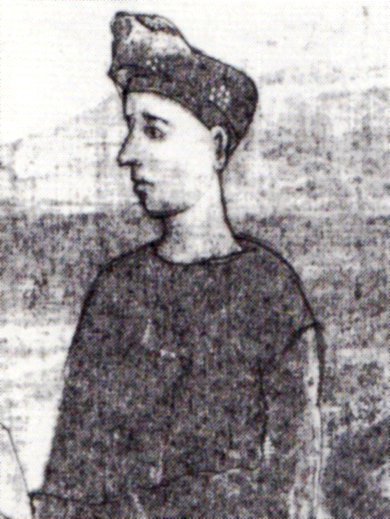
Portrait	Name	Rule	Remarks
	John (1242-1277)	1269 - 1277	Following the division of the Duchy of Brunswick-Lüneburg, John was the first ruler of the new Principality of Lüneburg.
	Otto II the Strict (1266-1330)	1277 - 1330	Otto II of Brunswick-Lüneburg after Otto the Child (Otto I of Brunswick-Lüneburg)
	Otto III (1296-1352)	1330 - 1352
	William († 1369)	1330 - 1369	William II of Brunswick-Lüneburg. His death precipitated the Lüneburg War of Succession in 1370.

=== Old House of Brunswick ===
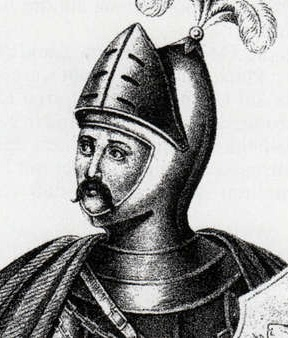
Portrait	Name	Rule	Remarks
	Magnus Torquatus (1328-1373)	1369 - 1373	Magnus II. "Magnus with the Necklace." 2nd cousin, once removed, of William II

=== Dukes of Saxe-Wittenberg ===
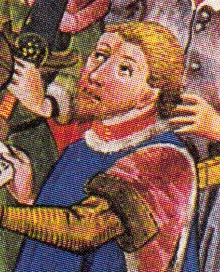
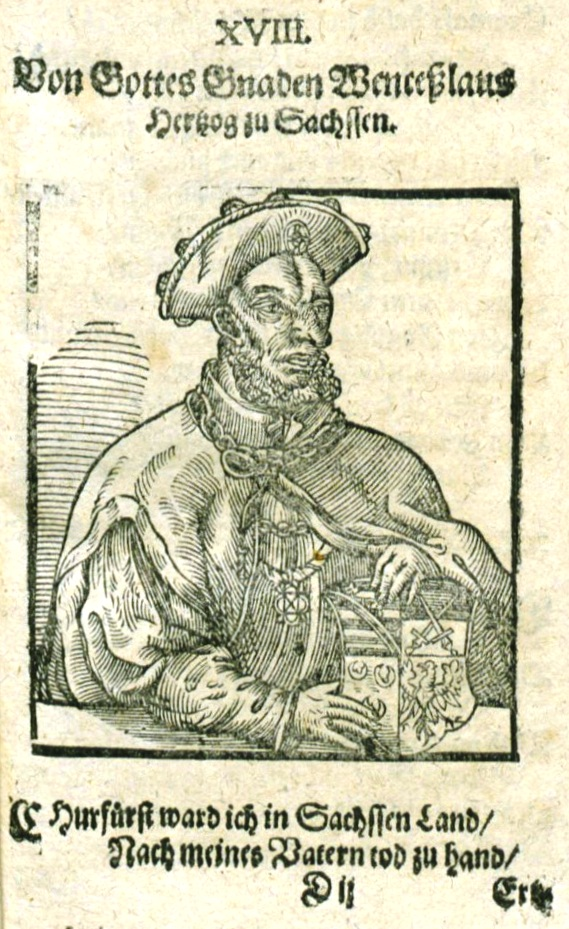
Portrait	Name	Rule	Remarks
	Albert of Saxe-Wittenberg (d 1385)	1370 - 1385	Albert moved the residence to Celle after the slighting of Lüneburg Castle.
	Wenceslas of Saxe-Wittenberg (d 1388)	1370 - 1388

=== Middle House of Brunswick ===
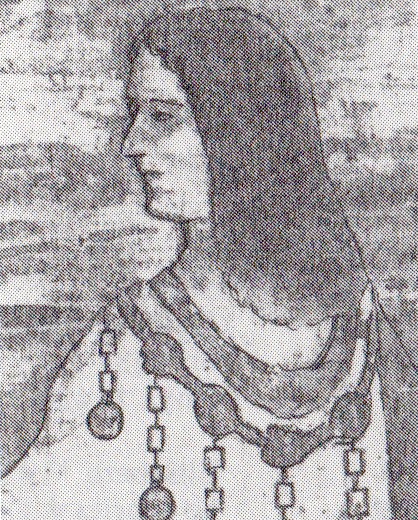
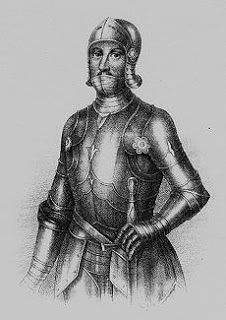
Portrait	Name	Rule	Remarks
	Henry I the Mild (d 1416)	1388 - 1416
	William the Victorious (1392-1482)	1416 - 1428
	Henry II the Peaceful (1411-1473)	1416 - 1428

=== Middle House of Lüneburg ===
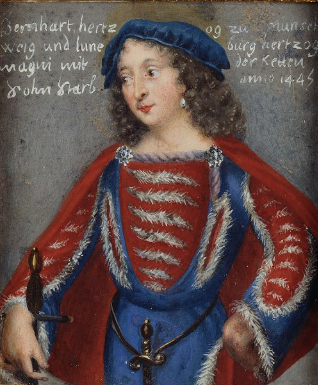
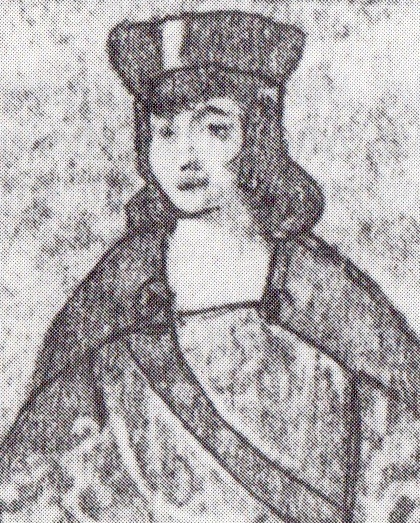
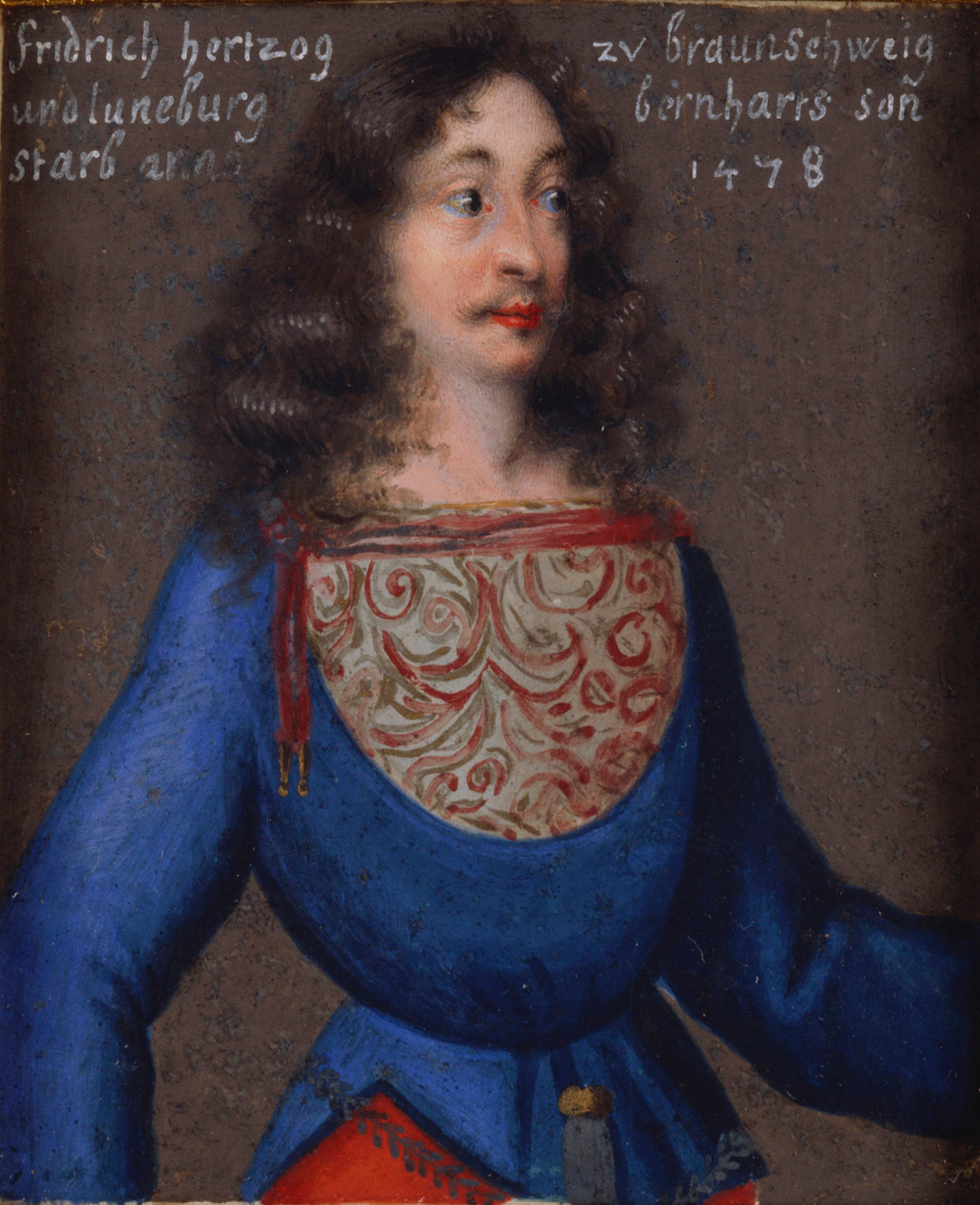
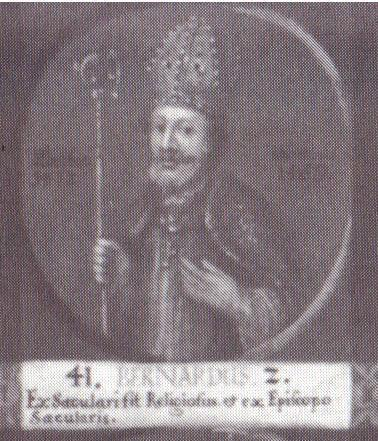
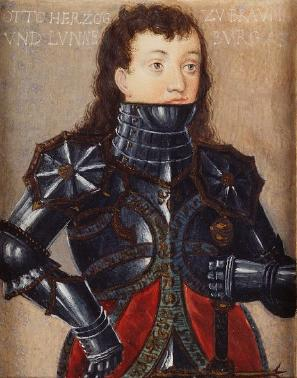
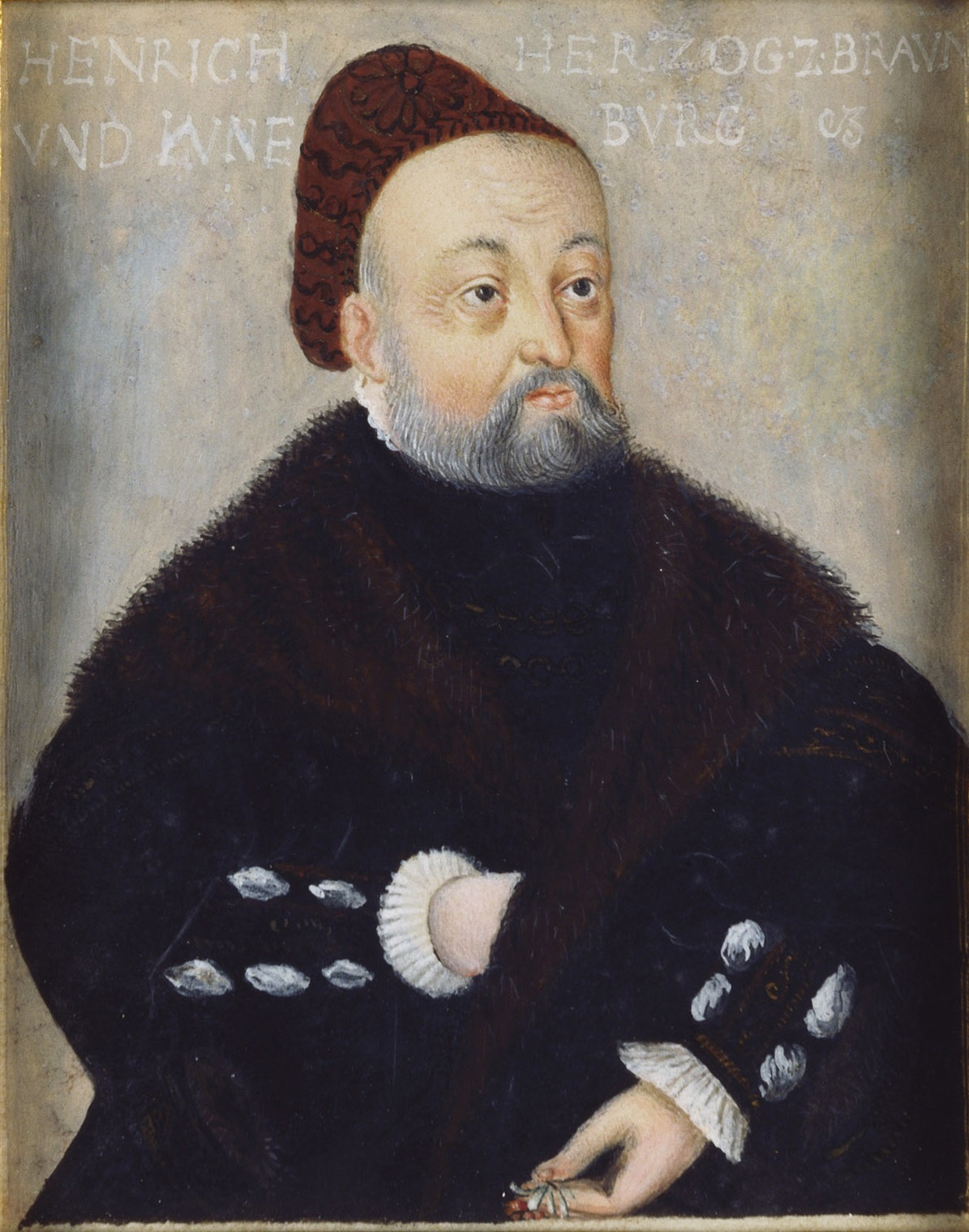
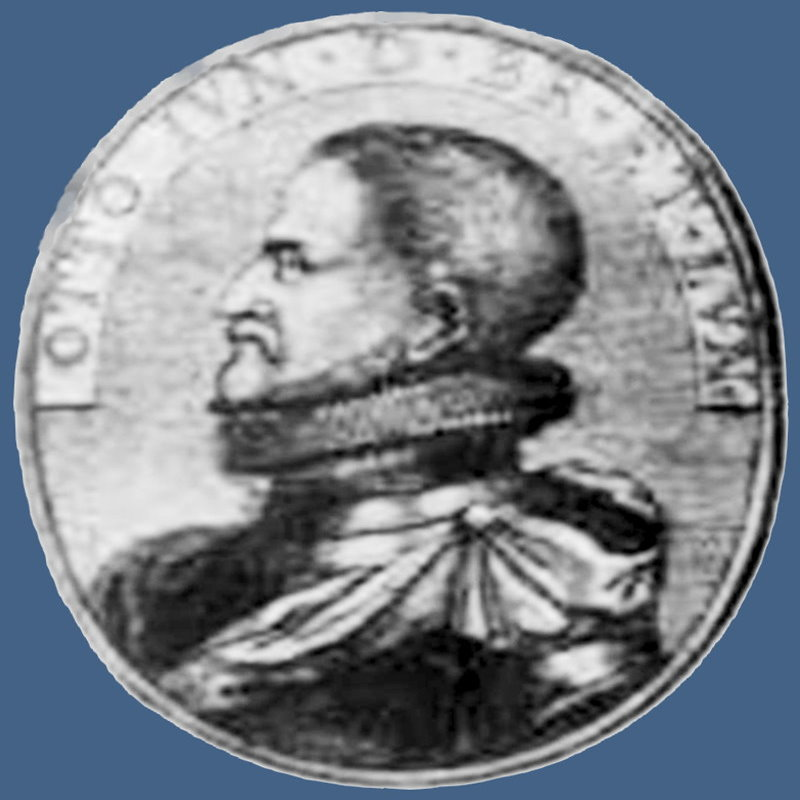
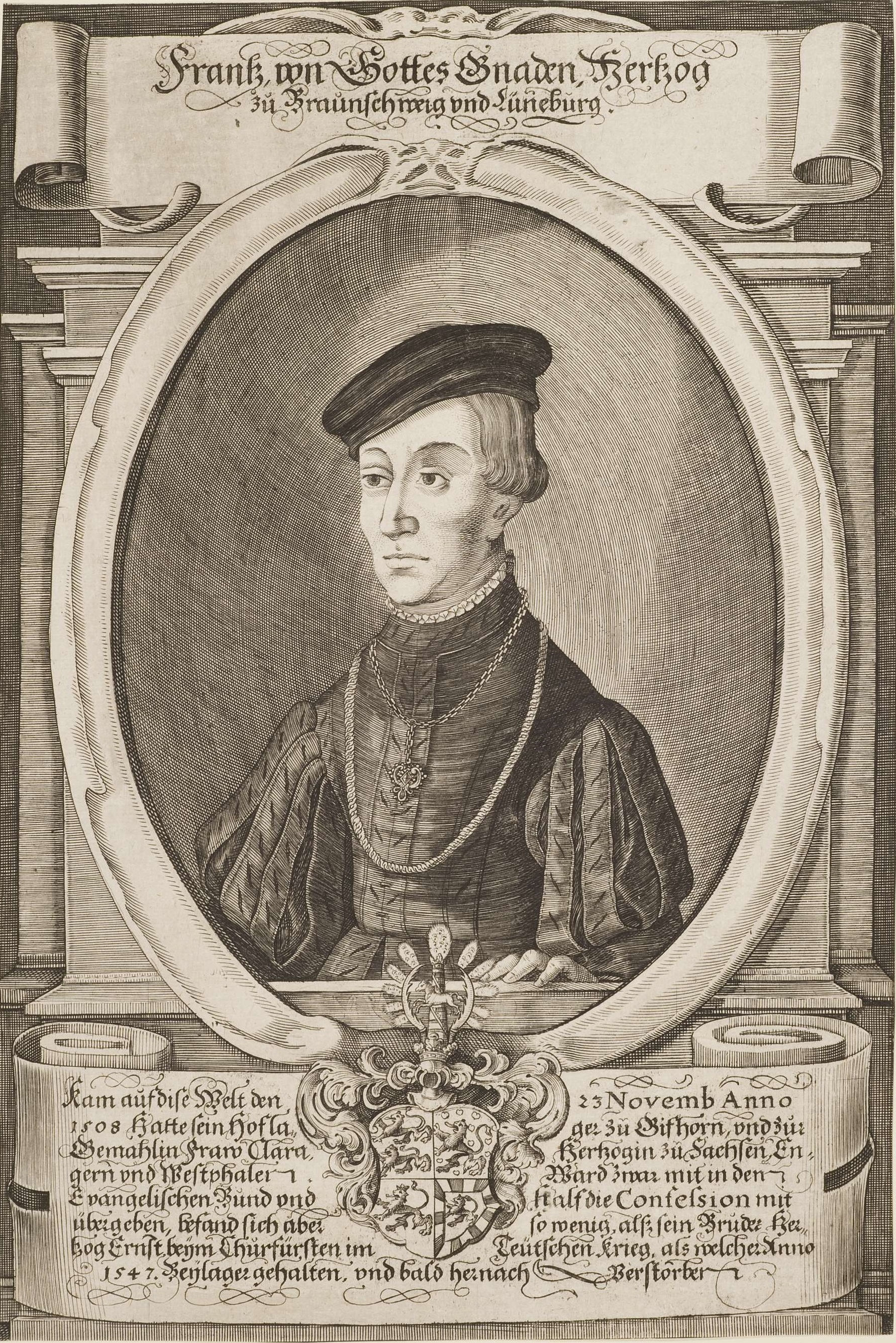
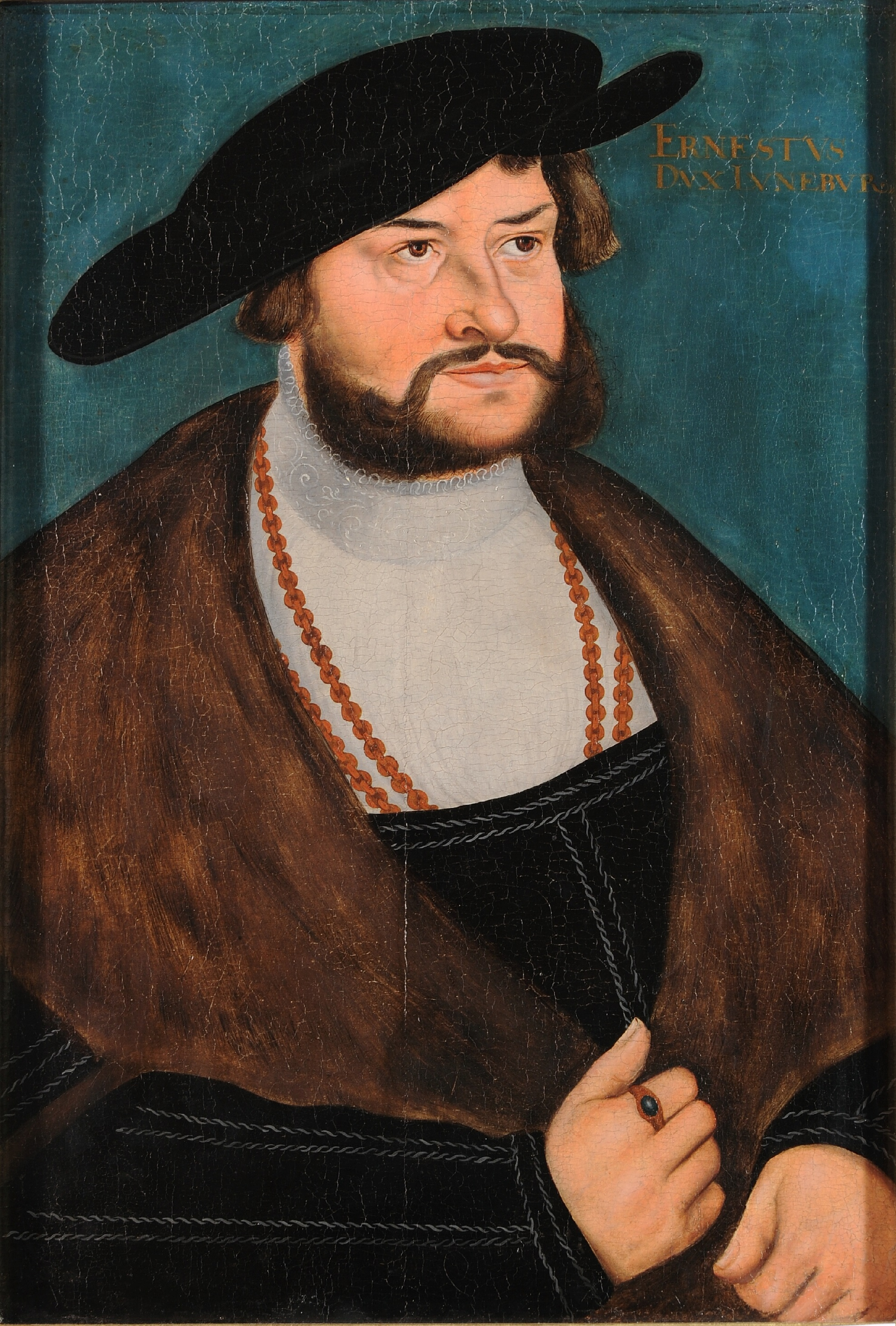
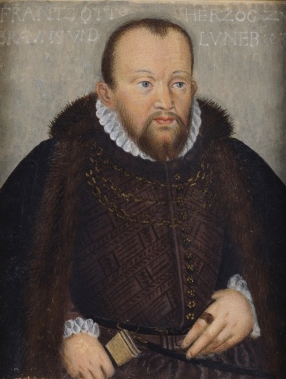
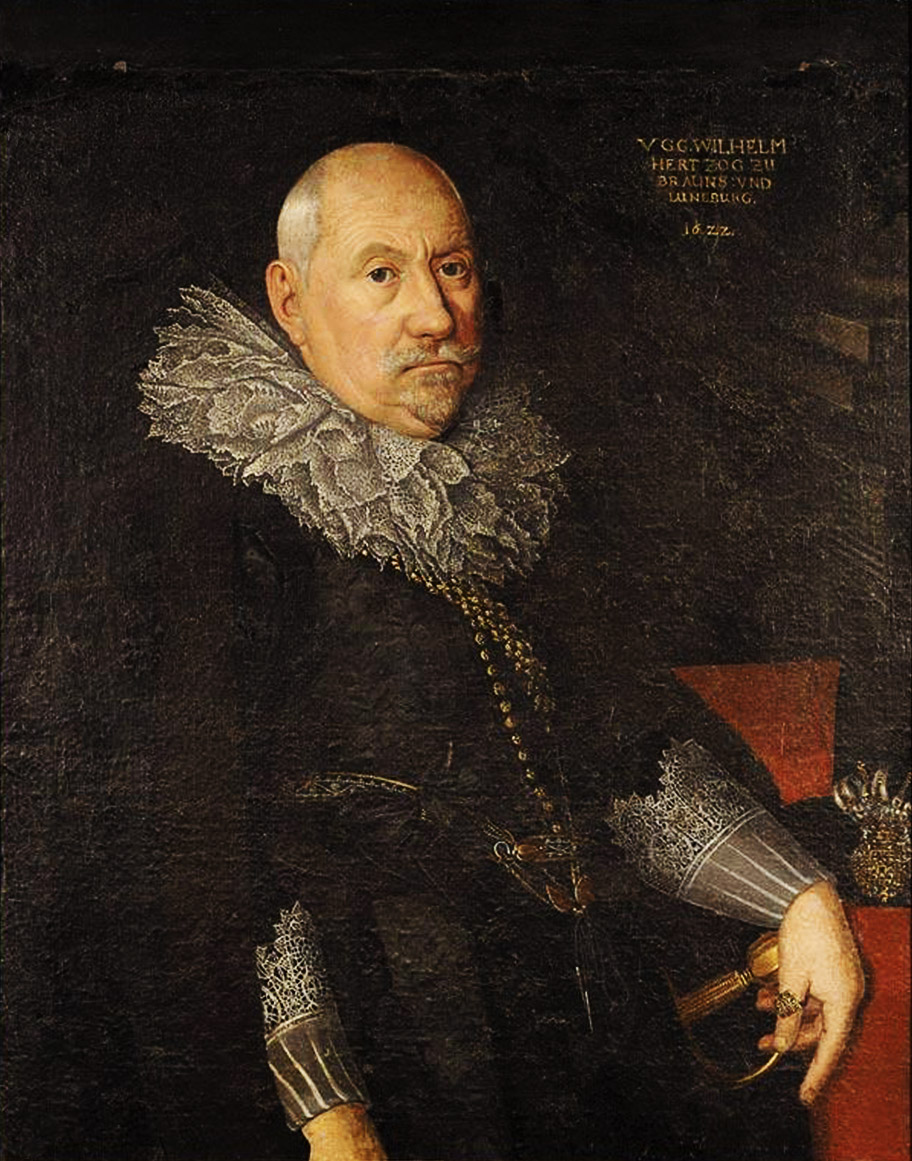
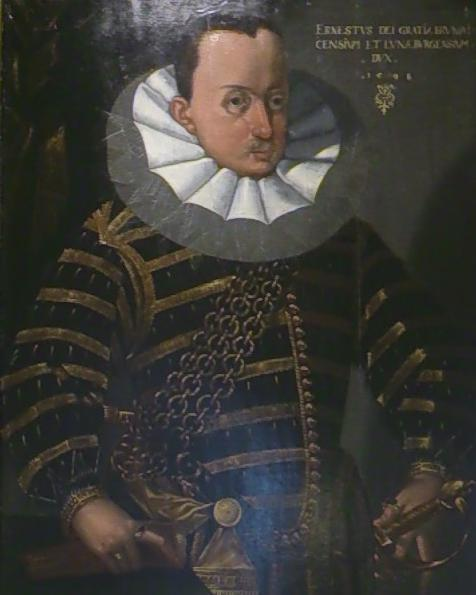
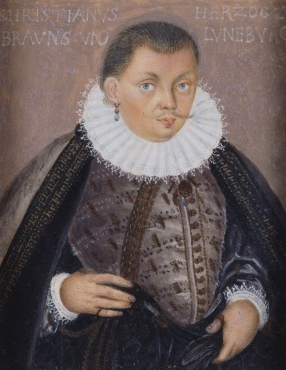
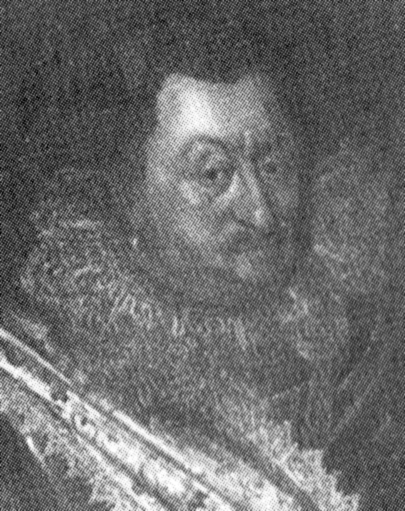
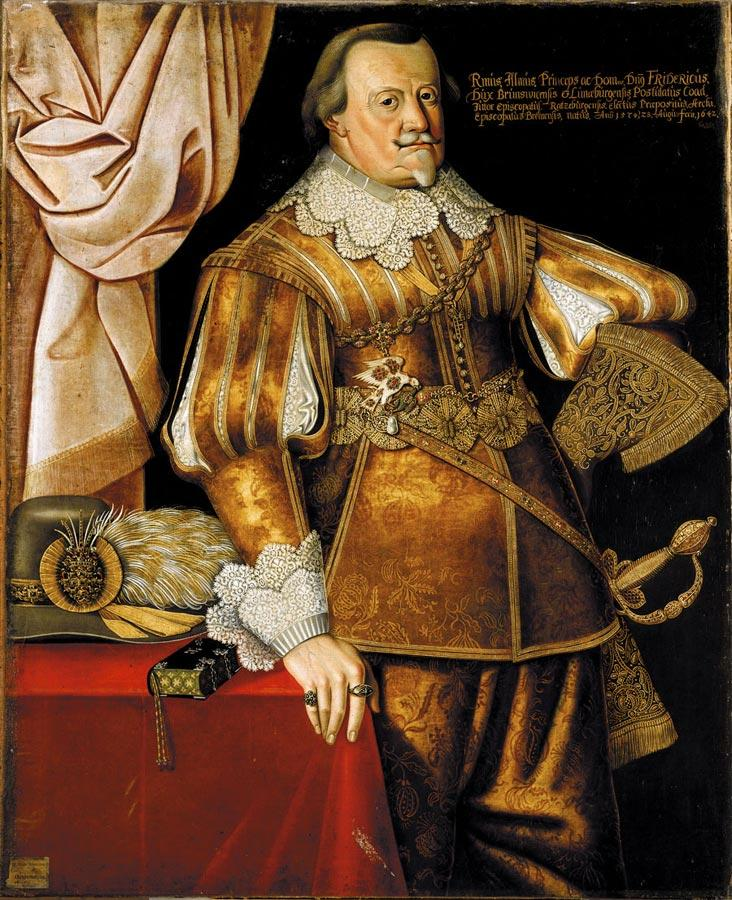
Portrait	Name	Rule	Remarks
	Bernard I (d 1434)	1388 - 1409 and 1428 - 1434
	Otto I the Lame (d 1446)	1434 - 1446	Otto IV of Brunswick-Lüneburg. Also "Otto Crookleg".
	Frederick the Pious (d 1478)	1434 - 1457 and 1472 - 1478	Frederick II
	Bernard II (1432-1464)	1457 - 1464	Also Prince-Bishop of Hildesheim as Bernard III (1452–1458)
	Otto II the Magnanimous (1439-1471)	1457 - 1471	Otto V of Brunswick-Lüneburg
	Henry I of Lüneburg (1468-1532)	1486 - 1520
	Otto I of Harburg (1495-1549)	1520 - 1527	Otto VI of Brunswick-Lüneburg
	Francis (1508-1549)	1536 - 1539
	Ernest the Confessor (1497-1546)	1520 - 1546	Ernest I. Introduced the Reformation into the Principality of Lüneburg in 1527. He was also the progenitor of the Calenberg-Celle and Wolfenbüttel lines
	Francis Otto (1530-1559)	1555 - 1559
	Henry of Dannenberg (1533-1598)	1559 - 1569	Henry III
	William the Younger (1535-1592)	1559 - 1592
	Ernest II (1564-1611)	1592 - 1611
	Christian (1566-1633)	1611 - 1633
	Augustus the Elder (1568-1636)	1633 - 1636	Augustus
	Frederick (1571-1648)	1636 - 1648

=== New House of Lüneburg ===
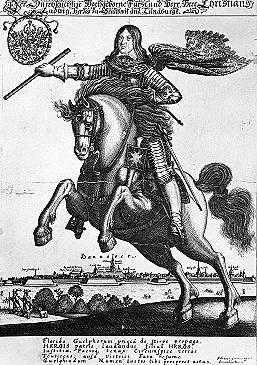
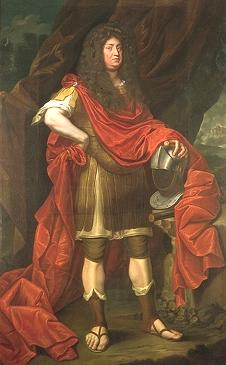
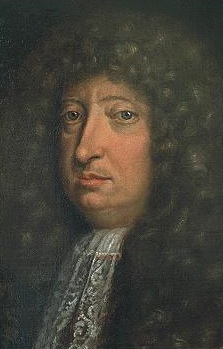
Portrait	Name	Ruled from	To	Remarks
	Christian Louis; Christian Ludwig	10 December 1648	15 March 1665	Nephew of the previous duke; he was already Duke of Brunswick-Calenberg, which he resigned to his next brother to take up the rule of this duchy.
	John Frederick (1625-1679); Johann Friedrich	1665
	George William; Georg Wilhelm	15 March 1665	28 August 1705	Brother of Christian Louis, previously ruler of Brunswick-Calenberg

In 1705 the Principality of Lüneburg was united with the Electorate of Brunswick-Lüneburg through inheritance.

== See also ==
- List of consorts of Lüneburg
- List of the rulers of Brunswick-Wolfenbüttel

== Sources ==
- Geckler, Christa (1986). Die Celler Herzöge: Leben und Wirken 1371–1705. Celle: Georg Ströher. ISBN 3-921744-05-8. OCLC 255990175.
- William Havemann: Geschichte the Lande Brunswick und Lüneburg, 3 Bde., Nachdruck. Hirschheydt, Hannover 1974/75, ISBN 3-7777-0843-7 (Originalausgabe: Verlag the Dietrich'schen Buchhandlung, Göttingen 1853–1857)
- Hans Patze (Begr.): Geschichte Niedersachsen, 7 Bde. Hahnsche Buchhandlung, Hannover 1977- (Veröffentlichungen the Historischen Kommission für Niedersachsen und Bremen, 36)
