= George William, Duke of Brunswick =

George William
- Duke of Saxe-Lauenburg
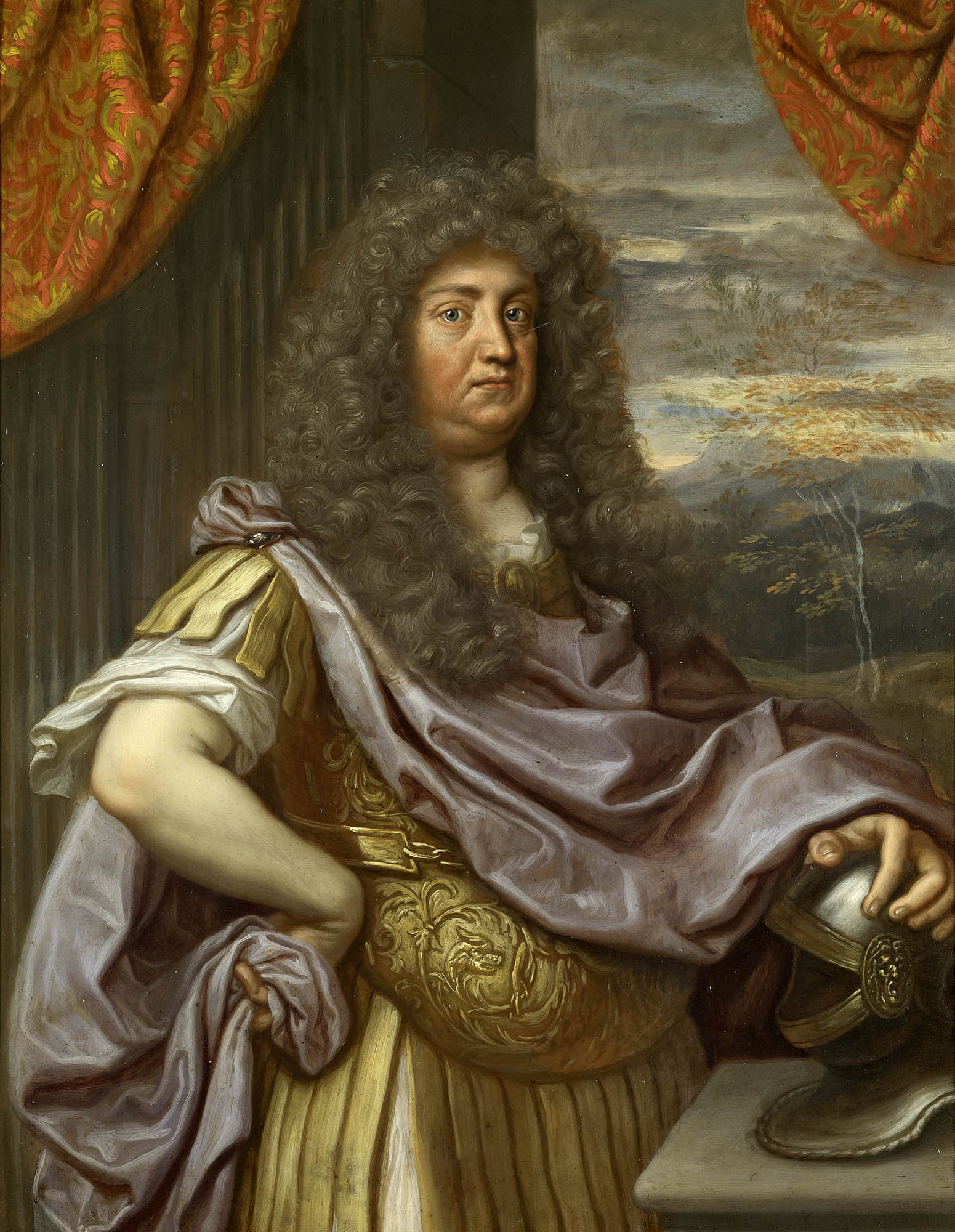
- Anonymous portrait c. 1660–1679
- Born: 26 January 1624; Herzberg am Harz, Germany
- Died: 28 August 1705 (aged 81); Wienhausen, Germany
- Burial: Stadtkirche, Celle, Germany
- Spouse: Eleonore d'Esmier d'Olbreuse (m. 1665)
- Issue: Sophia Dorothea, Electoral Princess of Hanover
- House: Hanover
- Father: George, Duke of Brunswick-Lüneburg
- Mother: Anne Eleonore of Hesse-Darmstadt

George William (German: Georg Wilhelm; 26 January 1624 – 28 August 1705) was the first Welf Duke of Lauenburg after its occupation in 1689. From 1648 to 1665, he was the ruler of the Principality of Calenberg as an appanage from his eldest brother, Christian Louis, Prince of Luneburg. When he inherited Luneburg on the latter's death in 1665, he gave Calenberg to his younger brother, John Frederick.

Nevertheless, he only kept the sub-division of Celle, giving the rest of Luneburg to their youngest brother Ernest Augustus, whose son, George Ludwig (future King of Great Britain), inherited Saxe-Lauenburg and Celle from George William. His only daughter, Sophia Dorothea of Celle, was George Ludwig's wife.

== Biography ==
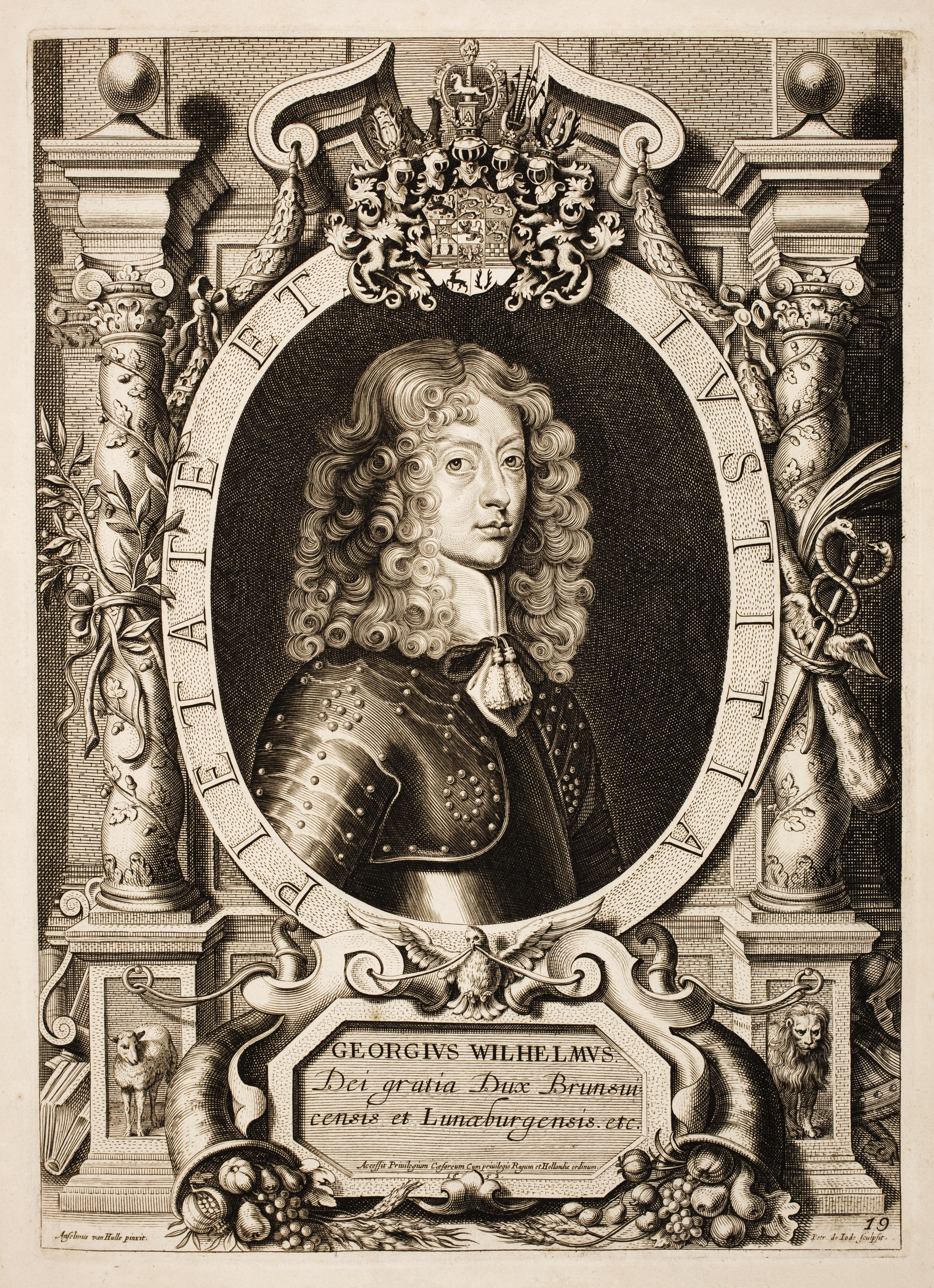
Portrait of Georg Wilhelm after Anselm van Hulle by Pieter de Jode II

George William was born in Herzberg am Harz, the second son of George, Prince of Calenberg. He had an elder brother, two younger brothers, and several sisters, including Queen Sophia Amalie of Denmark.

=== Succession ===
In 1648, when George William's elder brother, Christian Louis, Prince of Calenberg, inherited the Principality of Lüneburg from their paternal uncle, Frederick IV, he gave Calenberg to George William in appanage. Seventeen years later, in 1665, Christian Louis himself died childless, and George William inherited Luneburg as well. He then gave Calenberg to his next brother, John Frederick.

The renunciation of claim to Luneburg had in fact happened seven years previously, in 1658. In exchange for being freed from the obligation to marry Princess Sophia of the Palatinate, George William ceded his claim on inheriting Lüneburg to his youngest brother Ernest Augustus, settling for the smaller duchy of Celle and promising to remain unmarried so that he would produce no legitimate heir who might pose a challenge to his brother's claim to Luneburg. The absence of heirs would also mean that Celle would lapse back into Luneburg; Celle was only supposed to give George William an income for his lifetime. After reaching this agreement, George William's youngest brother, Ernest Augustus, married Sophia and became the Duke of Hanover.

=== Marriage and issue ===
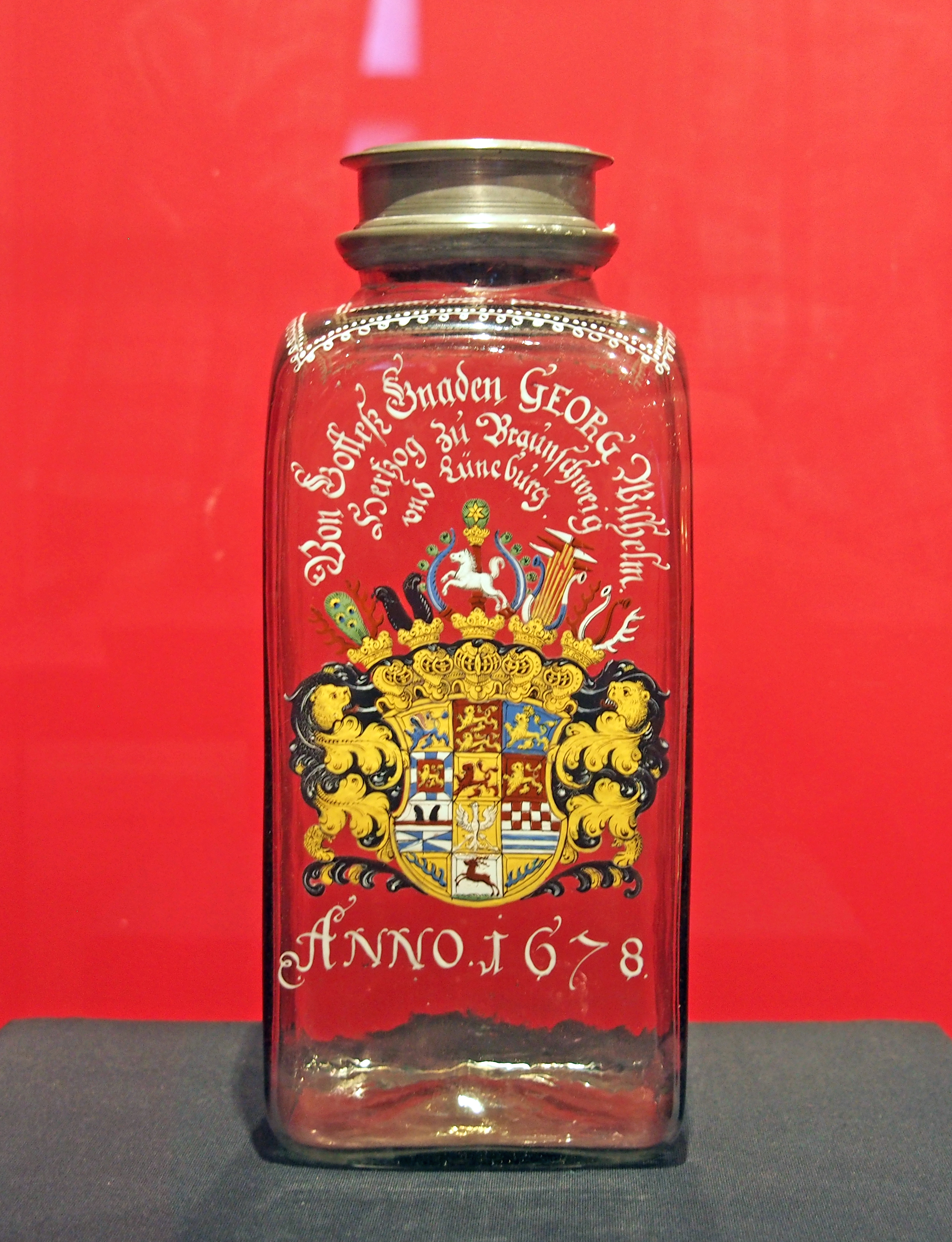
Bottle (dated 1678) with the arms of George William, Duke of Brunswick

This renunciation left George William free to marry whoever he wished, and indulge his desires to travel and socialize, without being encumbered by considerations of state. In 1665, George William entered into a morganatic marriage with his long-time mistress, Eleanor, Countess of Wilhelmsburg. In 1666, their only child and daughter, Sophia Dorothea, was born.

By 1676, it had become quite clear that among the four brothers (George William and three others), only the youngest, Ernest Augustus, had produced any heirs male, and that the entire duchy of Luneburg was likely to be united under Ernest Augustus's eldest son George Louis. George William therefore wanted George Louis to marry his daughter Sophia, whose marriage prospects were otherwise not bright, given the circumstances of her birth. To George William's annoyance, George Louis and his parents refused the proposal on the grounds of status. At this point (in 1676), to improve the status of Eleonore and their daughter, and in open violation of his promise, George William legitimized his daughter and declared that his marriage to Eleonore was not morganatic but valid to both church and state. This development greatly alarmed his relatives, as it threatened to hinder the contemplated union of the Lüneburg territories. Indeed, if George William had had a son, a serious succession crisis could have arisen. No son however was born, and in 1682, George Louis' parents finally agreed to the proposed marriage as a way of avoiding uncertainty and dispute. Sophia married George Louis in 1682. They had a son and heir the following year, named George after his father and maternal grandfather: the future George II of Britain.

=== Duke of Saxe-Lauenburg ===
In 1689, Julius Francis, Duke of Saxe-Lauenburg, died leaving no son and no accepted heir male, but only two daughters, Anna Maria and Sibylle. The duchy had followed the Salic law since time immemorial, but Duke Julius Francis decided to nominate his elder daughter as his heir and proclaimed laws permitting female succession in his duchy. This self-serving innovation was not accepted by senior members of his dynasty (the other potential successors) and a succession crisis ensued.

George William was one of the nearest and senior-most male-line claimants to the succession. Shortly after the death of the duke, George William invaded the duchy with his troops and occupied it. The other claimants included the five Ascanian-ruled Principalities of Anhalt, Saxony, Saxe-Wittenberg, Sweden and Brandenburg, and also the neighbouring Mecklenburg-Schwerin and the Danish duchy of Holstein, whose ruler was the King of Denmark.

However, only George William and Christian V of Denmark (whose mother was George William's own sister) engaged militarily on this question. An accord was soon reached between them, and on 9 October 1693 they agreed (in the Hamburg Comparison, or Hamburger Vergleich) that George William - who now de facto held most of Saxe-Lauenburg - would retain the duchy in a personal union.

Meanwhile, the Emperor Leopold I, who had no direct claim on the duchy, occupied the Land of Hadeln, a Saxe-Lauenburgian exclave, and held it in imperial custody. Apart from that, Leopold did not attempt to use force in Saxe-Lauenburg. In 1728, his son the Emperor Charles VI finally legitimised the de facto takeover and enfeoffed George William's grandson and second successor, George II of Great Britain (who was also Elector of Hanover) with the duchy of Saxe-Lauenburg, but Hadeln remained in imperial custody until 1731, when it was also ceded to George II Augustus. George William died in Wienhausen, aged 81.

=== Other military feats ===
During the Swedish-Brandenburg War, George William participated from 1675 to 1676 in the campaign against Bremen-Verden as commander-in-chief of the allied forces against Sweden.

== Ancestry ==
Ancestors of George William, Duke of Brunswick

8. Ernest I, Duke of Brunswick-Lüneburg
4. William, Duke of Brunswick-Lüneburg
9. Sophia of Mecklenburg-Schwerin
2. George, Duke of Brunswick-Calenberg
10. Christian III of Denmark
5. Dorothea of Denmark
11. Dorothea of Saxe-Lauenburg
1. George William, Duke of Brunswick-Lüneburg
12. George I, Landgrave of Hesse-Darmstadt
6. Louis V, Landgrave of Hesse-Darmstadt
13. Magdalene of Lippe
3. Anne Eleonore of Hesse-Darmstadt
14. John George, Elector of Brandenburg
7. Magdalena von Brandenburg
15. Elisabeth of Anhalt-Zerbst

George William, Duke of Saxe-Lauenburg House of Hanover Cadet branch of the House of Welf Born: 26 January 1624 in Göttingen Died: 28 August 1705 in Celle
German nobility
Preceded by Christian Louis	Prince of Calenberg; 1648–1665	Succeeded by John Frederick
Preceded by Christian Louis	Prince of Luneburg; 1658	Succeeded by Ernest Augustus
Preceded by Himself as Prince of Luneburg	Prince of Celle; 1658-1705	Succeeded by George Louis as Elector of Hanover
Preceded by Julius Francis; House of Ascania	Duke of Saxe-Lauenburg (illegal occupation); 1689–1705	Succeeded by George Louis as Elector of Hanover

== Gallery ==
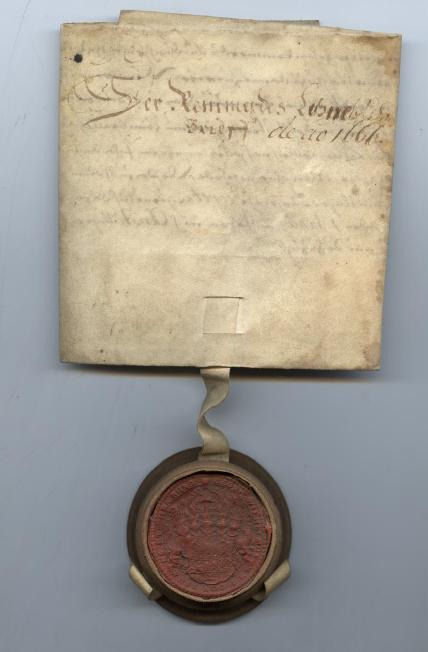
- 1666 Lehnsbriefe feudal land grant to the Reimerdes family with ducal seal of George William
