= Christian Louis, Duke of Brunswick-Lüneburg =

Duke of Brunswick-Lüneburg (1622–1665)

Christian Louis
- Duke of Brunswick-Lüneburg
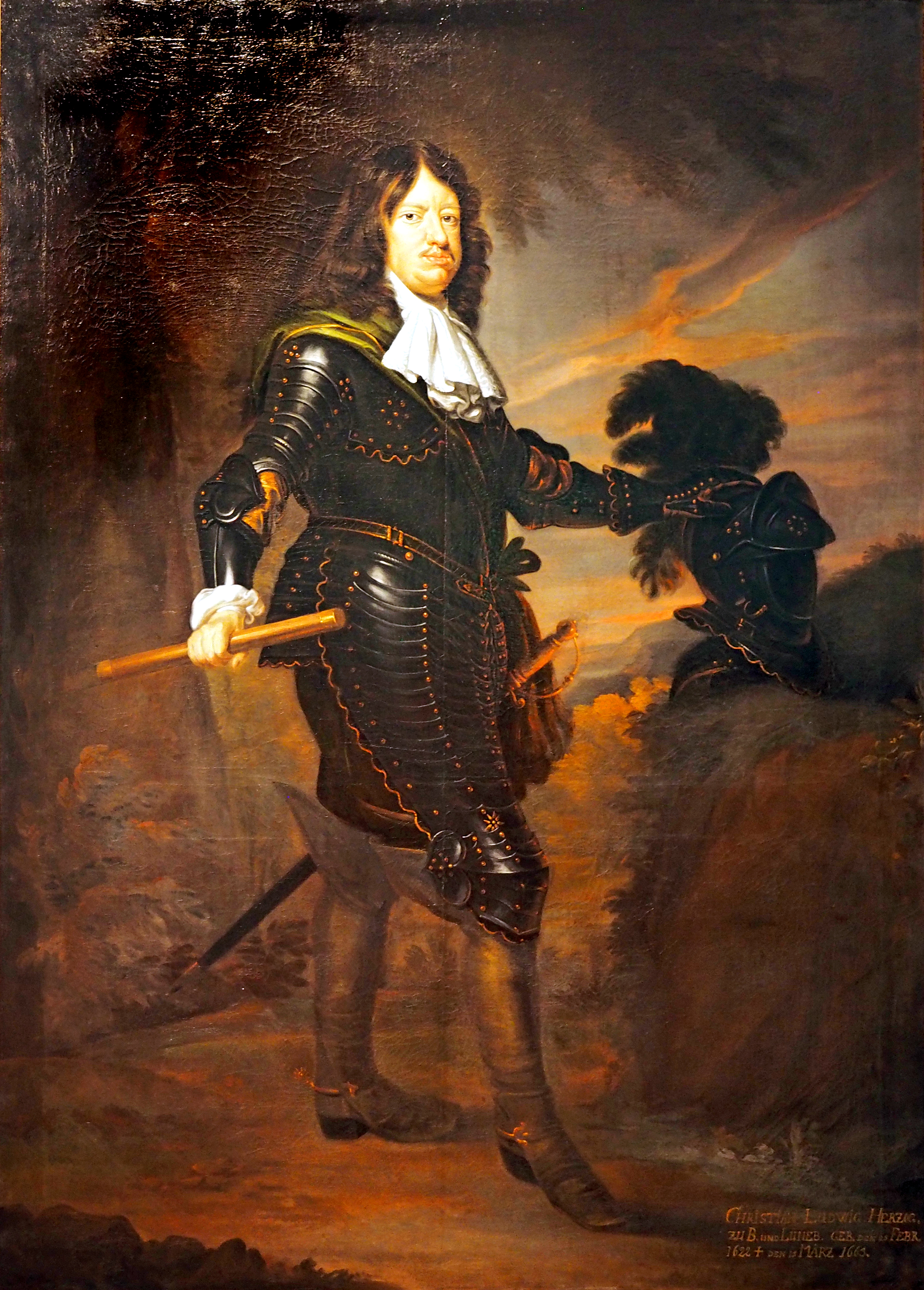
- Christian Louis, Duke of Brunswick-Lüneburg, engraving, about 1645
- Born: 25 February 1622; Herzberg am Harz
- Died: 15 March 1665 (aged 43); Celle
- Spouse: Sophia Dorothea of Schleswig-Holstein-Sonderburg-Glücksburg (m. 1653)
- House: Hanover
- Father: George, Duke of Brunswick-Lüneburg
- Mother: Anne Eleonore of Hesse-Darmstadt

Christian Louis (German: Christian Ludwig; 25 February 1622 – 15 March 1665) was Duke of Brunswick-Lüneburg. A member of the House of Welf, from 1641 until 1648, he ruled the Principality of Calenberg, a subdivision of the duchy, and, from 1648 until his death, the Principality of Lüneburg.

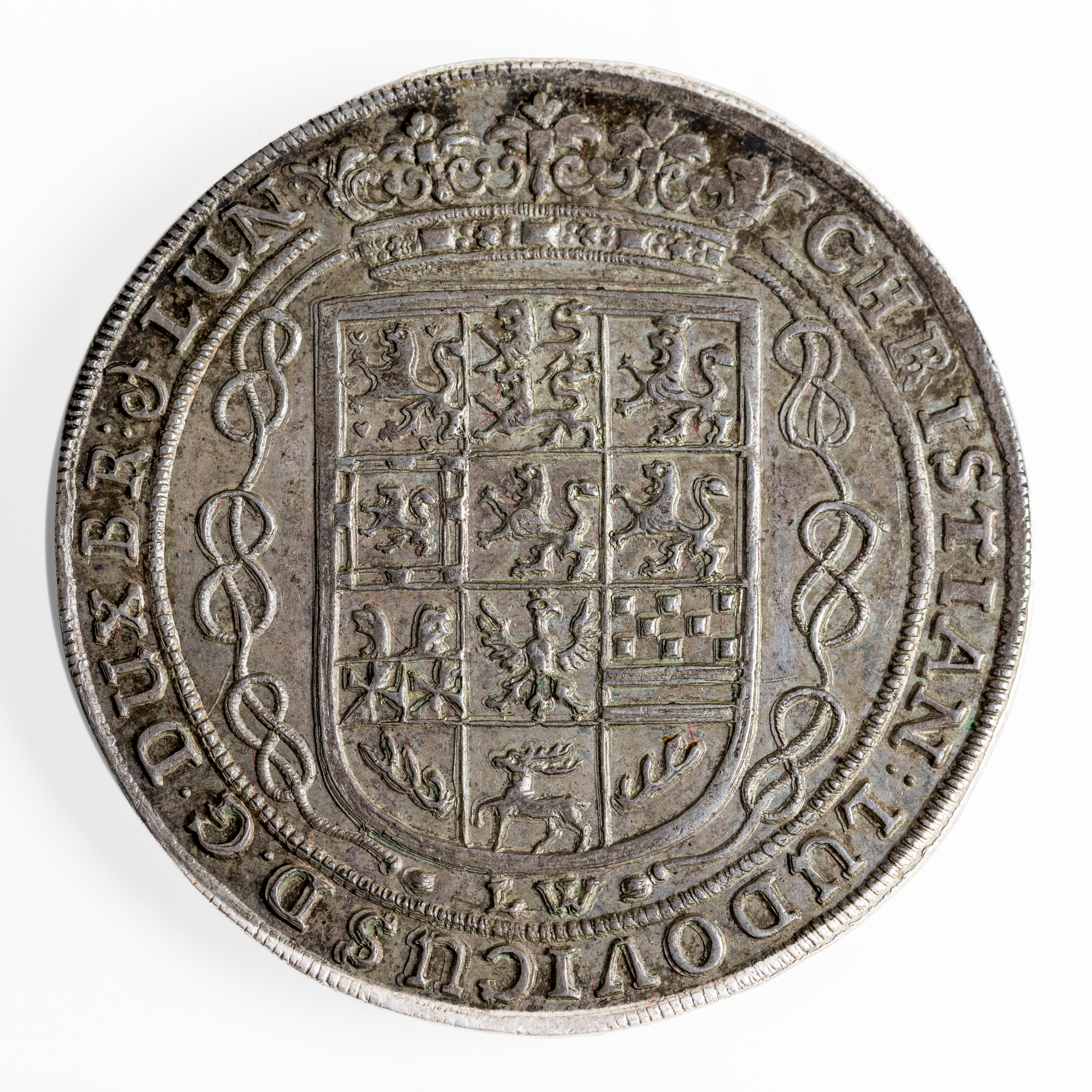
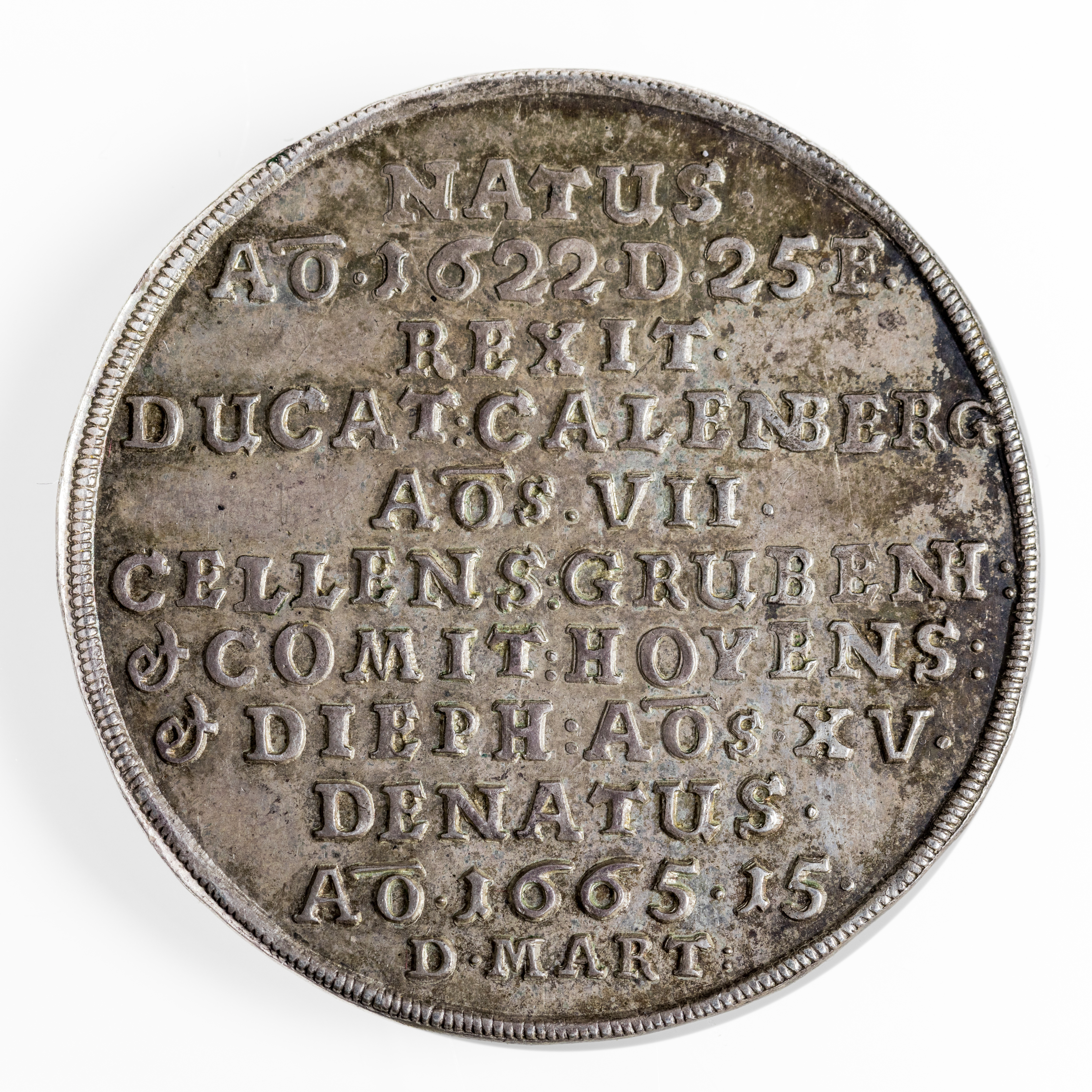
1/2 Funeral taler 1665, Christian Ludwig as Prince of Calenberg and Celle etc. (Welter 1517)

== Early life and marriage ==
Christian Louis was born in Herzberg am Harz on 25 February 1622. In 1641, he inherited the Principality of Calenberg from his father, Duke George of Brunswick-Lüneburg, who had suddenly died. Like his father, he resided at the Leineschloss in Hanover.

When in 1648, he also inherited the Principality of Lüneburg from his uncle, Frederick IV, Duke of Brunswick-Lüneburg, both subdivisions were ruled in personal union. However, Christian Louis gave Calenberg to his younger brother George William, and instead ruled the larger territory of Lüneburg at Celle Castle.

In 1642, Christian Louis became a member of the Fruitbearing Society. He married Sophia Dorothea, daughter of Duke Philipp of Schleswig-Holstein-Sonderburg-Glücksburg, on 9 October 1653.

== Death ==
He died childless at Celle on 15 March 1665 and was succeeded by his brother George William, who, on this occasion, gave the Calenberg territory to his younger brother John Frederick. Both territories finally merged after George William's death in 1705 to the Electorate of Hanover under John Frederick's nephew George I Louis, Prince of Calenberg. Christian Louis' widow remarried and became Electress of Brandenburg as the second wife of the Great Elector.

== Ancestry ==
Ancestors of Christian Louis, Duke of Brunswick-Lüneburg

8. Ernest I, Duke of Brunswick-Lüneburg
4. William, Duke of Brunswick-Lüneburg
9. Sophia of Mecklenburg-Schwerin
2. George, Duke of Brunswick-Lüneburg
10. Christian III of Denmark
5. Dorothea of Denmark
11. Dorothea of Saxe-Lauenburg
1. Christian Louis, Duke of Brunswick-Lüneburg
12. George I, Landgrave of Hesse-Darmstadt
6. Louis V, Landgrave of Hesse-Darmstadt
13. Magdalene of Lippe
3. Anne Eleonore of Hesse-Darmstadt
14. John George, Elector of Brandenburg
7. Magdalena von Brandenburg
15. Elisabeth of Anhalt-Zerbst

== See also ==
- List of the rulers of Lüneburg

Christian Louis of Brunswick and Lunenburg, Calenberg line House of Hanover Cadet branch of the House of Welf Born: 25 February 1622 in Herzberg am Harz Died: 15 March 1655 in Celle
German nobility
Preceded by George	Duke of Brunswick-Lüneburg, Prince of Calenberg; 1641–1648	Succeeded by George William as Prince of Calenberg
Preceded by Frederick IV	Duke of Brunswick-Lüneburg, Prince of Lüneburg; 1648–1665	Succeeded by George William as Prince of Lunenburg
