= Ernest II of Brunswick-Lüneburg =

Ernest II, Duke of Brunswick-Lüneburg
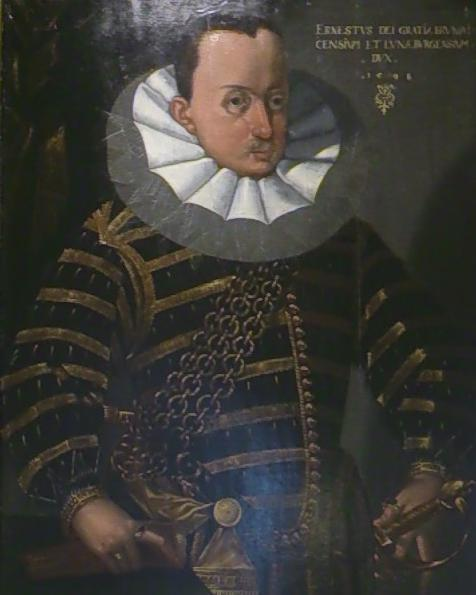
- Born: 31 December 1564
- Died: 2 March 1611 (aged 46)
- House: House of Guelph
- Father: William the Younger of Brunswick-Lüneburg
- Mother: Dorothea of Denmark

Ernest II, Duke of Brunswick-Lüneburg (1564–1611), was the Prince of Lüneburg from 1592 to 1611.

== Life ==
Ernest was born on 31 December 1564 as the second of fifteen children and the eldest son of William the Younger and his consort Dorothea of Denmark. After studying at Wittenberg, Leipzig and Straßburg he returned to Celle as a result of his father's worsening health. In 1592, after the death of his father, he took over the reins of power. Initially he was limited to a rule of 8 years by a treaty with his brother Christian and the nobles. However, following the sealing of subsequent agreement, he was able to exercise power until his death on 2 March 1611. His rule was dominated by attempts to improve the financial situation of both the principality as well as his family, because his father had left the state in serious debt. Also worth mentioning is the Celle Family Treaty concluded by him in 1610, which secured the indivisibility of the principality and which was confirmed by Emperor Matthias in 1612.

== Ancestors ==
Ancestors of Ernest II of Brunswick-Lüneburg

8. Henry I of Lüneburg
4. Ernest I, Duke of Brunswick-Lüneburg
9. Margarete of Saxony
2. William, Duke of Brunswick-Lüneburg
10. Henry V, Duke of Mecklenburg
5. Sophia of Mecklenburg
11. Ursula of Brandenburg
1. Ernest II, Duke of Brunswick-Lüneburg
12. Frederick I of Denmark
6. Christian III of Denmark
13. Anna of Brandenburg
3. Dorothea of Denmark
14. Magnus I, Duke of Saxe-Lauenburg
7. Dorothea of Saxe-Lauenburg
15. Catherine of Brunswick-Wolfenbüttel

== See also ==
- List of the rulers of Lüneburg

== Sources ==
- William Sauer (1877). "Ernst II., Herzog von Braunschweig-Lüneburg" . Allgemeine Deutsche Biographie (in German). Vol. 6. Leipzig: Duncker & Humblot. p. 261.

Ernest II of Brunswick-Lüneburg House of Welf Born: 31 December 1564 Died: 2 March 1611
German nobility
Preceded by William the Younger	Duke of Brunswick-Lüneburg; Prince of Lüneburg; 1592–1611	Succeeded by Christian
