= Klein Hehlen =

- Stadtteil of Celle
- Interactive map of Klein Hehlen
- Location within Germany Location within Lower Saxony
- Coordinates: 52°38′09″N 10°03′23″E
- Country: Germany
- State: Lower Saxony
- District: Celle
- Town: Celle
- Elevation: 42 m (138 ft)

Population (2020-12-31)
  - Total: 6,277
- Time zone: UTC+01:00 (CET)
  - Summer (DST): UTC+02:00 (CEST)
- Postal codes: 29223
- Dialling codes: 05141

The village of Klein Hehlen was incorporated in 1939 by law into the adjacent town of Celle. The suburb is northwest of the town centre.

== Politics ==
The chair of the parish council (Ortsbürgermeister) is Klaus Didschies (CDU).

== Culture and points of interest ==
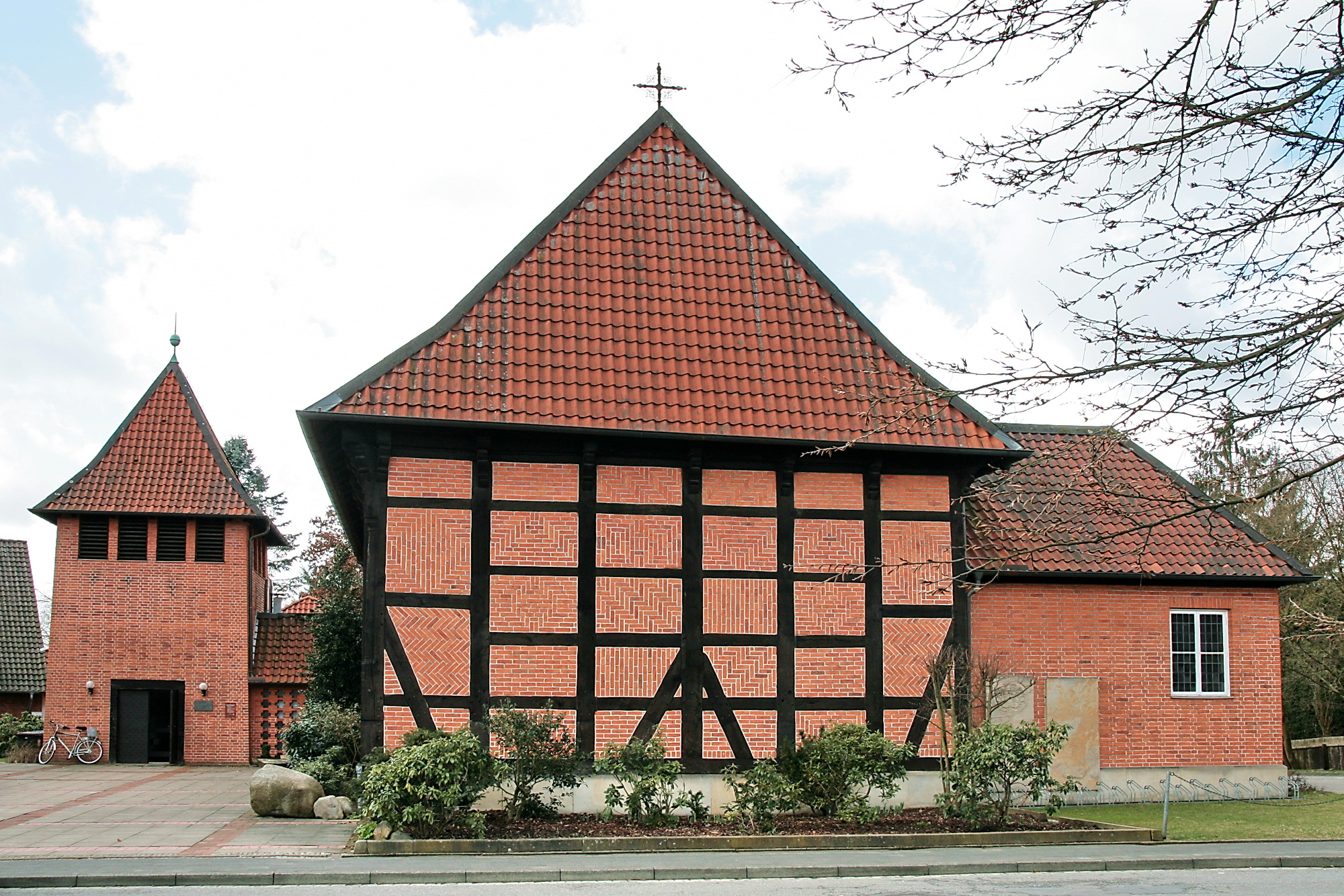
Church of St Boniface (Bonifatiuskirche)

- The Church of St Boniface (Bonifatiuskirche) was built in 1657 as a cemetery chapel on the hill of Harburger Berg. In the meantime, from 1758 to 1902, it was used as a garrison church. 300 years after it was built the timber-framed building was moved in 1957 to its present site. The pulpit, donated by Duke Christian Louis, dates to the year 1659; the altar came from Großburgwedel and dates to 1690.
- The (since reduced) collection of books in the former court library founded in the 16th century by Ernest the Confessor, Duke of Brunswick-Lüneburg, was merged with the 40,000 books in the library of the Celle-Klein Hehlen theological seminary. This public, religious, academic specialist library offers today a collection of 62,000 books, which are accessible free to those who are interested.

== Economy and infrastructure ==
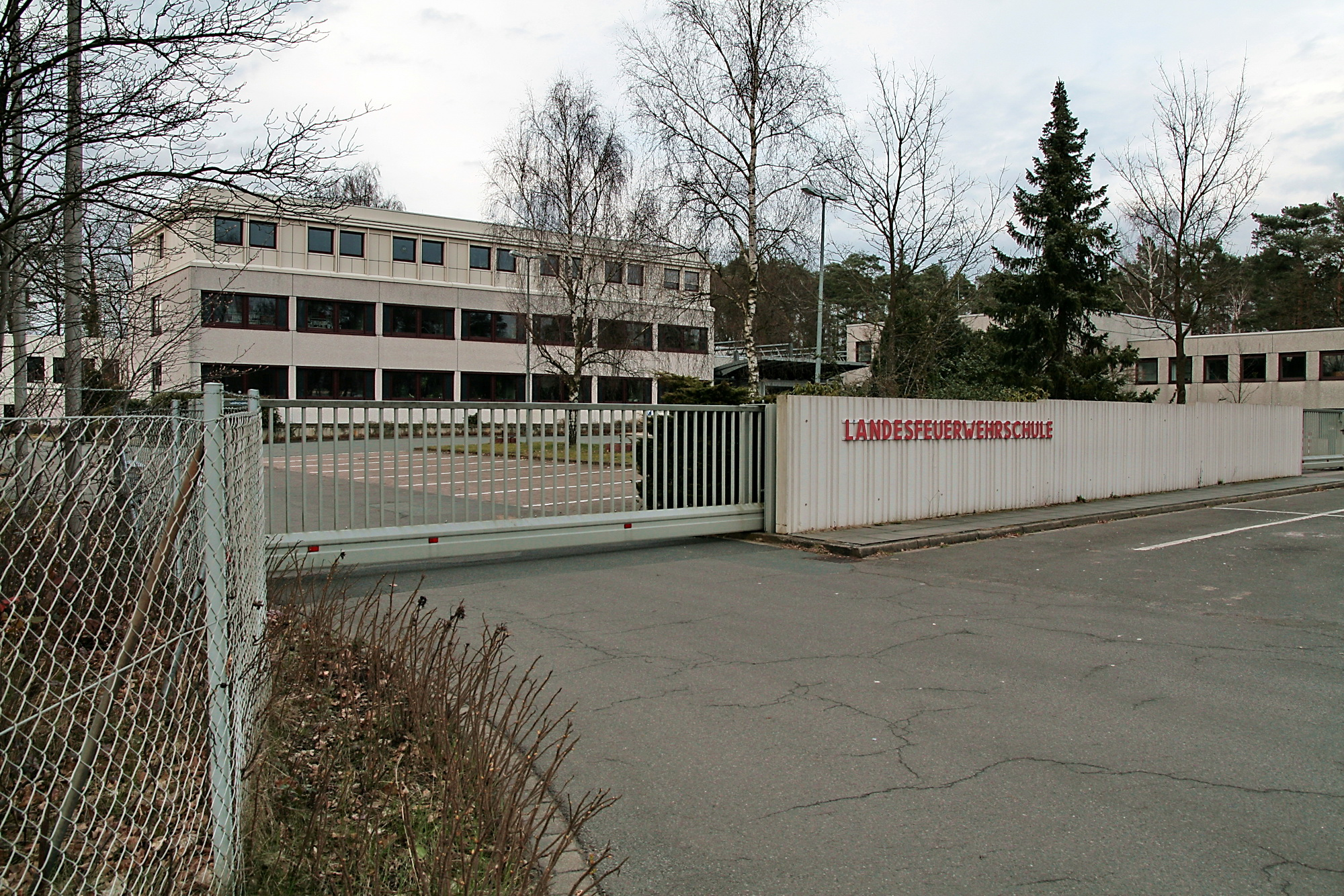
Celle State Firefighting School

- The state firefighting school in Celle was founded in 1931 and is located in Klein Hehlen. The present-day Lower Saxon State Firefighting School (Niedersächsische Landesfeuerwehrschule has a capacity of 160 student places and is a public-law institution with initial and continuation training for members of the volunteer and professional fire services.
- Opposite the firefighting school is the Celle Road Maintenance Office which carries out road inspections and maintenance as well as winter services for the district of Celle.
