= George, Duke of Brunswick =

George
- Duke of Brunswick-Lüneburg
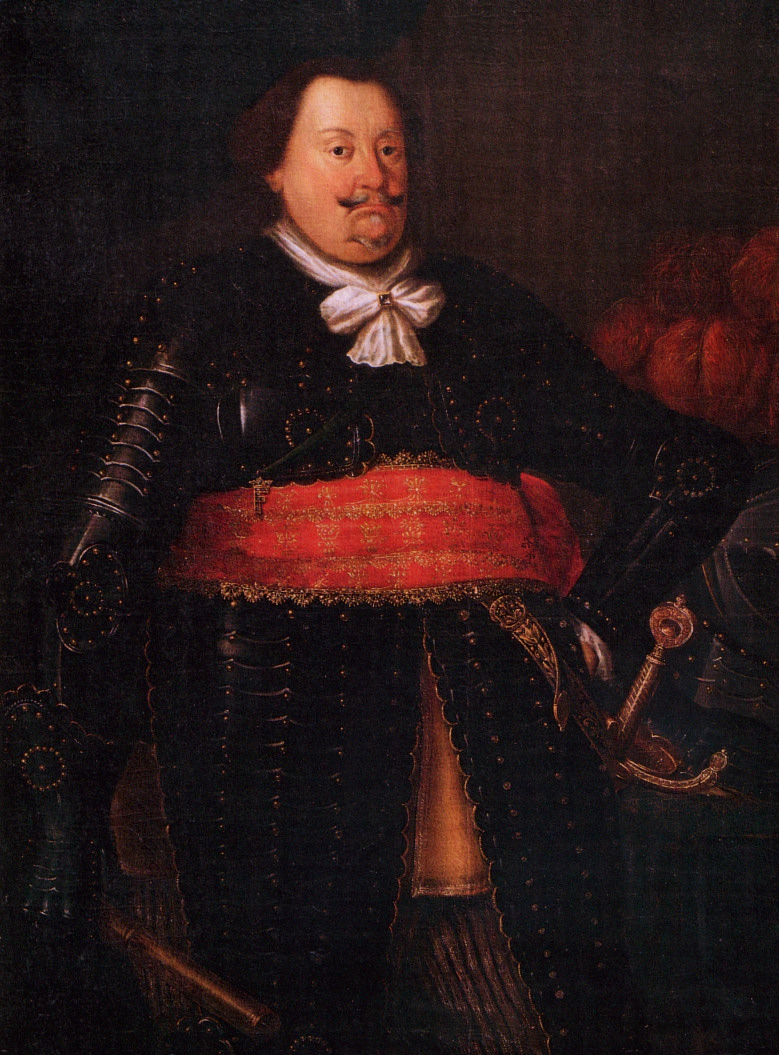
- Georg von Calenberg
- Born: 17 February 1582; Celle
- Died: 12 April 1641 (aged 59); Hildesheim
- Spouse: Anne Eleonore of Hesse-Darmstadt (m. 1617)
- Issue Detail: Christian Louis, Duke of Brunswick-Lüneburg; George William, Duke of Brunswick-Lüneburg; John Frederick, Duke of Brunswick-Lüneburg; Sophie Amalie, Queen of Denmark; Ernest Augustus, Elector of Hanover; Duchess Anna Marie
- House: Welf (birth); Hanover (founder)
- Father: William, Duke of Brunswick-Lüneburg
- Mother: Dorothea of Denmark

George, Duke of Brunswick-Lüneburg (17 February 1582, in Celle (German Georg)– 12 April 1641, in Hildesheim), ruled as Prince of Calenberg from 1635. He was a member of the House of Welf, a prominent German noble family. George was part of a cadet branch of the family known as the Dukes of Brunswick-Lüneburg, which held territories in what is now Lower Saxony in Germany.

George was the sixth son of William, Duke of Brunswick-Lüneburg (1535–1592) and Dorothea of Denmark (1546–1617). His mother was the daughter to King Christian III of Denmark and Dorothea of Saxe-Lauenburg. She acted as a regent during the early years of his reign, keeping power from the Councillors who had mismanaged the estates during his father's fits of insanity.

In the 1635 re-division of the territories of the House of Welf, after the death of Frederick Ulrich, Duke of Brunswick-Lüneburg, he received the Principality of Calenberg, which included the former Principality of Göttingen, since 1495, while his elder brother, Augustus the Elder, retained the Principality of Lüneburg. George was the first duke to move his residence to Hanover, where he built the Leineschloss as his residence in 1636, a palace situated by the river Leine. After his death, he was succeeded by his son, Christian Louis.

== Children ==
George married Anne Eleonore of Hesse-Darmstadt, daughter of Louis V, Landgrave of Hesse-Darmstadt and Magdalene of Brandenburg, in 1617. They had the following known children:

- Christian Louis, Duke of Brunswick-Lüneburg (1622–1665), Prince of Calenberg from 1641-1648, and Prince of Lüneburg from 1648-1665.
- George William, Duke of Brunswick-Lüneburg (1624–1705), Prince of Calenberg from 1648-1665, and Prince of Lüneburg from 1665-1705. He was the father of Sophia Dorothea of Celle, wife of the future King George I of Great Britain.
- John Frederick, Duke of Brunswick-Lüneburg (1625–1679), Prince of Calenberg from 1665-1679.
- Sophie Amalie of Brunswick-Lüneburg (1628–1685), who married King Frederick III of Denmark.
- Ernest Augustus, Elector of Hanover (1629–1698), Prince of Calenberg from 1679-1698, husband of Electress Sophia, and father of King George I of Great Britain.

George, Duke of Brunswick House of Hanover Cadet branch of the House of Welf Born: 17 February 1582 Died: 12 April 1641
Regnal titles
Preceded by Frederick Ulrich	Duke of Brunswick-Lüneburg; Prince of Calenberg; 1635–1641	Succeeded by Christian Louis
