= Christian, Duke of Brunswick-Lüneburg =

Christian the Elder, Duke of Brunswick-Lüneburg
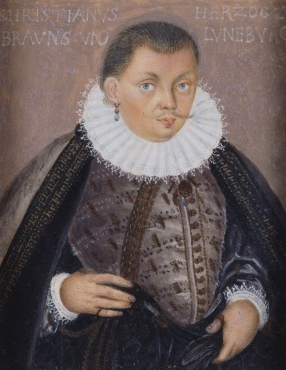
- Born: 9 November 1566
- Died: 8 November 1633 (aged 66)
- House: House of Welf
- Father: William of Brunswick-Lüneburg
- Mother: Dorothea of Denmark

Christian the Elder, Duke of Brunswick-Lüneburg, (1566–1633) was Prince of Lüneburg and Administrator of the Prince-Bishopric of Minden.

== Life ==
Christian was born on 9 November 1566, the second son of Duke William of Brunswick-Lüneburg and Dorothea of Denmark, was elected in 1597 as Coadjutor of the Prince-Bishopric of Minden and took office as the bishop himself in 1599. After the death of his elder brother, Ernest II (1611), he took over the rule of the Principality of Lüneburg and acquired the Principality of Grubenhagen in 1617, which was merged.

When the Thirty Years' War broke out he joined, with Duke Frederick of Holstein, the side of the Emperor, became colonel of the Lower Saxon Circle troops (Kreistruppen) and sought with great skill to keep the scene of the war as far from the bishopric territory as possible; despite that in 1623 the imperial forces under General Tilly occupied the land. When Lower Saxon noblemen then prepared to defend themselves, Christian resigned his post of circle colonel. Not until 1629, when the Edict of Restitution was passed, did he join the Protestant faith.

He died on 8 November 1633.

== Ancestors ==
Ancestors of Christian, Duke of Brunswick-Lüneburg

8. Henry I of Lüneburg
4. Ernest I, Duke of Brunswick-Lüneburg
9. Margarete of Saxony
2. William, Duke of Brunswick-Lüneburg
10. Henry V, Duke of Mecklenburg
5. Sophia of Mecklenburg
11. Ursula of Brandenburg
1. Christian, Duke of Brunswick-Lüneburg
12. Frederick I of Denmark
6. Christian III of Denmark
13. Anna of Brandenburg
3. Dorothea of Denmark
14. Magnus I, Duke of Saxe-Lauenburg
7. Dorothea of Saxe-Lauenburg
15. Catherine of Brunswick-Wolfenbüttel

== Sources ==
- William Sauer (1876). "Christian (Duke von Brunswick-Lüneburg)" . Allgemeine Deutsche Biographie (in German). Vol. 4. Leipzig: Duncker & Humblot. pp. 162–163.
- C.V. Wedgwood, The Thirty Years War (Jonathan Cape, 1938)

Christian, Duke of Brunswick-Lüneburg House of Welf Cadet branch of the House of Este Born: 9 November 1566 Died: 8 November 1633
German nobility
Religious titles
Preceded by Anthony of Schauenburg	Administrator of the Prince-Bishopric of Minden; 1599–1625	Vacant Title next held by Francis of Wartenberg
German nobility
Preceded by Ernest II	Duke of Brunswick-Lüneburg; Prince of Lüneburg; 1611–1633	Succeeded by Augustus
Preceded by Frederick Ulrich	Duke of Brunswick-Lüneburg; Prince of Grubenhagen; 1617	Grubenhagen merged into Lüneburg
