= Anna Eleonore of Hesse-Darmstadt =

Duchess of Brunswick-Lüneburg (1601–1659)

Anne Eleonore of Hesse-Darmstadt
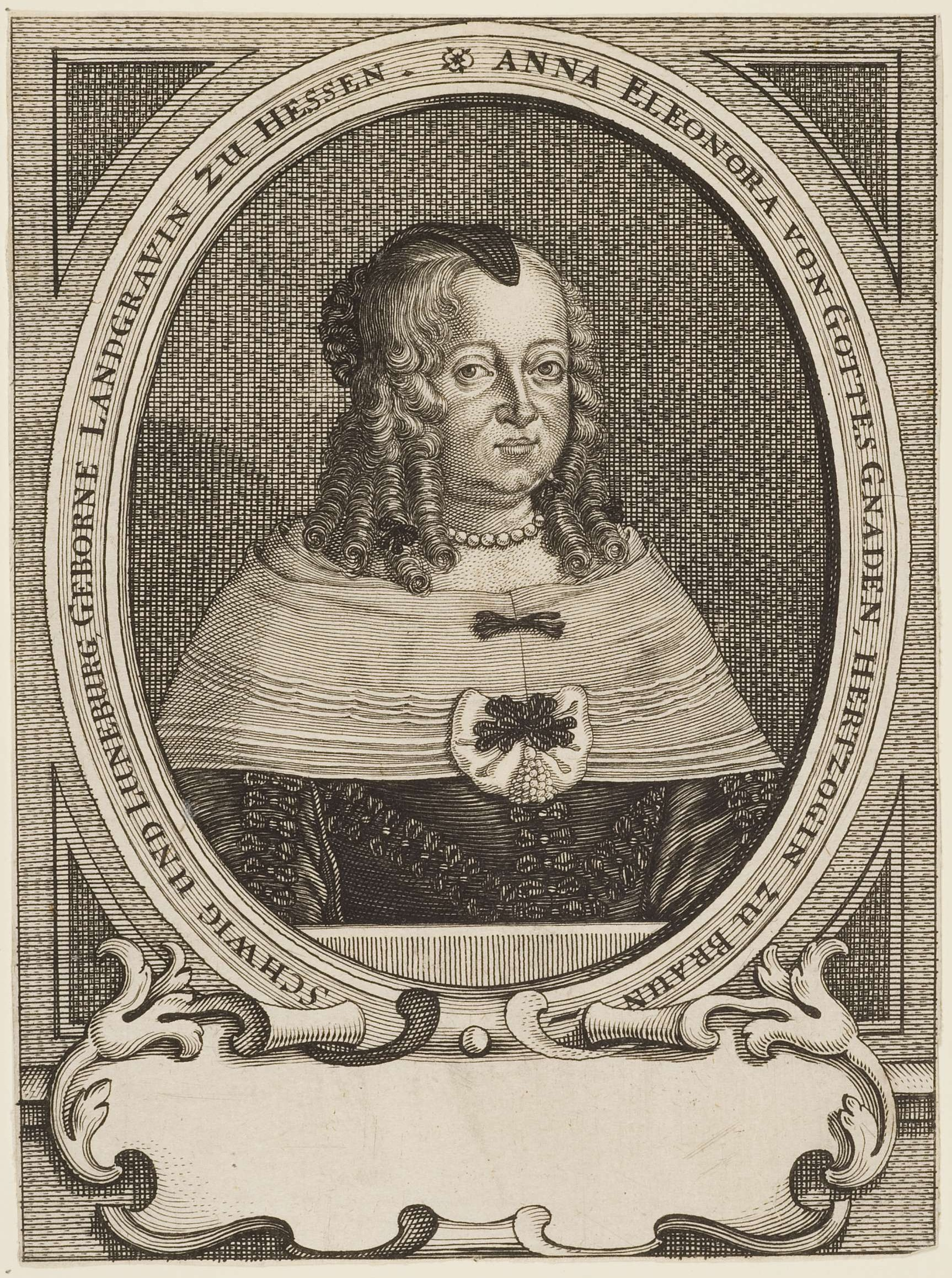
- Anne Eleonore, presumably as a widow
- Born: 30 July 1601; Darmstadt, Hesse, Germany
- Died: 6 May 1659 (aged 57); Herzberg Castle in Lower Saxony, Germany
- Spouse: George, Duke of Brunswick-Lüneburg (m. 1617; died 1641)
- Issue: Christian Louis, Duke of Brunswick-Lüneburg; George William, Duke of Brunswick-Lüneburg; John Frederick, Duke of Brunswick-Lüneburg; Sophie Amalie, Queen of Denmark; Duchess Dorothea Magdalene; Ernest Augustus, Elector of Hanover; Duchess Anna Marie
- House: Hesse-Darmstadt
- Father: Louis V, Landgrave of Hesse-Darmstadt
- Mother: Magdalena von Brandenburg

Princess Anne Eleonore of Hesse-Darmstadt (30 July 1601 – 6 May 1659) was the daughter of Louis V, Landgrave of Hesse-Darmstadt, and Magdalena von Brandenburg. She was born in Darmstadt, Hesse, Germany.

== Marriage ==
She married George, Duke of Brunswick-Lüneburg on 14 December 1617 in Darmstadt. One of their sons was Ernest Augustus, Elector of Brunswick-Lüneburg (1629–1698), father of George I of Great Britain.

== Death ==
She died at Herzberg Castle in Lower Saxony, Germany, on 6 May 1659 at the age of 57.

== Issue ==
- Magdalene (b. & d. 9 August 1620)
- Christian Ludwig (1622–1665), Prince of Calenberg 1641–1648, Prince of Lüneburg 1648-1665
- Georg Wilhelm (1624–1705), Prince of Calenberg 1648–1665, Prince of Lüneburg 1665-1705
- Johann Friedrich (1625–1679), Prince of Calenberg 1665-1679
- Sophie Amalie (1628–1685), married King Frederick III of Denmark
- Dorothea Magdalene (1629-17 November 1630)
- Ernst Augustus (1629–1698), Prince of Calenberg 1679–1698, father of King George I of Great Britain
- Anna Marie Eleonore (20 November 1630 – 13 November 1636)
