= Frederick IV of Brunswick-Lüneburg =

Duke of Brunswick-Lüneburg (1574–1648)

Frederick IV, Duke of Brunswick-Lüneburg
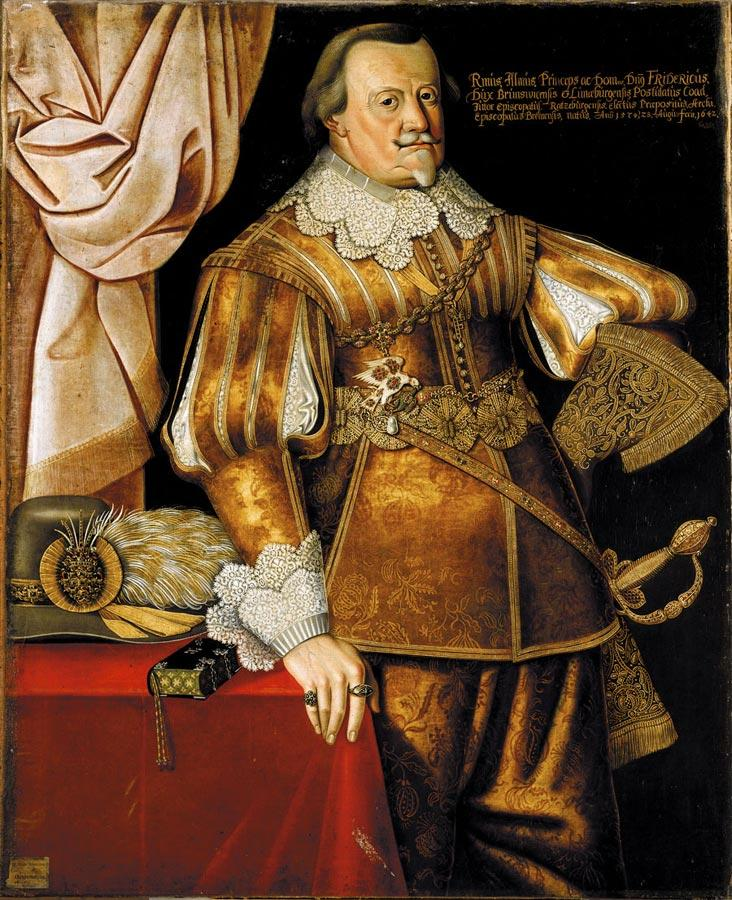
- Born: 28 August 1574
- Died: 10 December 1648 (aged 74)
- House: House of Welf
- Father: William, Duke of Brunswick-Lüneburg
- Mother: Dorothea of Denmark

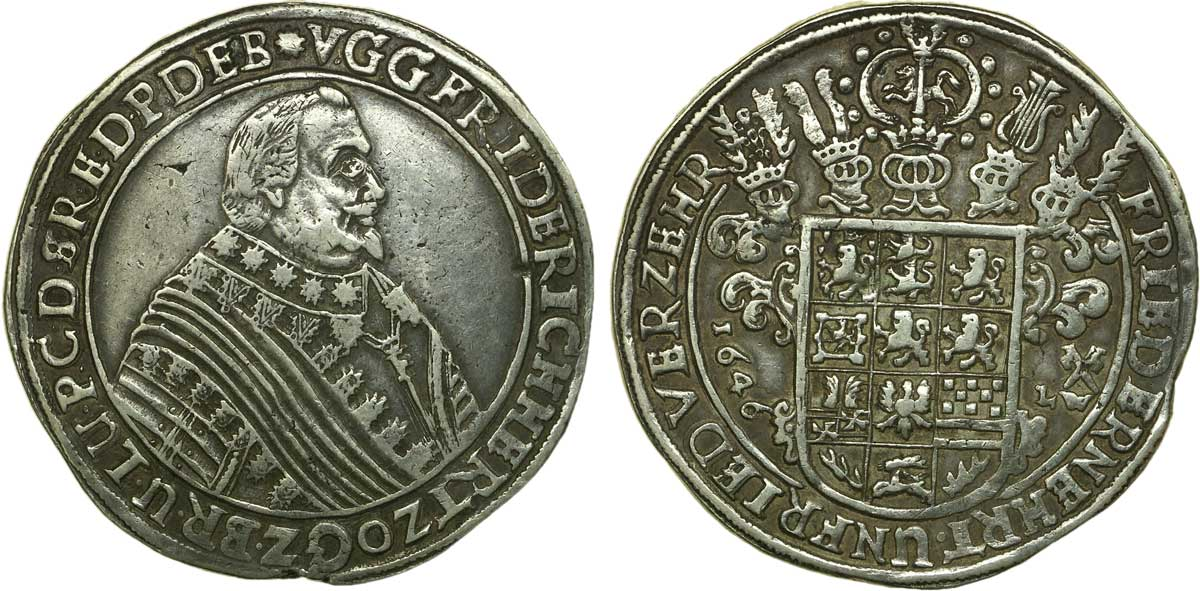
Thaler of Frederick IV, Duke of Brunswick-Lüneburg

Frederick, Duke of Brunswick and Lüneburg, (28 August 1574 – 10 December 1648) was the Prince of Lüneburg from 1636 to 1648.

Frederick was born on 28 August 1574, the tenth child of William the Younger (Brunswick-Lüneburg) (1535–1592) and Dorothea of Denmark to the New House of Lüneburg.

He became bishop's adjutor in the Bishopric of Ratzeburg and was elected propst (provost) of the Archdiocese of Bremen.

== Ancestors ==
Ancestors of Frederick IV of Brunswick-Lüneburg

8. Henry I of Lüneburg
4. Ernest I, Duke of Brunswick-Lüneburg
9. Margarete of Saxony
2. William, Duke of Brunswick-Lüneburg
10. Henry V, Duke of Mecklenburg
5. Sophia of Mecklenburg
11. Ursula of Brandenburg
1. Frederick IV, Duke of Brunswick-Lüneburg
12. Frederick I of Denmark
6. Christian III of Denmark
13. Anna of Brandenburg
3. Dorothea of Denmark
14. Magnus I, Duke of Saxe-Lauenburg
7. Dorothea of Saxe-Lauenburg
15. Catherine of Brunswick-Wolfenbüttel

== Sources ==
- Siebern, Heinrich: Die Kunstdenkmäler der Provinz Hannover. III. Regierungsbezirk Lüneburg, Heft 5, Stadt Celle. Hanover, 1937.

Frederick of Brunswick and Lunenburg, Lunenburg (/Celle) line House of Welf Cadet branch of the House of Este Born: 28 August 1574 in Celle Died: 10 December 1648 in Celle
German nobility
Preceded by Augustus I as Prince of Lunenburg	Duke of Brunswick-Lüneburg; Prince of Lüneburg as Frederick IV; 1636–1648	Succeeded by Christian Louis as Prince of Lunenburg
Preceded by William Augustus as Lord of Harburg	Duke of Brunswick-Lüneburg; Prince of Lüneburg as Frederick IV; 1636–1648	Succeeded by Christian Louis as Prince of Lunenburg
