= Augustus the Elder, Duke of Brunswick-Lüneburg =

Augustus the Elder
- Duke of Brunswick-Lüneburg
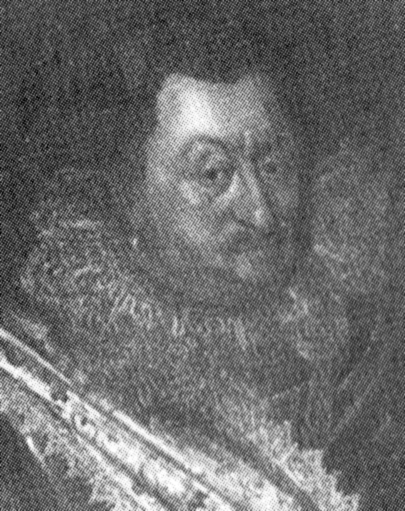
- Born: 18 November 1568
- Died: 1 October 1636 (aged 67); Celle
- Spouse: Ilse Schmidtchen (cr. Frau von Lüneburg)
- Issue: Eva Margaretha, Frierich, and 10 others
- House: House of Welf
- Father: William the Younger, Duke of Brunswick-Lüneburg
- Mother: Dorothea of Denmark

Augustus the Elder, Duke of Brunswick-Lüneburg (18 November 1568 – 1 October 1636) was the Lutheran Bishop of Ratzeburg from 1610 to 1636 and the Prince of Lüneburg from 1633 to 1636.

== Life ==
Augustus was born in 1564 as the fifth of fifteen children and the son of William the Younger and his wife Dorothea of Denmark. As a young man he was a colonel in the service of Rudolf II and fought in the campaigns against France and Turkey. In 1610 Augustus became the Lutheran administrator of the Prince-Bishopric of Ratzeburg.

In order to prevent hereditary aspirations the Ratzeburg cathedral chapter, the elective body, insisted that on ascending to power in the prince-bishopric (an elective monarchy), Augustus committed himself in his election capitulation not to marry. Nevertheless he lived with Ilse Schmidtchen, a commoner, in a 'marriage-like relationship' and had 12 children by her; he built her a house near his residence, Celle Castle. The children were later elevated to the hereditary peerage under the name von Lüneburg; this surname still exists.

In 1633 Augustus succeeded his brother, Christian, who had died, as Prince of Lüneburg. During the Thirty Years War he continued the policy of neutrality started by his brother. He died in Celle in 1636.

Since 1831, the family descended from Augustus has resided at Essenrode Manor. The last male heir (who died in 1961) of this von Lüneburg morganatic line adopted his great-nephew, Baron Ernst Bussche, heir of Essenrode Manor, who took on the name von Lüneburg.

== Ancestors ==
Ancestors of Augustus the Elder, Duke of Brunswick-Lüneburg

8. Henry I of Lüneburg
4. Ernest I, Duke of Brunswick-Lüneburg
9. Margarete of Saxony
2. William, Duke of Brunswick-Lüneburg
10. Henry V, Duke of Mecklenburg
5. Sophia of Mecklenburg
11. Ursula of Brandenburg
1. Augustus I, Duke of Brunswick-Lüneburg
12. Frederick I of Denmark
6. Christian III of Denmark
13. Anna of Brandenburg
3. Dorothea of Denmark
14. Magnus I, Duke of Saxe-Lauenburg
7. Dorothea of Saxe-Lauenburg
15. Catherine of Brunswick-Wolfenbüttel

== See also ==
- House of Welf

== Sources ==
- Geckler, Christa (1986). Die Celler Herzöge: Leben und Wirken 1371–1705. Celle: Georg Ströher. ISBN 3-921744-05-8. OCLC 255990175.

Augustus the Elder, Duke of Brunswick-Lüneburg House of Welf Cadet branch of the House of Este Born: 1568 Died: 1636
German nobility
Religious titles
Preceded by Charles	Administrator of the Prince-Bishopric of Ratzeburg; 1610–1636	Succeeded by Gustavus Adolphus of Mecklenburg
German nobility
Preceded by Christian	Duke of Brunswick-Lüneburg; Prince of Lüneburg; 1633–1636	Succeeded by Frederick IV
