= Francis Otto, Duke of Brunswick-Lüneburg =

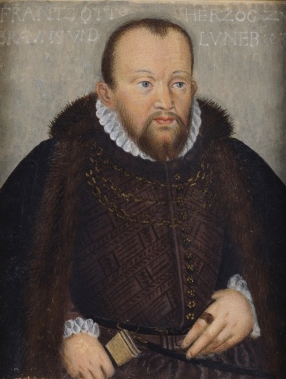
Francis Otto

Francis Otto, Duke of Brunswick-Lüneburg (20 June 1530 Lüneburg, Braunschweig-Lüneburg – 29 April 1559) was the Prince of Lüneburg from 1555 to 1559. He was the son of Ernest I, Duke of Brunswick-Lüneburg.

== Life ==
When Francis Otto took over the reins of power in 1555, he had to promise the interim government, that had ruled since the death of his father in 1546, that he would comply with a large number of constraints. His reign was dominated above all by the debts incurred by the principality. In 1559 he married Elizabeth Magdalene of Brandenburg, daughter of Joachim II Hector of Brandenburg and Hedwig of Poland, but he died in the same year of smallpox. The marriage was childless.

== Sources ==
- Geckler, Christa (1986). Die Celler Herzöge: Leben und Wirken 1371–1705. Celle: Georg Ströher. ISBN 3-921744-05-8. OCLC 255990175.
- Nowakowska, Natalia, ed. (2019). Remembering the Jagiellonians. Routledge. ISBN 978-1-138-56239-4.
- Ward, A.W.; Prothero, G.W.; Leathes, Stanley, eds. (1934). The Cambridge Modern History. Vol. XIII. Cambridge at the University Press.

Francis Otto, Duke of Brunswick-Lüneburg House of Welf Born: 20 June 1530 Died: 29 April 1559
German nobility
Preceded by Ernest the Confessor	Duke of Brunswick-Lüneburg; Prince of Lüneburg; 1555–1559	Succeeded by William the Younger; Henry
