= Dorothea of Denmark, Duchess of Brunswick =

Duchess of Brunswick-Lüneburg

Dorothea of Denmark
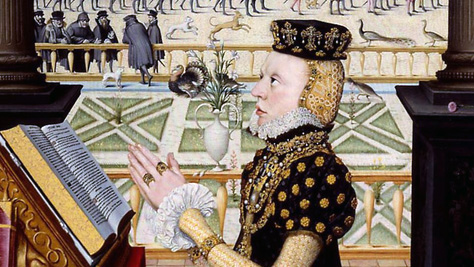
- Detail from altarpiece attributed to Ludger Tom Ring the Younger in the chapel of Celle Castle, c. 1569
- Born: 29 June 1546; Kolding
- Died: 6 January 1617 (aged 70); Winsen
- Spouse: William, Duke of Brunswick-Lüneburg (m. 1561; died 1592)
- Issue: Sophia, Margravine of Brandenburg-Ansbach; Ernest II, Duke of Brunswick-Lüneburg; Elisabeth, Countess of Hohenlohe-Langenburg; Christian, Duke of Brunswick-Lüneburg; Augustus I, Duke of Brunswick-Lüneburg; Dorothea, Countess Palatine of Zweibrücken-Birkenfeld; Clara, Countess of Schwarzburg-Frankenhausen; Anne Ursula of Brunswick-Lüneburg; Margaret, Duchess of Saxe-Coburg; Frederick IV, Duke of Brunswick-Lüneburg; Marie of Brunswick-Lüneburg; Magnus of Brunswick-Lüneburg; George, Duke of Brunswick-Lüneburg; John of Brunswick-Lüneburg; Sybille, Duchess of Brunswick-Lüneburg
- House: Oldenburg
- Father: Christian III of Denmark
- Mother: Dorothea of Saxe-Lauenburg

Princess Dorothea of Denmark (29 June 1546 – 6 January 1617) was the Duchess of Brunswick-Lüneburg from 1561 until 1592 as the consort of Duke William the Younger. She was regent for her son George from 1592 to 1596.

== Biography ==
Born in Kolding, Dorothea was the youngest child of Christian III of Denmark-Norway and Dorothea of Saxe-Lauenburg. She married William, Duke of Brunswick-Lüneburg on 12 October 1561.

When her husband died in 1592, she became regent for her under age son George. She had a deep mistrust of the councillors because of their ill management of her husband's estates during his insanity. Dorothea was known as a capable and energetic regent.

She died in Winsen, Germany at the age of 70.

== Children who reached adulthood ==
- Sophia (30 October 1563 – 1639), married George Frederick, Margrave of Brandenburg-Ansbach
- Ernst (31 December 1564 – 2 March 1611)
- Elisabeth (19 October 1565 – 17 July 1621), married Frederick, Count of Hohenlohe-Langenburg
- Christian (19 November 1566 – 8 November 1633)
- Augustus (18 November 1568 – 1 October 1636)
- Dorothea (1 January 1570 – 15 August 1649), married Charles, Count Palatine of Birkenfeld
- Clara (16 January 1571 – 18 July 1658), married William, Count of Schwarzburg-Blankenburg
- Anne (22 March 1572 – 5 February 1601)
- Margaret (6 April 1573 – 7 August 1643), married Johann Casimir, Duke of Saxe-Coburg
- Friedrich (28 August 1574 – 10 December 1648)
- Marie (21 October 1575 – 8 August 1610)
- Magnus (30 August 1577 – 10 February 1632)
- Georg (17 February 1582 – 12 April 1641)
- Johann (23 June 1583 – 27 November 1628)
- Sybille (3 June 1584 – 5 August 1652), married Julius Ernest, Duke of Brunswick-Lüneburg

== Ancestry ==
Ancestors of Dorothea of Denmark, Duchess of Brunswick

8. Christian I of Denmark
4. Frederick I of Denmark
9. Dorothea of Brandenburg
2. Christian III of Denmark
10. John Cicero, Elector of Brandenburg
5. Anna of Brandenburg
11. Margaret of Thuringia
1. Dorothea of Denmark
12. John V, Duke of Saxe-Lauenburg
6. Magnus I, Duke of Saxe-Lauenburg
13. Dorothea of Brandenburg
3. Dorothea of Saxe-Lauenburg
14. Henry IV, Duke of Brunswick-Lüneburg
7. Catherine of Brunswick-Wolfenbüttel
15. Catherine of Pomerania-Wolgast

Dorothea of Denmark, Duchess of Brunswick House of Oldenburg Born: 29 June 1546 Died: 6 January 1617
German nobility
Preceded by Sophia of Mecklenburg-Schwerin	Duchess consort of Brunswick-Lüneburg; 1561–1592	Vacant Title next held by Sophia Dorothea of Schleswig-Holstein-Sonderburg-Glücksburg
