= William the Younger, Duke of Brunswick =

16th-century Duke of Brunswick-Lüneburg

William
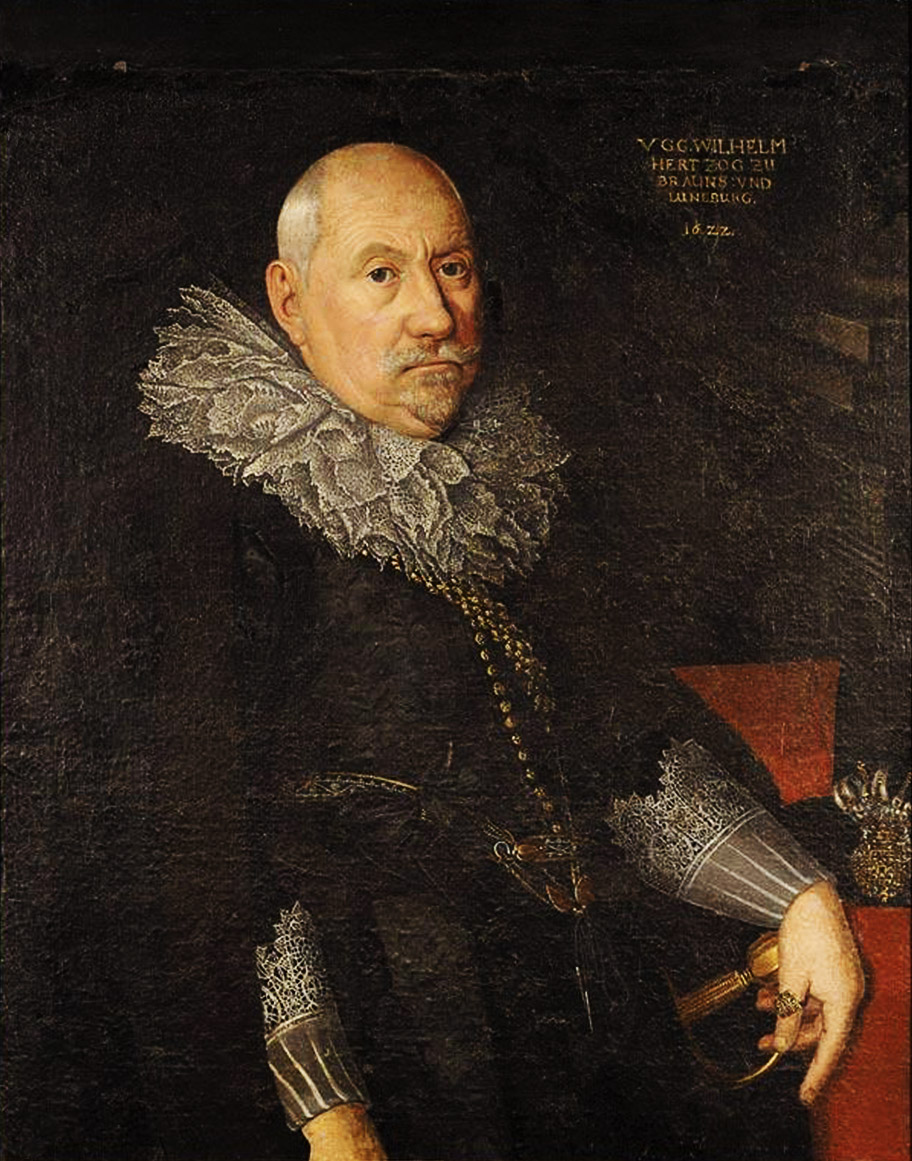
- 1622 portrait

Duke of Brunswick-Lüneburg Prince of Lüneburg
- Reign: 1559 – 20 August 1592
- Predecessor: Ernest I
- Successor: Ernest II
- Born: 4 July 1535
- Died: 20 August 1592 (aged 57)
- Spouse: Dorothea of Denmark (m. 1561)
- Issue: Sophia, Margravine of Brandenburg-Ansbach; Ernest II, Duke of Brunswick-Lüneburg; Elisabeth, Countess of Hohenlohe-Langenburg; Christian, Duke of Brunswick-Lüneburg; Augustus I, Duke of Brunswick-Lüneburg; Dorothea, Countess Palatine of Zweibrücken-Birkenfeld; Clara, Countess of Schwarzburg-Frankenhausen; Anne Ursula of Brunswick-Lüneburg; Margaret, Duchess of Saxe-Coburg; Frederick IV, Duke of Brunswick-Lüneburg; Marie of Brunswick-Lüneburg; Magnus of Brunswick-Lüneburg; George, Duke of Brunswick-Lüneburg; John of Brunswick-Lüneburg; Sybille, Duchess of Brunswick-Lüneburg
- House: Welf
- Father: Ernest I, Duke of Brunswick-Lüneburg
- Mother: Sophia of Mecklenburg-Schwerin

William (4 July 1535 – 20 August 1592), called William the Younger (German: Wilhelm der Jüngere), was Duke of Brunswick-Lüneburg and Prince of Lüneburg from 1559 until his death. Until 1569, he ruled together with his brother, Henry of Dannenberg.

== Biography ==
Born into the House of Welf, ruling family of the Principality of Brunswick-Lüneburg, William was the third son of Ernest I, Duke of Brunswick-Lüneburg and his wife, Duchess Sophia of Mecklenburg-Schwerin.

In 1582, William began suffering from fits of insanity. These fits caused his wife Dorothea to flee him in 1584 for her own safety.

== Marriage and issue ==
On 12 October 1561 he married Princess Dorothea of Denmark, the youngest daughter of Christian III of Denmark and his wife, Dorothea of Saxe-Lauenburg.

William and Dorothea had:

- Sophie of Brunswick-Lüneburg (30 October 1563 – 1639); married George Frederick, Margrave of Brandenburg-Ansbach.
- Ernest II, Duke of Brunswick-Lüneburg (31 December 1564 – 2 March 1611) Prince of Lüneburg from 1592 to 1611.
- Elisabeth of Brunswick-Lüneburg (19 October 1565 – 17 July 1621); married Frederick, Count of Hohenlohe-Langenburg.
- Christian, Duke of Brunswick-Lüneburg (19 November 1566 – 8 November 1633) Prince of Lüneburg from 1611 to 1633.
- Augustus the Elder, Duke of Brunswick-Lüneburg (18 November 1568 – 1 October 1636) Prince of Lüneburg from 1633 to 1636.
- Dorothea of Brunswick-Lüneburg (1 January 1570 – 15 August 1649); married Charles I, Count Palatine of Zweibrücken-Birkenfeld.
- Clara of Brunswick-Lüneburg (16 January 1571 – 18 July 1658); married William, Count of Schwarzburg-Blankenburg.
- Anne Ursula of Brunswick-Lüneburg (22 March 1572 – 5 February 1601)
- Margaret of Brunswick-Lüneburg (6 April 1573 – 7 August 1643); married John Casimir, Duke of Saxe-Coburg.
- Frederick IV, Duke of Brunswick-Lüneburg (28 August 1574 – 10 December 1648) Prince of Lüneburg from 1636 to 1648.
- Marie of Brunswick-Lüneburg (21 October 1575 – 8 August 1610)
- Magnus of Brunswick-Lüneburg (30 August 1577 – 10 February 1632)
- George, Duke of Brunswick-Lüneburg (17 February 1582 – 12 April 1641) Prince of Calenberg 1635–1641
- John of Brunswick-Lüneburg (23 June 1583 – 27 November 1628)
- Sybille of Brunswick-Lüneburg (3 June 1584 – 5 August 1652); married Julius Ernest, Duke of Brunswick-Lüneburg.

== Death ==
William died on 20 August 1592, aged 57. He is interred, along with his wife, in the St. Marien Church in Celle, Lower Saxony, Germany.

After his death, his wife, Duchess Dorothea became regent for their underaged son, George, Duke of Brunswick-Lüneburg.

== Ancestry ==
Ancestors of William the Younger, Duke of Brunswick

8. Otto V, Duke of Brunswick-Lüneburg
4. Henry I of Lüneburg
9. Anne of Nassau-Siegen
2. Ernest I, Duke of Brunswick-Lüneburg
10. Ernest, Elector of Saxony
5. Margarete of Saxony
11. Elisabeth of Bavaria
1.William the Younger, Duke of Brunswick-Lüneburg
12. Magnus II, Duke of Mecklenburg
6. Henry V, Duke of Mecklenburg
13. Sophia of Pomerania
3. Sophia of Mecklenburg
14. John Cicero, Elector of Brandenburg
7. Ursula of Brandenburg
15. Margaret of Thuringia

== Sources ==
- Pastrnak, Patrik (2023). Dynasty in Motion: Wedding Journeys in Late Medieval and Early Modern Europe. Routledge.
- Ward, A.W.; Prothero, G.W.; Leathes, Stanley, eds. (1934). The Cambridge Modern History. Vol. XIII. Cambridge at the University Press.

William the Younger, Duke of Brunswick House of Welf Born: 4 July 1535 Died: 20 August 1592
German nobility
Preceded by Ernest I	Duke of Brunswick-Lüneburg; Prince of Lüneburg; 1559–1592	Succeeded by Ernest II
