= Dorothea of Saxe-Lauenburg =

Queen of Denmark from 1534 to 1559

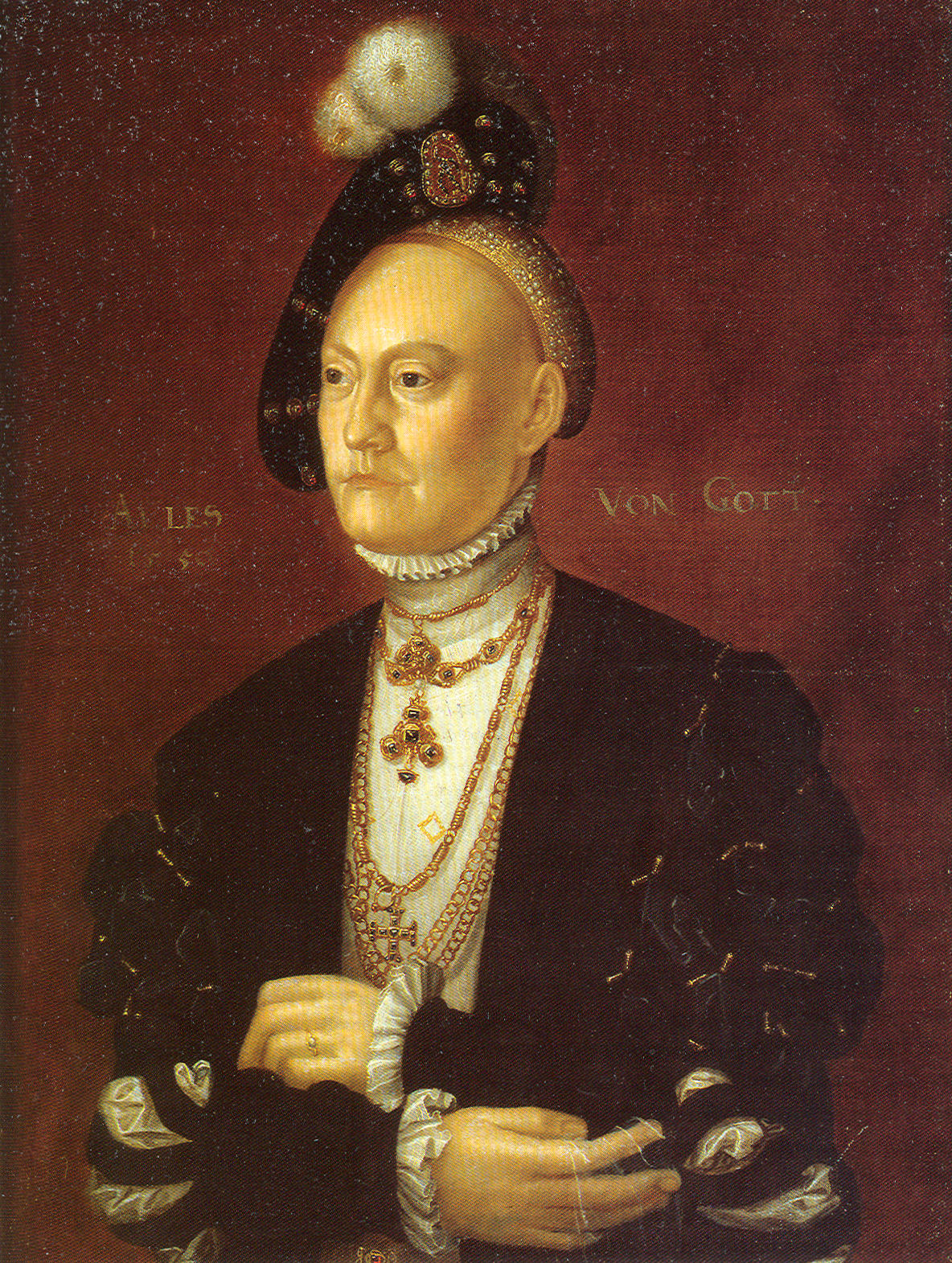
- Portrait by Jakob Binck, c. 1545

Queen consort of Denmark
- Tenure: 4 July 1534 – 1 January 1559
- Coronation: 12 August 1537; Copenhagen Cathedral

Queen consort of Norway
- Tenure: 1537–1559
- Born: 9 July 1511; Lauenburg Castle, Saxe-Lauenburg, Holy Roman Empire
- Died: 7 October 1571 (aged 60); Sønderborg Castle, Sønderborg, Denmark
- Burial: Roskilde Cathedral, Zealand, Denmark
- Spouses: Christian III of Denmark (m. 1525; died 1559)
- Issue: Anne, Electress of Saxony; Frederick II, King of Denmark and Norway; Magnus, King of Livonia; John II, Duke of Schleswig-Holstein-Sonderburg; Dorothea, Duchess of Brunswick-Lüneburg
- House: House of Ascania
- Father: Magnus I, Duke of Saxe-Lauenburg
- Mother: Catherine of Brunswick-Wolfenbüttel

Dorothea of Saxe-Lauenburg (9 July 1511 – 7 October 1571) was queen consort of Denmark and Norway by marriage to King Christian III of Denmark. She was known to having wielded influence upon the affairs of state in Denmark.

== Life ==
She was the daughter of Magnus I, Duke of Saxe-Lauenburg and Catherine of Brunswick-Wolfenbüttel, and sister of Catherine of Saxe-Lauenburg, the first queen of King Gustav I of Sweden.

Dorothea was raised in one of the first states in Germany where the reformation was proclaimed, and was affected from Lutheranism early in life. She was married to Christian on 29 October 1525 at Lauenburg Castle. They lived at their own courts in Haderslev and Törning.

=== Queen ===
She formally became queen of Denmark in 1533, but due to the Civil War (Count's Feud) that immediately followed her husband's accession to the throne, her coronation did not take place until 1537. On 6 August 1536, queen Dorothea finally made her official entry to the capital of Copenhagen with the king, and on 12 August 1537, she rode on a snow white horse by the side of her husband to their coronation, and made a favorable impression with her beauty and dignified appearance. In 1537 she also became queen of Norway, after her husband did a Coup d'état, and became king of Norway.

Queen Dorothea's relationship to the king is described as a happy one, and the king evidently trusted her and allowed her a great deal of influence. She was repeatedly pointed out by contemporaries to have been politically active and to have participated in state affairs, but these comments are only general statements and do not describe exactly how and within which issues she took an interest and used her influence. Shortly after her husband's succession to the thrones of Denmark and Norway, the king, supported by his German advisers, supported the plans to have Dorothea appointed future regent of Denmark–Norway should her son succeeded to the throne while still a minor; these plans were, however, resisted by the Danish council and particularly Johan Friis, whom the queen reportedly came to resent because of it. Neither was she allowed to take a formal seat in the council. Her influence, therefore, continued to be informal, and she is thought to have participated in appointing and dismissing officials.

Dorothea reportedly learned to speak Danish, and is known to have a German confessor and always to have written her letters in German. She was described as beautiful, with a great posture and an impulsive, passionate mind with a strong will force; she enjoyed hunting, "as she was an excellent rider", and as late as 1555 was noted to have participated in a hunt with such energy that she fell off her horse. As the first lady of the royal household, queen Dorothea hosted festivities with great splendor when motivated as representation of royal power, but was in everyday life described as strict, moral and frugal; she supervised the finances of the household herself, allowed for no waste and had all members of the court in constant occupation, allowing her ladies-in-waiting no time for leisure.

Dorothea is described as a dominating mother who kept strict control over her children also after they became adults, and her acts as a guardian to them were described as strict and intense. As was the custom of the time, she also had several children of the nobility as her foster children, who were raised in her household as her courtiers and maids-of-honor, over whom she also kept a strict control. In 1540, Birgitte Gøye was freed from her engagement with her assistance, which led to a law banning arranged engagements of minors. Her daughters were raised in household chores and to marry, while her sons were given a strict schooling and not allowed to stray from their studies much prior to their adulthood. In 1548, she accompanied her daughter Anna to her wedding in Saxony, and she kept visiting her daughters in Germany regularly once a year for the rest of her life.

She was widowed in 1559.

=== Queen Dowager ===
As a queen dowager, she resided with her own court in Koldinghus.

Queen dowager Dorothea fell in love with her brother-in-law and neighbor, Duke John II of Schleswig-Holstein-Haderslev (1521–1580), during her marriage, and despite her intense grief at the deathbed of her spouse, she issued negotiations to marry her former brother-in-law shortly after her husband's death in 1559. Her intended marriage, however, was opposed by various theologians who considered it impossible for a widow to marry her late husband's brother and was eventually prevented, despite several years efforts from Dorothea's part to bring it about. This caused the breakdown of her relationship with her son, King Frederick, with whom she had never been particularly close. In parallel, Dorothea successfully opposed her son the king's desired marriage with her maid of honor Anne Hardenberg, a matter which was also drawn out for years.

The relationship between queen dowager Dorothea and her reigning son king Frederick II was tense. Frederick was given his own court at the age of twenty, and Dorothea often used her authority as his mother to reprimand him for his lifestyle of "drinking and other indecencies", and this state of affairs did not change after Frederick became king. She favored her younger sons, particularly Magnus, to the point that he had difficulties handling his responsibilities on his own, and protected her younger children from her eldest son the king and what she regarded as his bad influence. Her less favorable view upon her eldest son may also have affected by the fact that he did not attend his fathers deathbed, despite the fact that his mother repeatedly called upon him during his father's illness to do so.

Dorothea considered it her God given right and duty as a mother not only to love but to advise and rule over her children, including her son the king, and once wrote:

"It does not become a faithful mother to be silent about what could bring the ruin to her children, or to flatter, rather God has earnestly commanded not to spare the lash."

However, Frederick II detested both her reprimands and her attempts to involve in state affairs as she had done during his father's reign.

The tense relationship between Dorothea and Frederick II finally resulted in a break during the Nordic Seven Years War (1562–1570). Dorothea intensely disliked the war and repeatedly offered herself as a mediator to put an end to it. Her son Frederick II greatly disliked her interference and warned her to stay out of state affairs in no uncertain terms, upon which she replied: "We can, God be praised, do without this long journey to Sweden and now have a good day with a clear conscience [...] You may be convinced, that we have no intention to trouble ourselves in this matter, when we can understand from your letter that you now better" - but she resumed her efforts to act as a mediator the following year. Dorothea issued separate contact with Sweden, and in 1567, Frederick II discovered that his mother had conducted secret negotiations to arranged a marriage between his brother Magnus and Princess Sophia of Sweden in an effort to establish peace, without his knowledge and during ongoing warfare. She defended herself by saying that she had only intended to benefit Denmark, but the king suspected her for treason and had her informally exiled to Sønderborg Castle, where she resided the remainder of her life. Frederick II also had a ship she sent to Magnus with supplies seized under suspicion that it was heading for Sweden.

Queen Dorothea is interred next to her husband in Roskilde Cathedral near Copenhagen.

== Children ==
Dorothea had five children:

- Anne of Denmark (1532–1585). Consort to Augustus, Elector of Saxony
- Frederick II (1534–1588).
- Magnus, King of Livonia (1540–1583).
- Johann II, Duke of Schleswig-Holstein-Sonderburg-Plön (1545–1622).
- Dorothea of Denmark (1546–1617). Consort to William, Duke of Brunswick-Lüneburg and mother of George, Duke of Brunswick-Lüneburg.

== Ancestry ==
Ancestors of Dorothea of Saxe-Lauenburg

8. Bernard II, Duke of Saxe-Lauenburg
4. John V, Duke of Saxe-Lauenburg
9. Adelheid of Pomerania-Stolp
2. Magnus I, Duke of Saxe-Lauenburg
10. Frederick II, Elector of Brandenburg
5. Dorothea of Brandenburg
11. Catherine of Saxony
1. Dorothea of Saxe-Lauenburg
12. William IV, Duke of Brunswick-Lüneburg
6. Henry IV, Duke of Brunswick-Lüneburg
13. Elisabeth of Stolberg-Wernigerode
3. Catherine of Brunswick-Wolfenbüttel
14. Eric II, Duke of Pomerania
7. Catherine of Pomerania-Wolgast
15. Sophia of Pomerania-Stolp

Dorothea of Saxe-Lauenburg House of Ascania Born: 9 July 1511 Died: 7 October 1571
Royal titles
| Preceded by Sophie of Pomerania | Queen consort of Denmark; 1534–1559 | Succeeded by Sophie of Mecklenburg-Güstrow |
| Vacant Title last held by Sophie of Pomerania | Queen consort of Norway; 1537–1559 | Succeeded by Sophie of Mecklenburg-Güstrow |
