= Ernest I of Brunswick =

Duke of Brunswick

Ernest I
- Duke of Brunswick-Lüneburg
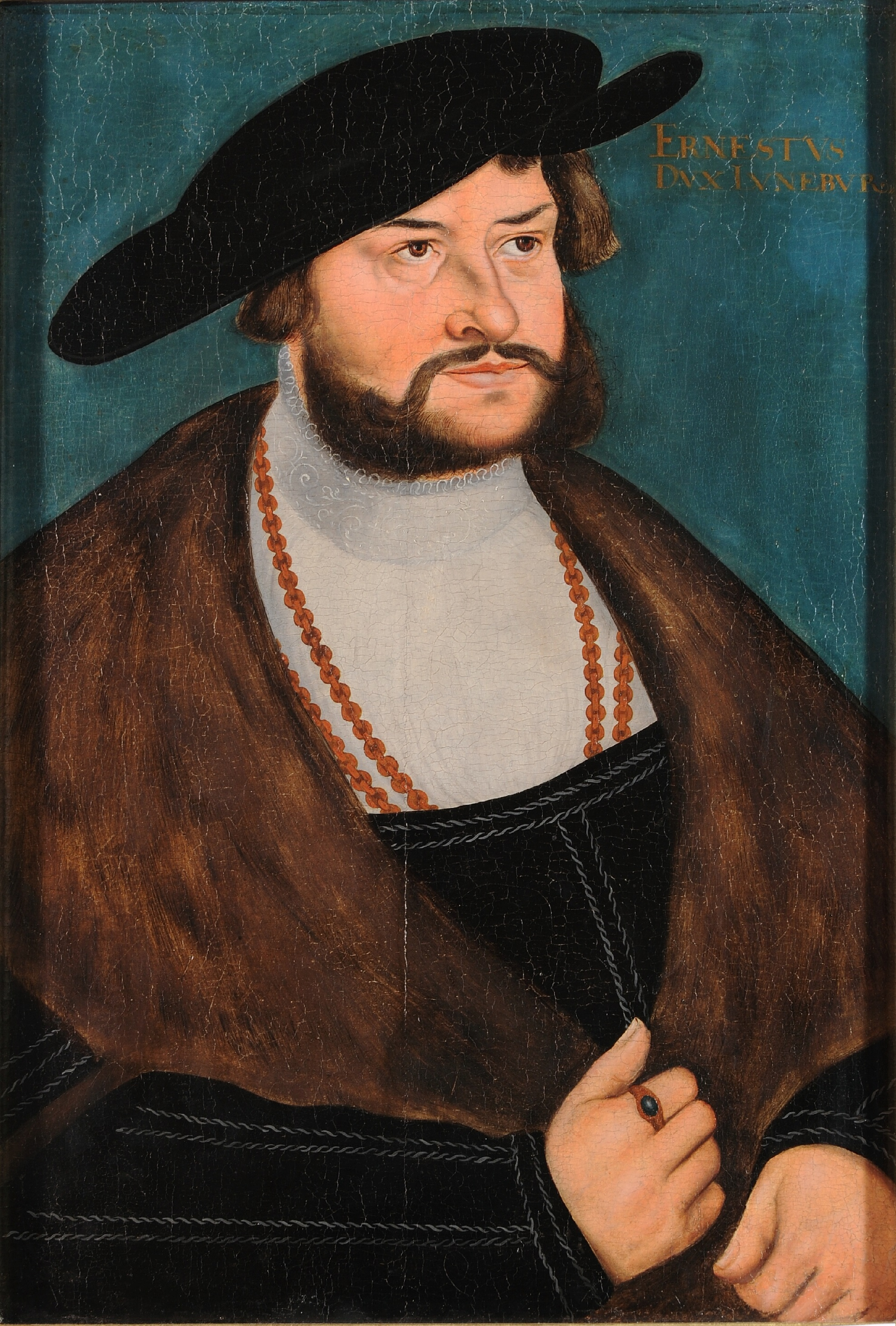
- Painting of Ernest the Confessor by Lucas Cranach the Elder
- Born: 27 June 1497; Uelzen
- Died: 11 January 1546 (aged 48); Celle
- Spouse: Sophia of Mecklenburg-Schwerin (m. 1528; died 1541)
- Issue Detail: Francis Otto, Duke of Brunswick-Lüneburg; Duke Frederick; Henry, Duke of Brunswick-Dannenberg; Margaret, Countess of Mansfeld See; William, Duke of Brunswick-Lüneburg; Elizabeth Ursula, Countess of Schaumburg; Magdalena Sophia, Countess Arnold of Bentheim-Steinfurt; Sophia, Countess of Henneberg-Schleusingen
- House: Welf
- Father: Henry I of Lüneburg
- Mother: Margarete of Saxony
- Religion: Lutheran

Ernest of Brunswick-Lüneburg (German: Ernst der Bekenner; 27 June 1497 – 11 January 1546), also frequently called Ernest the Confessor, was duke of Brunswick-Lüneburg and a champion of the Protestant cause during the early years of the Protestant Reformation. He was the Prince of Lüneburg and ruled the Lüneburg-Celle subdivision of the Welf family's Brunswick-Lüneburg duchy from 1520 until his death.

He was the son of Henry I, Duke of Lüneburg, and Margarete of Saxony, the daughter of Ernest, Elector of Saxony.

== Life ==
Ernest was born in Uelzen of the House of Guelph on 27 June 1497. His father was Henry I of Lüneburg and his mother Margarete of Saxony who was a sister of Frederick the Wise, Elector of Saxony and Champion of Martin Luther. Ernest succeeded as Duke of Brunswick-Lüneburg upon the retirement of his brother Otto in 1527. Ernest, Duke of Brunswick-Lüneburg, married Sophia of Mecklenburg-Schwerin, and he died on 11 January 1547 at the age of 49.

Ernest's life coincided with the Protestant Reformation. In 1512 he was sent to the court of his mother's brother at Wittenberg, the Wettin elector Frederick III (Frederick the Wise), and received instruction there from Georg Spalatin in the University of Wittenberg; he remained at Wittenberg through the beginning of the Protestant Reformation.

In 1520, political frictions with Charles V convinced his father, Henry I of Duke of Brunswick-Lüneburg to abdicate and leave for the French Court which was ardently Catholic. Henry's two eldest sons, Otto and Ernest, became regents of the country. At the urging of the Catholic forces, Henry returned to Lüneberg in 1527 and tried to regain control. But Henry's attempt failed and he returned to France. Henry was allowed to return in 1530 to spend his last days in the princely house in Lüneberg given to him by his eldest son.

Henry's eldest son Otto (24 August 1495 – 11 August 1549), who also had been educated with his brothers at Wittenberg, succeeded as Duke of Brunswick-Lüneburg; he was also the Prince of Lüneburg from 1520 to 1527 and Baron of Harburg from 1527 to 1549. Otto and Ernest appear to have ruled jointly from 1520 to 1527. But with the retirement of Otto, Ernest became sole ruler. The condition of his domain was not prosperous.

=== Introduction of the Reformation to Brunswick-Lüneburg ===
Political considerations furthered the introduction of the Reformation; amongst the commoners it offered opportunity to restrict the privileges of the nobles and the clergy. From the nobles point of view, the Reformation offered the chance to gain from church and monastery property. The forerunner of the Reformation in Lüneburg was Wolf Cyclop, a physician from Zwickau, who was not free from the Zwickau enthusiasm. Moderates such as Gottschalk Cruse, Heinrich Bock, and Matthäus Mylow followed him.

Ernest was inclined to move slowly, but by 1525 the German Peasants' War gave him occasion to join with his brother in requiring the monasteries to declare their properties and to require them to admit Protestant preachers. Ernest had also promised his uncle, the elector of Saxony to stand by the Protestant cause. After an attempt by the Roman Catholic party in 1527 to reinstate his father had failed, Ernest's course became more decided as he succeeded as Duke.

In July 1527, the first book of discipline was adopted, drawn up by the preachers of Celle. At a diet in August of the same year it was ordered that "God's pure word should be preached everywhere without additions made by men." Between 1527 and 1530, Lutheran preachers were introduced in most parishes and monasteries—not in all cases without compulsion. Ernest went to Augsburg in 1530 and signed the Confession. He brought back Urbanus Rhegius, who worked to spread the Reformation, introducing it into the city of Lüneburg. The largest and richest monastery in the land, St. Michael's in Lüneburg, accepted the new order after the death of Abbot Boldewin in 1532. Rhegius died in 1541 and was succeeded by Martin Ondermark, who completed the former's work.

Generally, the preachers were well disposed to the reformed religion, while the people held to the old and only gradually adapted themselves to the new. During the Schmalkald War the greater masses remained true to the Gospel. After 1530, Ernest was the most influential prince of North Germany. He sent Rhegius to Hanover when the Reformation there threatened to become revolution and restored order. In the cities of Westphalia he strengthened the Protestant party against both the Roman Catholics and the enthusiasts, although his efforts were vain in Münster. His influence was also felt in Pomerania and Mecklenburg, in Hoya, and in East Friesland.

=== Schmalkald League ===
Ernest's most effective work probably was accomplished by his restless activity for the Schmalkald League. He induced the North German cities, Hamburg, Bremen, Brunswick, Göttingen, and others to join, and he often became the successful mediator when a rupture was threatened between the overcautious elector of Saxony and the headstrong Philip of Hesse. While Ernest sometimes used harsh measures to accomplish his will, and was actuated by a desire to exalt his position as ruler as well as by higher motives, yet, on the whole, he was faithful to his motto, "aliis inserviendo consumor" ("consumed in service of others"), alternatively appearing as "aliis servio; me ipsum contero" ("I serve others; I wear myself out").

His four sons at his death were still minors, but the Protestant Church of Lüneburg was so firmly established that it could survive the regency and the unhappy time of the Schmalkald War, and to this day the church life of Lüneburg bears the character impressed upon it by Ernest who is now called Ernest the Confessor.

== Children ==
Ernest married Sophia, daughter of Henry V, Duke of Mecklenburg, and Ursula of Brandenburg, on 2 June 1528 in Schwerin. They had:

- Francis Otto, Duke of Brunswick-Lüneburg (1530–1559), married Elisabeth Magdalena of Brandenburg, daughter of Joachim II Hector of Brandenburg and Hedwig of Poland.
- Frederick (1532–1553)
- Henry, Duke of Brunswick-Dannenberg (1533–1598) married Ursula of Saxe-Lauenberg, daughter of Francis I, Duke of Saxe-Lauenburg
- Margaret (1534–1596), married John, Count of Mansfeld See
- William, Duke of Brunswick-Lüneburg (1535–1592), married Dorothea of Denmark, daughter of Christian III of Denmark.
- Elizabeth Ursula (1539–1586), married Otto IV of Schaumburg
- Magdalena Sophia (1540–1586), married Arnold, Count of Bentheim-Steinfurt, a brother of Eberwin III, Count of Bentheim-Steinfurt
- Sophia (1541–1631), married Poppo XVIII, Count of Henneberg-Schleusingen

== Sources ==
- Ward, A.W.; Prothero, G.W.; Leathes, Stanley, eds. (1934). The Cambridge Modern History. Vol. XIII. Cambridge at the University Press.
- Ernest at the House of Welf site
- Allgemeine Deutsche Biographie, vol. 6, p. 260

Ernest I of Brunswick House of Welf Cadet branch of the House of Este Born: 27 June 1497 Died: 11 January 1546
German nobility
Preceded by Henry I	Duke of Brunswick-Lüneburg; Princes of Lüneburg until 1527 joint reign with his brother Otto; 1520–1546	Succeeded by William
