= Sibylle Ursula von Braunschweig-Lüneburg =

German noblewoman, translator and writer (1629–1671)

Sibylle Ursula
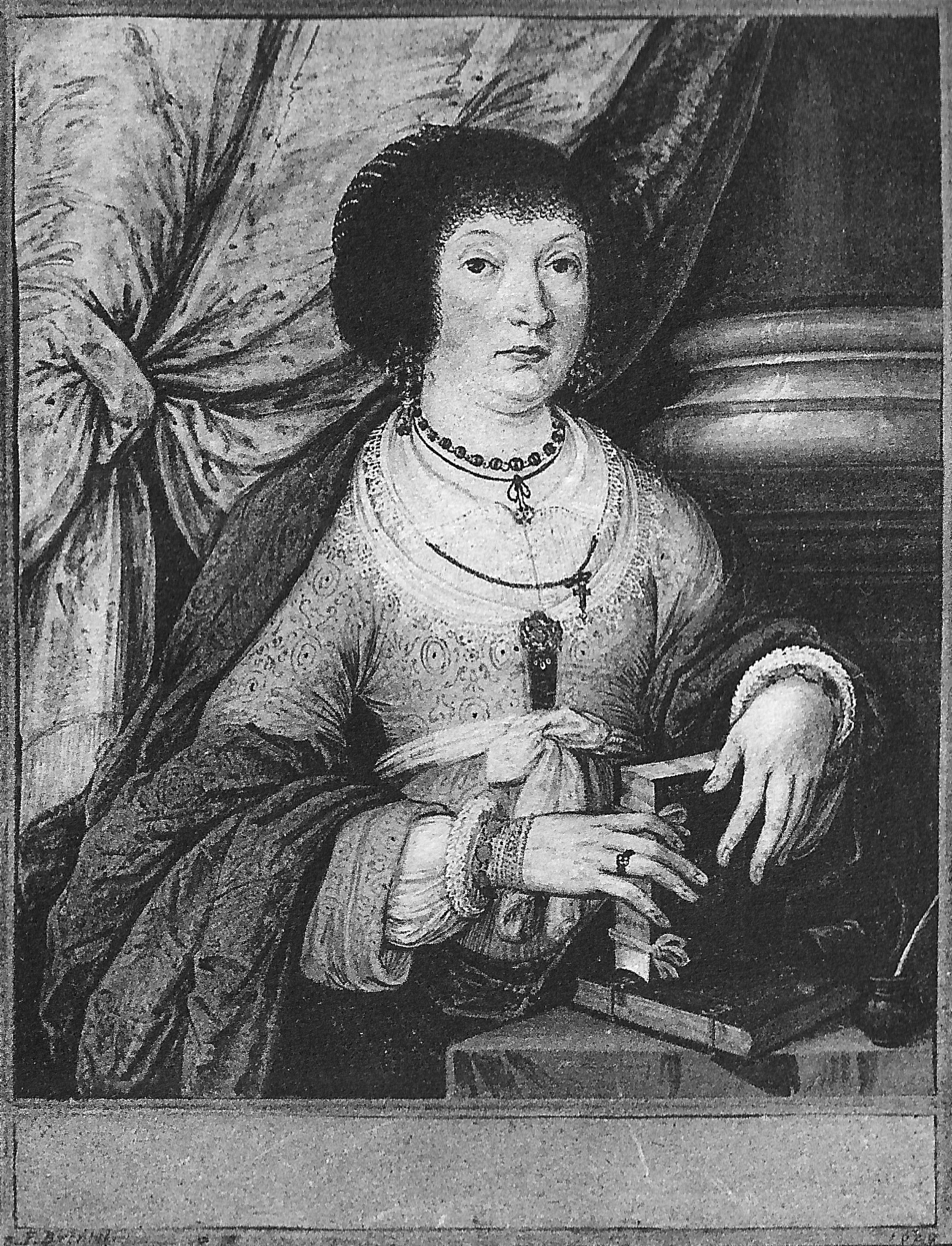
- Anna Sibylle
- Born: 4 February 1629; Hitzacker, Brunswick-Lüneburg
- Died: 12 December 1671 (aged 42); Glücksburg, Schleswig
- Spouse: Christian, Duke of Schleswig-Holstein-Sonderburg-Glücksburg
- House: House of Welf
- Father: Augustus the Younger, Duke of Brunswick-Lüneburg
- Mother: Dorothea of Anhalt-Zerbst

Sibylle Ursula von Braunschweig-Lüneburg, also known as Sibylle von Braunschweig-Lüneburg and Sibylle of Brunswick-Lüneburg, (4 February 1629 – 12 December 1671), a member of the House of Welf, was a daughter of Duke Augustus II of Brunswick-Lüneburg and, by marriage, Duchess of Schleswig-Holstein-Sonderburg-Glücksburg. She stood out as a translator and writer.

== Life and work ==
Sibylle Ursula was born in Hitzacker, the third child of Duke Augustus (1579–1666) from his second marriage with the Ascanian princess Dorothea of Anhalt-Zerbst (1607–1634). Her father assumed the rule in the Principality of Brunswick-Wolfenbüttel in 1634. Sibylle Ursula became the stepdaughter of Elisabeth Sophie of Mecklenburg (1613–1676), the third wife of Duke Augustus who had distinguished herself as a poet and composer. Like her siblings, the Brunswick dukes Rudolph Augustus and Anthony Ulrich, she received a comprehensive education at the Wolfenbüttel court by scholars like Justus Georg Schottel and Sigmund von Birken.

For several years, she kept up a correspondence with Madeleine de Scudéry and Johannes Valentinus Andreae. Sibylle Ursula wrote part of a novel, Die Durchlauchtige Syrerin Aramena (Aramena, the noble Syrian lady), which when complete would be the most famous courtly novel in German Baroque literature; it was finished by her brother Anthony Ulrich and edited by Sigmund von Birken. Other writings of hers include a five-act play and a series of spiritual meditations. Translations of hers include two novels (Cassandre and Cléopâtre) by La Calprenède, parts of Scudéry's Clélie, and Introductio ad sapientiam, one of the Latin writings of Juan Luis Vives, a Spanish humanist.

Initially determined to remain unmarried, in 1663 she eventually entered into marriage with Duke Christian of Schleswig-Holstein-Sonderburg-Glücksburg (1627–1698), at the age of 34. Her husband, the only surviving son of Duke Philip of Schleswig-Holstein-Glücksburg, had taken over the rule at Glücksburg Castle the year before and was able to restore public finances with the help of his Wolfenbüttel relatives.

Sibylle Ursula fell seriously ill already in 1664, probably from syphilis passed on by her husband, which brought an ending to her artistic work. Suffering from an ever-increasingly depressive state, she died in childbirth. None of her children reached adulthood.
