= Augustus William, Duke of Brunswick-Wolfenbüttel =

Augustus William
- Duke of Brunswick-Lüneburg; Prince of Wolfenbüttel
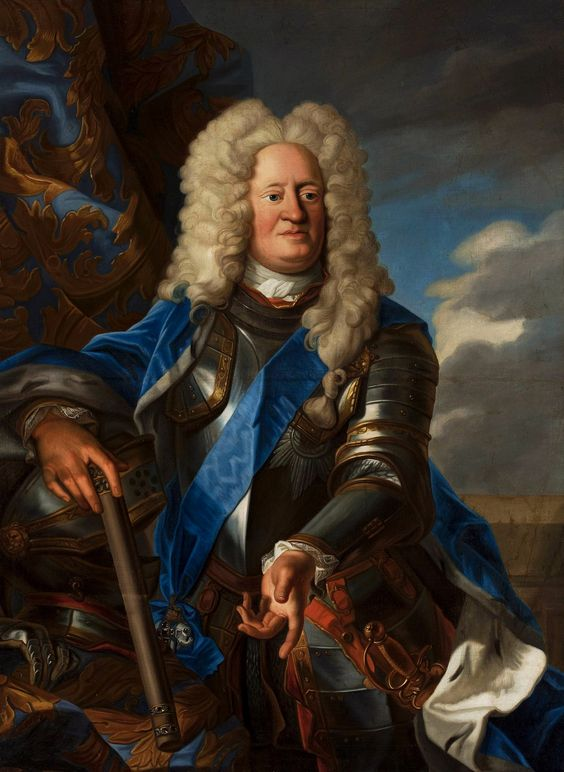
- Portrait by Christoph Bernhard Francke

Prince of Brunswick-Wolfenbüttel
- Reign: 27 March 1714 - 23 March 1731
- Predecessor: Anthony Ulrich
- Successor: Louis Rudolph
- Born: 8 March 1662; Wolfenbüttel, Brunswick-Lüneburg
- Died: 23 March 1731 (aged 69)
- Spouse: Christine Sophie of Brunswick-Lüneburg; Sophie Amalie of Holstein-Gottorp; Elisabeth Sophie Marie of Schleswig-Holstein-Sonderburg-Norburg
- House: House of Welf
- Father: Anthony Ulrich, Duke of Brunswick-Wolfenbüttel
- Mother: Princess Elisabeth Juliana of Schleswig-Holstein-Sonderburg-Norburg

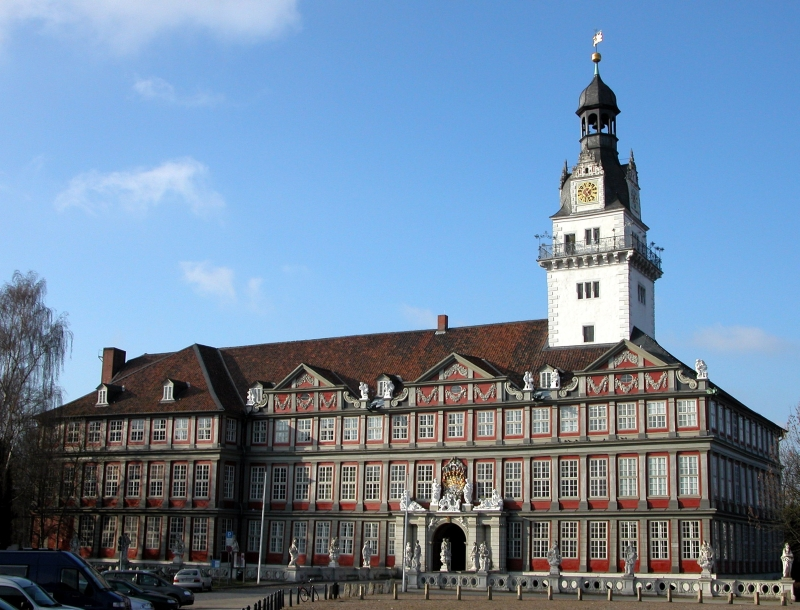
Wolfenbüttel Castle

Augustus William (German: August Wilhelm; 8 March 1662 – 23 March 1731), a member of the House of Welf, was Duke of Brunswick-Lüneburg and ruling Prince of Wolfenbüttel from 1714 until his death.

== Life ==
Augustus William was the third, but eldest surviving son of Duke Anthony Ulrich and his consort Elizabeth Juliane, a daughter of Duke Frederick of Schleswig-Holstein-Sønderburg-Norburg. Unlike his father, the young prince was not interested in politics; he studied at the University of Geneva from 1677 to 1678 and afterwards went on a Grand Tour from Switzerland to France and the Netherlands.

Nevertheless, in 1681 his uncle, the ruling Prince Rudolph Augustus of Braunschweig-Wolfenbüttel, who himself had no male heirs, adopted him as crown prince. The agreement annoyed Augustus William's father and led to a growing estrangement between them. Moreover, his right of succession was contested by Rudolph Augustus' son-in-law Duke John Adolphus of Schleswig-Holstein-Sonderburg-Plön. The prince temporarily retired to Langeleben in the Elm hill range, where he had a hunting lodge erected, probably according to plans designed by Hermann Korb. Meanwhile, he also acted as a Wolfenbüttel envoy to the Brandenburg-Prussian, Swedish, and Danish courts. In 1690 he gave his consent to cede the Brunswick County of Blankenburg to his younger brother Louis Rudolph, thus violating the Welf primogeniture principle.

Augustus William succeeded his father as Prince of Wolfenbüttel in 1714. He had his Wolfenbüttel residence extended, but left political decisions to corrupt ministers. His splendid court severely burdened the public budget.

Even though he was married three times, he died childless in 1731 and was succeeded by his brother Louis Rudolph. Despite his marriages, he claimed to have been introduced to the "art" of homosexuality in Venice; later falling in love with Raugrave Karl Ludwig von der Pfalz, half-brother of Princess Elizabeth Charlotte.

== Family ==
1. In 1681, he married Christine Sophie of Brunswick-Lüneburg (1654–1695), daughter of Rudolph Augustus, Duke of Brunswick-Lüneburg.
2. In 1695, he married Sophie Amalie of Holstein-Gottorp (1670–1710), daughter of Christian Albert, Duke of Holstein-Gottorp.
3. In 1710, he married Elisabeth Sophie Marie of Schleswig-Holstein-Sonderburg-Norburg (1683–1767), daughter of Prince Rudolph Frederick of Schleswig-Holstein-Sonderburg-Norburg (he was the son of Frederick, Duke of Schleswig-Holstein-Sønderburg-Norburg).

== Ancestors ==
Ancestors of Augustus William, Duke of Brunswick-Wolfenbüttel

8. Henry, Duke of Brunswick-Dannenberg
4. Augustus II, Duke of Brunswick-Wolfenbüttel
9. Princess Ursula of Saxe-Lauenburg
2. Anthony Ulrich, Duke of Brunswick-Wolfenbüttel
10. Rudolph, Prince of Anhalt-Zerbst
5. Princess Dorothea of Anhalt-Zerbst
11. Duchess Dorothea Hedwig of Brunswick-Wolfenbüttel
1. Augustus William, Duke of Brunswick-Wolfenbüttel
12. John II, Duke of Schleswig-Holstein-Sonderburg
6. Frederick, Duke of Schleswig-Holstein-Sonderburg-Norburg
13. Duchess Elisabeth of Brunswick-Grubenhagen
3. Princess Elisabeth Juliana of Schleswig-Holstein-Sonderburg-Norburg
14. Rudolph, Prince of Anhalt-Zerbst (= 10)
7. Princess Eleanor of Anhalt-Zerbst
15. Duchess Dorothea Hedwig of Brunswick-Wolfenbüttel (= 11)

Augustus William, Duke of Brunswick-Wolfenbüttel House of Welf Cadet branch of the House of Este Born: 8 March 1662 Died: 23 March 1731
Regnal titles
Preceded by Anthony Ulrich	Duke of Brunswick-Lüneburg; Prince of Brunswick-Wolfenbüttel; 1714–1731	Succeeded by Louis Rudolph
