= Anthony Ulrich, Duke of Brunswick =

Duke of Brunswick-Lüneburg and ruling Prince of Brunswick-Wolfenbüttel (1633–1714)

Anthony Ulrich
- Duke of Brunswick-Lüneburg
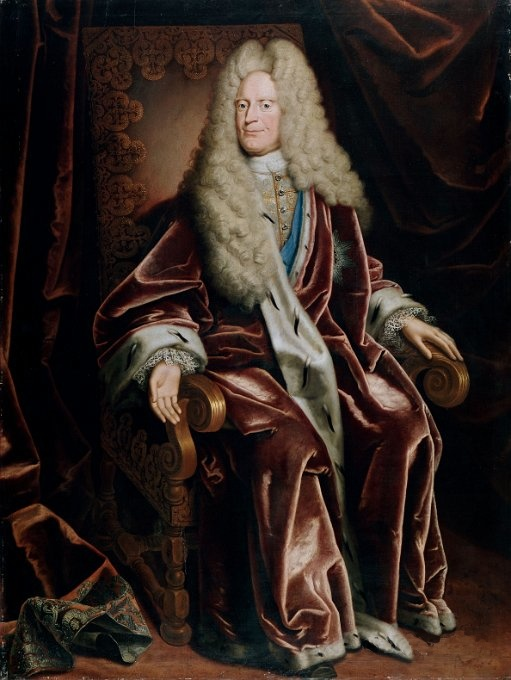
- Portrait by Christoph Bernhard Francke

Prince of Brunswick-Wolfenbüttel
- Reign: 18 April 1685 – 27 March 1714
- Predecessor: Rudolph Augustus
- Successor: Augustus William
- Born: 4 October 1633; Hitzacker, Brunswick-Lüneburg, Holy Roman Empire
- Died: 27 March 1714 (aged 80); Salzdahlum, Brunswick-Lüneburg, Holy Roman Empire
- Burial: Marienkirche, Wolfenbüttel
- Spouse: Elisabeth Juliane of Schleswig-Holstein-Sonderburg-Norburg
- Issue: Augustus Frederick; Elizabeth Eleanore Sophie; Anne Sophie; Augustus William; Augusta Dorothea; Henrietta Christine, Abbess of Gandersheim; Louis Rudolph
- House: House of Welf
- Father: Augustus the Younger, Duke of Brunswick-Lüneburg
- Mother: Dorothea of Anhalt-Zerbst

Anthony Ulrich (German: Anton Ulrich; 4 October 1633 – 27 March 1714), a member of the House of Welf, was Duke of Brunswick-Lüneburg and ruling Prince of Brunswick-Wolfenbüttel from 1685 until 1702 jointly with his elder brother Rudolph Augustus, and solely from 1704 until his death. He was one of the main proponents of enlightened absolutism among the Brunswick dukes.

== Life ==
He was born in Hitzacker, then the residence of his father Duke Augustus the Younger of Brunswick-Lüneburg (1579–1666) and his second wife Princess Dorothea of Anhalt-Zerbst (1607–1634). The next year his father, at the age of 55, assumed the rule in the Principality of Brunswick-Wolfenbüttel after his Welf cousin Duke Frederick Ulrich had died childless.

=== Early years ===
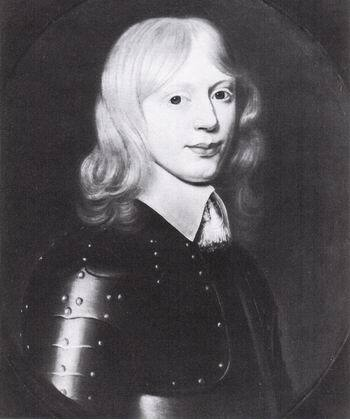
Young Prince Anthony Ulrich

Anthony Ulrich was the second surviving son of the ducal couple; he and his siblings received a comprehensive education at the Wolfenbüttel court by scholars like Justus Georg Schottel and Sigmund von Birken, as well as by his art-minded stepmother Elisabeth Sophie of Mecklenburg (1613–1676). Anthony Ulrich's sister was Sibylle Ursula von Braunschweig-Lüneburg (1629–1671), who stood out as a writer and translator.

He studied at the University of Helmstedt where he obtained a doctorate in theology. On his Grand Tour, he travelled to Italy and the Low Countries, he met with Madeleine de Scudéry and became passionate about theatre. When he married Elisabeth Juliane (1633–1704), daughter of Duke Frederick of Schleswig-Holstein-Sønderburg-Norburg, in 1656, he wrote a stage play on this occasion.

=== Co-ruler ===
Already his father consulted him in politics and the government business. After Augustus the Younger's death in 1666, Rudolph Augustus, Anthony Ulrich's elder brother, became reigning duke and made Anthony Ulrich his proxy. Rudolph Augustus had more interest in hunting and his library than in government affairs and left most decisions to his brother; in 1685, he officially made Anthony Ulrich a coregent with equal rights. The young prince united the forces of the Welf principalities to combat the rebellious City of Brunswick, whose citizens finally had to accept the ducal overlordship in 1671. In the following year, however, his main concern was the rivalry with his cousin Duke Ernest Augustus, who from 1679 ruled over the Brunswick Principality of Calenberg.

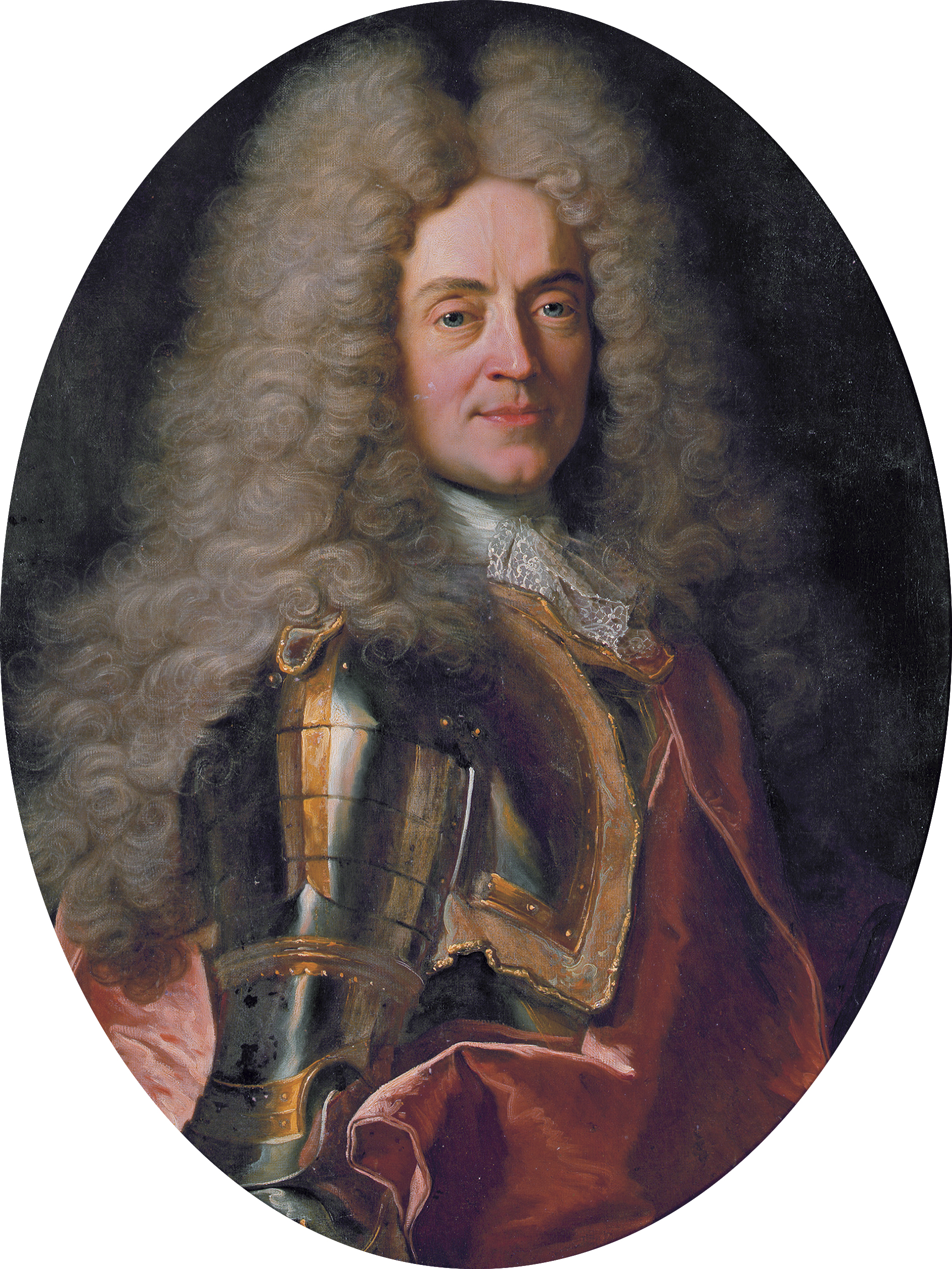
Duke Anthony Ulrich, portrait by Hyacinthe Rigaud

After Ernest Augustus had received the new ninth prince-electorship from Emperor Leopold I in 1692 and went on to rule as Elector of Hanover, tensions between the two states rose, as both Anthony Ulrich and Rudolph Augustus were dismayed that they had not received the electorship according to the right of primogeniture. While both Hanover under Ernest Augustus' son Elector George Louis and the Welf Principality of Lüneburg sided with the Habsburg emperor in the War of the Spanish Succession, Anthony Ulrich decided to enter into an agreement with King Louis XIV of France. This led to Hanover and Lüneburg forces invading the Principality of Wolfenbüttel in March 1702; Anthony Ulrich was almost captured while travelling from his Wolfenbüttel residence to Brunswick. By order of the emperor, Anthony Ulrich was deposed as duke against his brother's protestations, and Rudolph Augustus remained as the only Wolfenbüttel ruler, while Anthony Ulrich fled to Saxe-Gotha. In April 1702, Rudolph Augustus signed a treaty with Hanover and Lüneburg that Anthony Ulrich later agreed to.

=== Sole ruler ===
After Rudolph Augustus' death in 1704, Anthony Ulrich took over government again. He continued to settle various disputes with his Hanover cousin George Louis, who in 1705 also inherited Lüneburg, until a final agreement between the two sister principalities was reached in 1706. Wolfenbüttel also renounced all claims to the former Ascanian duchy of Saxe-Lauenburg and received several smaller estates in compensation.

It was now Anthony Ulrich's turn to approach the Imperial Habsburg dynasty. In 1704, he had concluded an agreement with his cousin Wilhelmine Amalia of Brunswick-Lüneburg, wife of the future Emperor Joseph I, to marry his granddaughter Elisabeth Christine off to Joseph's brother Archduke Charles of Austria. The young woman was reluctant to convert to the Catholic faith, which she finally did in a solemn ceremony at Bamberg Cathedral on 1 May 1707. The marriage took place the next year in Vienna.

In 1709, Anthony Ulrich himself converted to the Catholic Church. He guaranteed to his subjects that this would not influence his government, although he allowed the consecration of the first Catholic church in Brunswick. He lived to see the election of Archduke Charles as Emperor Charles VI in 1711 and also the marriage of his granddaughter Charlotte Christine with Alexei Petrovich Romanov, son of Tsar Peter I, in the same year.

He died at the age of 80 at his Schloss Salzdahlum residence, which he had built, and was buried in the crypt of the Wolfenbüttel Marienkirche. He was succeeded by his eldest surviving son, Augustus William.

== Patron of the arts ==
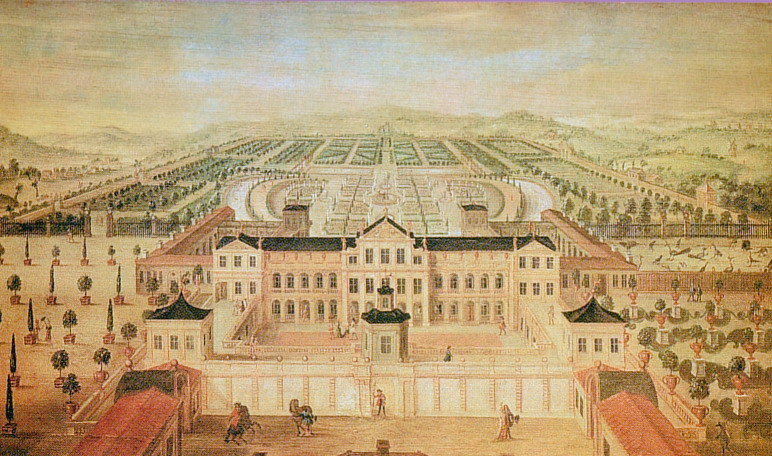
Schloss Salzdahlum (demolished in 1813)

As an admirer of King Louis XIV of France, Anthony Ulrich is known as a supporter of scholarship and the arts. He introduced the French language at the Wolfenbüttel court and often spent enormous sums on cultural events and amusements. From 1689 to 1690, he had a public opera house erected in Brunswick, Staatstheater Braunschweig, which soon became a venue for Baroque composers such as Johann Rosenmüller, Johann Sigismund Kusser, Reinhard Keiser, Georg Caspar Schürmann, and Johann Adolph Hasse.

He significantly extended the Bibliotheca Augusta, a library founded by his father. He hired the philosopher Leibniz as a librarian, and was a supporter of Anton Wilhelm Amo, the first black Doctor of Philosophy in Europe. The new rotunda of the Bibliotheca Augusta, built according to plans by Hermann Korb and completed in 1712, was the first genuine library building in Germany. Hermann Korb also designed the plans for Schloss Salzdahlum which was erected between 1694 and 1695, modelled on the French Château de Marly. Here the Prussian crown prince Frederick II married Elisabeth Christine of Brunswick-Wolfenbüttel-Bevern in 1733.

Anthony Ulrich also was a writer and had a large art collection, which later became the foundation of the Herzog Anton Ulrich Museum (Duke Anthony Ulrich Museum). His sister Sibylle Ursula wrote part of a novel, Die Durchlauchtige Syrerin Aramena (Aramena, the noble Syrian lady), which when complete would be the most famous courtly novel in German Baroque literature; it was finished by Anthony Ulrich and edited by Sigmund von Birken.

== Marriage and children ==
Anthony Ulrich married his cousin Elizabeth Juliana, daughter of Frederick, Duke of Schleswig-Holstein-Sønderburg-Nordborg, in 1656. They had 13 children, seven of whom reached adulthood:

- Augustus Frederick (24 August 1657 – 22 August 1676), died aged 18, no issue.
- Elizabeth Eleanor Sophie (1658–1729), married John George, Duke of Mecklenburg-Mirow and Bernhard I, Duke of Saxe-Meiningen
- Anne Sophie (29 October 1659 – 28 June 1742), married Charles Gustav of Baden-Durlach
- Leopold Augustus (27 February 1661 – 5 March 1662), died in infancy
- Augustus William (1662–1731)
- Augustus Henry (14 August 1663 – 24 February 1664), died in infancy
- Augustus Charles (4 August 1664 – 20 December 1664), died in infancy
- Augustus Francis (6 October 1665 – 4 December 1666), died in infancy
- Augusta Dorothea (1666–1751), married Anton Günther II, Count of Schwarzburg-Sondershausen-Arnstadt
- Amalia Antonia (7 June 1668 – 1 November 1668), died in infancy
- Henrietta Christine (1669–1753), Abbess of Gandersheim
- Louis Rudolph (1671–1735)
- Sibylla Ursula (3 September 1672 – 1 April 1673), died in infancy

== Ancestry ==
Ancestors of Anthony Ulrich, Duke of Brunswick

8. Ernest I, Duke of Brunswick-Lüneburg
4. Henry, Duke of Brunswick-Dannenberg
9. Sophie of Mecklenburg-Schwerin
2. Augustus II, Duke of Brunswick-Wolfenbüttel
10. Francis I, Duke of Saxe-Lauenburg
5. Ursula of Saxe-Lauenburg
11. Sibylle of Saxony
1. Anthony Ulrich, Duke of Brunswick-Wolfenbüttel
12. Joachim Ernest, Prince of Anhalt
6. Rudolph, Prince of Anhalt-Zerbst
13. Eleonore of Württemberg
3. Dorothea of Anhalt-Zerbst
14. Henry Julius, Duke of Brunswick-Wolfenbüttel
7. Dorothea Hedwig of Brunswick-Wolfenbüttel
15. Dorothea of Saxony

== Works ==
- Die Durchlauchtige Syrerin Aramena (Aramena, the noble Syrian lady; 1669–1673) - with Sibylle Ursula von Braunschweig-Lüneburg (5 parts/volumes).
- Die Römische Octavia (Octavia the Roman; 1677–1713, 1762) - unfinished mega novel in 7 complete volumes with an unfinished 8th volume).
- The Duke of Brunswick's Fifty Reasons, for Prefering the Roman Catholic Religion to All the Sects, Manchester: R. & W. Dean and Co., 1802.

Anthony Ulrich, Duke of Brunswick House of Welf Cadet branch of the House of Este Born: 4 October 1633 Died: 27 March 1714
Regnal titles
Preceded by Rudolph Augustus	Duke of Brunswick-Lüneburg; Prince of Brunswick-Wolfenbüttel with his brother Rudolph Augustus; 1685–1702	Succeeded by Rudolph Augustus
Preceded by Rudolph Augustus	Duke of Brunswick-Lüneburg; Prince of Brunswick-Wolfenbüttel; 1704–1714	Succeeded by Augustus William
