= Justus Georg Schottelius =

German grammarian

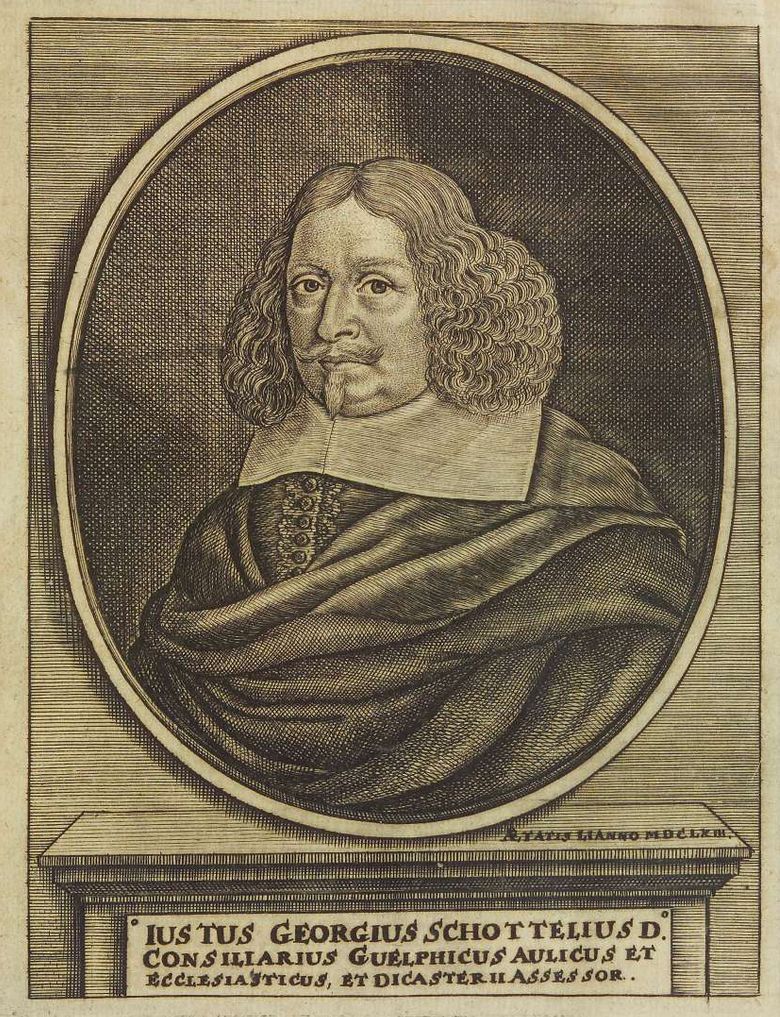
Justus Georgius Schottelius

Justus Georg Schottelius (Latinized Justus-Georgius Schottelius; 23 June 1612, Einbeck – 25 October 1676, Wolfenbüttel) was a German grammarian, best known for his publications on German grammar, language theory and poetics.

== Life ==
Justus-Georg Schottelius was born in Einbeck, which in 1612 was a Low German-speaking area. He was the son of a Lutheran pastor; his mother came from a merchant family. Justus-Georg regularly styled himself Schottelius, and this must be regarded as the correct form of his name, though after his death the de-Latinized form Schottel long persisted in scholarly writings and is still sometimes used.

Surmounting the many upheavals of the Thirty Years' War (1618–48) and the untimely death of his father, Schottelius managed to acquire a good education, notably at the Akademisches Gymnasium in Hamburg and at the universities of Groningen, Leiden, Leipzig and Wittenberg. In 1640 he found employment as tutor to the children of Duke August the Younger of Braunschweig-Lüneburg (1579–1666), including August's heir, Anton Ulrich (1633–1714). Schottelius wrote several plays for his pupils to perform, some with musical accompaniments composed by August's consort, Sophie Elisabeth, or in one case by Heinrich Schütz (1585–1672). In 1646 he married Anna Margarete Eleonore Cleve, but she died the following year. His second wife, whom he married in 1649, was Anna Margarete Sobbe. During the 1640s and 1650s Schottelius rose to prominent administrative positions at court. He also had access to the magnificent ducal library at Wolfenbüttel, and he continued to reside in that town until his death.

Schottelius quickly established himself in the early 1640s as a powerful protagonist of the German language. Admitted in 1642 to the leading patriotic language society, the Fruchtbringende Gesellschaft or 'Fructifying Society', Schottelius took as his society name Der Suchende ('The Seeker'), engaging vigorously in its controversies on fundamentals of grammar and lexical purity. In 1645 or 1646 he became a member of the Pegnesischer Blumenorden, headed in Nürnberg by Georg Philipp Harsdörffer (1607–1658) and later Sigmund von Birken (1626–1681). In 1646 he obtained a doctorate in laws at the University of Helmstedt.

== Achievements as a writer ==
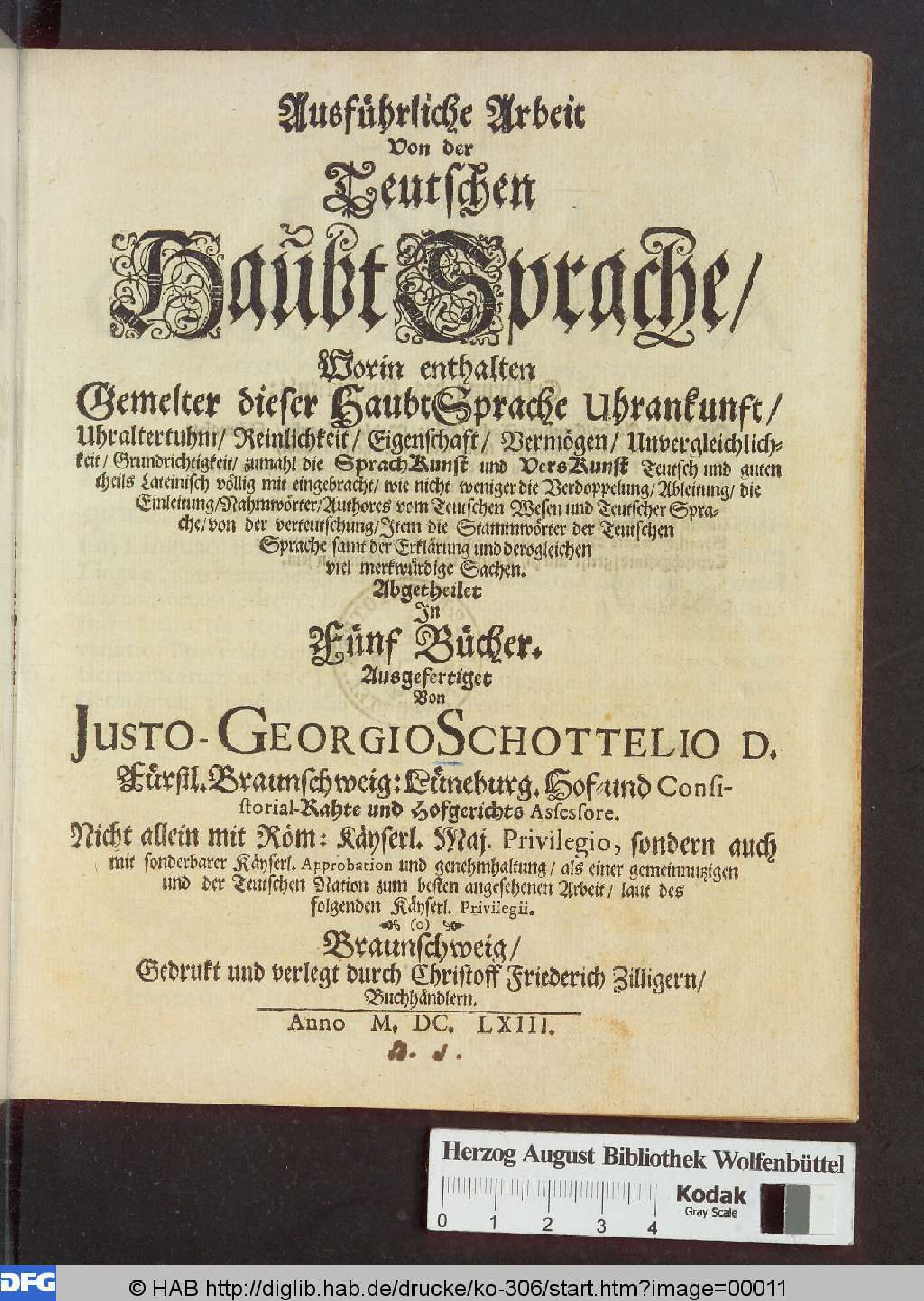
Ausführliche Arbeit Von der Teutschen HaubtSprache, 1663

Though he also distinguished himself in the fields of poetry, poetic theory and drama, Schottelius is chiefly memorable for his insights and achievements as a linguist. Acting like many of his contemporaries in a spirit of cultural and linguistic patriotism. he sought to raise the lowly status of German, to celebrate its high antiquity, to defend it against latter-day foreign influences, to re-examine it in the light of current linguistic theory, to promote its refinement and use as a communicative medium, and ultimately to inaugurate a new, prestigious epoch in the language. This process was known among contemporaries as Spracharbeit.

For his début as a language reformer, Schottelius chose a poetic medium. His Lamentatio Germaniae exspirantis (1640) attacked in stately alexandrines and lurid metaphors the corrupt state of the language, in particular the burgeoning over-use of foreign words. In a dying lament, the once fair nymph Germania presents herself as a grotesque hag. Venerated down the ages, and even meriting the crown of Europe, she now prostitutes herself, begging words from French, Spanish, Italian and English. For all his potent rhetoric, Schottelius's linguistic purism was of a somewhat moderate kind, when compared with his contemporary Philipp von Zesen (1619–1689). But his championship of the German language was without equal.

=== Ausführliche Arbeit Von der Teutschen HaubtSprache ===
Schottelius's magnum opus, his Ausführliche Arbeit Von der Teutschen HaubtSprache, appeared in 1663. Running to over 1,500 pages, it incorporated substantial amounts of material that had appeared earlier, notably in his Teutsche Sprachkunst of 1641. Aimed at a learned, international readership, with much use of Latin alongside German, the Ausführliche Arbeit is a compendium of remarkable range and depth. Combining many discourse traditions, it embraces language history, orthography, accidence, word-formation, idioms, proverbs, syntax, versification, onomastics and other features, including a dictionary of more than 10,000 German root-words . Heading the work (pp. 1–170) are ten so-called eulogies (Lobreden): these are massively documented, programmatic statements characterising many aspects of the German language, past and present, and claiming for it the status of a 'cardinal' language (Hauptsprache) alongside Latin, Greek and Hebrew. One key argument here was the German language's rich lexical productivity, its ability to combine root-words (Wurtzeln, Stammwörter, mostly monosyllabic) and affixes (Hauptendungen) in ways which gave it unique and infinite powers of expression. To depict nature in all her variety, it had, for example, the means to name hundreds of different colours, as Schottelius showed in some detail.

Seeking to demonstrate that the German language had a rational basis, Schottelius based his grammar partly on the Classical principle of analogy, identifying (and sometimes even artificially creating) patterns of regularity or similarity in spelling and grammatical inflection. But as a grammarian he also acknowledged countless anomalies or irregularities in the language, and he respected written usage in what he regarded as its most exemplary forms. In the 17th century, German was still in the long and difficult process of becoming standardized or codified. Influential here was Schottelius's own conception of High German as a language transcending the many dialects, and as currently used in writing by 'learned, wise and experienced men' (viri docti, sapientes et periti). Schottelius argued distinctively that this idealized, supra-regional form of German could not be acquired spontaneously, and certainly not from speech: it had to be 'learnt through much diligence and toil' (durch viel Fleis und Arbeit ... erlernet).

=== Legacy ===
Schottelius’s truly 'comprehensive' work dominated the German linguistic field until Johann Christoph Gottsched (1700-1766), whose authoritative grammars appeared from 1748 onwards. Schottelius's wider legacy has been variously assessed, but it lies mainly in the development of linguistic ideas, with measurable influences to be found in early grammars of Danish, Dutch, Swedish and Russian, and in theoretical writings on these and other languages.

== Major works ==
- Lamentatio Germaniae exspirantis. Der numehr hinsterbenden Nymphen Germaniae elendeste Todesklage. Braunschweig: Gruber. 1640.
- Teutsche Sprachkunst, Darinn die Allerwortreichste, Prächtigste, reinlichste, vollkommene, Uhralte Hauptsprache der Teutschen auß jhren Gründen erhoben, dero Eigenschafften und Kunststücke völliglich entdeckt, und also in eine richtige Form der Kunst zum ersten mahle gebracht worden. Abgetheilet in Drey Bücher. Braunschweig: Gruber. 1641.
- Der Teutschen Sprach Einleitung, Zu richtiger gewisheit und grundmeßigem vermügen der Teutschen Haubtsprache, samt beygefügten Erklärungen. Lüneburg. 1643.
- Teutsche Vers- oder ReimKunst darin Unsere Teutsche Muttersprache, so viel dero süßeste Poesis betrift, in eine richtige Form der Kunst zum ersten mahle gebracht worden. Wolfenbüttel. 1645.
- Ausführliche Arbeit Von der Teutschen HaubtSprache, Worin enthalten Gemelter dieser HaubtSprache Uhrankunft, Uhraltertuhm, Reinlichkeit, Eigenschaft, Vermögen, Unvergleichlichkeit, Grundrichtigkeit, zumahl die SprachKunst und VersKunst Teutsch und guten theils Lateinisch völlig mit eingebracht, wie nicht weniger die Verdoppelung, Ableitung, die Einleitung, Nahmwörter, Authores vom Teutschen Wesen und Teutscher Sprache, von der verteutschung, Item die Stammwörter der Teutschen Sprache samt der Erklärung und derogleichen viel merkwürdige Sachen .... Braunschweig: Christoph Friedrich Zilligern. 1663. 1995 Reprint

== Bibliography ==
- Dünnhaupt, Gerhard (1991). "Justus Georg Schottelius (1612-1676)". Personalbibliographien zu den Drucken des Barock. Vol. 5. Stuttgart: Hiersemann. pp. 3824–3846. ISBN 3-7772-9133-1.
- Gardt, Andreas (1999). Geschichte der Sprachwissenschaft in Deutschland. Vom Mittelalter bis ins 20. Jahrhundert. Berlin, New York: de Gruyter. ISBN 3-11-015788-8. (on cultural patriotism pp. 103–119; on Schottelius pp. 119–127)
- Hecht, Wolfgang (1995). "Biographische Daten". In Hecht, Wolfgang (ed.). Ausführliche Arbeit von der teutschen HaubtSprache. Tübingen: Niemeyer. pp. 20ff. ISBN 978-3-11-094046-6. (Facsimile of 1663 edition.)
- Hundt, Markus (2000). "Spracharbeit" im 17. Jahrhundert. Studien zu Georg Philipp Harsdörffer, Justus Georg Schottelius und Christian Gueintz. Berlin, New York: de Gruyter. ISBN 3-11-016798-0.
- Jones, William Jervis (1999). Images of Language. Six Essays on German Attitudes to European Languages from 1500 to 1800. Amsterdam, Philadelphia: Benjamins. ISBN 90-272-4577-0.
- Jones, William Jervis (2013). German Colour Terms. A study in their historical evolution from earliest times to the present. Amsterdam, Philadelphia: Benjamins. pp. 182–185. ISBN 978-90-272-4610-3.
- McLelland, Nicola (2011). J. G. Schottelius's "Ausführliche Arbeit von der Teutschen HaubtSprache" (1663) and its place in early modern European vernacular language study. Publications of the Philological Society, 44. Chichester: Wiley-Blackwell. ISBN 978-1-4051-9270-5.
- Moulin-Fankhänel, Claudine (1997). Bibliographie der deutschen Grammatiken und Orthographielehren. Vol. 2. Das 17. Jahrhundert. Heidelberg: Winter. pp. 277–297. ISBN 9783825302269.
