= Elisabeth Sophie Marie of Brunswick-Wolfenbüttel =

German noblewoman and book collector (1683 – 1767)

- Duchess of Brunswick-Wolfenbüttel
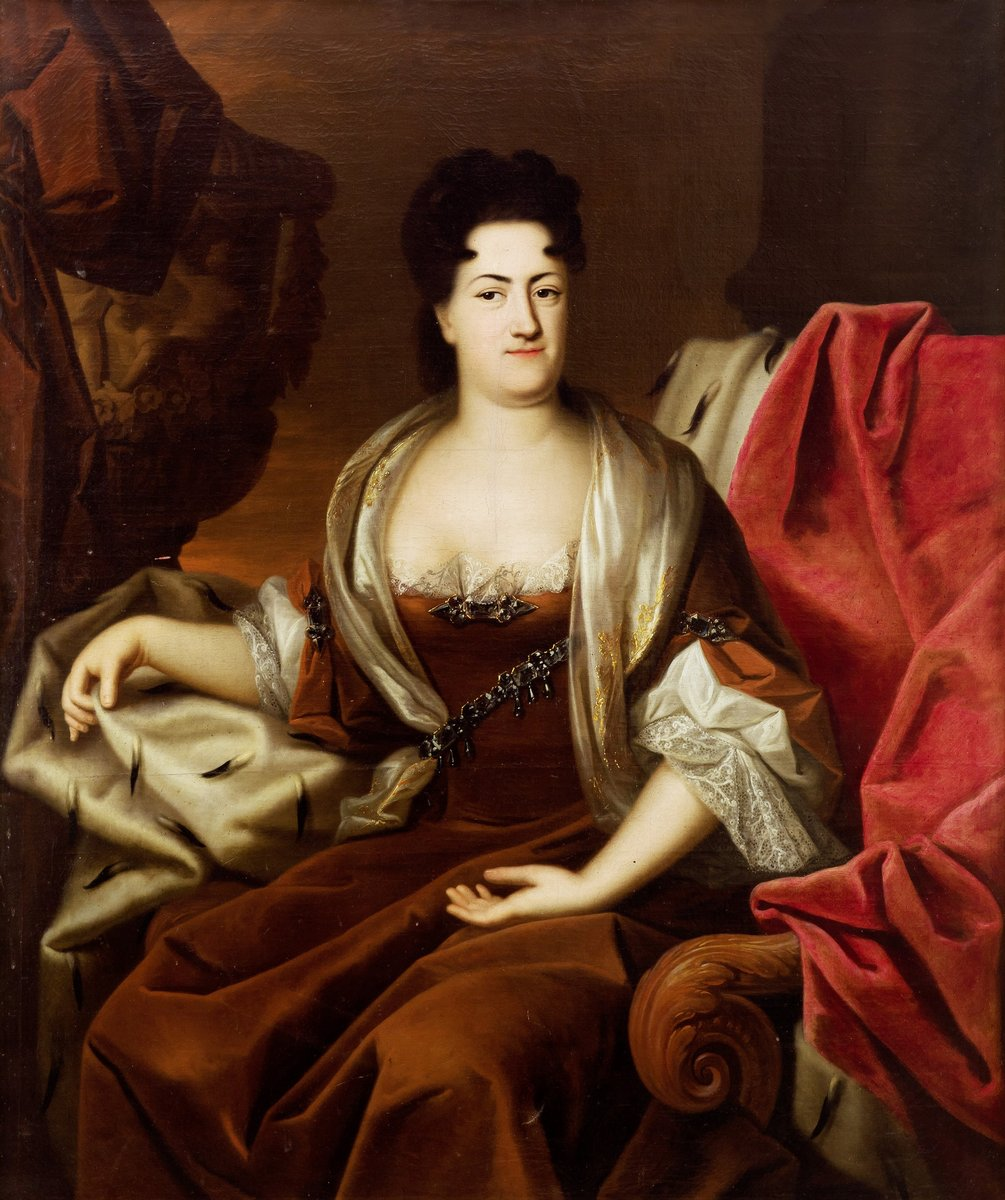
- Elisabeth in about 1720, painted by Christoph Bernhard Francke
- Known for: Collection of over 1200 bibles
- Born: 1683
- Died: 1767 (aged 83–84)
- Spouses: Adolf August, Hereditary Prince of Schleswig-Holstein-Sonderburg-Plön; Augustus William, Duke of Brunswick-Wolfenbüttel
- Father: Rudolph Frederick of Schleswig-Holstein-Sonderborg-Norburg
- Mother: Bibiana von Promnitz in Pless

Elisabeth Sophie Marie of Brunswick-Wolfenbüttel (1683 – 1767) was a German noblewoman and book collector. Her collection of over four thousand books, including multilingual bible translations, now form part of the Herzog August Library.

== Life ==
She was the daughter of Rudolph Friedrich, Duke of Schleswig-Holstein-Sonderburg-Norburg and his wife, Bibiana von Promnitz. When she was orphaned at the age of five, she was raised by her aunt Elisabeth Juliane (who was herself a book collector) at Wolfenbüttel.

In 1701, she married Adolf August of Schleswig-Holstein-Sonderburg-Plön. They had a son, Leopold. Adolf died in 1704, leaving Elisabeth as regent for their son, who died two years later. Elisabeth moved to her widow’s seat in Ahrensbök.

In 1710, she married her cousin and godfather, Augustus William, Duke of Brunswick-Wolfenbüttel. When he died in 1731, having had no children, Elisabeth moved to Grauer Hof in Brunswick, which she had obtained in her second marriage contract, for the rest of her life.

== Writing and book collection ==
Elisabeth wrote two books, published in 1714 and 1750, critiquing Catholic dogmas from a Reformed perspective. She was a patroness of theologian Johann Lorenz von Mosheim and of the cloister at Marienberg.

In 1740 Elisabeth began to expand her book collection. Her collection of 1200 bibles included 47 polyglot bibles, 19 Hebrew bibles, nine each of Latin and Arabic bibles, and two each of Turkish and Malaysian bibles. She was particularly interested in editions and translations of the Luther Bible. She exhibited these books to visitors in her apartments.

In 1764, she donated her bible collection to Brunswick Palace with instructions for how they were to be made available to future scholars, and displayed alongside portraits of herself. Elisabeth’s collections, including the 3000 non-biblical volumes which came to Brunswick after her death, currently form a major part of the Herzog August Library.
