= Dorothea of Anhalt-Zerbst =

Duchess of Brunswick-Wolfenbüttel (1607–1634)

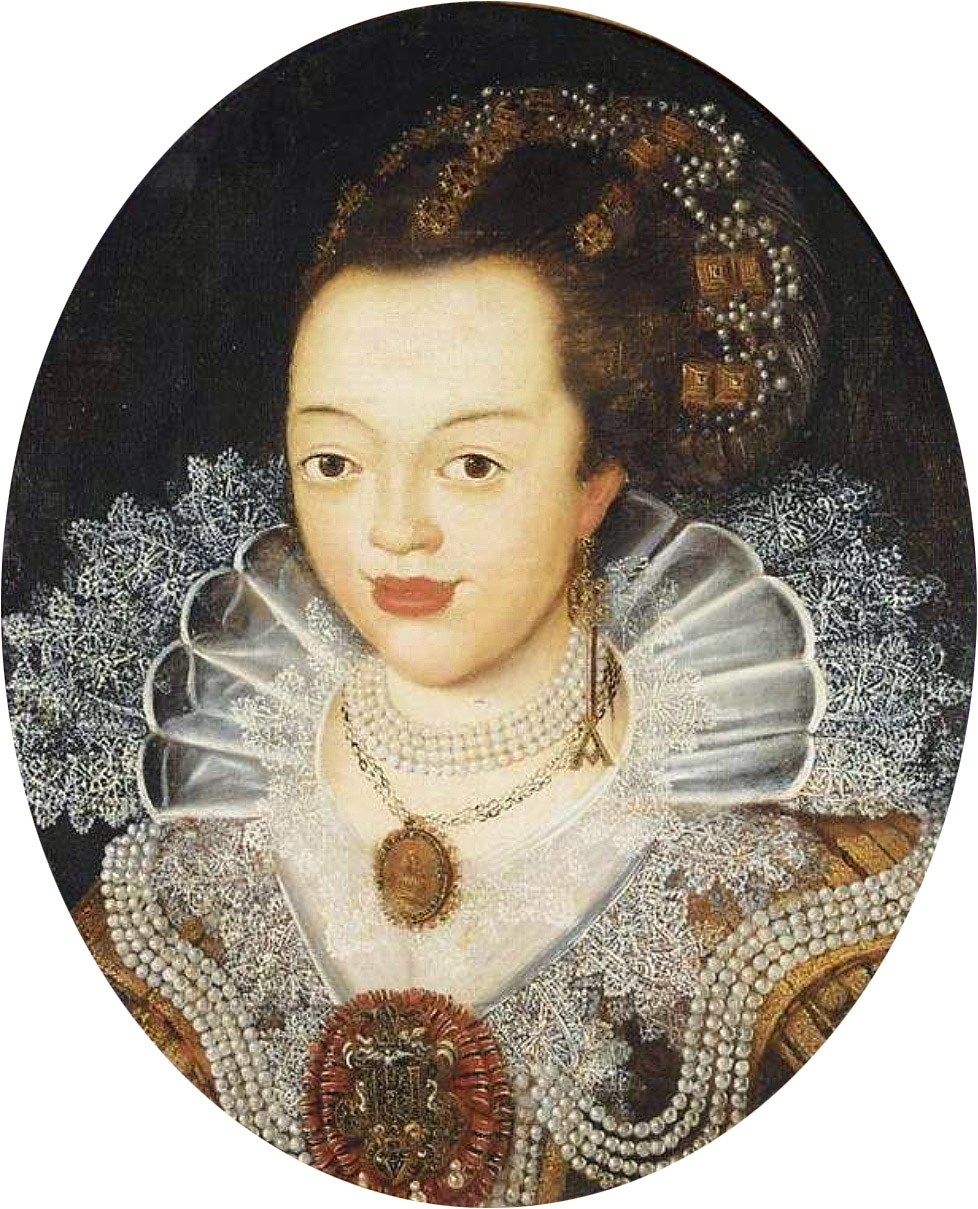
- 17th-century portrait
- Born: 25 September 1607; Zerbst
- Died: 26 September 1634 (aged 27); Hitzacker
- Spouse: Augustus the Younger, Duke of Brunswick-Wolfenbüttel
- Issue: Henry August; Rudolph August; Sibylle Ursula; Klara Auguste; Anton Ulrich
- Father: Rudolph, Prince of Anhalt-Zerbst
- Mother: Dorothea Hedwig of Brunswick-Wolfenbüttel

Dorothea von Anhalt-Zerbst (25 September 1607, Zerbst – 26 September 1634, Hitzacker) was a member of the House of Askanier and a princess of Anhalt-Zerbst and Duchess of Brunswick-Wolfenbüttel by marriage to Augustus the Younger.

== Life ==
Dorothea was the daughter of Prince Rudolf of Anhalt-Zerbst from his first marriage to Dorothea Hedwig, daughter of the Duke Henry Julius of Brunswick-Wolfenbüttel.

On 26 October 1623 she married in Zerbst with Duke August the Younger of Brunswick-Wolfenbüttel. This was August's second marriage. His first marriage had remained childless, like that of his brother Julius Ernest. With the birth of her sons, Dorothea thus became the ancestress of the "New House of Brunswick", which became extinct in 1873. The family tree of the Duchess, as of 1617, can still be found in the library in Wolfenbüttel.

== Offspring ==
From her marriage with Augustus, Dorothy had the following children:

- Henry August (1625–1627)
- Rudolph August (1627–1704), Duke of Brunswick-Lüneburg and Duke of Brunswick-Wolfenbüttel

married firstly, in 1650 Countess Christiane Elisabeth of Barby (1634-1681)
married secondly, in 1681 Rosine Elisabeth Menthe (1663-1701)

- Sibylle Ursula (1629–1671)

married in 1663 Duke Christian of Schleswig-Holstein-Glücksburg (1627-1698, son of Philip, Duke of Schleswig-Holstein-Sonderburg-Glücksburg)

- Klara Auguste (1632–1700)

married in 1653 Duke Frederick of Württemberg-Neuenstadt (1615-1682)

- Anton Ulrich (1633–1714), Duke of Brunswick-Wolfenbüttel

married in 1656 princess Elisabeth Juliane of Schleswig-Holstein-Norburg (1634-1704)

== See also ==
- Anhalt
- Askanier
