= Conrad Buno =

German copperplate engraver, cartographer and publisher

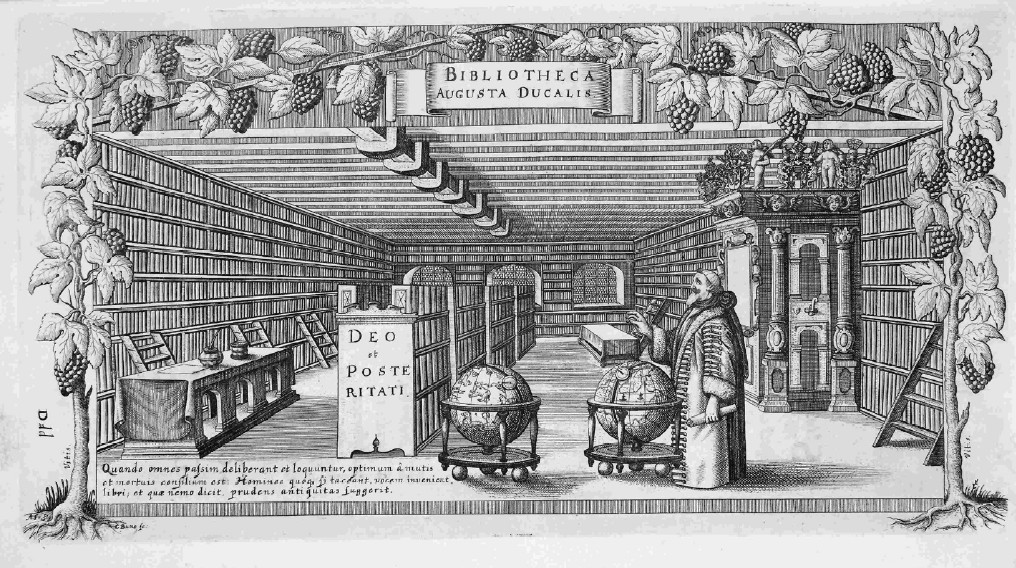
Augustus the Younger, Duke of Brunswick-Lüneburg in his library (1650) by Conrad Buno

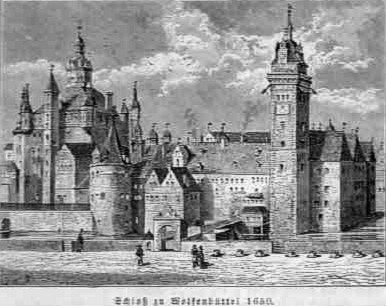
Schloss Wolfenbüttel 1650 engraving after Conrad Buno

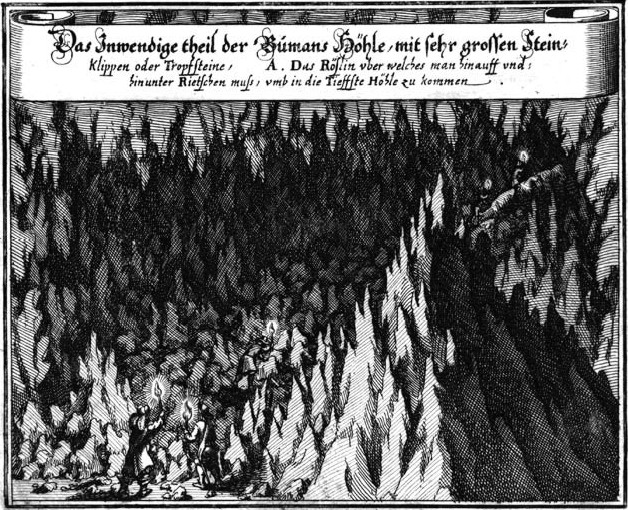
Baumann's Cave by Conrad Buno

Conrad Buno (c. 1613–1671), was a German copperplate engraver, cartographer and publisher at the court of Wolfenbüttel (Guelpherbytum) and brother of Johann Buno (1617–1697), the theologian and pedagogue from Lüneburg.

Conrad Buno prepared a set of maps for the 1641 Brunswick-Lüneburg edition of Philipp Cluver's famous Introductio in Universam Geographicam, an atlas with maps of Africa, America, Asia and the World, and text written by Johann Buno.
