= Augustus II of Brunswick =

Duke of Brunswick-Lüneburg (1579–1666)

Augustus the Younger
- Duke of Brunswick-Lüneburg
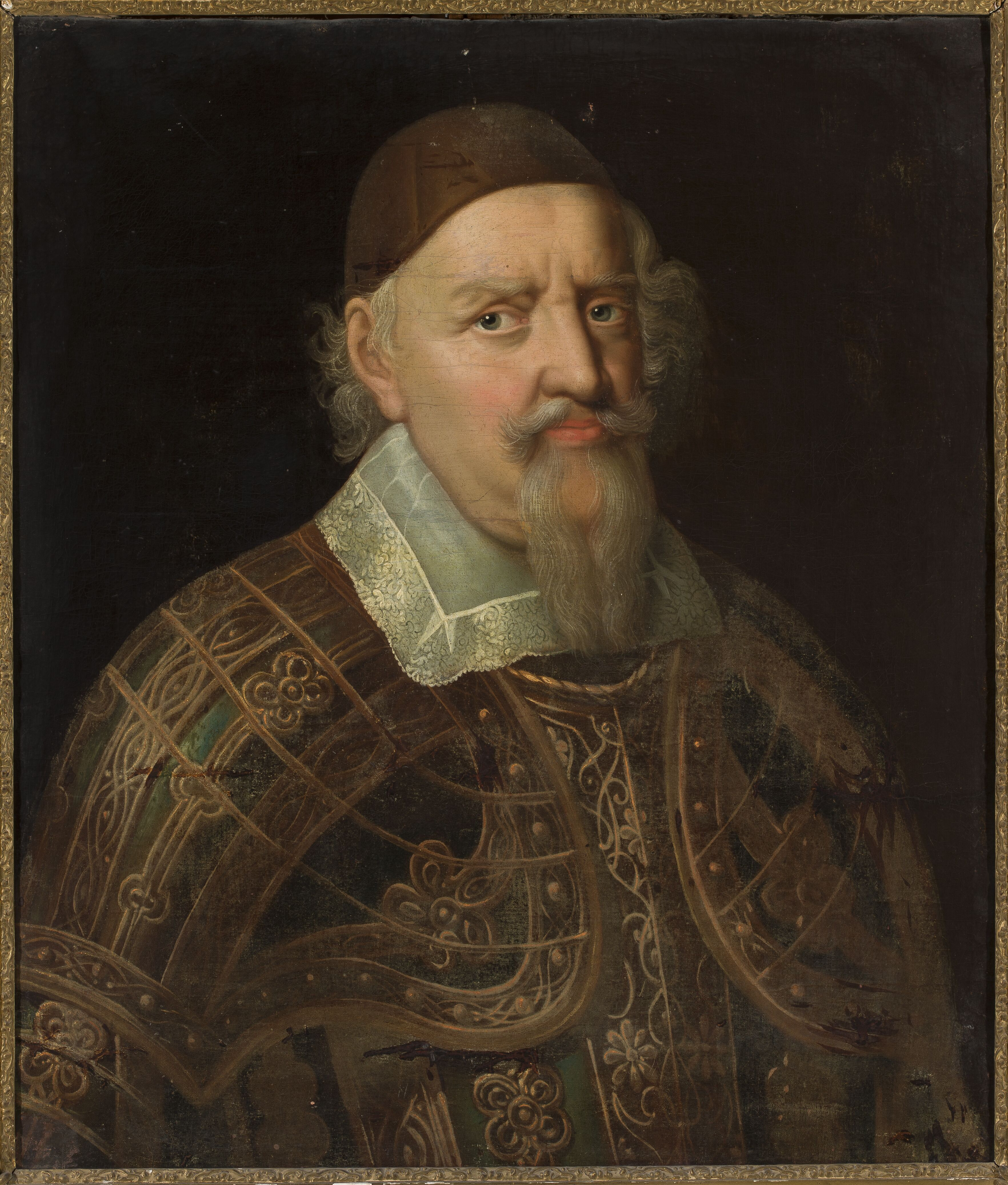
- Portrait by Anselm van Hulle, 1652

Prince of Brunswick-Wolfenbüttel
- Reign: 11 August 1634 – 17 September 1666
- Predecessor: Frederick Ulrich
- Successor: Rudolph Augustus
- Born: 10 April 1579; Dannenberg, Principality of Lüneburg, Brunswick-Lüneburg
- Died: 17 September 1666 (aged 87); Wolfenbüttel, Principality of Brunswick-Wolfenbüttel, Brunswick-Lüneburg
- Spouse: Clara Maria of Pomerania-Barth; Dorothea of Anhalt-Zerbst; Elisabeth Sophie of Mecklenburg
- Issue: Henry August; Rudolph August; Sibylle Ursula; Klara Auguste; Anton Ulrich; Ferdinand Albert I Marie Elisabeth
- House: House of Welf
- Father: Henry, Duke of Brunswick-Lüneburg
- Mother: Ursula of Saxe-Lauenburg

Augustus II (10 April 1579 – 17 September 1666), called the Younger (German: August der Jüngere), a member of the House of Welf was Duke of Brunswick-Lüneburg. In the estate division of the House of Welf of 1635, he received the Principality of Wolfenbüttel which he ruled until his death. Considered one of the most literate princes of his time, he is known for founding the Herzog August Library at his Wolfenbüttel residence, then the largest collection of books and manuscripts north of the Alps.

== Life ==
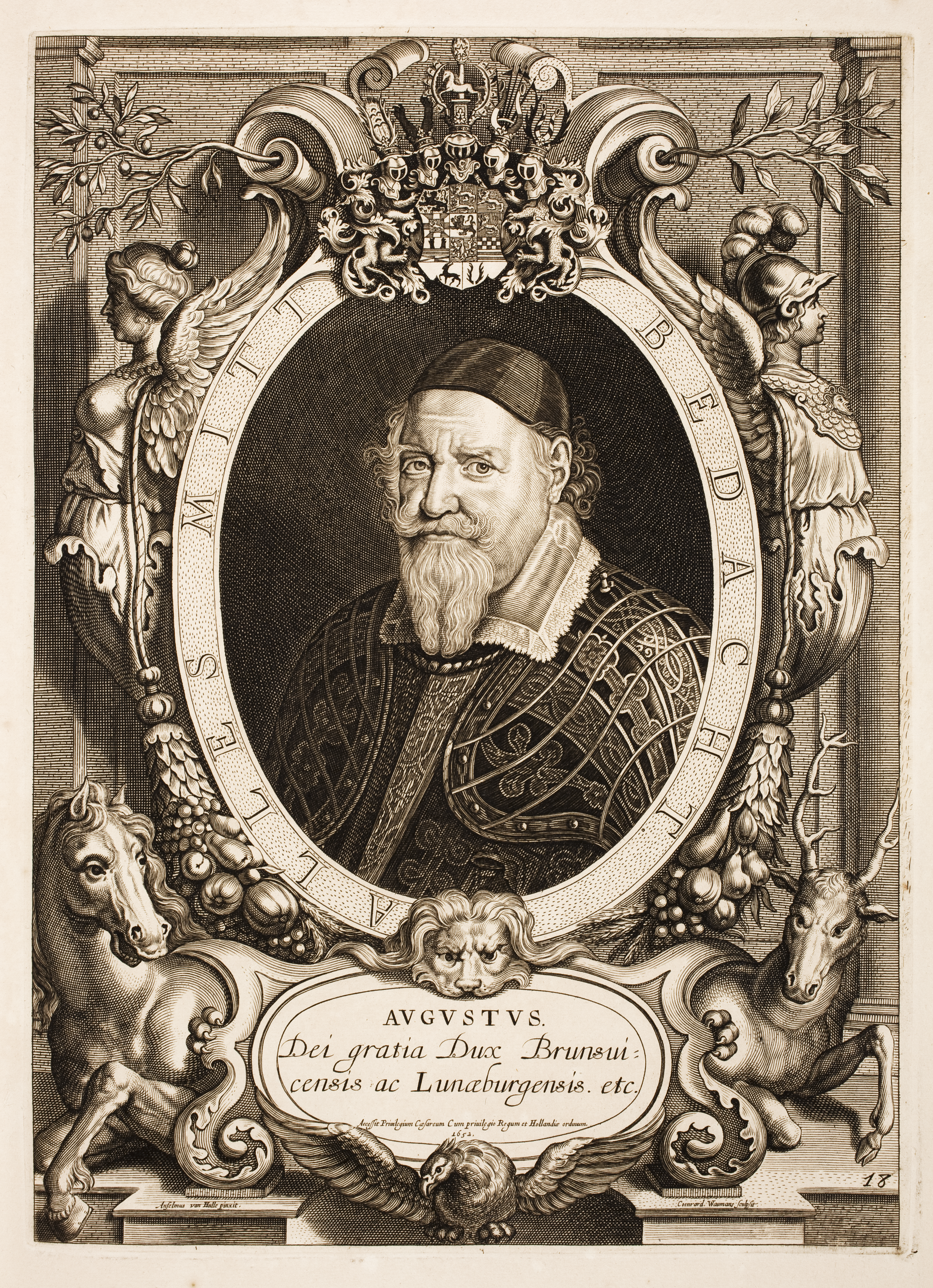
August von Brunswick-Lüneburg, engraving after Anselm van Hulle (1717)

Augustus was born at Dannenberg Castle, the seventh child of Duke Henry of Brunswick-Lüneburg. His father had ruled over the Brunswick Principality of Lüneburg, jointly with his younger brother William, since 1559. Ten years later, however, upon his marriage with Ursula, a daughter of the Ascanian duke Francis I of Saxe-Lauenburg, he had to waive all rights and claims and was compensated with the small Dannenberg lordship. Moreover, he received an annual payment and had reserved the inheritance right of his descendants should the Brunswick-Wolfenbüttel line become extinct.

Augustus, as the seventh and youngest child, had little chance to take up any rule in the Brunswick lands. He concentrated on his studies in Rostock, Tübingen, and Straßburg. Afterwards, he travelled on a Grand Tour through Italy, France, the Netherlands, and England. Back in Germany at the age of 25, he took his residence in Hitzacker, where he spent the next three decades with a small court, continuing his studies.

Succession arose in the midst of the Thirty Years' War, when the last Wolfenbüttel prince, Duke Frederick Ulrich of Brunswick-Lüneburg died without heirs in 1634. After lengthy and complicated negotiations with his reluctant Welf relatives and an intervention by Emperor Ferdinand II, it was finally agreed that Augustus should inherit the Wolfenbüttel principality. Because of the ongoing war, he had to stay at Dankwarderode Castle in Braunschweig and could not move to his residence until 1644. Soon after, Augustus instituted a number of government reforms, and founded the Bibliotheca Augusta (now the Herzog August Bibliothek). After the 1648 Peace of Westphalia, the Wolfenbüttel lands recovered quickly under his capable rule.

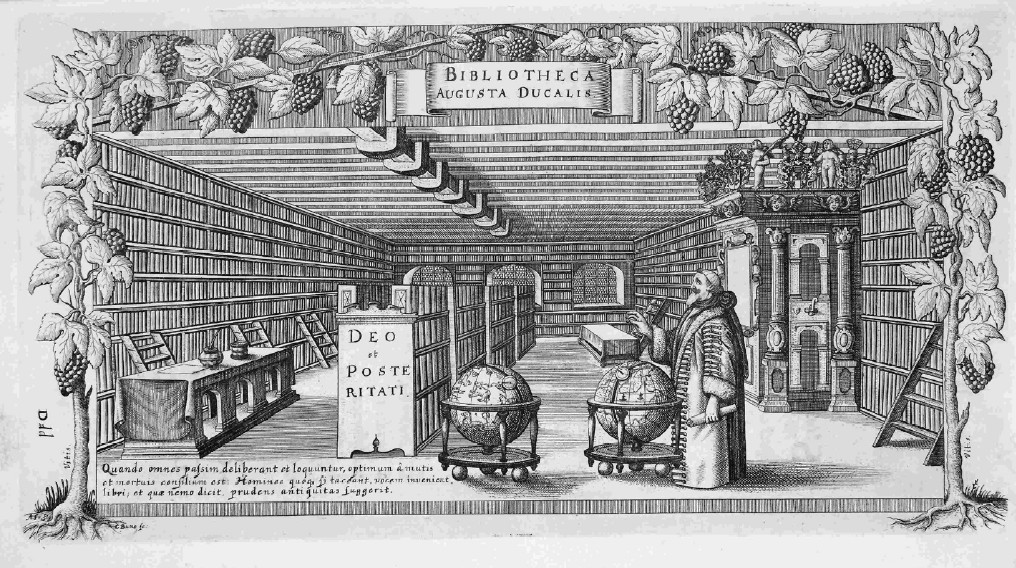
Augustus in his library, engraving by Conrad Buno, about 1650

Augustus was a promoter of German as language of literature. Under the pseudonym Gustavus Selenus, he translated a book on rithmomachia by the mathematician Francesco Barozzi, wrote a book on chess in 1616, Chess or the King's Game, and a standard reference on cryptography in 1624: Cryptomenytices et Cryptographiae libri IX (Gustavi Seleni). The pseudonym itself is a cryptic reference to his name, Gustavus anagrams (with U=V) to Augustus, the surname is a play on the Greek goddess of the moon (Selene). The book on cryptography is largely based on earlier works by Johannes Trithemius and also describes the work of Abramo Colorni.

The duke employed the scholar Justus Georg Schottel as tutor of his sons; he also kept an active correspondence with Johannes Valentinus Andreae, a founder of the esoteric Rosicrucianism movement. In 1632 he met with Prince Louis I of Anhalt-Köthen and joined his Fruitbearing Society.

Augustus died at Wolfenbüttel and was succeeded by his eldest son Rudolph Augustus.

== Marriage and children ==
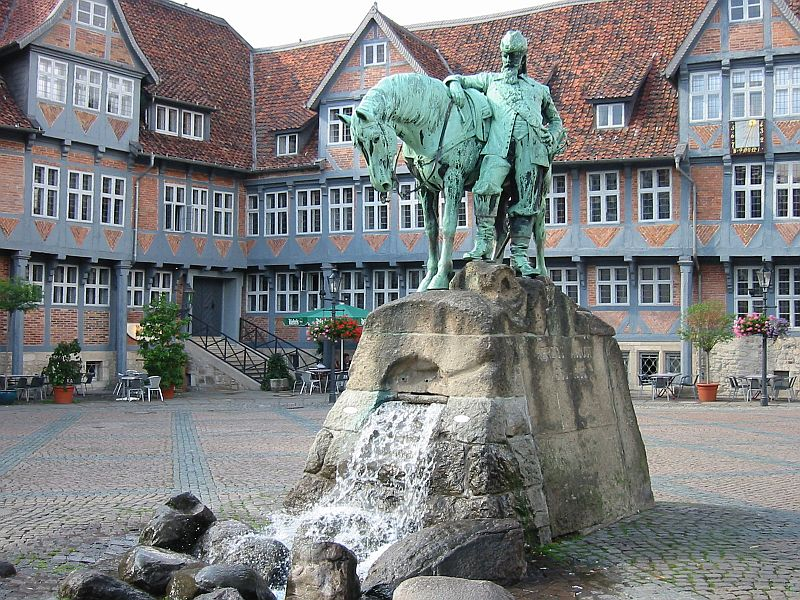
Statue of Duke Augustus on the Wolfenbüttel market square

In December 1607 he married Clara Maria of Pomerania-Barth, the eldest daughter of the Griffin duke Bogislaw XIII of Pomerania. The marriage produced two stillborn children. Clara Maria died in February 1623.

In October 1623 Augustus married Dorothea of Anhalt-Zerbst, daughter of the Ascanian prince Rudolph of Anhalt-Zerbst. They had the following children:

- Heinrich August (13 September 1625 – 19 February 1627) died in early childhood.
- Rudolph Augustus (1627–1704), Duke of Brunswick-Lüneburg and Duke of Brunswick-Wolfenbüttel, married firstly, in 1650 Countess Christiane Elisabeth of Barby (1634-1681), married secondly, in 1681 Rosine Elisabeth Menthe (1663-1701)
- Sibylle Ursula (1629–1671), married in 1663 Duke Christian of Schleswig-Holstein-Glücksburg (1627-1698, son of Philip, Duke of Schleswig-Holstein-Sonderburg-Glücksburg)
- Klara Auguste (25 June 1632 – 6 October 1700), married in 1653 Duke Frederick of Württemberg-Neuenstadt (1615-1682)
- Anton Ulrich (1633–1714), Duke of Brunswick-Wolfenbüttel, married in 1656 princess Elisabeth Juliane of Schleswig-Holstein-Norburg (1634-1704).

Dorothea died in September 1634 and in 1635 Augustus married Duchess Elisabeth Sophie of Mecklenburg, daughter of Duke John Albert II of Mecklenburg. They had two surviving children:

- Ferdinand Albert I (1636-1687), Duke of Brunswick-Lüneburg, married in 1667 Christine of Hesse-Eschwege (1649-1702)
- Marie Elisabeth (1638-1687), married firstly, in 1663 Adolf William, Duke of Saxe-Eisenach, married secondly, in 1676 Albert V, Duke of Saxe-Coburg.

== Ancestors ==
Ancestors of Augustus II of Brunswick

8. Henry I of Lüneburg
4. Ernest I, Duke of Brunswick-Lüneburg
9. Margarete of Saxony
2. Henry III, Duke of Brunswick-Lüneburg
10. Henry V, Duke of Mecklenburg-Schwerin
5. Sophia of Mecklenburg-Schwerin
11. Ursula of Brandenburg
1. Augustus the Younger, Duke of Brunswick-Wolfenbüttel
12. Magnus I, Duke of Saxe-Lauenburg
6. Francis I, Duke of Saxe-Lauenburg
13. Catherine of Brunswick-Wolfenbüttel
3. Ursula of Saxe-Lauenburg
14. Henry IV, Duke of Saxony
7. Sybille of Saxony
15. Catherine of Mecklenburg

== Bibliography ==
- Bazzarini, Antonio (1834). Ortografia Enciclopedica Universale Della Lingua Italiana: PO - R; Con Appendice. 2,6 : Dizionario Enciclopedico Delle Scienze, Lettere Ed Arti (in Italian). Bazzarini, Antonio.
- Ward, A.W.; Prothero, G.W.; Leathes, Stanley, eds. (1934). The Cambridge Modern History. Vol. XIII. Cambridge at the University Press.

Augustus II of Brunswick House of Welf Cadet branch of the House of Este Born: 10 April 1579 Died: 17 September 1666
Regnal titles
Preceded by Frederick Ulrich	Duke of Brunswick-Lüneburg; Prince of Brunswick-Wolfenbüttel; 1635–1666	Succeeded by Rudolph Augustus
