= Hitzacker Archaeological Centre =

Archaeological open-air museum

Coordinates: 53°08′49″N 11°02′50″E

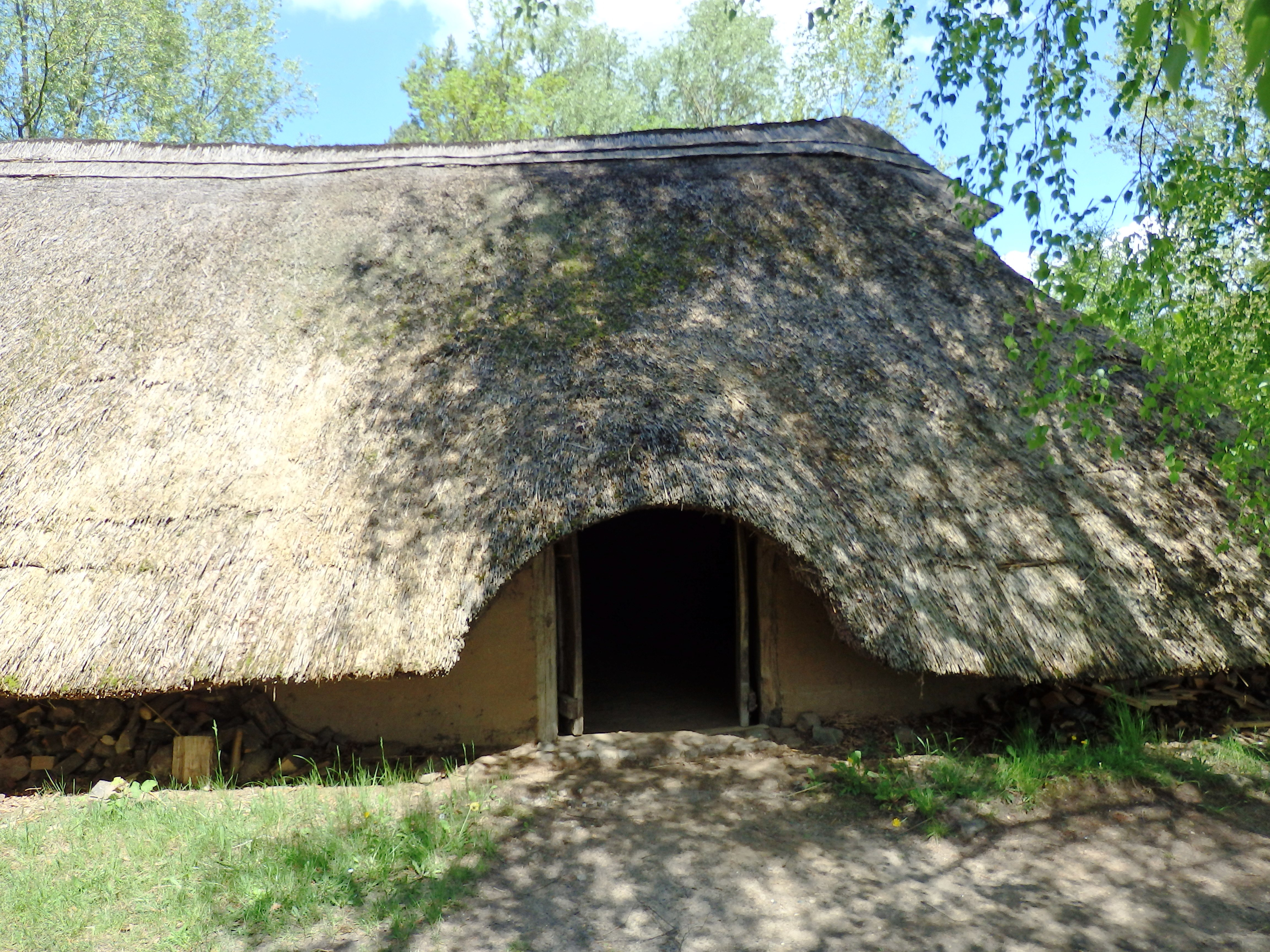
Hitzacker

The Hitzacker Archaeological Centre (German: Archäologisches Zentrum Hitzacker) is an archaeological open-air museum in Hitzacker in the German state of Lower Saxony. The core theme of the museum is the presentation of Bronze Age settlements.

The museum has three reconstructed single-room houses (Wohnstallhäuser) or longhouses (Langhäuser) that combine livestock stalls and living accommodation under one roof, a burial hut (Totenhütte) and a pit-house (Grubenhaus), as they would have looked based on local archaeological finds. The longhouses have been further enhanced by various, everyday household and handiwork items. One of the longhouses contains an exhibition of the important aspects of life in the Bronze Age some 3,000 years ago. The museum gives visitors a diverse range of historical activities such as bronze casting, bread baking, Feuerschlagen, spinning and weaving as well as modern activities to participate in and try out.

In 1969 the first archaeological discoveries of ceramic shards and building floor plans were made during building work at Lake Hitzacker (Hitzacker See). Not until 1987 were planned archaeological digs carried out on the area, because the expansion of the lake and upgrade of a federal road endangered the cultural monuments. The following years yielded further finds and floor plans. In 1990 the Hitzacker Archaeological Centre was founded due to the importance of these discoveries. The museum is sponsored by the Lüchow-Dannenberg District Archaeological Society (Kreisarchäologie Lüchow-Dannenberg) and the Society for the Hitzacker Archaeological Centre (Förderverein Archäologisches Zentrum Hitzacker e.V.).

The open-air museum is a place recognised by the town of Hitzacker for registry office weddings that are accompanied by a supporting programme by the museum.

== Sources ==
- Arne Lucke: Zeitpfade - Mensch, Umwelt, Technik vor 3000 Jahren. Archäologisches Zentrum Hitzacker, Hitzacker 2002

== See also ==
- List of open-air museums in Germany
