= Christoph Bernhard Francke =

German painter

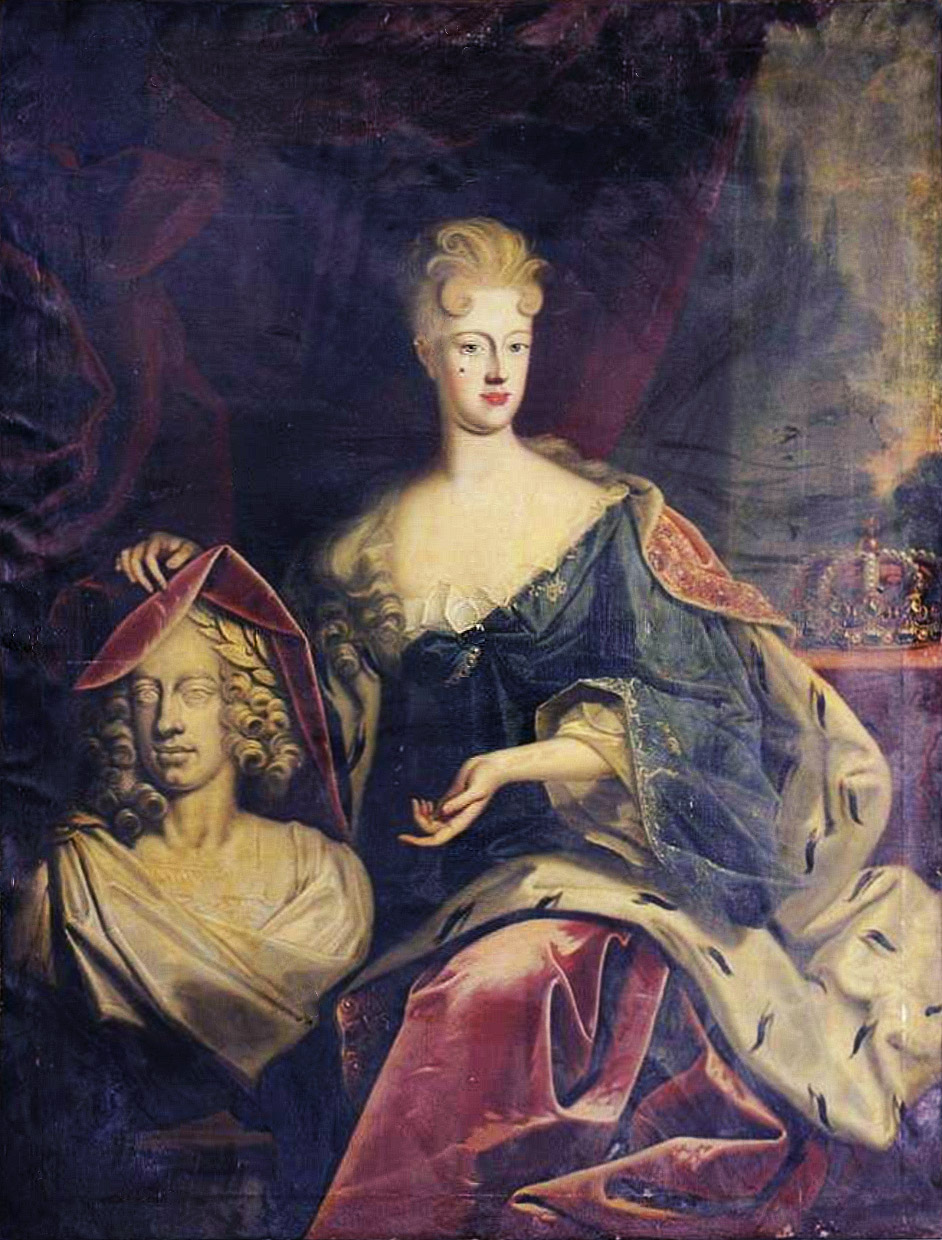
The future empress, Elisabeth Christine

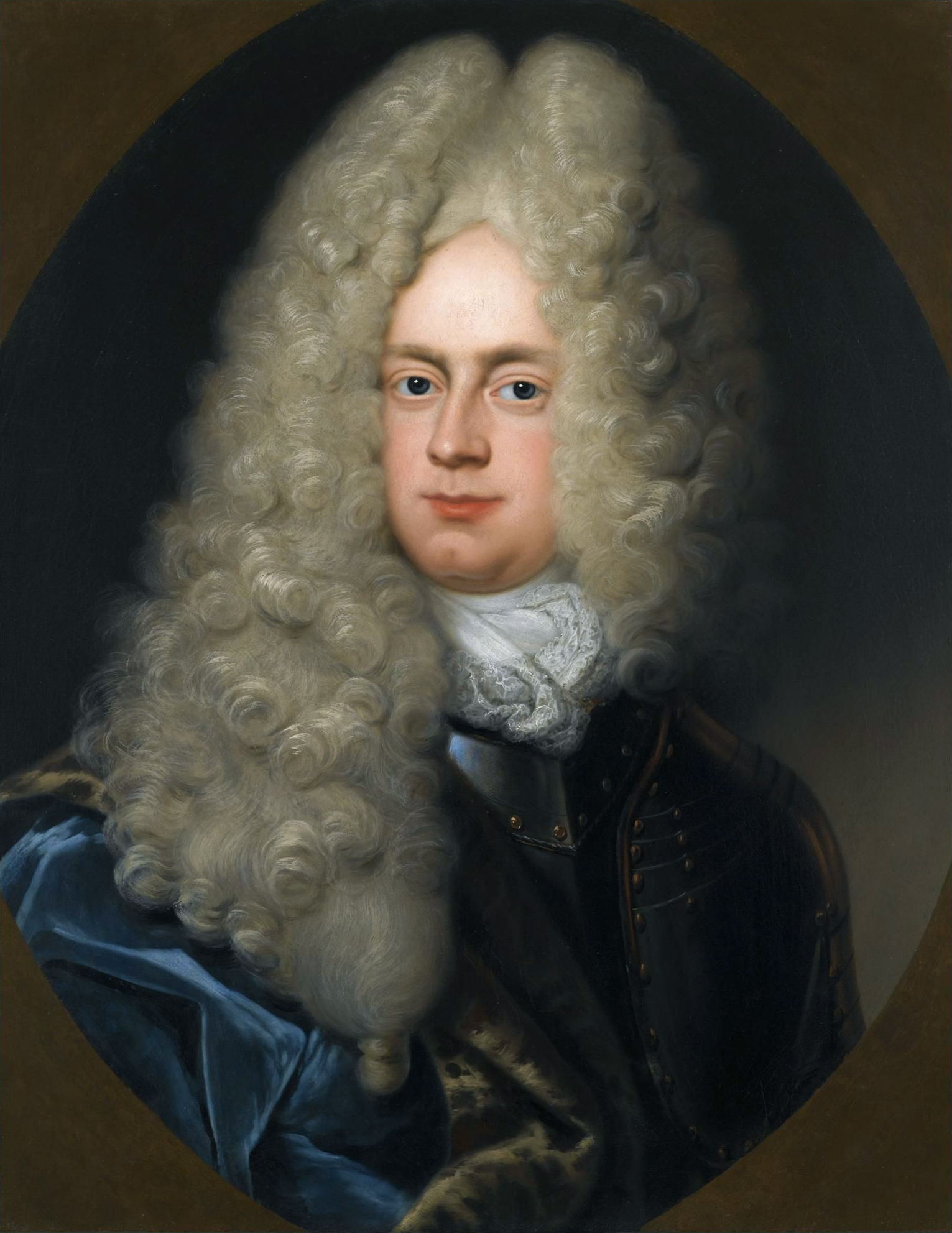
August Ferdinand von Braunschweig-Bevern (1677-1704)

Christoph Bernhard Francke, also known as Bernhard Christoph Francken (c. 1660-1670 in Hanover – 18 January 1729 in Braunschweig), was a German military officer and painter in the Baroque style.

== Biography ==
Little is known about his early life. He apparently received his artistic training in Italy. In 1693, he became a Leutnant in the service of Duke Rudolf Augustus of Braunschweig-Wolfenbüttel, but appears to have served primarily as a court painter. His only known military activity came during a campaign against Hanover in 1702.

In 1699, he married Agnesa Duve (1680−1727), daughter of Achatius Duve (1644−1698), pastor of the Aegidienkirche. In 1700, Rosine Elisabeth Menthe, the Duke's morganatic wife, became their first child's godmother. In 1715, the new Duke, Augustus William became godfather to their son. That same year, he received an official appointment as "Fürstlichen Kunst- und Porträtmaler".

His surviving portraits almost all depict members of the ruling family in Braunschweig-Wolfenbüttel and their relatives. A portrait of the Tsarevich Alexei, who had married Princess Charlotte, is one of his few portrayals of people outside the direct family lineage. His best-known painting, however, is of the philosopher Gottfried Wilhelm Leibniz, who was attached to the court in Braunschweig. It is currently in the Herzog Anton Ulrich Museum in Braunschweig in Lower Saxony.
