= Hitzacker =

- Town
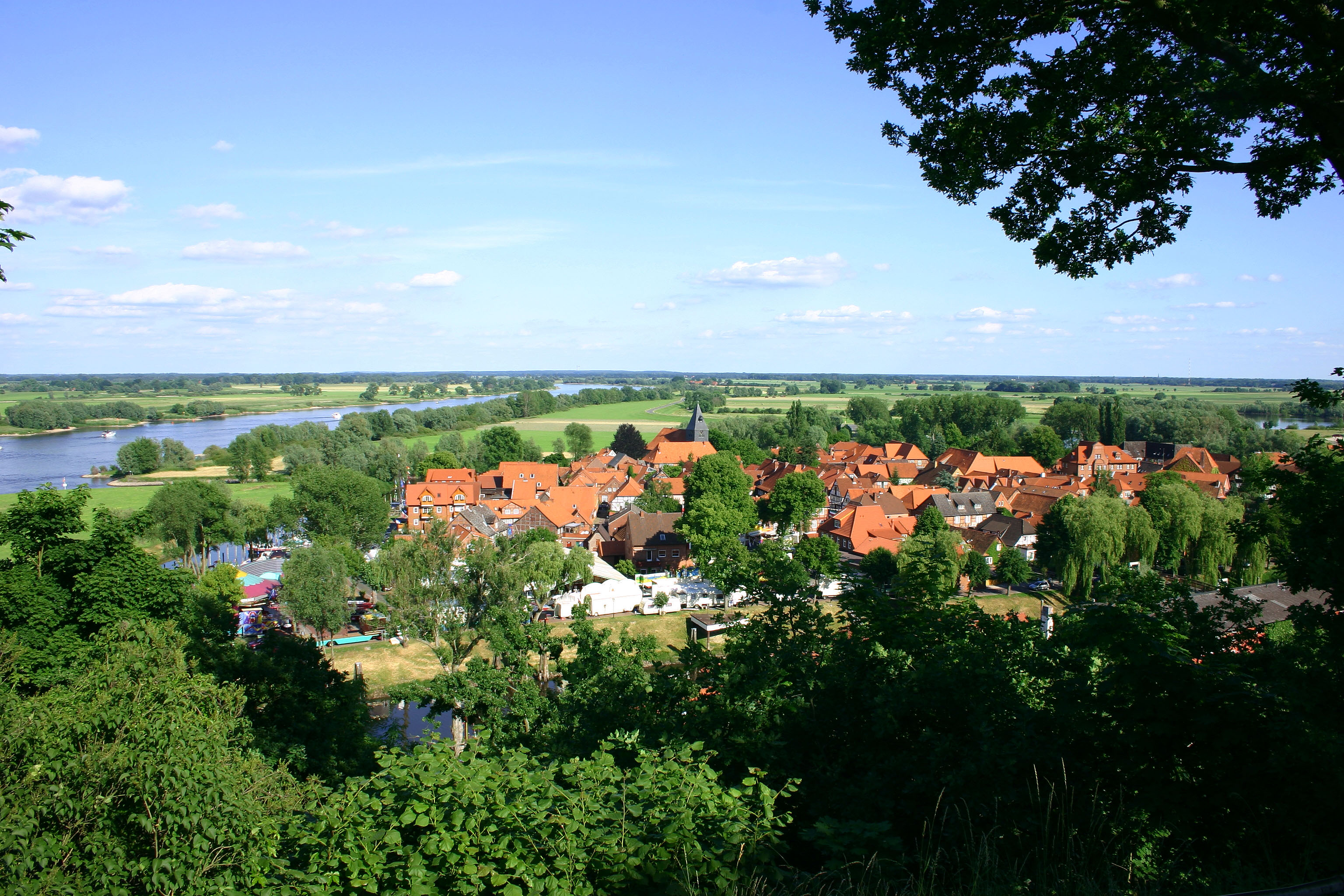
- View from the Weinberg over the old town

- Coat of arms

- Location of Hitzacker within Lüchow-Dannenberg district
- Interactive map of Hitzacker
- Location within Germany Location within Lower Saxony
- Coordinates: 53°8′N 11°3′E
- Country: Germany
- State: Lower Saxony
- District: Lüchow-Dannenberg
- Municipal assoc.: Elbtalaue
- Subdivisions: 12 parishes

Government
  - Mayor: Holger Mertins (FDP)

Area
  - Total: 58.67 km^{2} (22.65 sq mi)
- Elevation: 12 m (39 ft)

Population (2025-12-31)
  - Total: 4,566
  - Density: 77.83/km^{2} (201.6/sq mi)
- Time zone: UTC+01:00 (CET)
  - Summer (DST): UTC+02:00 (CEST)
- Postal codes: 29456
- Dialling codes: 05862, 05858 (OT Pussade), 05861 (OT Kähmen)
- Vehicle registration: DAN
- Website: www.hitzacker.de

Hitzacker (German pronunciation: [ˈhɪtsˌʔakɐ]; Polabian: Ľautťüv) is a town in the Lüchow-Dannenberg district of Lower Saxony, Germany. It is situated on the river Elbe, approx. 8 km north of Dannenberg, and 45 km east of Lüneburg. The 2007 population of Hitzacker was 4,982, and its postal code is 29456. The mayor is Holger Mertins. The town is located on the German Timber-Frame Road and is part of the Samtgemeinde ("collective municipality") of Elbtalaue.

The famous library now in Wolfenbüttel was founded here by Augustus the Younger, Duke of Brunswick-Lüneburg (who died in 1666) and was moved to its present location in 1643.

== Geography ==
=== Location ===
Hitzacker is situated at the confluence of the River Jeetzel with the Elbe. While the so-called Elbe Heights (Elbhöhen, also Klötzie), at the southeastern foot of which Hitzacker lies, belong to the natural region of the Lüneburg Heath (cf. the Drawehn), the lowland areas of the old town belong to the Elbe valley water meadows (Elbtalaue).

Its height varies from 11 m above NN at the Jeetzel confluence to 83 m above NN on the hill of Weinberg in the Klötzie. Further down the Elbe, the hill of Kniepenberg near Drethem attains 86 m above NN and offers a panoramic view over the Elbe valley depression.

== Town divisions ==
Since the municipal reform of 1972, the borough of Hitzacker has consisted of the town itself and the 11 villages listed below.

- Bahrendorf
- Grabau
- Harlingen
- Hitzacker
- Kähmen
- Nienwedel
- Pussade
- Seerau
- Tießau
- Tiesmesland
- Wietzetze
- Wussegel

Other settlements in the borough are:

- Dötzingen, manor
- Hagen, manor
- Leitstade
- Marwedel
- Meudelfitz, manor
- Meudelfitz, settlement
- Posade, forest house (Forsthaus)
- Sarchem
- Schmessau
- Schmardau

Before 1972, Pussade and Posade Forsthaus belonged to the municipality of Harlingen, Dötzingen Manor, Hagen Manor, Marwedel, Meudelfitz Manor, Meudelfitz and Sarchem to the town of Hitzacker and Leitstade to Wietzetze. The manors of Dötzingen, Hagen and Marwedel are located today within the town of Hitzacker.

== History ==
Man had already settled by around 3000 B.C. at the lake of Hitzackersee and the region has been continuously settled for over three thousand years.

On the Weinberg next to the present old town (Altstadt) Slavs built a castle in the eighth century. As a result, Hitzacker became an important trading centre even before its receiving town rights. Its actual foundation as a town took place in 1258, whereupon the castle lost its significance and was allowed to fall into ruins.

A manuscript referring to Hitzacker dating to 20 January 1376 states the following:

"The dukes, Wenceslas and Albert of Saxony and Lüneburg and Duke Bernard of Brunswick of Lüneburg allow the council of the town of Lüneburg to add the 30 marks of the lot which Lord Ludolf von Tzellenstede undertook to pay on the town's behalf on 13 April next, and the 150 marks of the lot which he also agreed to pay on the following 25 December, as well as the 100 marks of the lot the council paid on behalf of Lords Ordenberg and Siegfried Bock, i.e. 280 marks of the lot and the interest due to be added to the pledge for the castles of Bleckede and Hitzacker and the taxes from Lüneburg and Hitzacker, in the event that the lords do not repay the council on the said days, and vow also not to relieve the council from the pledges before they have repaid the sum pledged and the above money."

In 1548, on the Friday after Jubilate Sunday, a conflagration reduced the village of Hitzacker to ashes apart from the church and one house.

In 1610 a number of people in Hitzacker and the surrounding area were accused of witchcraft and sorcery.

On the third day of Christmas in 1668 the church, vicarage and eight houses burned down.

In the Polabian ("Wendish") language of the region that died out in the 18th century Hitzacker was called Ľautťüv (Lgautztgi).

The borough of Hitzacker was created as part of the municipal reform in 1972 from ten hitherto independent parishes.

== Politics ==
The town of Hitzacker belongs to state constituency No. 48 – Elbe and federal constituency No. 38 – Lüchow-Dannenberg – Lüneburg.

=== Council ===
The town council of Hitzacker has 17 councillors.

	CDU	SPD	FDP	Initiativ für Hitzacker / INI	Total
2006	5	5	4	3	17 seats

as at: local elections of 10 September 2006

=== Mayor ===
The Mayor (Bürgermeister) of Hitzacker is Holger Mertins.

=== Partnerships ===
The town used to be partnered with the municipality of Wisch in the Netherlands.

== Culture and places of interest ==
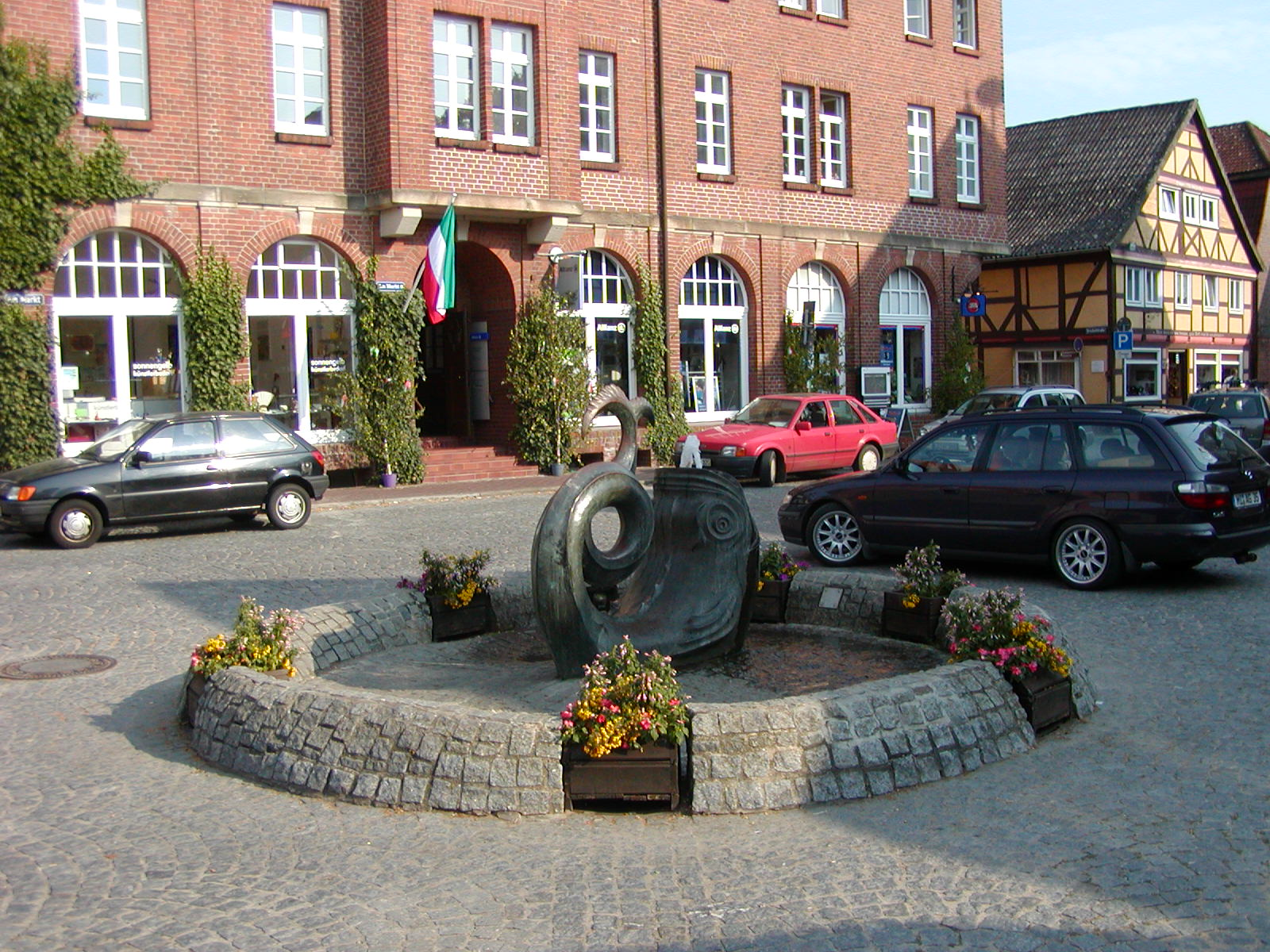
The market place in Hitzacker

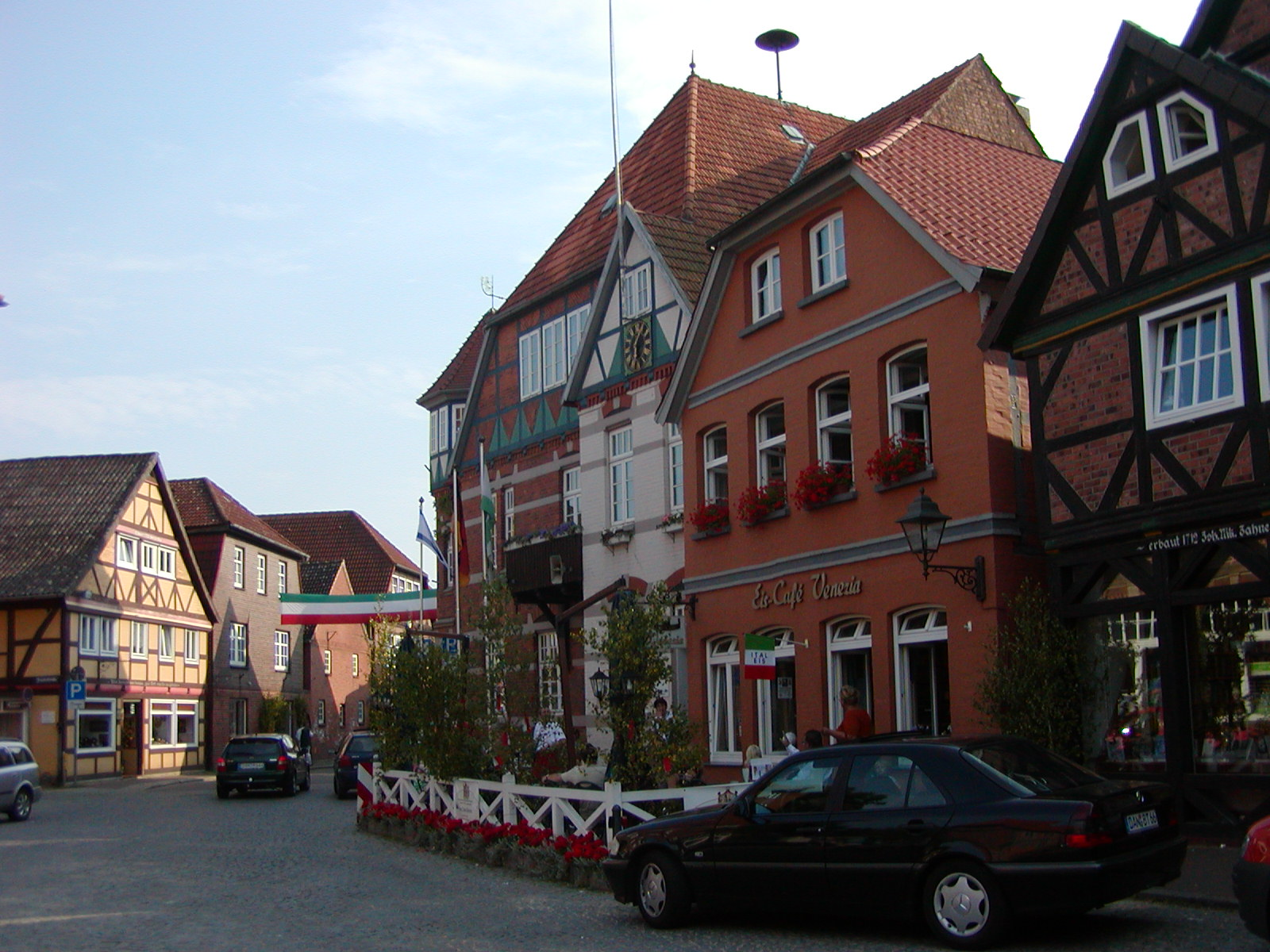
Am Markt in Hitzacker

- Town roundabout with timber-framed houses and the 1589 customs house (Zollhaus)

=== Museums ===
- Hitzacker Archaeological Centre
- The Old Customs House Museum (Das Alte Zollhaus)
- Hunting Lodge and Forest Museum in Göhrde

=== Buildings ===
- Katemin Mill (Kateminer Mühle)

=== Other ===
- Excavations at the Hitzacker See
- Sacrifice stone (Opferstein) near Pudripp
- Wildlife enclosure (Wildgehege) in Hitzacker
- Prince's Graves (Fürstengräber), Marwedel
- Megalithic tombs and tumuli near Pussade
- The Wirtschaftliche Forschungsgesellschaft or Wifo: former Nazi underground fuel depot in the Dötzingen Forest outside Hitzacker
- Hitzacker's shooting guild, the 'Schützengilde von 1395 zu Hitzacker (Elbe), is one of the oldest in Europe.

== Economy and infrastructure ==
=== Tourism ===
Hitzacker has a long tradition as a tourist destination. For instance, the Local History Working Group of Lüchow-Dannenberg (Heimatkundliche Arbeitskreis Lüchow-Dannenberg or HALD) held a conference in 1983 with the title "100 Years of Tourism in Hitzacker – 50 Year Old Local History and Museum Society". Around the turn of the century, holidaymakers from the Hamburg and Hanover regions came to the spa hotel on the Weinberg hill. The hotel had its own spring used as a drinking fountain and for bathing by those taking the Kur. Day excursions on the river, along the Elbe, took place, and it had its own shipping line: Hamburg-Lauenburg-Dömitz. Today tourism has experienced a change. The health business has been replaced by "wellness" and beauty facilities. Hitzacker has since become a recognised climatic spa. Many of its hotels offer so-called wellness treatments and there is a spa area with a Kneipp basin and barefoot path. Hitzacker is the venue for musical events like the Hitzacker Summer Music Days (Sommerliche Musiktage Hitzacker) under the artistic direction of Dr. Markus Fein, and Hitzacker Music Week (Musikwoche Hitzacker) under the direction of Ludwig Güttler. There are three museums, including the Archaeological Centre with a Bronze Age open-air museum. On the Weinberg, vines have been cultivated for several centuries, and once a year the vintage is celebrated by the officiating wine queen. Hitzacker takes part in various marketing initiatives; for example the town is on the German Timber-Frame Road, the Lower Saxon Asparagus Road and a partner in the German-Dutch Orange Route.

=== Transport ===
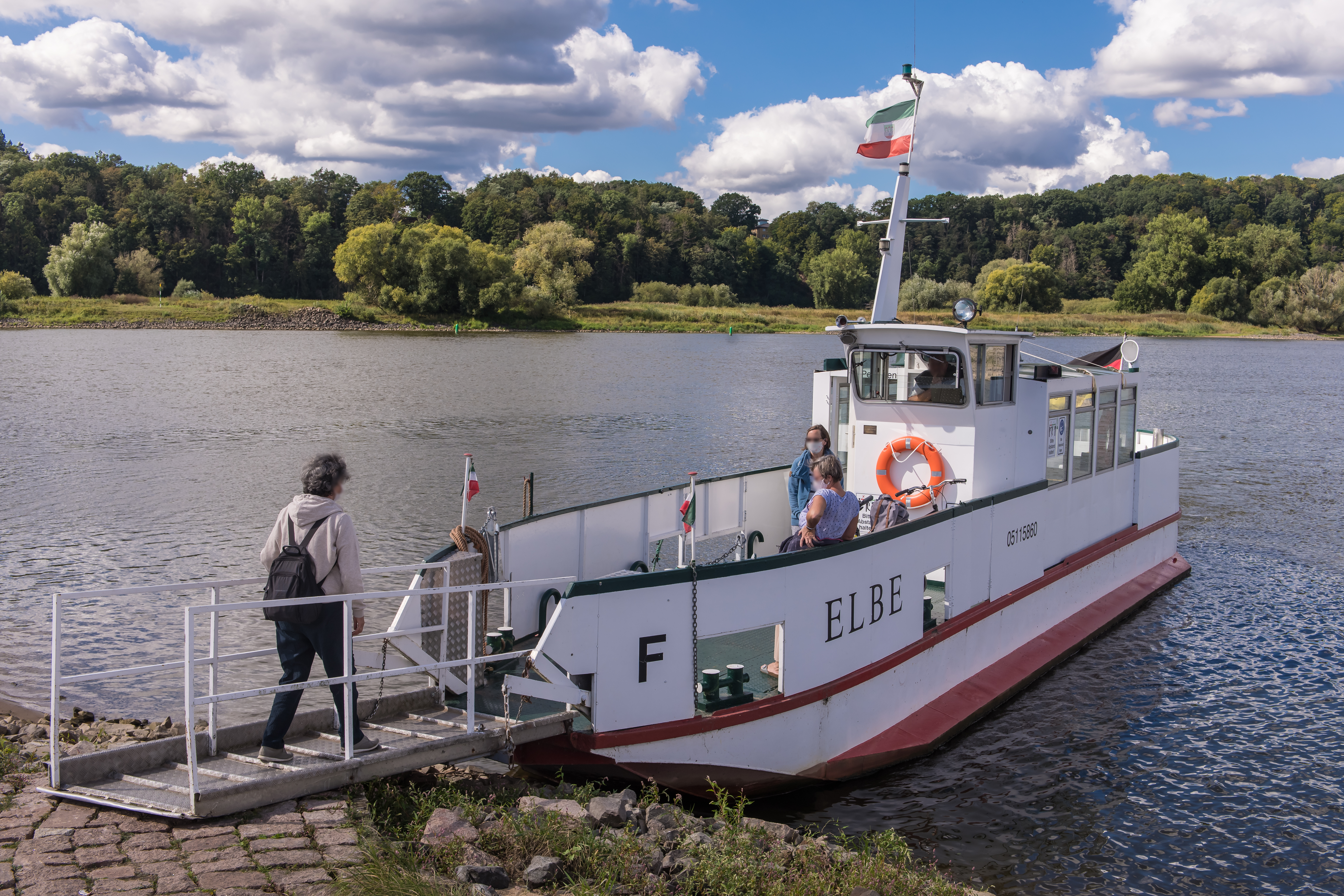
Passenger ferry Hitzacker - Bitter

Hitzacker has a railway link to Dannenberg and Lüneburg on the Wendland Railway. Another station on the same line is located in the local village of Leitstade. There are bus links to Lüneburg, Uelzen and Dannenberg as well as the county town of Lüchow. In Hitzacker there is a passenger ferry over the Elbe.

=== Education ===
There are three schools in Hitzacker:

- Hitzacker Primary School
- Bernhard Varenius School
- Hitzacker Free School

== Notable townsfolk ==
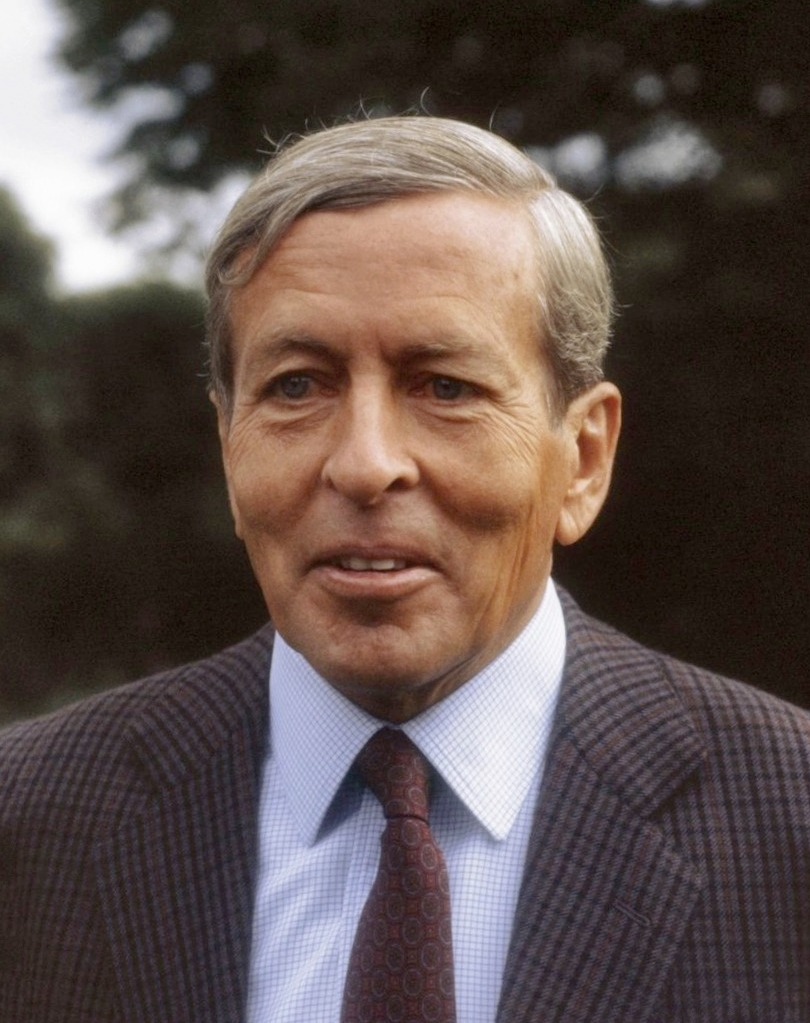
Prince Claus of the Netherlands, 1986

- Bernhard Varenius (1622–1650), physician and geographer.
- Ferdinand Wohltmann, (DE Wiki) (1857–1919), agronomist
- Hans Georg Ahrens, (DE Wiki) (born 1944), German opera singer
- Rudi Müller-Glöge, (DE Wiki) (born 1951), German lawyer and vice-president of the Federal Labour Court

=== Aristocracy ===
- Augustus II, Duke of Brunswick (1579–1666), Duke of Brunswick-Lüneburg, lived locally age 25 to age 87
- Rudolph Augustus, Duke of Braunschweig-Wolfenbüttel (1627–1704), Duke of Brunswick-Lüneburg
- Sibylle Ursula von Braunschweig-Lüneburg (1629–1671), member of the House of Welf, a translator and writer.
- Anthony Ulrich, Duke of Brunswick (1633–1714), Duke of Brunswick-Lüneburg, writer and art lover
- Baroness Gösta von dem Bussche-Haddenhausen (1902–1996), mother of Prince Claus, moved back to Dötzingen in 1963.
- Prince Claus of the Netherlands (1926–2002), German diplomat and Prince of the Netherlands

== Sources ==
- Berndt Wachter: "Die Fortführung der Grabung auf dem Weinberg bei Hitzacker (Elbe) im Jahr 1971". In: NNU 41 (1972), p. 227 ff.
- Berndt Wachter: "Eine slawische Wallanlage – Die Grabung auf dem Weinberg in Hitzacker (Elbe) im Jahre 1972". In: NNU 42 (1973), p. 300 ff.
