= Sigmund von Birken =

German poet

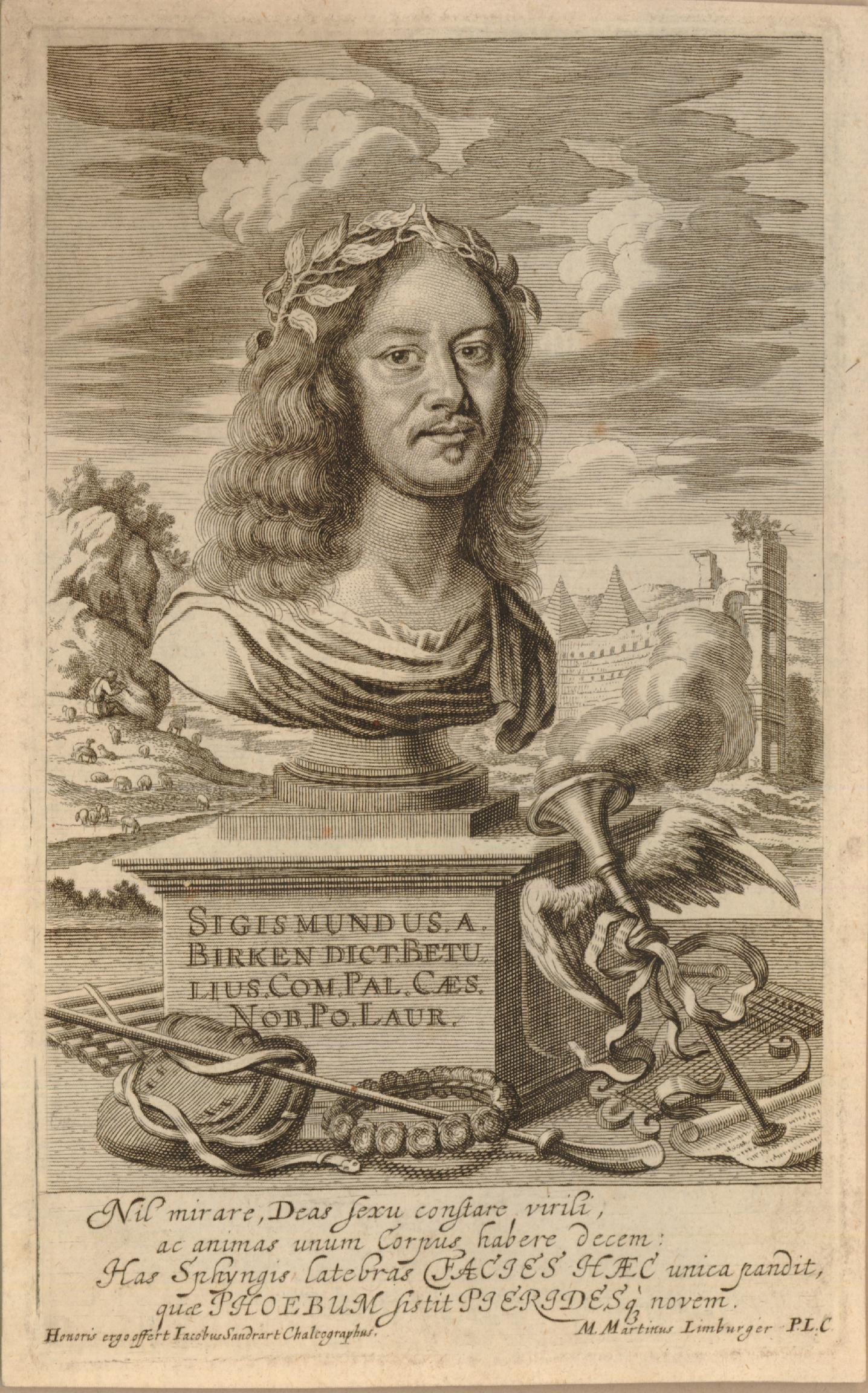
Portrait of Sigmund von Birken, engraving by Jacob von Sandrart

Sigmund von Birken (25 April 1626 – 12 June 1681) was a German poet of the Baroque. He was born in Wildstein, near Eger, and died in Nuremberg, aged 55.

His pupil, Sibylle Ursula von Braunschweig-Lüneburg wrote part of a novel, Die Durchlauchtige Syrerin Aramena (Aramena, the noble Syrian lady), which when complete would be the most famous courtly novel in German Baroque literature; it was finished by her brother Anton Ulrich and edited by Sigmund von Birken.
