= Rudolph Augustus, Duke of Braunschweig-Wolfenbüttel =

Duke of Brunswick-Lüneburg (1627–1704)

Rudolph Augustus
- Duke of Brunswick-Lüneburg
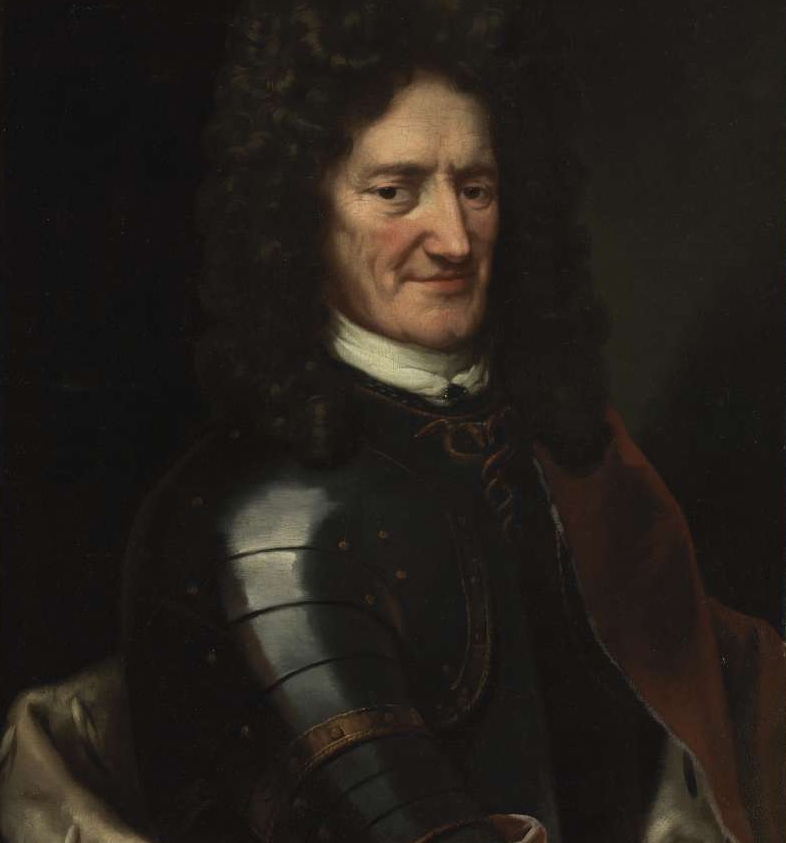
- Portrait by Hans Hinrich Rundt, c. 1700

Prince of Brunswick-Wolfenbüttel
- Reign: 17 September 1666 – 26 January 1704
- Predecessor: Augustus II
- Successor: Anthony Ulrich
- Born: 16 May 1627; Hitzacker, Principality of Lüneburg
- Died: 26 January 1704 (aged 76); Hedwigsburg (now part of Kissenbrück), Principality of Brunswick-Wolfenbüttel
- Spouse: Christine Elizabeth of Barby-Mühlingen
- House: House of Welf
- Father: Augustus the Younger, Duke of Brunswick-Lüneburg
- Mother: Dorothea of Anhalt-Zerbst

Rudolph Augustus (16 May 1627 – 26 January 1704), a member of the House of Welf, was Duke of Brunswick-Lüneburg and ruled as Prince of Brunswick-Wolfenbüttel from 1666 until his death. In 1685 he made his younger brother Anthony Ulrich co-ruler.

== Life ==
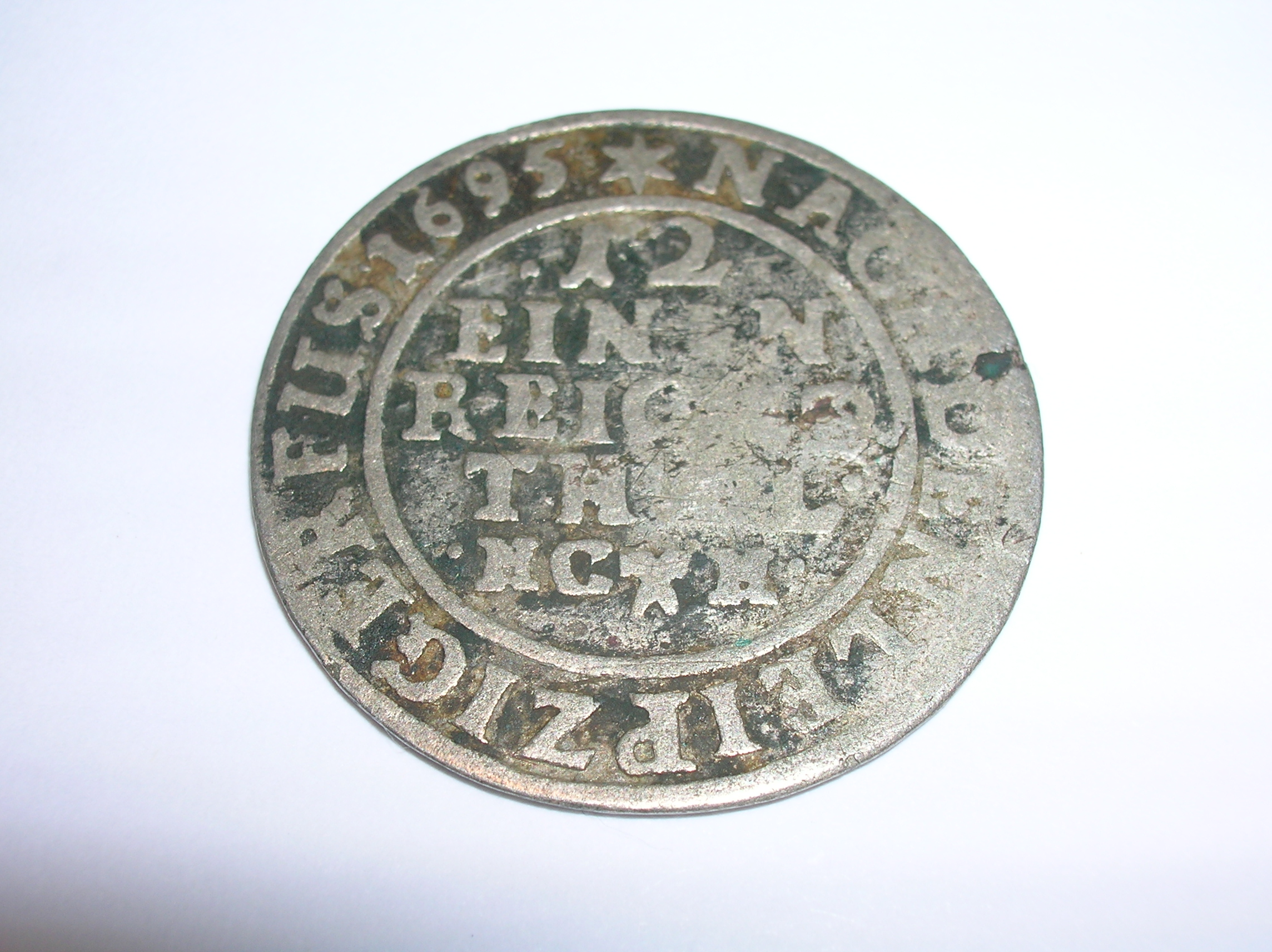
Reverse of a one-twelfth thaler coin of Rudolph Augustus

He was born in Hitzacker, then the residence of his father Duke Augustus the Younger of Brunswick-Lüneburg and his second wife Princess Dorothea of Anhalt-Zerbst. His father assumed the rule in the Principality of Brunswick-Wolfenbüttel, after his Welf cousin Duke Frederick Ulrich had died childless in 1634.

Rudolph Augustus succeeded his father as ruling Prince of Brunswick-Wolfenbüttel in 1666. More interested in his studies and hunting, he soon after appointed his politically astute younger brother Anthony Ulrich governor. In 1671 both besieged and finally occupied the city of Braunschweig, ending about 250 years of local autonomy.

During his reign, Rudolph Augustus concentrated on the Baroque expansion of his ducal residence, including the Alter Weg ("Old Way"), a road connecting the cities of Brunswick and Wolfenbüttel. He died in 1704 at the Hedwigsburg hunting lodge.

== Marriage and issue ==
In 1650 Rudolph Augustus married Christine Elizabeth (1634–1681), daughter of Count Albert Frederick of Barby and Mühlingen. They had three daughters:

- Dorothea Sophia (2 April 1653 – 21 March 1722), married Duke John Adolphus of Schleswig-Holstein-Sonderburg-Plön
- Christine Sophia (2 April 1654 – 26 April 1695), married her cousin Duke Augustus William of Brunswick-Lüneburg, the son of Duke Anthony Ulrich who succeeded his father as Prince of Brunswick-Wolfenbüttel in 1714.
- Eleonore Sophia (26 November 1655– 29 September 1656), died in infancy.

Upon the death of his first wife, Rudolph Augustus entered into a morganatic marriage with Rosine Elisabeth Menthe (1663–1701), which remained childless.

== Ancestry ==
Ancestors of Rudolph Augustus, Duke of Braunschweig-Wolfenbüttel

8. Ernest I, Duke of Brunswick-Lüneburg
4. Henry III, Duke of Brunswick-Lüneburg
9. Sophia of Mecklenburg-Schwerin
2. Augustus the Younger, Duke of Brunswick-Wolfenbüttel
10. Francis I, Duke of Saxe-Lauenburg
5. Ursula of Saxe-Lauenburg
11. Sybille of Saxony
1. Rudolph Augustus, Duke of Brunswick-Lüneburg
12. Joachim Ernest, Prince of Anhalt
6. Rudolph, Prince of Anhalt-Zerbst
13. Eleonore of Württemberg
3. Dorothea of Anhalt-Zerbst
14. Henry Julius, Duke of Brunswick-Wolfenbüttel
7. Dorothea Hedwig of Brunswick-Wolfenbüttel
15. Dorothea of Saxony

Rudolph Augustus, Duke of Braunschweig-Wolfenbüttel House of Welf Cadet branch of the House of Este Born: 16 May 1627 in Hitzacker Died: 26 January 1704 in Hedwigsburg
Regnal titles
Preceded by Augustus	Duke of Brunswick-Lüneburg; Prince of Brunswick-Wolfenbüttel with his brother Anthony Ulrich between 1685 and 1702; 1666–1704	Succeeded by Anthony Ulrich
