= Rosine Elisabeth Menthe =

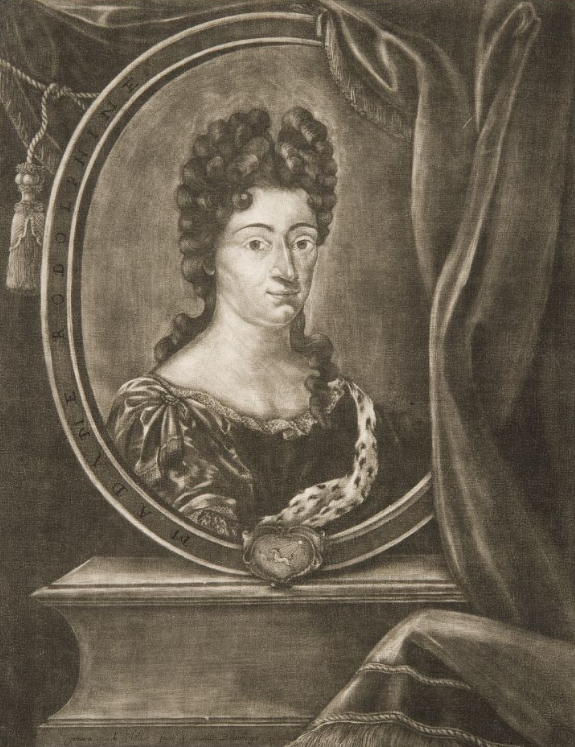
- Rosine Elisabeth Menthe, 1686
- Born: 17 May 1663; Brunswick
- Died: 20 May 1701 (aged 38); Brunswick
- Noble family: House of Guelph
- Spouse: Rudolph Augustus, Duke of Brunswick-Wolfenbüttel

Rosine Elisabeth Menthe (nicknamed: Madame Rudolphine; 17 May 1663, in Brunswick – 20 May 1701, in Brunswick, Germany), was married morganatically with Duke Rudolph Augustus of Brunswick-Wolfenbüttel (1627–1704), Duke of Brunswick-Lüneburg and Prince of Brunswick-Wolfenbüttel.

== Life ==
Rosine Elisabeth was born the daughter of a barber and surgeon from Brunswick, Franz Joachim Menthe. In 1681 she married Rudolf August (1627–1704), the Duke of Brunswick-Wolfenbüttel. Rudolph Augustus had been married in his first marriage with the Countess Christiane Elisabeth of Barby (1634–1681); she had died on 2 May 1681. On 7 June or 7 July 1681, the Duke married Rosine, who had just turned eighteen. They married in Hedwigsburg, near Wolffenbüttel. The Duke's younger brother Anthony Ulrich and his Chancellor Philipp Ludwig Probst von Wendhausen were present.

She did not receive a title during her twenty-year marriage to the duke; she was simply called Madame Rudolphine. We find this name in a letter from Electress Sophia of Hannover to Gottfried Wilhelm Leibniz of 18 August 1700. Children from this marriage would, according to an agreement Duke Rudloph Augustus made with his brother and co-ruler Anthony Ulrich, not receive a title either, but would receive "maintenance appropriate for a noble person". The marriage, however, remained childless.

In 1695, the Duke ordered his royal architect Hermann Korb to expand the Wasserburg castle at Vechelde near Brunswick into the royal Vechelde Palace. They would use the Madamenweg, which was named after her, to travel to Vechelde Palace from the Gray Court in downtown Brunswick.

Elisabeth Rosine Menthe died in 1701 at the Gray Court in Brunswick.

== References and sources ==
- Elisabeth E. Kwan, Anna E. Röhrig: Frauen vom Hof der Welfen, Verlag Matrixmedia, Göttingen, 2006, ISBN 978-3-932313-17-2
- Paul Zimmermann (1889). "Rudolf August" . Allgemeine Deutsche Biographie (in German). Vol. 29. Leipzig: Duncker & Humblot. pp. 525–529.
- Carl Eduard Vehse: Geschichte der Höfe des Hauses Braunschweig, part 5: Die Hofhaltungen zu Hannover, London und Braunschweig, Verlag Hoffmann und Campe, Hamburg, 1853
- Johann Stephan Pütter: Über Mißheirathen teutscher Fürsten und Grafen, Verlag Vandenhoeck und Ruprecht, Göttingen, 1796.
