= Duchess Elisabeth Sophie of Mecklenburg =

German poet, composer and impresario (1613–1676)

Elisabeth Sophie of Mecklenburg
- Duchess of Brunswick-Lüneburg
- 17th-century portrait
- Born: 20 August 1613; Güstrow
- Died: 12 July 1676 (aged 62)
- Spouse: Augustus the Younger, Duke of Brunswick-Wolfenbüttel (m. 1635; died 1666)
- Issue: Ferdinand Albert I Marie Elisabeth
- House: House of Mecklenburg
- Father: John Albert II, Duke of Mecklenburg
- Mother: Margaret Elisabeth of Mecklenburg

Elisabeth Sophie of Mecklenburg, Duchess of Brunswick-Lüneburg (20 August 1613 – 12 July 1676) was a German poet, composer and impresario.

== Life ==
She began studying music at the court of her father, Duke John Albert II of Mecklenburg-Güstrow, where was an orchestra known for its use of fine English musicians, such as William Brade. She moved to the court of Kassel, which also had a strong musical tradition, when the Thirty Years War threatened her court in 1628. In 1635, she married the learned Augustus the Younger, Duke of Brunswick-Lüneburg with whom she had two children:

- Ferdinand Albert I, Duke of Brunswick-Lüneburg
- Marie Elisabeth of Brunswick-Wolfenbüttel

Elisabeth Sophie was charged with organizing the court orchestra, and at times worked closely with Heinrich Schütz, who was appointed absentes Kapellmeister in 1655. She may have collaborated with him on arias in his Theatralische neue Vorstellung von der Maria Magdalena.

Most of Elisabeth Sophie's compositions are hymns or devotional arias. Some of these were published in 1651 and 1667. The one printed in 1651, Vinetum evangelicum, Evangelischer Weinberg, is believed to have been the first music published by a woman in Germany. She also played a major role in establishing large court entertainments, including masquerades, plays, and ballets, to which she at times wrote librettos and music. Her additional involvement in these entertainments is unclear. Two of her dramatic works survive: Friedens Sieg (1642, Brunswick) and Glückwünschende Freudensdarstellung (Lüneburg, 1652).

Sibylle Ursula von Braunschweig-Lüneburg was her stepdaughter.
