= Henry, Duke of Brunswick-Dannenberg =

Duke of Brunswick-Lüneburg

Henry
- Duke of Brunswick-Lüneburg

Prince of Lüneburg
- Reign: 1559–1569
- Born: 4 June 1533
- Died: 19 January 1598
- Spouse: Ursula of Saxe-Lauenburg
- Issue: Julius Ernst, Duke of Brunswick-Dannenberg; Augustus the Younger, Duke of Brunswick-Lüneburg
- House: House of Welf
- Father: Ernest I, Duke of Brunswick-Lüneburg
- Mother: Sophia of Mecklenburg-Schwerin

Henry III (1533 – 19 January 1598), a member of the House of Welf, was Duke of Brunswick-Lüneburg and ruling Prince of Lüneburg from 1559 until 1569, jointly with his brother William the Younger. From 1569, he ruled over the Lordship of Dannenberg until his death.

Henry was the second surviving son of Duke Ernest I of Brunswick-Lüneburg and assumed the rule in the Principality of Lüneburg upon the early death of his elder brother Francis Otto in 1559. He and his younger brother William fell out with each other in 1569, when Henry married the Ascanian princess Ursula of Saxe-Lauenburg (1545–1620), daughter of Duke Francis I, and demanded the partition of the Lüneburg lands.

He eventually waived his claims to the Lüneburg principality and received Dannenberg as a paréage as well as an annual payment in compensation. He also ensured that his descendants were entitled to inherit the Brunswick-Wolfenbüttel estates upon the extinction of the line; therefore, his youngest son Augustus could assume the rule in Wolfenbüttel in 1635.

Henry died in Dannenberg.

== Marriage and children who reached adulthood ==
In 1569 Henry married Ursula of Saxe-Lauenburg (*1545 – 22 October 1620*, Schernebeck), daughter of Francis I of Saxe-Lauenburg. They had the following children:

- Julius Ernest (1571–1636)
- Francis (1572–1601) Provost of Strasbourg
- Anne Sophie (1573–1574)
- Heinrich (1574–1575)
- Sybil Elizabeth (1576–1630), married Anthony II, Count of Delmenhorst
- Sidonia (1577–1645)
- Augustus (1579–1666)

His agnatic progeny went extinct in 1884.

== Sources ==
- Ward, A.W.; Prothero, G.W.; Leathes, Stanley, eds. (1934). The Cambridge Modern History. Vol. XIII. Cambridge at the University Press.

Henry, Duke of Brunswick-Dannenberg House of Welf Born: 4 June 1533 Died: 19 January 1598
German nobility
Preceded by Francis Otto	Duke of Brunswick-Lüneburg; Prince of Lüneburg; 1559–1569	Succeeded by William the Younger
