= Eric II of Brunswick-Lüneburg =

Duke of Brunswick-Lüneburg from 1540 to 1584

Eric II
- Prince of Calenberg; Prince of Göttingen
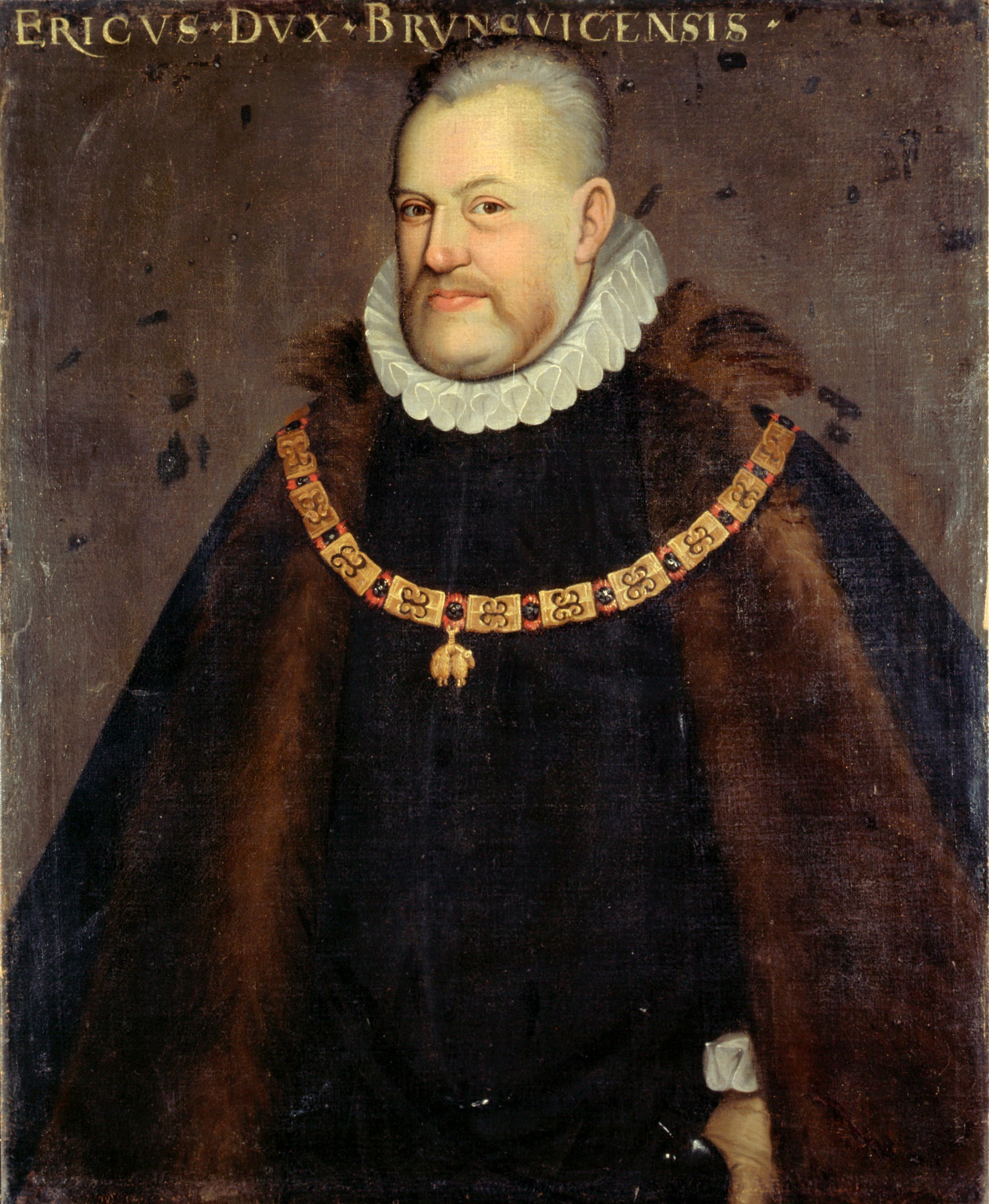
- Portrait by an unknown painter, c. 1573

Duke of Brunswick-Lüneburg
- Reign: 30 July 1540 – 17 November 1584
- Predecessor: Eric I
- Successor: Julius
- Regent: Elisabeth of Brandenburg (1540–1547)
- Born: 10 August 1528
- Died: 17 November 1584 (aged 56)
- Spouse: Sidonie of Saxony (m. 1545; died 1575) Dorothea of Lorraine (m. 1575)
- House: Welf
- Father: Eric I, Duke of Brunswick-Lüneburg
- Mother: Elisabeth of Brandenburg

Eric II, Duke of Brunswick-Lüneburg (10 August 1528 – 17 November 1584) was Duke of Brunswick-Lüneburg and ruler of the Principality of Calenberg from 1540 to 1584. Since 1495 the Principality of Göttingen was incorporated in Calenberg.

He was the son of Eric I and Elisabeth of Brandenburg. While he was still a minor, his mother acted as Regent and introduced the Reformation in Calenberg, including her children's conversion. However, in 1547 Eric II declared his reconversion to Roman Catholicism, to the great concern of his mother.

== First marriage ==
On 17 May 1545, Eric married Sidonie of Saxony (1518–1575), who was ten years his senior. The wedding ceremony was held in Hann. Münden without the usual pomp and circumstance. Initially, they liked each other. Eric had been engaged to Agnes of Hesse. When the marriage was negotiated at the court in Kassel, however, he had met Sidonie. He liked her, and broke off the engagement with Agnes, in order to marry Sidonie. Landgrave Philip I of Hesse predicted: "All sorts of things will happen inside this marriage after the kissing month ends."

Two years into the marriage, in 1547, Duke Eric began his rule and reconverted to the Catholic faith, after the Reformation had been introduced to his Duchy in 1542. Despite her husband's pleas, Sidonie held on to her Lutheran faith. They had financial problems and the marriage remained childless, and soon their relationship took a very unfortunate course.

The clashes culminated in her suspicion that her husband wanted to poison her. A Genoese merchant had contacted Sidonie's brother Augustus in 1555 and informed him that Duke Eric I had ordered poison from him on the grounds that "Eric was a Christian and his wife would be Lutheran, it was better that one woman part was destroyed, than 20,000 people."

Eric turned to a mistress, Katharina von Weldam, with whom he lived at Calenberg Castle from 1563 and had two children: Wilhelm, Baron of Lysfelt (died young in 1585) and Katharina, Baroness of Lysfelt (1564–1606), who married secretly with Giovanni Andrea Doria, Prince of Melfi. Sidonie was refused access to the castle, which was also based on the grounds that she had threatened "if she comes into my house, I'll cut the whore's nose off and poke out an eye."

== Charges of witchcraft ==
Sidonie was from 1564 onwards virtually under house arrest and she protested vigorously to her brother and to the Emperor, who sent councils who tried unsuccessfully to compromise with Duke Eric. In 1564 Eric fell very ill and suspected he was poisoned. Four women suspected of witchcraft were burned as witches in Neustadt am Rübenberge. In 1570 mediation by the Emperor, the Elector of Saxony and Duke Julius of Brunswick-Wolfenbüttel resulted in a settlement of the disputes between Sidonie and her husband, in which Sidonie would receive Calenberg Castle. Eric, however, did not abide by the settlement.

On 30 March 1572, Duke Eric assembled some of his advisers, nobles and deputies of the cities of Hannover and Hameln on Landestrost Castle in Neustadt. He accused Sidonie of witchcraft and of an attempt on his life. He presented evidence obtained by torture from the four women he had executed for witchcraft. Sidonie turned to Emperor Maximilian II and asked for a revision. She secretly left Calenberg and traveled to Vienna. Emperor Maximilian then decreed that the investigation should be carried out at the imperial court. However, he then turned the case over to the Dukes Julius of Brunswick-Wolfenbüttel and William the Younger of Brunswick-Lüneburg.

On 17 December 1573, the case was presented in Halberstadt to the court and a large audience. All witnesses recanted their testimony against Sidonie and on 1 January 1574, the Duchess was acquitted of all charges.

== Weißenfels Monastery ==
From Vienna, Sidonie traveled in October 1572 to Dresden to her brother and his wife. Instead of Calenberg castle and the silver Duke Eric had withheld from her, she received, after several settlements, compensation and a pension for life. Elector Augustus gave her the Poor Clares monastery at Weißenfels with all income and interest. Sidonie lived there until she died in 1575. Due to Sidonie's resistance, Duke Julius of Brunswick did not succeed in amicably resolving Eric's accusation against Sidonie. In 1573, Sidonie wrote to duke Julius: "Duke Eric's difficult because he spewed out accusations, taking, as we speak, not the clothes, but the honor, which is the highest and most precious treasure a poor woman in this world possesses."

== Second marriage ==
In 1575, he married Dorothea of Lorraine (1545–1621), the daughter of Princess Christina of Denmark and Francis I, Duke of Lorraine. He disliked to live in his impoverished principality and continued to travel around with his second wife. In 1581, he bought the sumptuous Ca' Vendramin Calergi in Venice for 50,000 ducats on loan, where he hosted sumptuous dinners for the Venice nobility.

Neither marriage produced legitimate issue, and on his death in Pavia, Italy, the principality of Calenberg-Göttingen reverted to his first cousin once-removed Duke Julius, who was Prince of Wolfenbüttel.

== Footnotes ==
Eric II of Brunswick-Lüneburg House of Welf Cadet branch of the House of Este Born: 10 August 1528 Died: 17 November 1584
Regnal titles
| Preceded by Eric I | Duke of Brunswick-Lüneburg; Prince of Calenberg; 1540–1584 | Succeeded by Julius |
