= Elisabeth of Brandenburg, Duchess of Brunswick-Calenberg-Göttingen =

16th-century German noblewoman

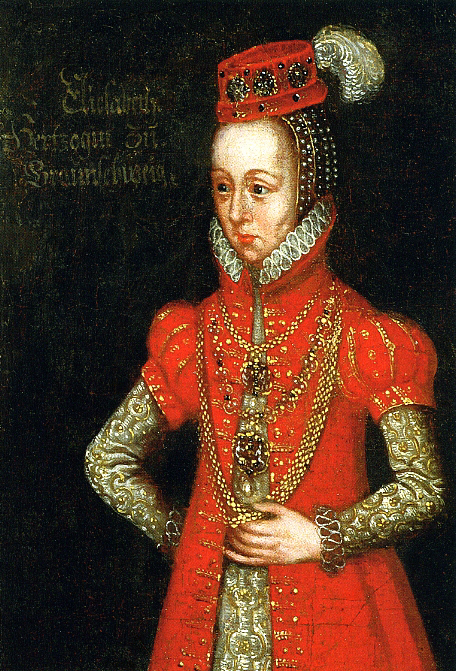
- Elisabeth, woodcut around 1542

Duchess consort of Brunswick-Göttingen-Calenberg
- Tenure: 1525 – 30 July 1540
- Born: 24 August 1510 probably Cölln
- Died: 25 May 1558 (aged 47); Ilmenau
- Buried: St. John's Church in Schleusingen
- Noble family: House of Hohenzollern
- Spouses: Eric I, Duke of Brunswick-Lüneburg; Poppo XII of Henneberg
- Issue: Elisabeth; Eric II; Anna Maria; Katharina
- Father: Joachim I, Elector of Brandenburg
- Mother: Elisabeth of Denmark

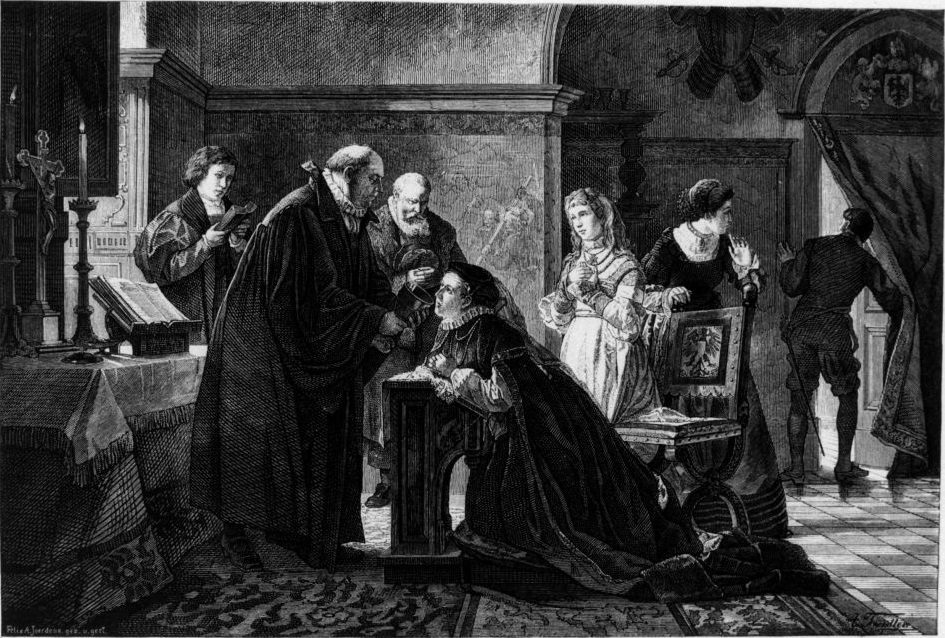
Elisabeth, Elector of Brandenburg, secretly takes communion in both kinds. Wood engraving after a painting by Adolph Treidler (1846-1905), published in: Zeitschrift für bildende Kunst 9 (1874).

Elisabeth of Brandenburg (24 August 1510 – 25 May 1558) was a Duchess consort of Brunswick-Göttingen-Calenberg by marriage to Eric I, Duke of Brunswick-Lüneburg, and Regent of the Duchy of Brunswick-Göttingen-Calenberg during the minority of her son, Eric II, Duke of Brunswick-Lüneburg, from 1540 until 1545. She is considered a "Reformation Princess", who, together with the Hessian reformer Anton Corvinus, helped the Reformation prevail in today's South Lower Saxony.

== Life and work ==
=== Early years (1510–1525) ===
Elisabeth was born, probably in Cölln, the third child and second daughter of the Elector Joachim I of Brandenburg and his wife Elisabeth, daughter of King John I of Denmark. She was educated in a strictly religious and humanist fashion. At the age of not quite 15, she married on 7 July 1525 in Stettin with the forty years old widower Duke Eric I "the Elder" of Brunswick-Göttingen-Calenberg.

She first came into contact with the Reformation in 1527 at her parental court in Brandenburg when her mother celebrated communion under both kinds and thus openly accepted the teachings of Martin Luther. Her father reacted violently, fearing her mother would convert to "Protestantism", and removed the reformers from Wittenberg, who tried to intervene on behalf of the Electress, from his court. This event may well have impressed the seventeen-year-old princess deeply, and reinforced her sympathy for the new faith.

=== Marriage to Eric I (1525–1540) ===
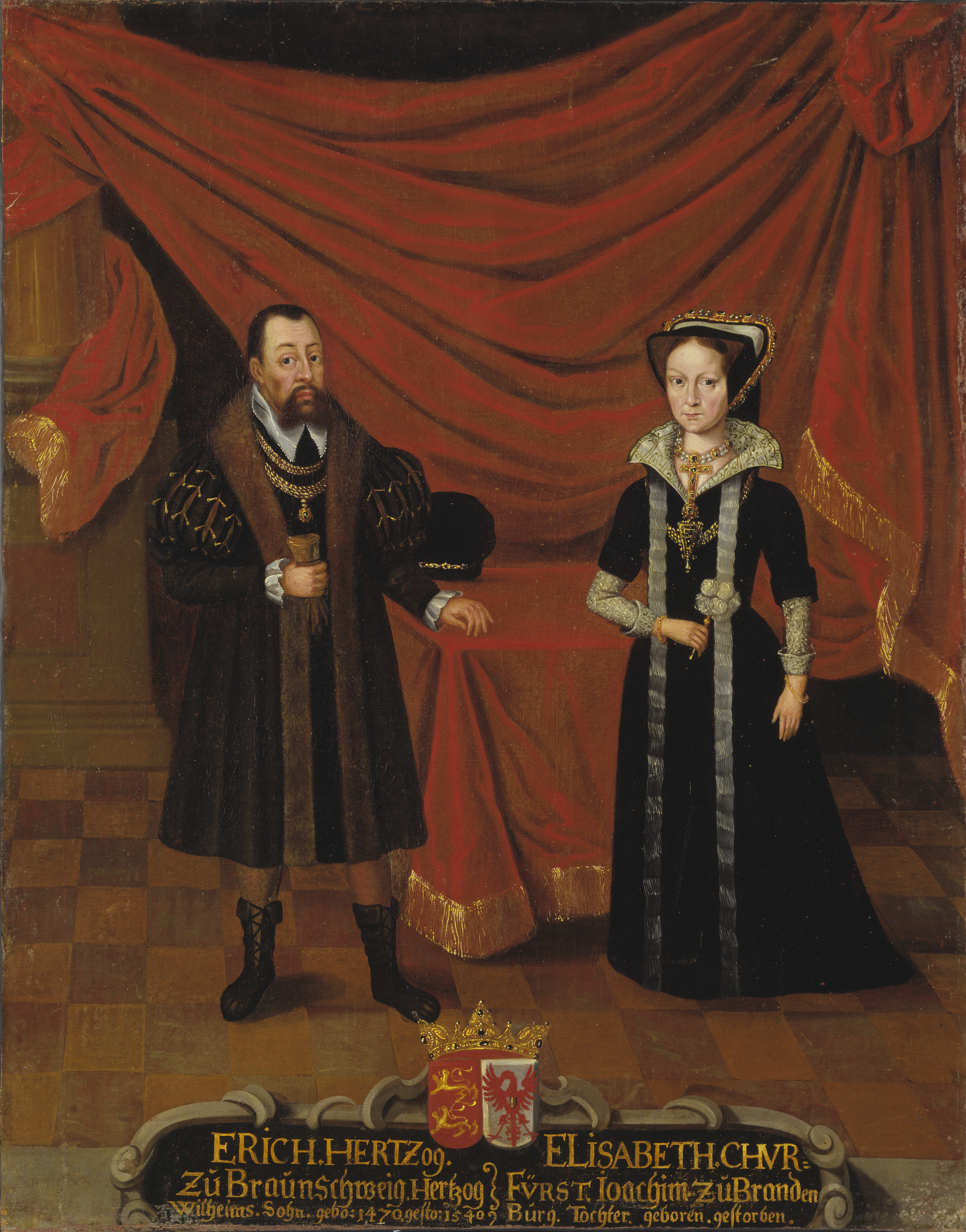
Elizabeth and Eric c. 1530

In 1528, Elisabeth accused Anna von Rumschottel, a member of the landed gentry and for many years her husband's mistress, of being responsible for complications during her second pregnancy. Despite her humanist upbringing, Elisabeth accused Anna of witchcraft and urged her husband to have Anna burned at the stake. Elisabeth also sent her own spies and soldiers into the neighboring Diocese of Minden to arrest Anna in her hideout in Minden. However, Anna escaped. During Inquisition proceedings against Anna's alleged helpers, some of the accused women died after torture at the stake. Elisabeth managed to force Eric into giving her a more profitable wittum than their marriage contract required: instead of the district of Calenberg in the Unterwald region, which contained Calenberg Castle, Neustadt and Hanover and provided little revenue, she received Oberwald, with the towns of Münden, Northeim and Göttingen, which provided more revenue and greater political weight. Her pregnancy ended with the birth of a healthy male baby, who grew up to be Eric's successor Eric II of Brunswick-Göttingen-Calenberg.

When Elisabeth visited her mother at Lichtenberg Castle in 1534, she met Martin Luther personally for the first time. She began to regularly correspond with him in 1538. She sent him cheese and wine and he sent her mulberries and fig tree seedlings and his German Bible translation with a personal dedication. On 7 April, Elisabeth publicly accepted communion under both kinds and thereby expressed her conversion to the Lutheran faith. On October 6, she informed Landgrave Philip I of Hesse of her conversion and with his assistance, invited the reformer Anton Corvinus to move from nearby Witzenhausen to Münden. Eric I tolerated the conversion. Although Lutheranism was inconsistent with his Catholic upbringing and his loyalty to the Emperor, he admired the reformer's courage.

=== Regency and Reformation (1540–1545) ===
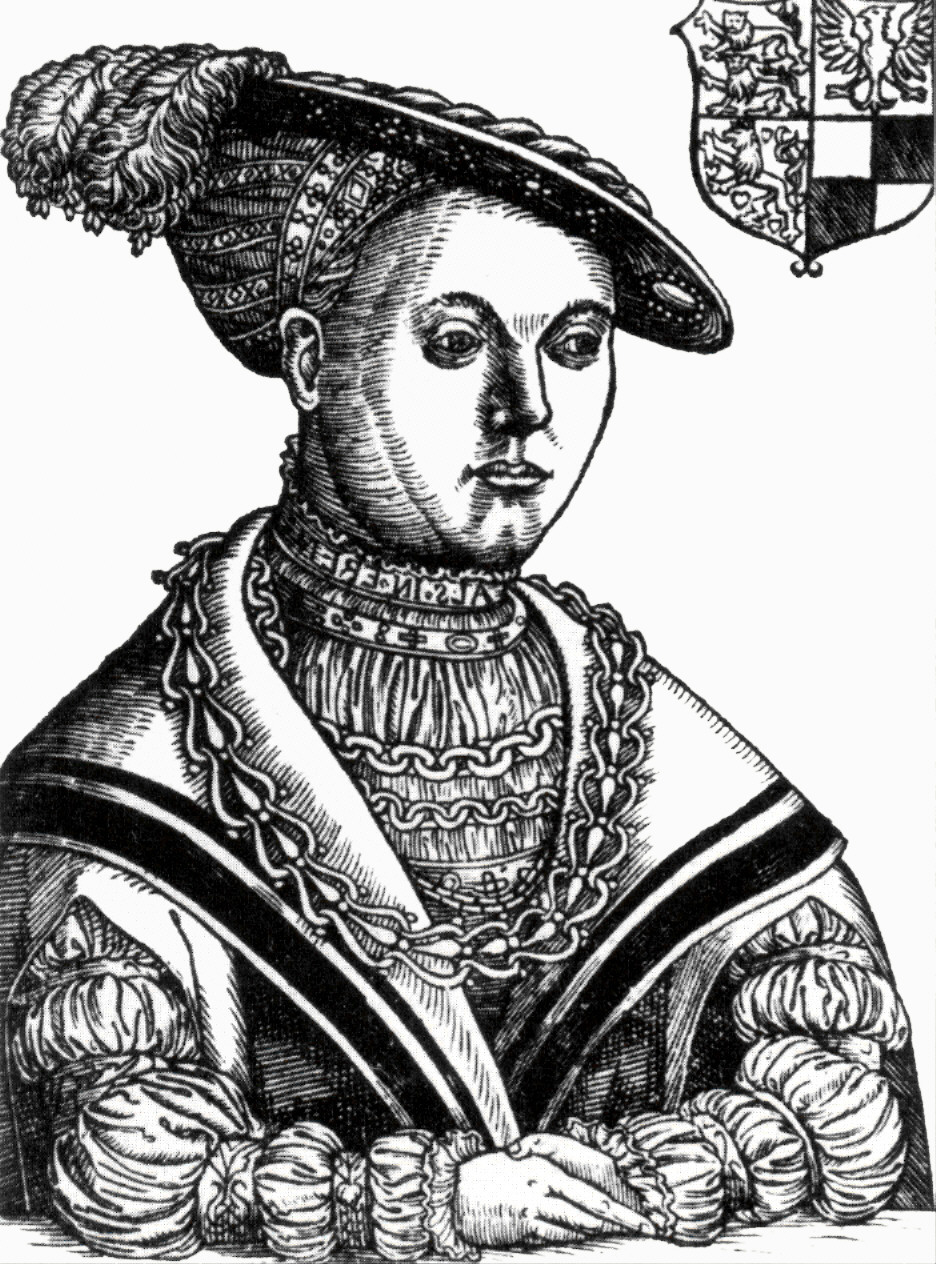
Elisabeth, woodcut around 1542

Elisabeth had a strong ally in Elector John Frederick I of Saxony. When Eric I died on 30 July 1540, he helped her become co-regent of Brunswick-Calenberg-Göttingen, together with Philip I of Hesse, despite fierce resistance from Duke Henry II of Brunswick-Wolfenbüttel. She and Philip were regents for five years; she used this opportunity to implement the Reformation in the principality and to reorganize the princely household.

Anton Corvinus was appointed superintendent of the principality, with an office in Pattensen. The lawyer Justus von Waldhausen, who had studied at Wittenberg, was appointed to princely Councillor and later to chancellor, on the recommendation of Martin Luther. The physician Burckard Mithoff, the court judge Justin Gobler and Heinrich Campe MJ completed the team with which the princess wanted to implement her reforms.

In 1542, a Church Order for all of Calenberg-Göttingen was issued. This was followed up by a thorough visitation from 17 November 1542 to 30 April 1543, which Elisabeth personally participated in. A monastic order issued 4 November 1542 regulated the conversion of the monasteries to Protestantism. A Court Procedures Order was enacted in 1544, to regulate legal relations in the country. The princess also wrote many spiritual songs and an "open letter" to her subjects to strengthen their faith.

She had arranged long before that her son Eric II would marry Philip's daughter Anna of Hesse in 1554. Eric, however, fell in love with Sidonie, the sister of Duke (and future Elector) Maurice of Saxony, who was also Lutheran. At the urging of her son, Elisabeth cancelled the agreement with the court of Hesse and Eric married the ten years older Sidonie on 17 May 1545.

Elisabeth also wrote a "government manual" for Eric II, with important advice that should serve him as a guide for when he ruled on his own.

=== Later life (1545–1558) ===
In 1546, one year after the accession of her son Eric II, Elisabeth married Count Poppo XII of Henneberg (1513–1574), a younger brother of the husband of her eldest daughter. She retained the regency over her wittum Münden. With great concern she watched her son revert to Catholicism, hoping for opportunities at the imperial court. In 1548, he accepted the Augsburg Interim. He went as far as arresting the reformers Anton Corvinus and Walter Hoiker, who, together with 140 other pastors, had vehemently objected to the Interim at the 1549 synod in Münden. Corvinus and Hoiker were held prisoner at Calenberg Castle from 1549 to 1522.

In 1550, Elisabeth managed to marry her daughter Anna Marie to the 40-year-older Duke Albert of Prussia, with whom she had conducted a friendly correspondence for many years. In the marriage book, she wrote some important advice for Anna Marie on her upcoming married state. The Osiandrian controversy, a Lutheran theological debate over the finer points of justification, was the subject of 1551 letters to her son-in-law, Albert, Duke of Prussia, who along with others recognized and supported her theological, literary and official efforts.

After the Battle of Sievershausen, in 1553, Elisabeth was expelled from Münden by Duke Henry the Younger of Brunswick-Wolfenbüttel, the nephew of her late husband. She fled to Hannover. In 1555, she moved to Ilmenau in the County of Henneberg, in the modern-day Thuringia, where she took up the pen once more and wrote a book of consolation for widows that they should help them in their grief.

She had to watch with horror when her son Eric II in 1557 married her youngest daughter, the Lutheran Catherine, to the Catholic High Burgrave William of Rosenberg, to provide for her economically. When Elisabeth completed the difficult journey to Münden to attend the wedding, she found that Eric had deliberately given her the wrong date and that the marriage had taken place some time earlier. After the announcement of the marriage contract, Elisabeth was surprised to learn that Catherine would retain her Lutheran faith and would employ her own Lutheran pastor at court.

Elisabeth died a year later, in 1558, in Ilmenau. Her children commissioned an epitaph with her portrait by the sculptor Sigmund Linger from Innsbruck, which was erected in 1566 in the St. Giles Chapel of the St. John's Church in Schleusingen.

== Issue ==
From her first marriage, to Eric I of Brunswick-Göttingen-Calenberg, Elisabeth had a son and three daughters:

- Elisabeth (born: 8 April 1526; died: 19 August 1566), married in 1543 to Count George Ernest of Henneberg (1511–1583)
- Eric II, Duke of Brunswick-Calenberg (born: 10 August 1528; died: 17 November 1584)

married firstly, in 1545, Sidonie of Saxony (born: 8 March 1518; died: 4 January 1575), daughter of Duke Henry IV of Saxony and Catherine of Mecklenburg
married secondly, in 1576 Dorothea of Lorraine (born: 24 August 1545; died: 2 June 1621), daughter of Francis I of Lorraine and Christina of Denmark

- Anna Maria (born: 23 April 1532; died: 20 March 1568)

married in 1550 with Duke Albert the Elder of Prussia (1490-1568)

- Catherine (born: 1534; died: 10 May 1559)

married in 1557 with William of Rosenberg, High Burgrave of Bohemia (1535-1592)

== Ancestors ==
Ancestors of Elisabeth of Brandenburg, Duchess of Brunswick-Calenberg-Göttingen

8. Albrecht III, Elector of Brandenburg
4. John Cicero, Elector of Brandenburg
9. Margaret of Baden
2. Joachim I, Elector of Brandenburg
10. William III, Landgrave of Thuringia
5. Margaret of Thuringia
11. Anne, Duchess of Luxembourg
1. Elisabeth of Brandenburg
12. Christian I of Denmark
6. John of Denmark
13. Dorothea of Brandenburg
3. Elisabeth of Denmark
14. Ernest, Elector of Saxony
7. Christina of Saxony
15. Elisabeth of Bavaria

== Archives ==
- City Archiv Göttingen: Acta religionis et reformationis
- Main State Archive Hannover: Sign. Cal. Br. Archiv
- City Archive Langenhagen: Sammlung Herzogin Elisabeth von Calenberg

== Works by Elisabeth of Brandenburg ==
- Ein Sendbrief an ihre Untertanen, printed: Hannover, 1544
- Regierungshandbuch für ihren Sohn Erich II, 1545
- Mütterlicher Unterricht (Ehestandsbuch) für Anna Maria. 1550
- Trostbuch für Witwen, 1555, printed: 1556 Second edition, Leipzig, 1598
- Elisabeth von Braunschweig-Lüneburg und Albrecht von Preußen. Ein Fürstenbriefwechsel der Reformationszeit, ed. von Ingeborg Mengel, Göttingen, 1954; second unchanged edition: Göttingen, 2001, ISBN 3-89744-062-8

=== Collected by other authors ===
Elisabeth also wrote numerous hymns and prayers, some of which are included in:

- Iwan Franz: Elisabeth von Kalenberg-Göttingen als Liederdichterin, in: Zeitschrift des Verein für niedersächsische Geschichte, 1872, pp. 183–195.
- Eduard Freiherr von der Goltz: Lieder der Herzogin Elisabeth von Braunschweig-Lüneburg, in: Zeitschrift der Gesellschaft für niedersächsische Kirchengeschichte, issue 19 1914, p. 147–208.
- Katharina Schridde CCR Sr. and Katharina Talkne,: Mit Lust und Liebe. Das Elisabeth-Brevier, Lutherisches Verlagshaus, 2009, ISBN 978-3-7859-0993-5

== References about Elisabeth of Brandenburg ==
- Albert Brauch: Die Verwaltung des Territoriums Calenberg-Göttingen während der Regentschaft der Herzogin Elisabeth (1540–1546), thesis, Hamburg, 1921, Lax Verlag, Hildesheim, 1930
- Adolf Brenneke: Herzogin Elisabeth von Braunschweig-Lüneburg. Die hannoversche Reformationsfürstin als Persönlichkeit, in: Zeitschrift der Gesellschaft für niedersächsische Kirchengeschichte, issue 38, 1933, p. 152–168.
- Sonja Domröse: Frauen der Reformationszeit, Gelehrt, mutig und glaubensfest, Vandenhoeck & Ruprecht, Göttingen, 2010, ISBN 978-3-525-55012-0
- A. Kurs: Elisabeth, Herzogin von Braunschweig-Calenberg, Halle an der Saale, 1891
- Hans Liederwald: Die Ehe des Grafen Poppo von Henneberg mit Elisabeth, in: Neue Beiträge zur Geschichte dt. Altertums, issue 36, 1931, pp. 37–88
- Andrea Lilienthal: Die Fürstin und die Macht. Welfische Herzoginnen im 16. Jahrhundert: Elisabeth, Sidonia, Sophia = Quellen und Darstellungen zur Geschichte Niedersachsens, vol. 127, Hahnsche Buchhandlung, Hannover, 2007
- Inge Mager: Elisabeth von Brandenburg – Sidonie von Sachsen. Zwei Frauenschicksale im Kontext der Reformation von Calenberg-Göttingen, in: 450 Jahre Reformation im Calenberger Land, edited by the Ev.-luth. Kirchenkreis Laatzen-Pattensen, 1992, pp. 23–32
- Ingeborg Klettke-Mengel: Elisabeth von Braunschweig-Lüneburg als reformatorische Christin, in: Jahrbuch der Gesellschaft für niedersächsische Kirchengeschichte, vol. 56, 1958, pp. 1–16.
- Dies: Elisabeth, Herzogin von Braunschweig-Lüneburg (Calenberg) 1510–1558, in: Neue Deutsche Biographie, vol. 4 1959, pp. 443–444.
- Ernst-August Nebig: Elisabeth Herzogin von Calenberg. Regentin, Reformatorin, Schriftstellerin, MatrixMedia Verlag, Göttingen, 2006, ISBN 3-932313-18-6
- Heinrich Wilhelm Rotermund: Von den Verdiensten der Herzogin Elisabeth um die Ausbreitung der evangelischen Lehre in den Fuerstenthuemern Calenberg und Grubenhagen, in: Hannoversches Magazin, vol. 75/76, 1819, pp. 1189–1206.
- Paul Tschackert: Herzogin Elisabeth, geb. Markgräfin von Brandenburg. Die erste Schriftstellerin aus dem Hause Brandenburg und aus dem braunschweigischem Hause. Ihr Lebensgang und ihre Werke, in: Hohenzollern-Jahrbuch, vol. 3, 1899, pp. 49–65 Online
- Merry Wiesner: Herzogin Elisabeth von Braunschweig-Lüneburg (1510–1558), in: Kerstin Merkel and Heide Wunder (eds.): Deutsche Frauen der frühen Neuzeit, Darmstadt, 2000, pp. 39–48, ISBN 3-89678-187-1
- Eleonore Dehnerdt: Die Reformatorin: Elisabeth von Calenberg, SCM Hänssler, 2010, ISBN 978-3-7751-5181-8
