= Elisabeth of Brunswick-Calenberg =

- Born: 8 April 1526; Nienover
- Died: 19 August 1566 (aged 40); Schleusingen
- Buried: Castle church in Schleusingen
- Noble family: House of Guelph
- Spouse: George Ernest of Henneberg
- Father: Eric I, Duke of Brunswick-Lüneburg
- Mother: Elisabeth of Brandenburg

Elisabeth of Brunswick-Calenberg (8 April 1526 in Nienover – 19 August 1566 in Schleusingen) was a princess of Brunswick-Calenberg by birth and by marriage a Countess of Henneberg.

== Life ==
Elizabeth was the eldest child of the Duke Eric I of Brunswick-Calenberg and his wife Elisabeth (1510–1558), the daughter of Elector Joachim I of Brandenburg. Elisabeth was raised as a strict Protestant by her mother.

Elisabeth married on 19 August 1543 in Münden to Count George Ernest of Henneberg (1511–1583). His brother Poppo XII had married Elisabeth's mother two years earlier. Her mother, her brother Eric II and her cousin Joachim II Hector guaranteed her dowry of 20000guilders. The monastery at Weende contributed 350 guilders towards this dowry. As her jointure, she was promised the districts of Schleusingen, Themar and Suhl. Via his marriage to Elisabeth, George Ernest came into contact with the leading Protestant dynasties in Germany.

Elisabeth's marriage remained childless. She was devoted to piety and charity and was considered "peaceful". As a strictly evangelical countess consort, she played a decisive rôle in converting the county of Henneberg to Protestantism. The county provided asylum to several displaced Protestant preachers.

Elisabeth died on 19 August 1566 and was buried in the castle church in Schleusingen. Her grave was decorated with an epitaph which had been crafted during her lifetime. Prior to her death, the Henneberg family buried their dead in Vessra Abbey, however, George Ernest decided to move the family burial location to the Schleusingen.
