= Elisabeth of Brunswick =

Elisabeth of Brunswick may refer to:

- Catherine Elisabeth of Brunswick-Lüneburg (1385–after 1423), daughter of Magnus II, Duke of Brunswick-Lüneburg, wife of Gerhard VI, Count of Holstein
- Elisabeth of Brunswick-Wolfenbüttel (1593–1650), daughter of Henry Julius, Duke of Brunswick-Lüneburg; wife and duchess of August of Saxony and later John Philip, Duke of Saxe-Altenburg
- Elisabeth of Brunswick-Lüneburg, Duchess of Guelders (1494–1572), daughter of Henry the Middle, Duke of Brunswick-Lüneburg, wife of Charles II, Duke of Guelders
- Elisabeth of Brunswick-Calenberg (1526–1566), daughter of Eric I, Duke of Brunswick-Lüneburg, wife of George Ernest, Count of Henneberg
- Elisabeth Christine of Brunswick-Wolfenbüttel (1691–1750), daughter of Louis Rudolph, Duke of Brunswick-Lüneburg; wife of Charles VI, Holy Roman Emperor
- Elisabeth Christine of Brunswick-Wolfenbüttel-Bevern (1715–1797), daughter of Ferdinand Albert II, Duke of Brunswick-Wolfenbüttel, wife of Frederick II of Prussia
- Elisabeth Christine of Brunswick-Wolfenbüttel, Crown Princess of Prussia (1746–1840), daughter of Charles I, Duke of Brunswick-Wolfenbüttel; wife of Frederick William II of Prussia
- Elizabeth Antonovna of Brunswick-Lüneburg (1743–1782), daughter of Duke Anthony Ulrich of Brunswick, imprisoned by Empress Elizabeth of Russia along with her family for her entire life.
