= Anna Maria of Brunswick-Calenberg-Göttingen =

Anna Maria of Brunswick-Lüneburg
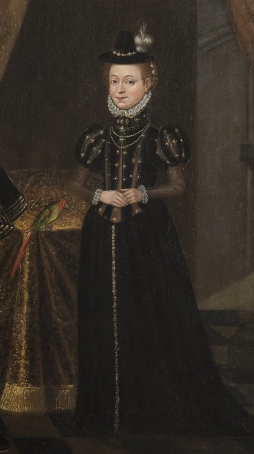

Duchess consort of Prussia
- Tenure: 26 February 1550 – 20 March 1568
- Born: 23 April 1532; Münden (Hann. Münden as of 1990)
- Died: 20 March 1568 (aged 35); Neuhausen (Gurievsk as of 1946)
- Spouse: Albert, Duke of Prussia (m. 1550; died 1568)
- Issue among others...: Albert Frederick, Duke of Prussia
- House: House of Guelph
- Father: Eric I, Duke of Brunswick-Lüneburg
- Mother: Elizabeth of Brandenburg

Anna Maria of Brunswick-Calenberg-Göttingen (German: Anna Maria von Braunschweig-Calenberg-Göttingen; 23 April 1532 in Münden – 20 March 1568 in Neuhausen near Königsberg in Prussia) was a Duchess of Brunswick-Lüneberg by birth and by marriage Duchess of Prussia.

== Life ==
Anna Maria was the daughter of Duke Eric I of Brunswick-Calenberg (1470–1540) and Elizabeth of Brandenburg (1510–1558). She married in 1550 Margrave Albert I of Brandenburg-Ansbach (1490–1568), who had been created the first Duke of Prussia in 1525; she was his second wife. Albert died of the plague on 20 March 1568 at Tapiau Castle. Anna Maria herself died 16 hours later from the plague too.

== Issue ==
- Elisabeth (20 May 1551 – 19 February 1596).
- Albert Frederick (29 April 1553 – 18 August 1618), who succeeded as Duke of Prussia.

== Bibliography ==
- Henry Gardiner Adams, ed. (1857). "Anna Maria". A Cyclopaedia of Female Biography: 44. Wikidata Q115748577.

Anna Maria of Brunswick-Calenberg-Göttingen House of Welf Born: 23 April 1532 Died: 20 March 1568
Vacant Title last held by Dorothea of Denmark	Duchess consort of Prussia; 1550–1568	Succeeded by Marie Eleonore of Cleves
