= Anna Rumschottel =

Anna (von) Rumschottel (fl. 1532) was the mistress of Eric I, Duke of Brunswick-Lüneburg.

She was a member of the landed gentry. She became the lover of Eric I when he became a widower. The relationship was discontinued when Eric married Elisabeth of Brandenburg, and Eric I stated to Elisabeth that his mistress was dead, going so far as to arrange a mock funeral for her. The relationship was resumed during Elisabeth's recovery after the birth of their daughter Anna Maria, and continued even after the recovery of Elisabeth, as the pregnancy had caused her to become ill. The affair was public when Anna gave birth in a secluded castle. Elisabeth took deep offense, and complained of the affair in a 1549 letter to Albrecht of Prussia.

Elisabeth accused Anna of having caused her illness and complications during her second pregnancy. She accused Anna of witchcraft and urged her husband to have Anna burned at the stake. She persuaded Eric to allow Anna to be charged with witchcraft. Elisabeth sent spies and soldiers into the neighboring Diocese of Minden, in order to arrest Anna in her hideout in Minden. However, Anna escaped. During Inquisition proceedings against Anna's alleged helpers, some of the accused women died at the stake. She wished to have also Anna convicted and executed by burning. However, Eric I arranged for Anna to escape. This caused Elisabeth to appeal to her father to intervene, and eventually caused the separation between Elisabeth and Eric.

== Sources ==
- Martina Schattkowsky, Witwenschaft in der frühen Neuzeit: fürstliche und adlige Witwen zwischen
