= Hermann Friedrich Teichmeyer =

German physician and botanist (1685–1746)

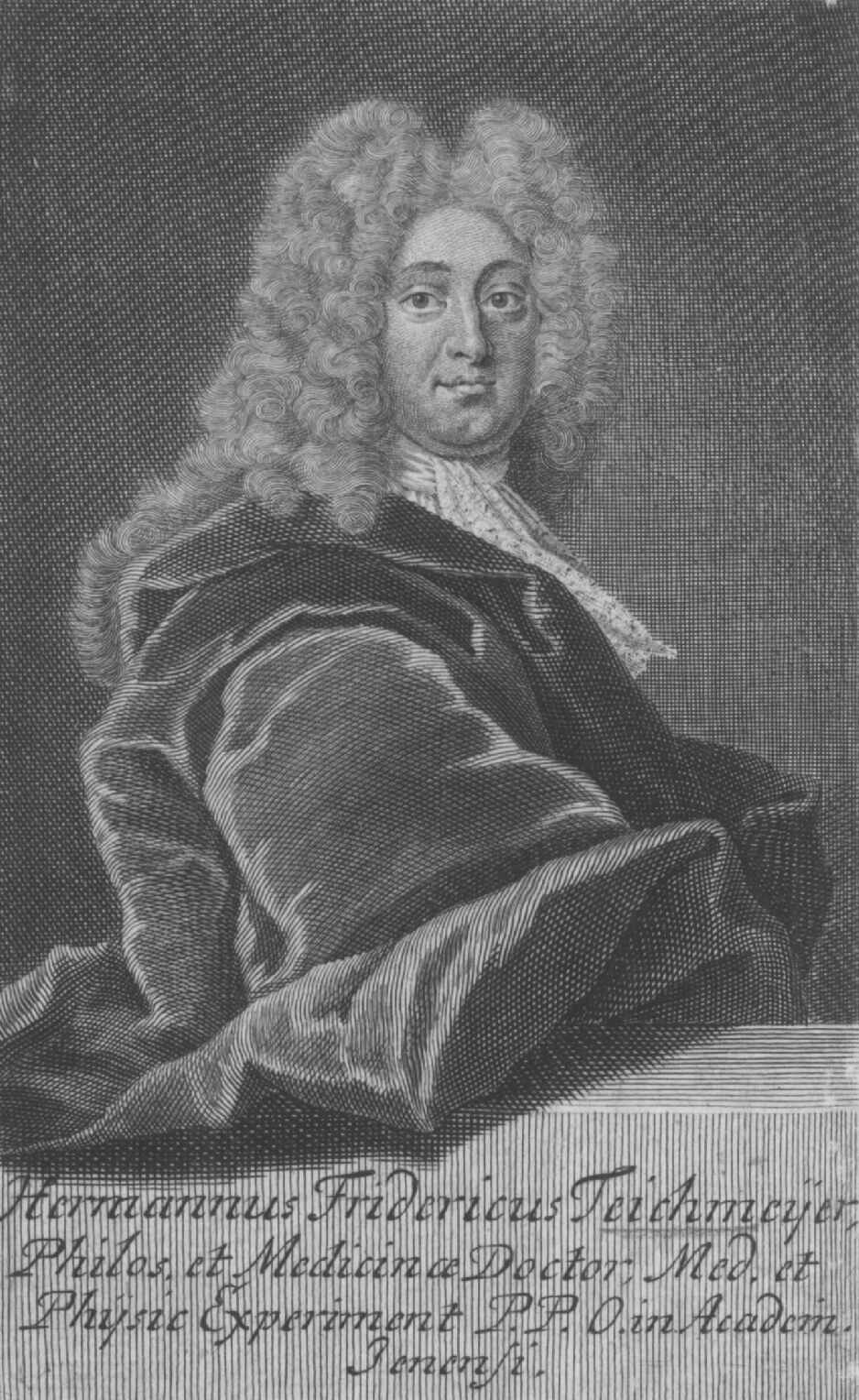
Hermann Friedrich Teichmeyer

Hermann Friedrich Teichmeyer (30 April 1685 – 5 February 1746) was a German physician and botanist born in Hannoversch Münden. He was father-in-law to Albrecht von Haller (1708–1777).

The botanical genus Teichmeyeria (Scop., 1777) is likely named after him, although etymological information is lacking. It is considered to be synonymous with the genus Gustavia.

Teichmeyer was a professor of experimental physics, medicine and botany at the University of Jena. He was a pioneer of forensic medicine, being remembered for his 1723 publication of Institutiones medicinae legalis vel forensis, an important textbook on forensics that was later translated into German.
