= Eric I of Brunswick-Lüneburg =

Duke in the Holy Roman Empire

Eric I, Duke of Brunswick-Lüneburg
- Prince of Calenberg-Göttingen
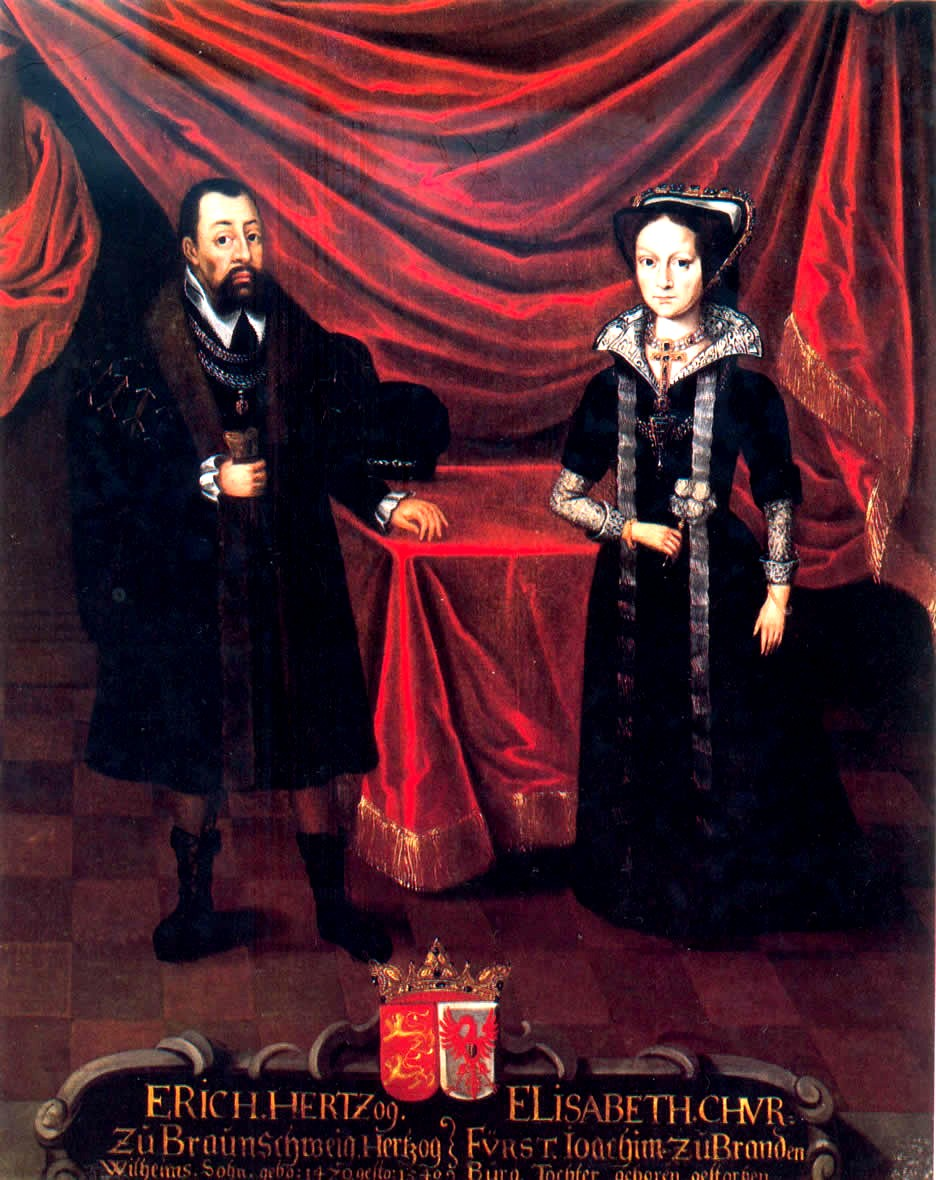
- Eric with his second wife Elisabeth ca. 1530
- Born: 16 February 1470; Neustadt am Rübenberge
- Died: 30 July 1540 (aged 70); Haguenau
- Noble family: House of Guelph
- Spouses: Katharina of Saxony; Elisabeth of Brandenburg
- Issue: Elisabeth; Eric II; Anna Maria; Katharina
- Father: William II, Duke of Brunswick-Calenberg-Göttingen
- Mother: Elizabeth of Stolberg-Wernigerode

Eric I, the Elder (German: Erich I., der Ältere; 16 February 1470 – 30 July 1540) was Duke of Brunswick-Lüneburg from 1495 and the first reigning prince of Calenberg-Göttingen.

== Life and works ==
=== Ancestry ===
Eric I was born on 16 February 1470 in Neustadt am Rübenberge at the castle of Rovenburg. He was the founder of the Calenberg line of the House of Brunswick-Lüneburg. His father, William II, died in 1503, but had already divided his lands in 1495, between his sons, Henry and Eric. Eric was given the Principalities of Calenberg and Göttingen, whilst Henry received the Principality of Brunswick-Wolfenbüttel. Eric thus became Duke of the Principality of Calenberg-Göttingen in 1495. Even as a boy, Eric had travelled as a pilgrim to Jerusalem and toured Italy before he entered the service of Emperor Maximilian I. Gerhard Kurzmann writes that, "driven by a thirst for adventure, [Eric] traveled through Europe and the Holy Land at a young age."

=== In the service of the emperor ===
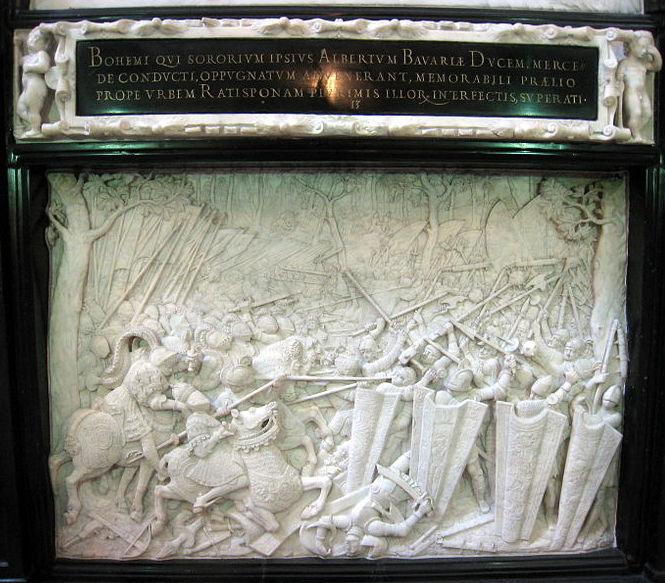
Relief No.13 in the cenotaph of Emperor Maximilian I, Innsbruck. Eric saved the life of Maximilian in the Battle of Wenzenbach, Regensburg.

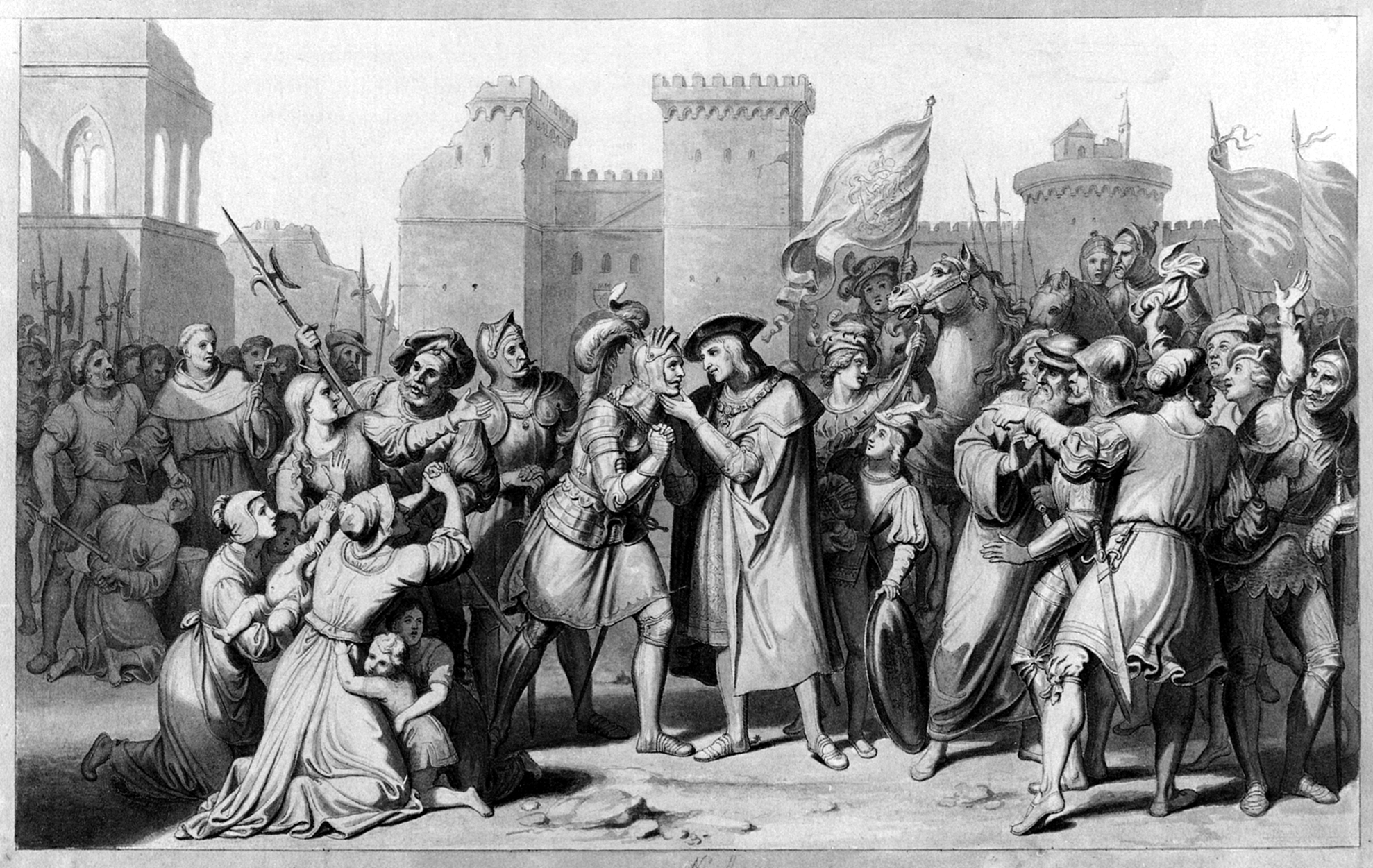
Duke Eric the Elder of Calenberg receives from Emperor Maximilian before the fortress of Kufstein in Tyrol a symbolic box on the ear, because he had dared to ask the emperor for the life of the vanquished. As Duke Eric had saved the emperor in 1504 at the Battle of Regensburg, the emperor granted the wish of his godson and let the occupants of the castle go free

Even in his early years Eric had proved himself as a brave fighter at the side of the emperors and took part in 1497 in the campaign against the Turks. Later he fought in wars against Venice, the Swiss confederation and France. In the Bavarian-Landshut war in 1504 he saved the emperor's life at the Battle of Regensburg, whereupon he was knighted.

Eric I was the second son of Duke William II of Brunswick-Wolfenbüttel (d 1503) and received in 1491, before his father died, his inheritance of the Principality of Calenberg-Göttingen. His elder brother, Duke Henry the Elder (1463–1514) was given rule over Brunswick-Wolfenbüttel. In 1505 the 35-year-old Duke Eric I of Calenberg made Neustadt am Rübenberge his second seat of power.

When the first marriage of the duke to the widow of Archduke Sigismund of Austria, Katharina of Saxony, proved childless, he married after her death on 7 July 1525 the 15-year-old Elisabeth of Brandenburg. From this marriage resulted his long-awaited successor Eric II (1528–1584). When, in 1528, Elisabeth fell ill in bed when she was pregnant, she held the witchcraft of her husband's mistress, Anna Rumschottel, responsible. She persuaded her husband to hold a trial. In the process, several women were burned to death, but the duke allowed his mistress to escape. She was however burnt to death in Hamelin.

During the Hildesheim Diocesan Feud (1519–1523) he captured Hunnesrück Castle in 1521, together with Henry the Younger of Wolfenbüttel. It lay on a hill near the present town district of Hunnesrück in Dassel. He bombarded the castle with heavy cannon from the hill of Hatop. He gave the castle up after a short period however. Between 1527 and 1530, he had the castle of Erichsburg built in a marshy depression about 3 km further east which was protected by a wide moat and high ramparts. It was named after his heir, born in 1528, later Duke Eric II. Eric I used it from time to time as his seat of office. Whilst it was being built he lived in the old castle at Hunnesrück.

After the feud, the Amt of Kolding and Poppenburg were transferred to Duke Eric I in accordance with the requirements of the Quedlinburg Recess. In 1523 abbey parish of St. Andrew in Derneburg placed itself under the protection of Eric I of Calenberg, because it had been repeatedly plundered by the knights of Duke Henry II of Brunswick-Lüneburg.

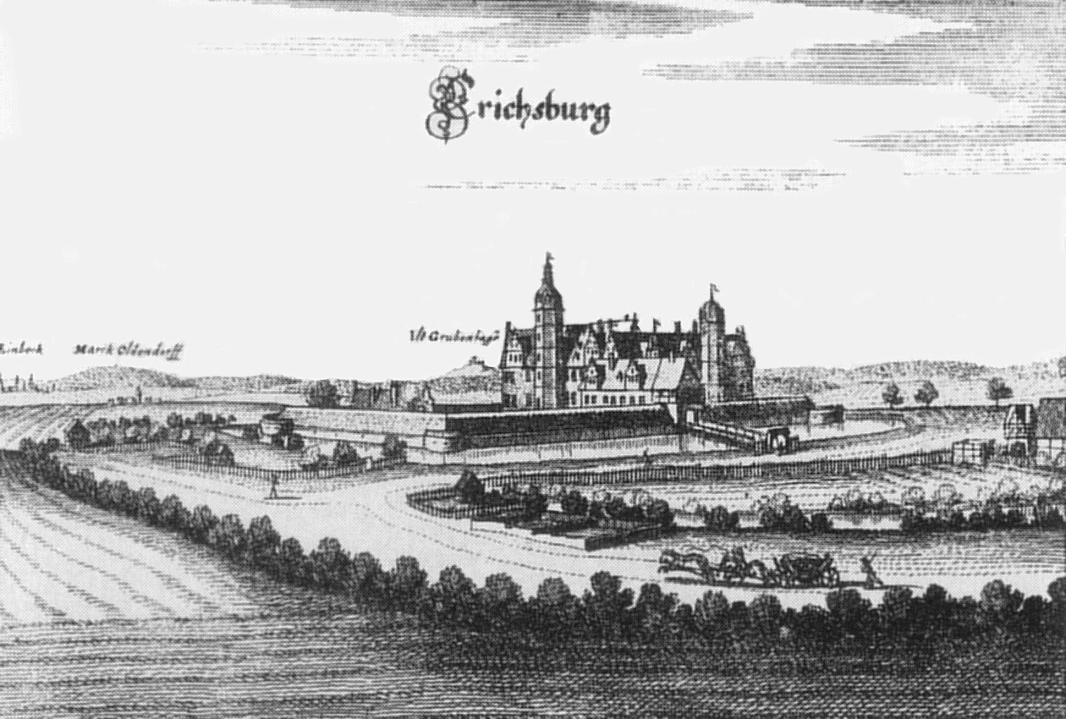
The Erichsburg, named after Eric's eponymous son. Copperplate by Merian around 1650

In 1529, Eric allowed the town of Hanover to hold an annual Schützenfest ("shooting festival"), which today has become the Hanover Schützenfest, the largest of its kind in the world. In 1530 he took Aerzen back into the possession of the Welfs (his coat of arms is over the door in the north wing of the castle). In 1539, Eric I united the former Ämter of Hunnesrück, Lüthorst and Lauenberg into the new Amt of Erichsburg which remained in that form until 1643. In 1540, just under 23 years after the Martin Luther's posting of his theses, Duke Eric I of Calenberg-Göttingen died. His son, Eric II, was still a child, which is why his mother, the Duchess Elisabeth, took over the reign for five years. Two years earlier she had publicly allowed communion to be taken in both kinds in a church service. From then on she and her husband followed separate confessions: the duke remained Roman Catholic, the duchess became Lutheran.

Duke Eric I died on 30 July 1540 at the Reichstag in Haguenau, Alsace. He left behind large debts, estimated at 900,000 thalers, as well as two important buildings: the Erichsburg near Dassel and the rebuilt Calenberg Castle. His funeral took place in 1541 in Hann. Münden's St. Blasius Church, after his body was released in Haguenau one year after his death on payment of his debts. This required every subject in his duchy to pay 16 pfennigs.

== Offspring ==
Duke Eric had a son and three daughters by his second wife, Elisabeth of Brandenburg:

- Elisabeth (8 April 1526 — 19 August 1566) m. (1543) Count George Ernest of Henneberg (1511–1583)
- Eric II, Duke of Brunswick-Calenberg (10 August 1528 — 17 November 1584)

m. (1545–1573) Sidonie of Saxony (8 March 1518 — 4 January 1575), daughter of Henry of Saxony and Catherine of Mecklenburg, m. (1576) Dorothea of Lorraine (24 August 1545 — 2 June 1621), daughter of Francis I of Lorraine and Christina of Denmark

- Anna Maria (23 April 1532 — 20 March 1568) m. (1550) Albert the Elder, Margrave of Brandenburg-Ansbach, Duke of Prussia (1490–1568)
- Katharina (1534 — 10 May 1559) m. (1557) William of Rosenberg, Senior Burgrave (Oberburggraf) of Bohemia (1535–1592)

== Ancestors ==
Ancestors of Eric I of Brunswick-Lüneburg

8. Henry the Mild, Duke of Brunswick-Lüneburg
4. William the Victorious, Duke of Brunswick-Lüneburg
9. Sophie of Pomerania
2. William II, Duke of Brunswick-Calenberg-Göttingen
10. Frederick I, Elector of Brandenburg
5. Cecilia of Brandenburg
11. Elisabeth of Bavaria-Landshut
1. Eric I, Duke of Brunswick-Lüneburg
12. Henry VIII, Count of Stolberg
6. Bodo VII, Count of Stolberg-Wernigerode
13. Elisabeth of Mansfeld
3. Elisabeth of Stolberg-Wernigerode
14. Henry XXIV, Count of Schwarzburg-Blankenburg
7. Anna of Schwarzburg-Blankenburg
15. Duchess Catherine of Brunswick-Giffhorn

== Sources ==
- Karl Janicke (1877). "Eric I" . Allgemeine Deutsche Biographie (in German). Vol. 6. Leipzig: Duncker & Humblot. pp. 203–204.
- Klaus Friedland (1959). "Erich I". Neue Deutsche Biographie (in German). Vol. 4. Berlin: Duncker & Humblot. pp. 584–584.
- Wolfgang Kunze: Herzog Erich I. von Braunschweig-Lüneburg. In: Wolfgang Kunze (Hg.): Leben und Bauten Herzog Erichs II. von Braunschweig-Lüneburg. Catalogue of the historic exhibition at Landestrost Castle, Neustadt am Rübenberge. Hanover 1993, p. 31–45.
- Joachim Lehrmann: Hexenverfolgung in Hannover-Calenberg und Calenberg-Göttingen, Lehrte, 2005. ISBN 978-3-9803642-5-6

Eric I of Brunswick-Lüneburg House of Welf Cadet branch of the House of Este Born: 16 February 1470 Died: 30 July 1540
Regnal titles
Preceded by William II	Duke of Brunswick-Lüneburg; Prince of Brunswick-Wolfenbüttel joint reign with his brother Henry the Evil; 1491–1494	Succeeded by Henry the Evil
Preceded by William II	Duke of Brunswick-Lüneburg; Princes of Calenberg until 1494 joint reign with his brother Henry the Evil; 1491–1540	Succeeded by Eric II
Preceded by William II	Duke of Brunswick-Lüneburg; Prince of Göttingen; 1495	Göttingen merged into Calenberg
