= Calenberg Castle =

Castle ruins in Lower Saxony, Germany

- Feste Calenberg
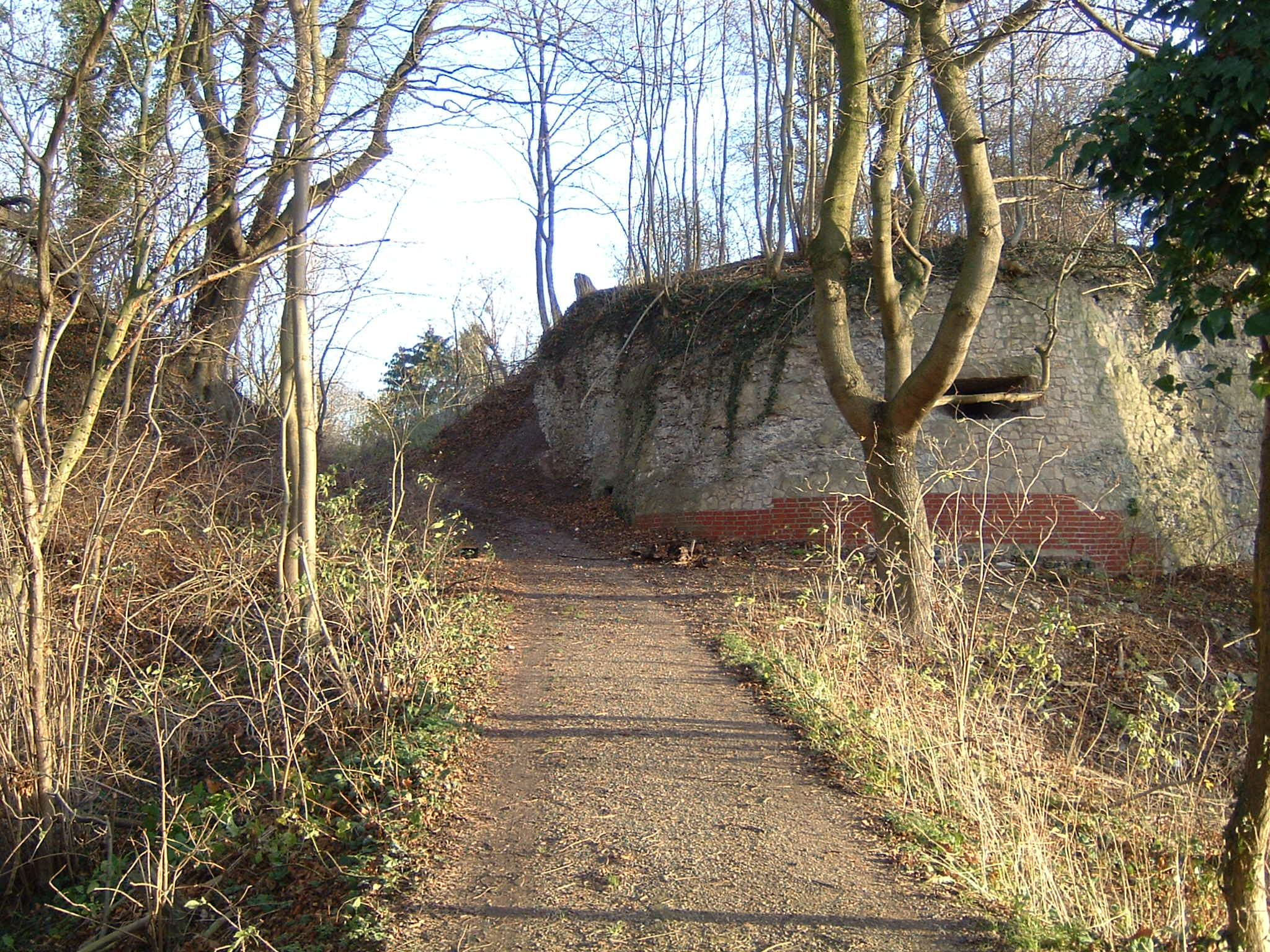
- Battery tower at the main entrance. Above ground, all that remains of the fort are its mighty ramparts and a few building ruins.

- Location within Lower Saxony Calenberg Castle (Germany)
- Alternative names: Fort Calenburg

General information
- Type: Lowland castle (Niederungsburg)
- Classification: Ruined
- Location: Pattensen-Schulenburg
- Coordinates: 52.19639°N 9.79639°E
- Completed: from 1292
- Owner: Dukes of Brunswick-Lüneburg, Princes of Calenberg

Technical details
- Structural system: Stone structures and earth ramparts

Calenberg Castle (German: Burg Calenberg, later called Schloss Calenberg and Feste Calenberg; ruins known as Alt Calenberg) was a medieval lowland castle in central Germany, near Schulenburg in the borough of Pattensen, 13 kilometres (8.1 mi) west of the city of Hildesheim. It was built as a water castle in 1292 by the Welf duke, Otto the Strict, in der Leine river meadows between two branches of the Leine river on the southern part of the chalk marl hill of the Calenberg. At the start of the 16th century it was converted into a fort (Feste). In the 15th century, Fort Calenberg gave its name to the Welf Principality of Calenberg. Following the Thirty Years' War it lost its military importance and was slighted. Today it is a ruin with underground vaults that are surrounded by high ramparts.

== Etymology ==
The word Feste or Veste ("fort") stems, like the words Festung ("fortress") and Befestigung ("fortification") from the adjective fest ("strong", "firm" or "immovable"). The adjective in turn has its roots in the Middle High German and Middle Low German word veste and the Old High German word festi meaning: fortress, castle, fortification and security of a location.

The word syllables Kal, Kalen-, Calen- in the word Calenberg are derived from the word kal in the Middle High German and Middle Low German languages and mean "bare", "stripped" or "treeless". The name formations with Kal, Kalen or Calen could refer to the geological base of rock or stone. So the word Calenberg means the same as kahler Berg or "bare hill".

The following variations have been noted: dat hus to der kalenborch 1327, dat slot kalenberch 1350, ...unse del des slotes der Kalenborch 1363, to dem Kalenberge, unse Slot de Kalenberch 1406, Haus Calenberg 1661, Fürstl. Ambtshaus, Fürstl. Palladium 1663, Altes Schloß Calenberg 1730, Auf dem Alten Calenberg 1777, Alt Calenberg 1854, Alt-Kalenberg 1896.

== Location on the Calenberg ==
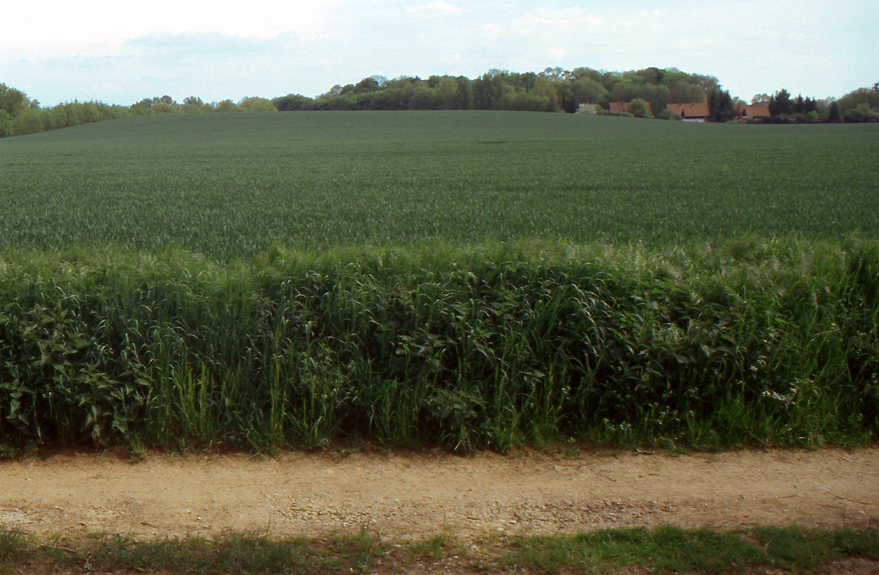
The Calenberg. In the background is Alt Calenberg with the old workers' cottages and the tree-covered ramparts of the former Calenberg Castle

The castle site stands on a low hill, the Calenberg, which is 70 m above NN. The hill was formed almost 100 million years ago at the beginning of the Upper Cretaceous during the Cenomanian stage. Before the castle was built, the Calenberg rose some 10 metres (33 ft) above the water meadows between the river arms of the Leine that existed at that time. (Note: Probable river arms are shown on the map of field names (Flurnamenkarte) sheet 6/3 Alt-Calenberg a.a.O.. They are no longer visible on aerial photographs today due to gravel quarrying.) It covered not just the site of Calenberg Castle, but extended a further 500 metres (1,600 ft) further north to the River Leine. As a result, the castle moats had to be cut over 10 metres (33 ft) deep into the layer of chalk marl. During high water the Calenberg still rises like an island in the surrounding floodwaters.

The name Calenberg clearly indicates that the chalk marl stratum was not tree-covered, but stood proud of the Leine meadows as a "bare hill". The river terrace of the Leine had, in former times, laid down gravel to the north and south of the chalk marl step, that was later covered with loess and river loam (Auelehm). The builders of the water castle used this gravel, loess and loam to build the ramparts. Stone for the foundation walls and fortifications of Calenberg Castle were extracted from a quarry on the north side of the Calenberg, which was used until the second half of the twentieth century as a rubbish tip and then covered with topsoil.

== Water castle ==
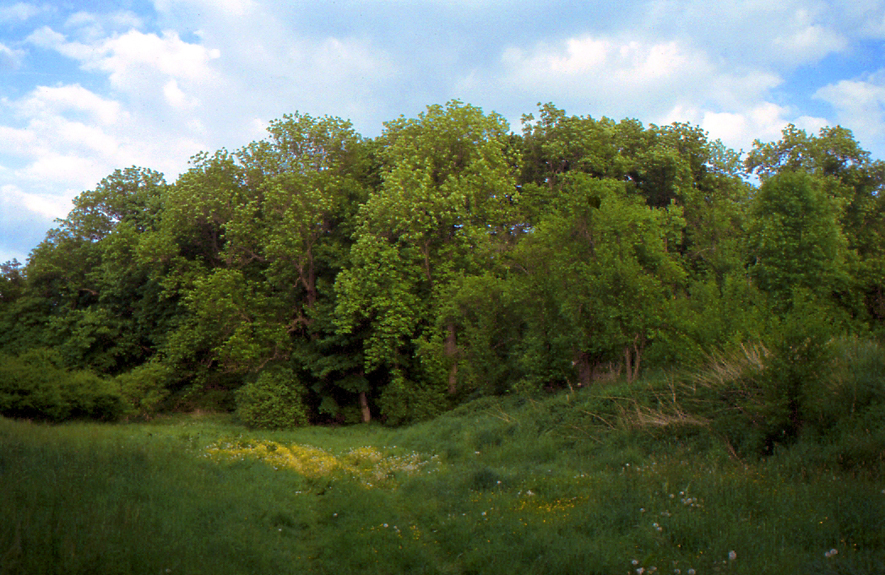
Dried-up castle moat and tree-covered ramparts of the old Calenberg Castle on the Calenberg

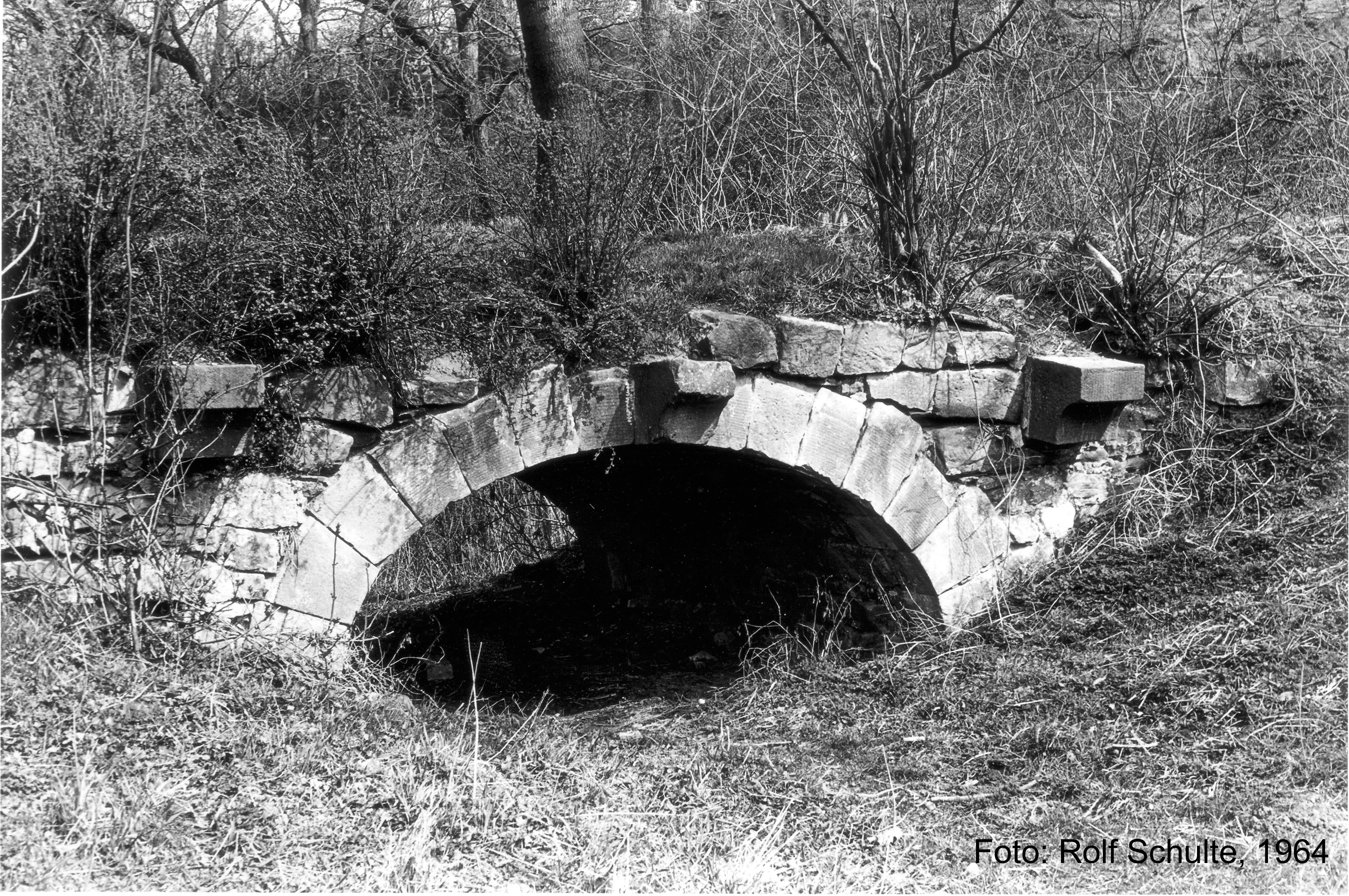
Bridge of 1757 over the dried-out castle moat. Photograph from 1964.

The old water castle was built on the island of Calenberg as a lowland fort in the middle of the River Leine, which used to form the border of the Prince-Bishopric of Hildesheim. The castle was laid out on a raised plateau about 50 by 70 metres (160 ft × 230 ft) in area. Around it was a moat, which was later refilled when the castle was rebuilt into a much larger fortification. Originally the water castle was a three-storey motte and bailey structure (Turmhügelburg) with a floor plan of 14.4 by 14.4 metres (47 ft × 47 ft). It had a residential wing to the north. The castle dominated the military road or Heerstraße from Gestorf through the Leine valley to Hildesheim.

Although the castle had an important location as a border fortification, it was enfeoffed as early as 1327 to the knight, Conrad of Saldern, due to a lack of funding. He was also permitted to establish an unfortified town to the south of the castle. The settlement of Lauenstadt, founded in 1327, never fully developed however. In 1613 it ranked last in a list of towns in the Principality of Calenberg. Until about 1900 markets were held in Lauenstadt, at which everyday items were sold in open stalls.

By 1350 the castle had been enhanced with a long west wing (32.6 by 9.6 metres or 107 by 31 feet) adjoined by another gate tower (13.9 by 13.9 metres or 46 by 46 feet). The rest of the bailey was surrounded by a curtain wall. In 1363 there was a mill belonging to the castle and a customs station on the Leine bridge.

The von Saldern family had to relinquish the castle in 1364 to Duke William because they had participated in a secret pact with the Bishop of Hildesheim.

In 1380 Calenberg Castle withstood a siege by the Bishop of Hildesheim; after which the episcopal castle of Nabershausen near Barnten was slighted. In 1371 the castle became the seat of the ducal advocates (Vögte) in the 'Grand Advocacy' (Großvogtei) of Calenberg and, in 1432, it was named as a Residenz for one of the Welf dukes. From 1405 the castle became the administrative seat of the Advocacy (Vogtei) of Calenberg.

== Fortress ==
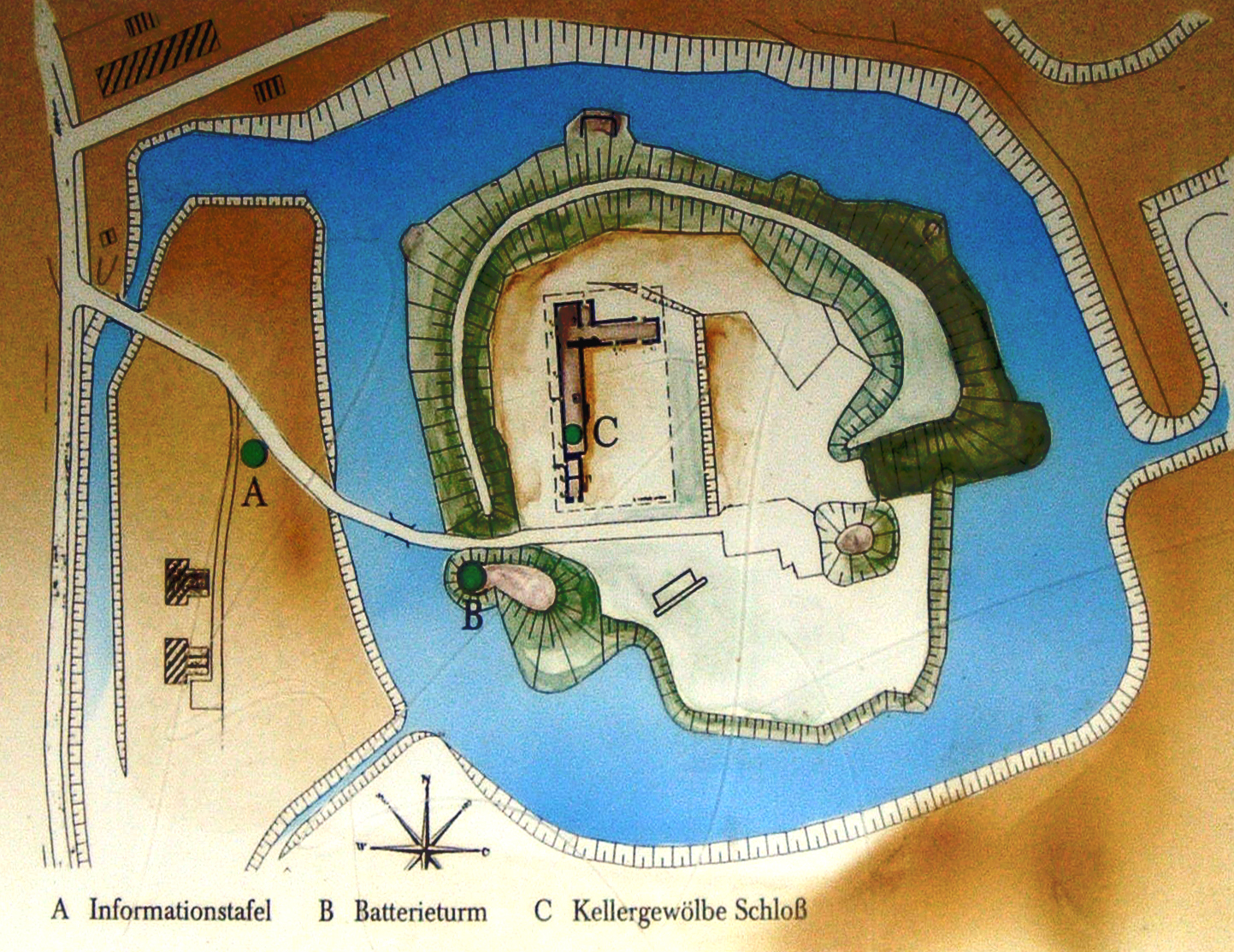
Plan of the fortress on the information board at the entrance to the Calenberg.

Following the introduction of firearms the moated castle was no longer capable of resisting attack. At the beginning of the 16th century, and before the Hildesheim Diocesan Feud, it was therefore rebuilt under Eric I into a modern fortress, accessible over two bridges. The most important measure was the construction of a 700-metre-long (2,300 ft) wall, which was to protect the castle square from gunfire. The main wall with eight stone sconces was surrounded by a 40-metre-wide (130 ft) moat, which was flooded by a channel from the Rössingbach stream. In front of the western entrance with its drawbridge, an unfortified 'island' (Vorwerksinsel) was laid out and given the field name Die Bleiche. Directly behind the bridge was the three-story battery tower, about 24 metres (79 ft) in diameter with 2-metre-thick (6.6 ft) walls and gun slits arranged in pairs. The fort was defended by seventeen guns and was thus better equipped than the towns of Göttingen and Hanover that belonged to the Principality.

The fortress of Calenberg survived several sieges. During the Great Diocesan Feud in 1519 it was besieged for three weeks without success. In the Thirty Years' War the fortress of Calenberg was besieged in 1625 for three weeks by Tilly and it was surrendered only after a mutiny by the troops. In 1632 the Welf duke, George of Brunswick-Calenberg, fighting on the Swedish side, did not initially succeed in retaking the castle despite a six-week siege. Only after his victory in the Battle of Hessisch-Oldendorf and another siege, was he able to capture the heavily damaged fortress of Calenberg in 1633.

=== Later Usage ===
The fortress helped to reduce the influence of the bishops of Hildesheim, with whom the Welfs lived in constant conflict, in the region of Hanover and to achieve territorial gains. At the start of the 16th century the water castle was converted into a manor house. But it was not big enough to host the court, and was not surrounded by a larger settlement. So it was never a palace, but more of a manor house and was only the seat of the advocacy for a limited time. The actual administrative centre of the Principality was in Neustadt. The fortress of Calenberg was, however, regarded by the princes as their ancestral home and was looked after accordingly.

In 1634, after a number of divisions of the estate, the principalities of Calenberg and Göttingen were merged into the Principality of Brunswick-Lüneburg-Celle and, after the granting of electorate status in 1692, became part of the Electorate of Hanover. In 1636, Duke George of Brunswick-Calenberg recaptured the territory for the House of Welf during the Thirty Years with the help of Swedish troops, and chose Hanover as a residence. From 1648 the manor house itself was turned back into a fortress. It then served as a garrison, from 1673 as a glass factory and then as a prison. The fortress was repaired again from 1656 to 1662. On the left bank of the river a demesne was built as seat for the administration of the Amt as well as of the castle's farmlands.

=== Imprisonment of Corvinus ===
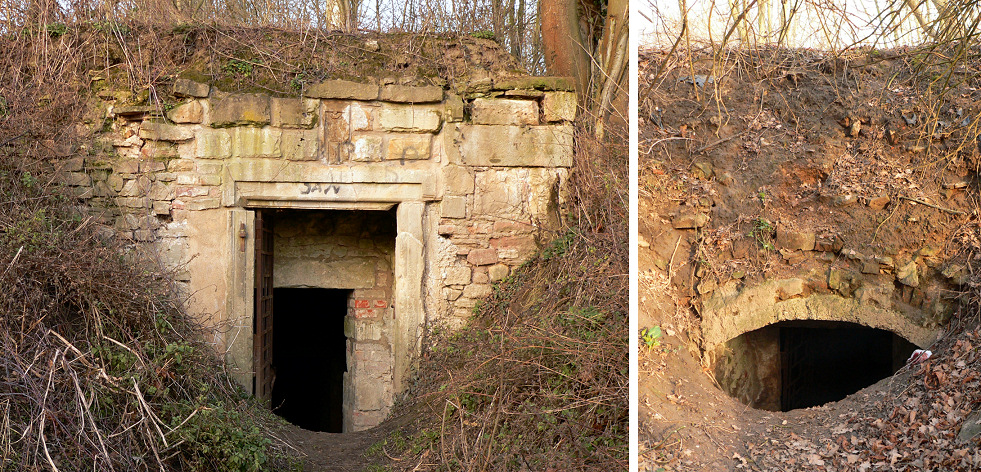
Entrances to the preserved vaulted cellars of the manor house. Left: the entrance to the Corvinus cellar, in which, according to oral tradition, Corvinus was imprisoned.

The Catholic duke, Eric II accepted in 1548 the Augsburg Interim from the Catholic Emperor. At the Lutheran synod of Münden in 1549, the Lutheran reformer, Anton Corvinus, and the Pattensen preacher, Walter Hoiker, (also Hocker), together with 140 priests, voiced their bitter opposition to the Interim.

As a result, on 2 November 1549, Eric II placed Anton Corvinus and Walter Hoiker in custody in Calenberg Fortress for contempt to force them and the other clergy to accept the Interim. The prisoners were well cared for, could receive and reply to letters and talk to visitors through an open window. After the Peace of Passau, when the Emperor declared the Interim invalid and Eric II had fallen out of favour with him, the two prisoners were released on 21 October 1552.

=== Merian copperplate ===
In 1654 Caspar Merian (1627–1686) published his copperplate of Calenberg Fortress in Topographia Germaniae Braunschweig-Lüneburg, which was based on a sketch by survey engineer, Conrad Buno. The copperplate shows a perspective view from the village of Gestorf towards Hildesheim, i.e. from northwest to southeast.

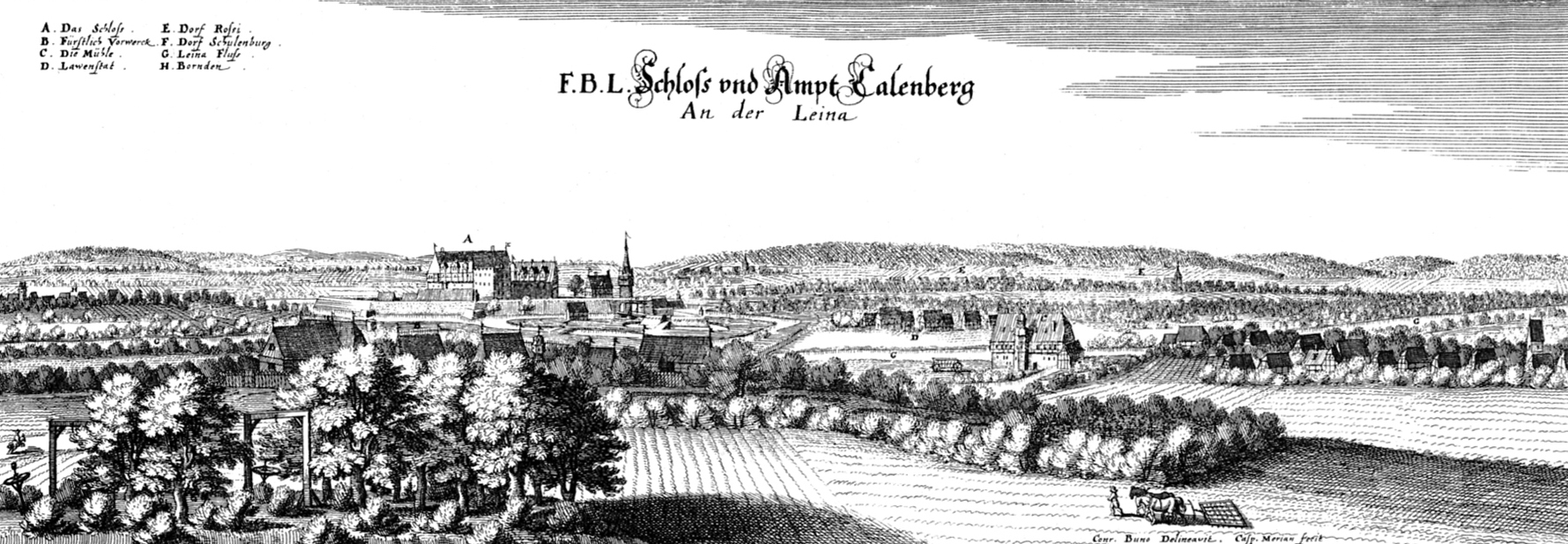
Calenberg Fortress in 1654 as a copperplate by Caspar Merian

In the left foreground stand the gallows (Das alte Gericht) and, behind them, the demesne of New Calenberg (Domäne Neues Calenberg; labelled as B. Fürstlich Vorwerck in the key), with houses of that period. In the background are the fortifications of Calenberg enclosing various buildings (A. Das Schloss) with a house for employees on the defensive island in front of the fortress. To the right of the fort are the houses of Lauenstadt (D. Lawenstat); in front of them, on the near bank of the Leine (G. Leina Fluss), is the Calenberg Mill (C. Die Mühle). In the right foreground is the village of Schulenburg (F. Dorf Schulenburg) and, behind on the other side of the Leine, the village of Rössing (E. Dorf Rossing). To the rear left is the village of Barnten (H. Bornden). The unnamed village on the right behind the fortress is Emmerke.

The place of execution, Das alte Gericht, was located north of Schulenburg's Poggenworth Pond (Poggenworthsteich) at the southern edge of the military road from Schulenburg to Gestorf (now the L 460 state road) on the site of the abandoned village of Herbergen. The gallows were later replaced by a new execution site, Das neue Gericht, which was located northeast of the present intersection of the B 3 road with the L 460.

== Fall of the fortress ==
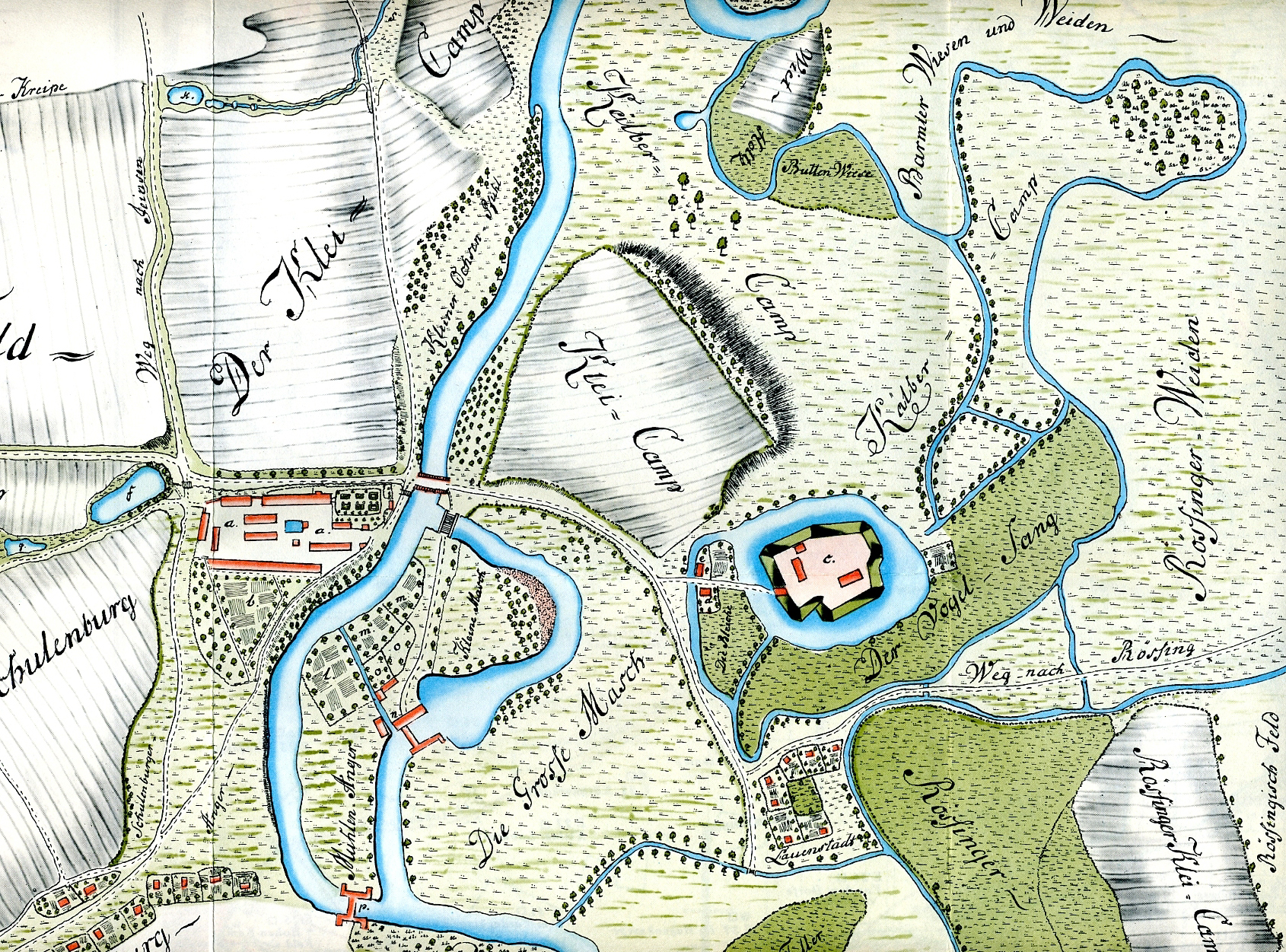
The Calenberg hill in 1771. The map is not north-oriented. Key to the original: a. Calenberg Demesne (to the left of the river); b. Kitchen and arboretum; c. Old castle of Calenberg; d. Licent–Bedienten accommodation; e. Deputat–Bedienten accommodation; f. Oehlmühle millpond; g. Little Pond; k. Posen Pond; l. The hop garden; m. Deputat garden; n. The mill; o. Garden; p. Water overshoot; q. The wells by the ponds.

After the Thirty Years' War the fortress was no longer capable against the greater ranges of guns. In addition there was also a security risk because, if enemies took possession of it, they could threaten the Calenberg Land.

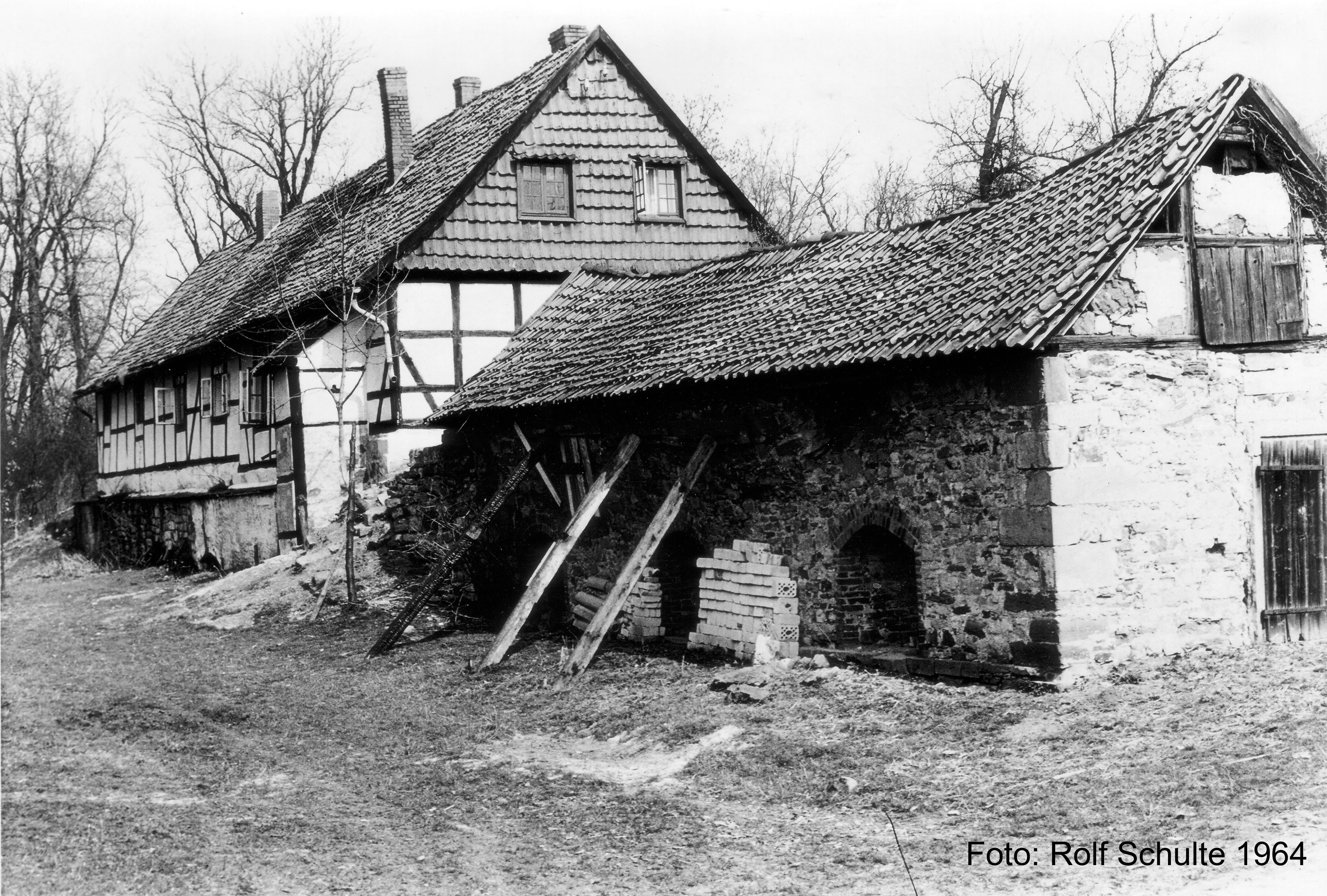
Timber-framed house and outbuilding on the cellars of the western wing of the castle. These buildings were demolished in 1981. View in 1964 from the northeast

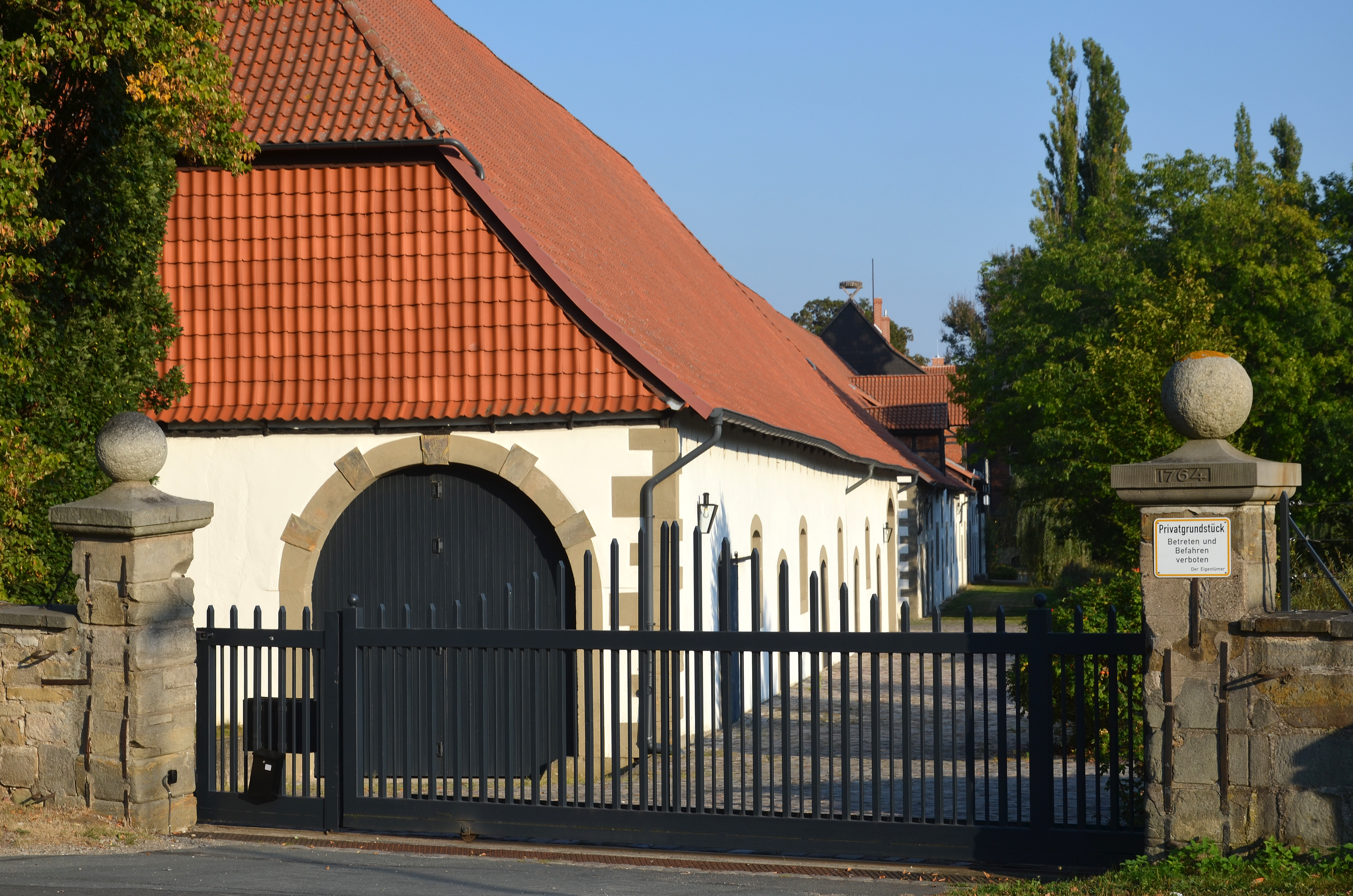
Calenberg Demesne

As a result, the castle was abandoned and, in 1690, demolished due to its dilapidated state. In 1692 Calenberg Fortress was slighted, the southern castle was removed and the moats were filled in. Consequently, the city of Hanover was fortified. In 1669 on the left bank of the Leine the desmesne of New Calenberg (Neues Calenberg) was established in the present-day Calenberg Manor House (Hausgut Calenberg) in Schulenburg, along with the then brewery of 1673 and with the Amt of Calenberg, which acted as an intermediate administration until the 19th century.

In 1765 a prison (Criminal-Gefängnis) was built in the northeastern part of the fortress site with the stones of the demolished castle. It was surrounded by protective walls and served as a jail until 1930. It was demolished before the Second World War. South of it stood the accommodation for the prison warders and the legal staff (Gerichtsboten); here there were two detention cells with barred windows. This building later served as a private house with an outbuilding to the south; it had been demolished by 1981.

A row of two half-timbered houses dating from 1830 stood centrally on the foundation of the west wing of the early 14th-century castle. To the south was a stone building, the southern cellar entrance of which still exists and is called the Corvinus Cellar (Corvinuskeller). The area lying to the east of the demolished castle was used as a garden. The buildings were occupied by three families in 1981, but became so dilapidated that they had to be completely removed in the following years. The gardens were planted with forest trees. A hydrant by the track indicates where the old buildings used to be. Although the buildings were removed, the cellars remained, several entrances were filled in, others are still open. By 1990 the ruins were restored by Rasch, a stonemasons' company from Schulenburg, using stones found on the site. One of their finds was a decorative stone that resembled a coat of arms, which was set over the lintel of the entrance to the Corvinus Cellar. In the Corvinus Cellar is the inscription "Have patience, brother".

In the 19th century King George V of Hanover built Marienburg Castle on nearby Schulenberg Hill for his wife Marie of Saxe-Altenburg. After the annexation of the Kingdom of Hanover by Prussia in 1866, Marienburg remained in private ownership while Calenberg Castle and its royal demesne became state owned. After 1920 however, following a compensation agreement, the demesne was returned to the House of Hanover, together with other property. The demesne buildings were sold in 2011, but the farmlands are still owned by the former royal family.

== Present-day ruins ==
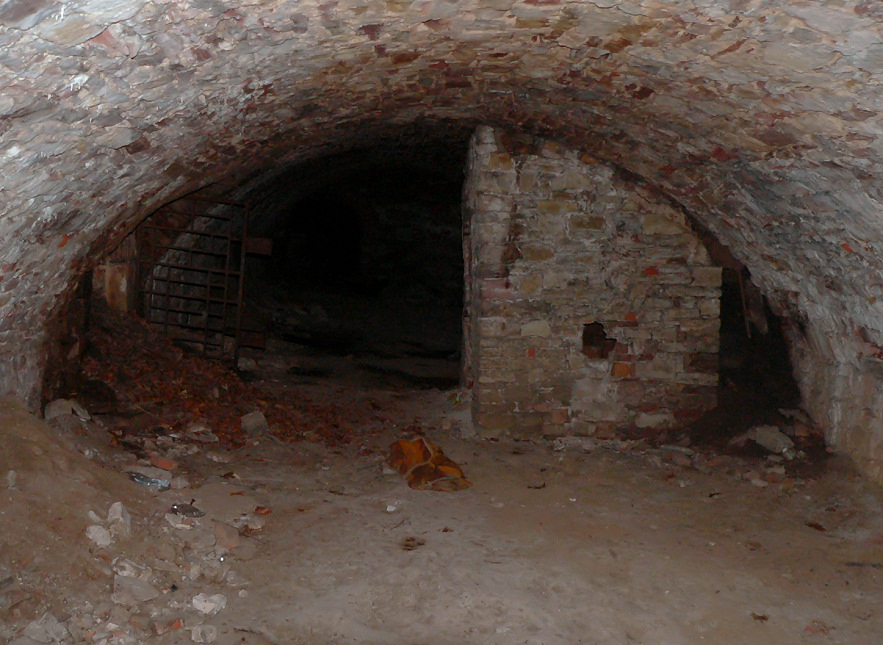
Vaulted cellar, with the stone wall of castle well on right

The remains of the fortress lie in the area of Old Calenberg, which has been part of the Calenberg-Leine Valley Protected Landscape (Landschaftsschutzgebiet Calenberger Leinetal) since 1997. Of the fortress and the motte, only the ramparts, cellars and foundations of the fort, the manor house, the Corvinus Cellar and ruins of the battery tower remain. The battery tower and its two cellars have been closed to the public since the middle of 2008.; bats hibernate in the vaulted cellars under the two wings of the castle, and from every 1 October to 30 April the hibernating animals must not be disturbed. In one vault there is a stone well, several metres deep. The underground cellars are so extensive that, on one occasion, two children that had strayed into them had to be rescued by the emergency services.

According to oral tradition there were also underground escape tunnels to Lauenstadt and the Bishopric of Hildesheim. The ramparts still exist to the northwest, north and northeast. The surrounding moats are no longer filled with water. The whole area is overgrown with trees, bushes and stinging nettles, and there are also snowdrops and wild narcissi.

As of 2007, in good weather an ecumenical church service has been held in the morning of Ascension Day in the southern part of Calenberg Castle since the end of the 20th century.

== Calenberg Bridge and Mill ==
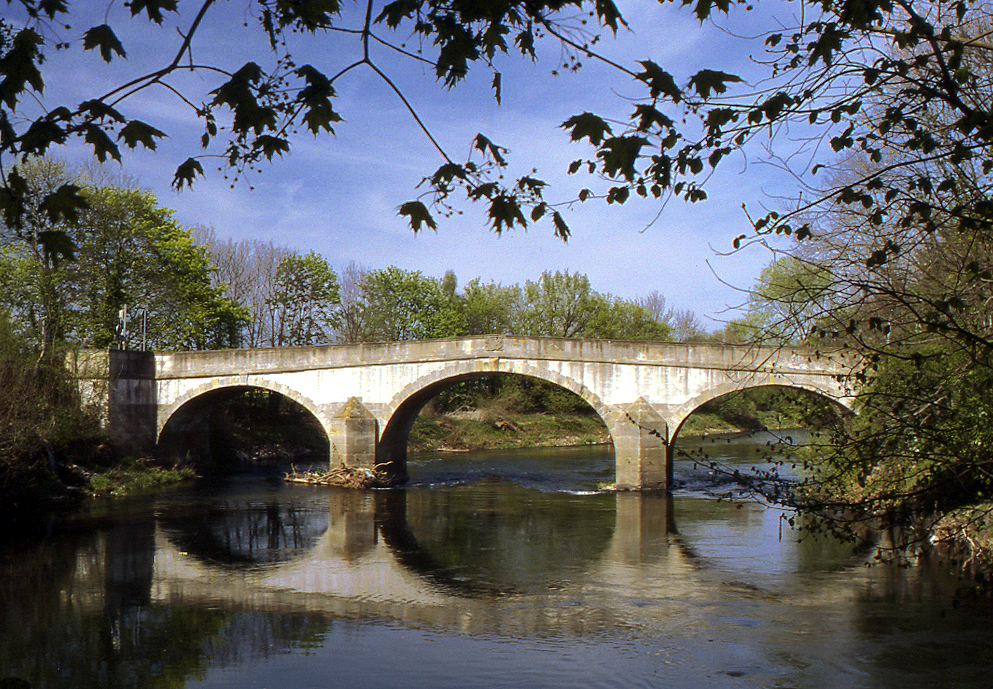
The Calenberg Bridge of 1751

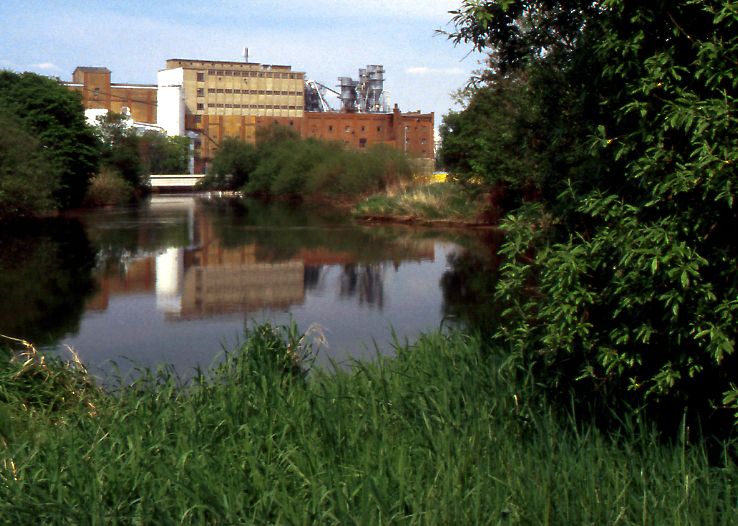
The Calenberg Mill on an island in the Leine near Schulenburg

A bridge over the River Leine between Calenberg Fortress and the village of Schulenburg is mentioned in records dating back to 1363. The existing stone bridge with three elliptical arches on two river piers was built in 1751 from chalk sandstone blocks and dated on the coat of arms stone with a monogram of King George II. It is protected by traffic lights and may only be crossed in one direction at a time. The bridge, renovated in summer 2008, is a listed monument.

At the end of the Second World War, two citizens from Adensen, Conrad Kösel and Rudolf Ohlmer, wanted to prevent German soldiers from blowing up the bridges at Marienberg and the Leine Bridge at Schulenburg. When they arrived at the Marienberg Bridge on 6 April 1945 it had already been blown up. However, together with Hans Bremer, the owner of the Calenberg Mill, they were able to prevent the Calenberg Bridge being blown up. Tragically, Conrad Kösel and Rudolf Ohlmer were shot dead in their car during the retreat on the K 506 road just before Adensen by the advancing tanks of the US Army. The Calenberg Bridge had already been prepared for demolition, but Hans Bremer had invited the demolition guard commando of the Volkssturm to vespers and entertained his guests, thereby enabling the allies to seize the bridge before it could be blown up.

The Calenberg Mill on an island in the Leine river near Schulenburg was a water mill. Its predecessor is portrayed in the 1654 Merian copperplate of Calenberg Fortress. The first Calenberg Mill, however, was located in Calenberg Castle itself.

== See also ==
- List of castles in Lower Saxony

== Sources ==
- Die Kunstdenkmale der Provinz Hannover Bd. 29: I,3 Kreis Springe. Hannover 1941, S. 30 bis 32, 191 bis 192.
- Kurt Brüning, Heinrich Schmidt (Herausgeber): Handbuch der historischen Stätten Deutschlands. Bd. 2: Niedersachsen und Bremen. 4. Aufl., Alfred Kröner Verlag, Stuttgart 1976. S. 91–93.
- Edgar Kalthoff: Die Burg und Feste Calenberg – Versuch einer Rekonstruktion. In: Burgen und Schlösser, 19 (1), 1978, S. 2-11
- Edgar Kalthoff: Die Geschichte der Burg Calenberg. In: Niedersächsisches Jahrbuch für Landesgeschichte, 50 (1978), S. 321-346
- Historisches Museum Hannover: Calenberg – Von der Burg zum Fürstentum. Hannover 1979
- Carl-Hans Hauptmeyer: Calenberg – Geschichte und Gesellschaft einer Landschaft. Hannover 1983
- Eckard Steigerwald: Pattensen. Zur Geschichte und Entwicklung der Dörfer (bis Ende des 16. Jahrhunderts). Herausgabe und Vertrieb: Stadt Pattensen 1986.
- Eckard Steigerwald: Wie wirklichkeitsgetreu ist Merians Stich von der Feste Calenberg? In: Burgen und Schlösser 1992/I, S. 23–25.
- Henner Hannig: Landkreis Hannover. Denkmaltopographie Bundesrepublik Deutschland. Baudenkmale in Niedersachsen Bd. 13.1. Verlag Friedr. Vieweg & Sohn, Braunschweig und Wiesbaden 1988. S. 128f u. 238ff.
- Eckard Steigerwald: Die Feste Calenberg: ein vergessenes Denkmal niedersächsischer Geschichte? Rotary Club Calenberg-Pattensen, Pattensen ca. 1991.
- Georg Dehio: Handbuch der Deutschen Kunstdenkmäler. Bremen, Niedersachsen. Deutscher Kunstverlag, München und Berlin 1992, ISBN 3-422-03022-0
- Margret Zimmermann, Hans Kensche: Burgen und Schlösser im Hildesheimer Land. Lax Verlag, Hildesheim, 2. Aufl. 2001.

== Maps ==
- Flurnamenkarte 1:10.000 Blatt 5/3 Gestorf des Landkreises Hannover, Abt. Kartographie, o. J. (1986).
- Flurnamenlexikon zur Flurnamenkarte, Hrsg. vom Landkreis Hannover. Bearb. Heinz Weber Teil 5,3: Gestorf. Schriftenreihe: Flurnamensammlung des Landkreises Hannover. o. J. (1986).
- Flurnamenkarte 1:10.000 Blatt 6/3 Alt-Calenberg des Landkreises Hannover, Abt. Kartographie, o. J. (1981).
- Flurnamenlexikon zur Flurnamenkarte, Hrsg. vom Landkreis Hannover. Bearb. Heinz Weber Teil 6,3: Alt-Calenberg. Schriftenreihe: Flurnamensammlung des Landkreises Hannover. o. J. (1987).

== Archives ==
- GSTA Berlin, HA STA Königsberg, HBA A2 1584–1586 (K. 92) Inventarium 3: Calenberg.
- Celle Br 2 Nr. 335, Br 57 Nr. 126.
- HSTA Düsseldorf, Werden Akten V d, Nr. 1, Bl. 2.
- Nds. Hauptstaatsarchiv Hannover, Cal Br 2 Nr. 78 + 335, Cal Br 8 Nr. 944, Cal Br 21, 2869, Hann 74 Cal. Nr. 93 + 1302 + 1303 + 1342, Hann 76 c B Nr. 101, Hann 88A Nr. 989.
