= Hann. Münden =

- Town
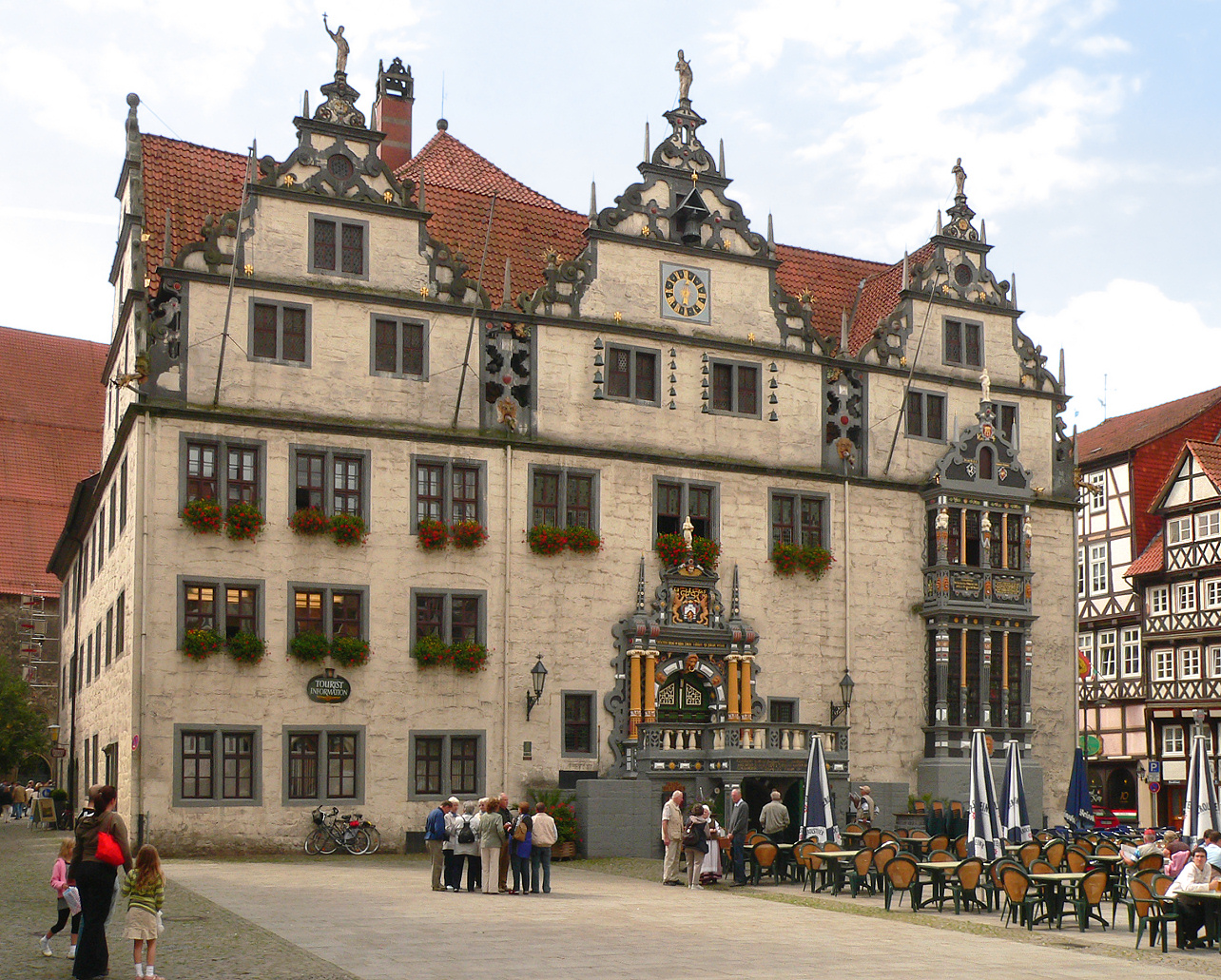
- Town hall

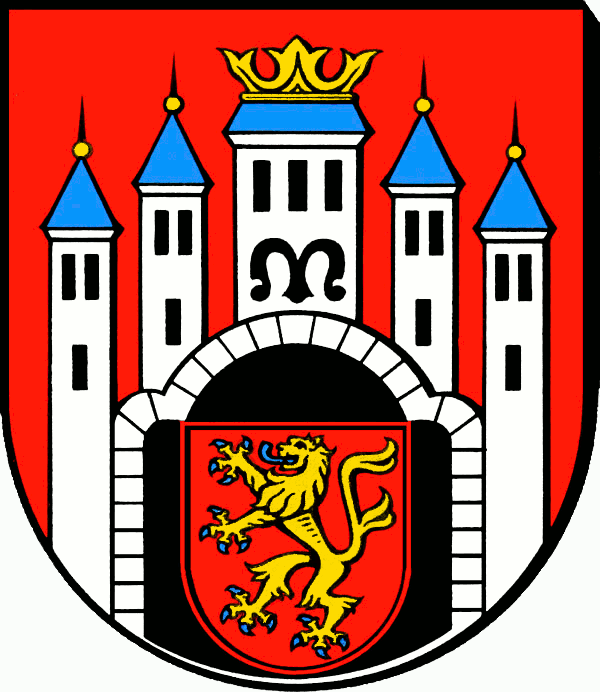
- Coat of arms

- Location of Hann. Münden within Göttingen district
- Interactive map of Hann. Münden
- Location within Germany Location within Lower Saxony
- Coordinates: 51°25′N 09°39′E
- Country: Germany
- State: Lower Saxony
- District: Göttingen
- Subdivisions: 11

Government
  - Mayor (2021–26): Tobias Dannenberg (CDU)

Area
  - Total: 121.17 km^{2} (46.78 sq mi)
- Elevation: 123 m (404 ft)

Population (2025-12-31)
  - Total: 23,367
  - Density: 192.84/km^{2} (499.47/sq mi)
- Time zone: UTC+01:00 (CET)
  - Summer (DST): UTC+02:00 (CEST)
- Postal codes: 34346
- Dialling codes: 05541
- Vehicle registration: GÖ, DUD, HMÜ
- Website: www.hann.muenden.de

Hann. Münden (German pronunciation: [han ˈmʏndn̩]; short for Hannoversch Münden [haˈnoːfɐʃ ˈmʏndn̩]) is a town in Lower Saxony, Germany. Münden lies in the district of Göttingen at the confluence of the Fulda and Werra rivers, which join to form the Weser. It has about 24,000 inhabitants (2013). It is famous for its half-timbered houses, some of them more than 600 years old. There are 10 million cobblestones around the town.

== History ==
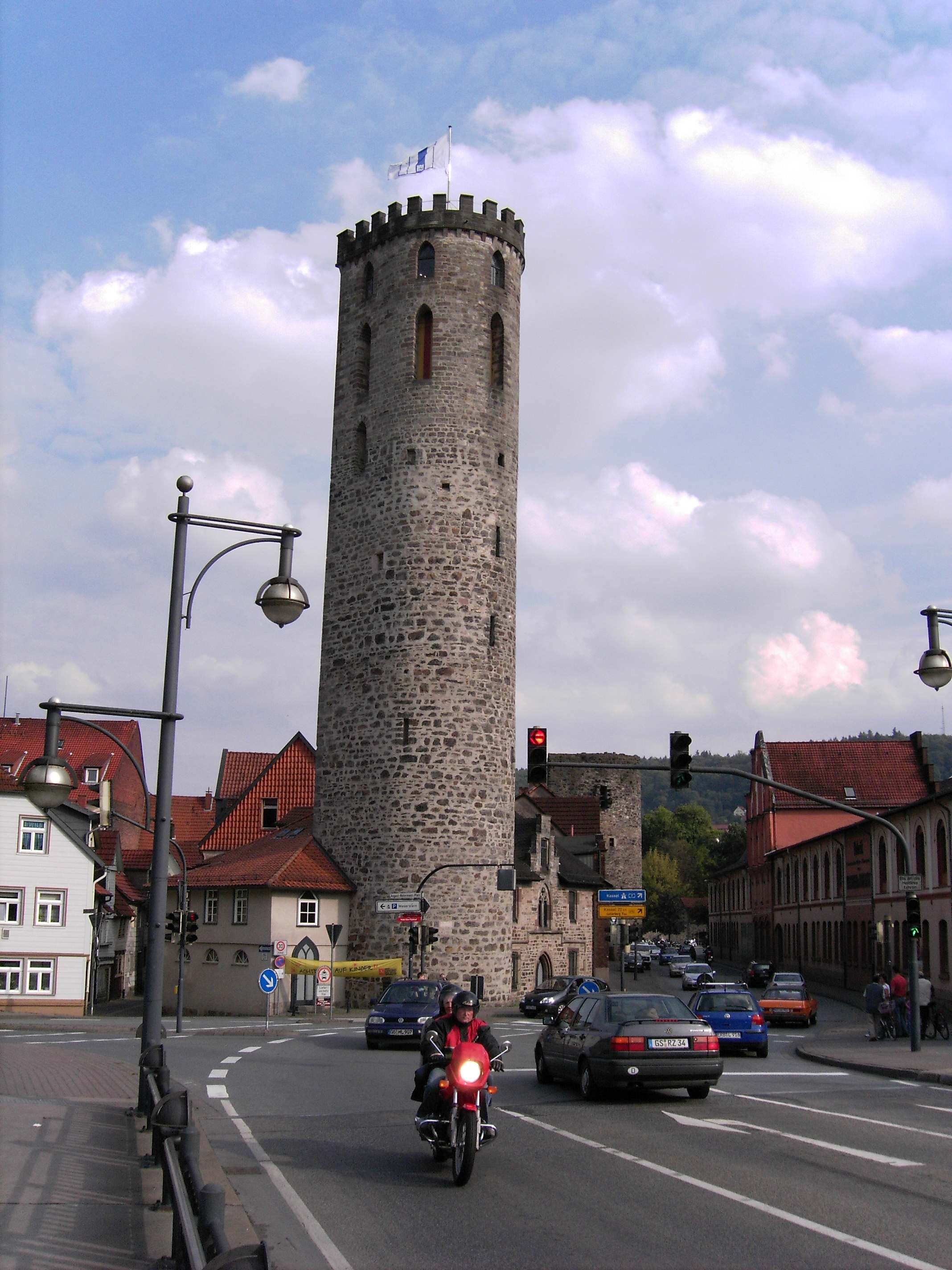
Wall Tower Fährenpfortenturm, a shot tower from 1848-1975, now housing an industry museum

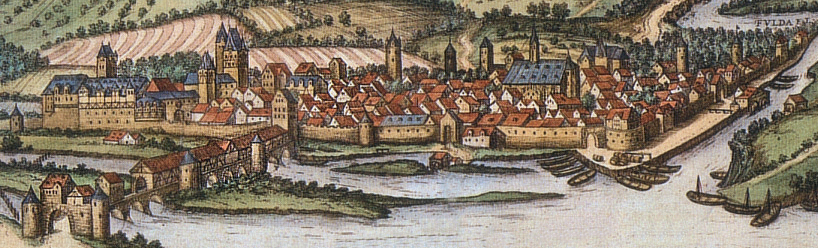
Hann. Münden in the 16th century

The place is first mentioned in the deeds of donation of Gimundi to the abbey of Fulda, in 802. The town's name means "confluence" in old German; the prefix Hannoversch, or "Hanoverian", was added in the 19th century to help distinguish the town from its similarly-named Prussian neighbour, Minden.

City rights might have been granted during the latter half of the 12th century.

The French inventor Denis Papin built a steam-pump-powered paddlewheel boat, probably pedal-driven in 1704, and as a demonstration used it to navigate down the Fulda River from Kassel to Münden in 1707.

Hann. Münden was the site of the Royal Prussian Academy of Forestry: the city's botanical gardens with many different trees were primarily established for this academy. Later the academy was merged into the University of Göttingen, moving to a new building on the main campus in 1970.

== Main sights ==
Many tourists visit the city to see some 700 of its well-preserved half-timbered medieval houses.

The large Lutheran church of St Blasius (14th–15th centuries), in Gothic style, contains the sarcophagus of Duke Eric I of Brunswick-Calenberg (d. 1540).

Other sights include:

- Renaissance Town Hall, built in the 14th century (now the central Gothic hall remains) with a façade renewed between 1603 and 1618.
- Old Werrabrücke, the bridge over the Werra river: one of the oldest stone bridges in the country
- Forstbotanischer Garten in Hannoversch Münden, an arboretum
- Remains of the medieval 12th century city walls (renewed in the 15th century)
- Tillyschanze, an observation tower built from 1881 to 1885 by citizens of the town in memory of the siege of the town by Count Tilly in 1626.
- Welfenschloss, originally built by Duke Eric I in the Gothic style in 1501, as both a residence and administrative center. After its destruction by a fire in 1560, Duke Eric II had it rebuilt in Weser Renaissance style. The southern wing was again destroyed by a fire in 1849, but not rebuilt.

== Notable people ==
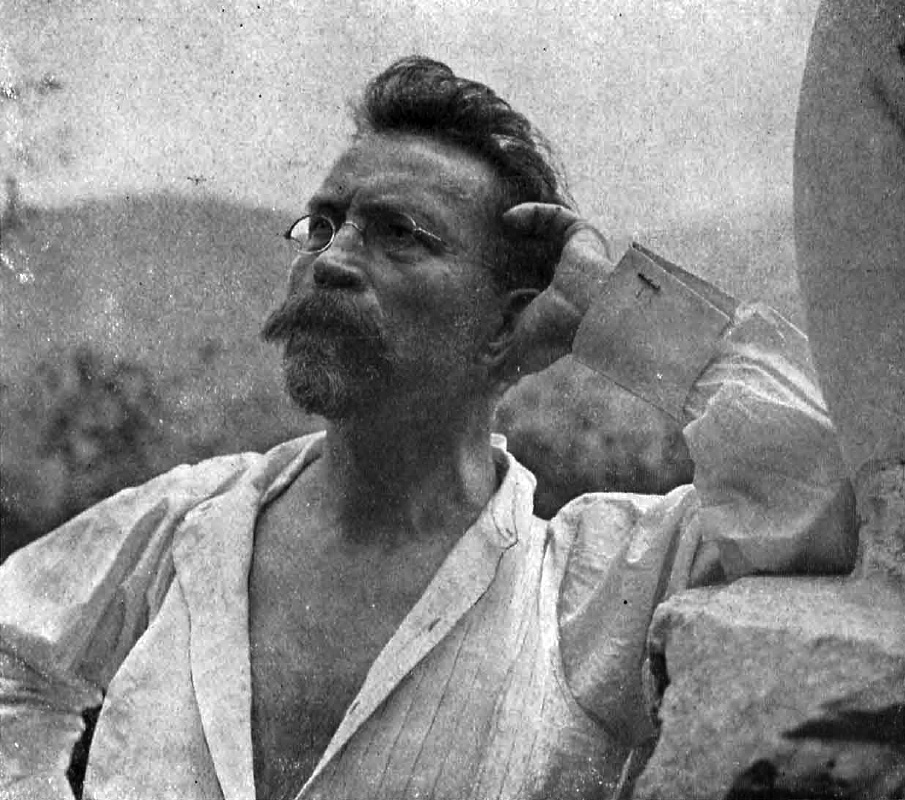
Gustav Eberlein, 1903

- Anna Maria of Brunswick-Calenberg-Göttingen (1532–1568), duchess of Brunswick-Lüneburg
- Ludolph Büsinck (1600–1669), wood-engraver, local customs administrator
- Hermann Friedrich Teichmeyer (1685–1746), forensics physician and botanist
- Georg Friedrich Grotefend (1775–1853), epigraphist and philologist; he deciphered cuneiform.
- Christian Kalkbrenner (1755–1806), Kapellmeister, violinist, organ and keyboard player and composer.
- Eduard Huschke (1801–1886), jurist and authority on church government.
- Ferdinand Wüstenfeld (1808–1899), orientalist and literary historian of Arabic literature
- Heinrich Christian Burckhardt (1811–1879), forest scientist and teacher of the local forest school
- Emma Jacobina Christiana Marwedel (1818–1893), a German-American educator, used the ideas of Friedrich Fröbel
- Ernst Wollweber (1898–1967), politician SED, Minister for State Security of the GDR
- Gustav Eberlein (1847–1926), sculptor, lived and worked here
- Anne-Marie von Schutzbar genannt Milchling (1903–1991), second wife of Nikolaus, Hereditary Grand Duke of Oldenburg
- Christa Schroeder (1908–1984), one of Adolf Hitler's personal secretaries before and during World War II
- Adam von Trott zu Solz (1909–1944), diplomat, resistance fighter during the Nazi period, studied here 1922–1927
- Hanne Wieder (1925–1990), cabaret artist, singer, TV and film actress.
- Alexander Strehmel (born 1968), football manager and a former player, played 414 games
- Niclas Huschenbeth (born 1992), chess grandmaster
- Felicitas Rauch (born 1996), footballer; played 36 games for the Germany women's national football team

== Twin towns – sister cities ==
Hann. Münden is twinned with:

- Suresnes, France (1959)
- Holon, Israel (1988)
- Chełmno, Poland (1992)

== See also ==
- Hedemünden
- Metropolitan region Hannover-Braunschweig-Göttingen-Wolfsburg
