= Landestrost Castle =

Castle in Neustadt am Rübenberge, Germany

Coordinates: 52°30′09″N 9°27′46″E

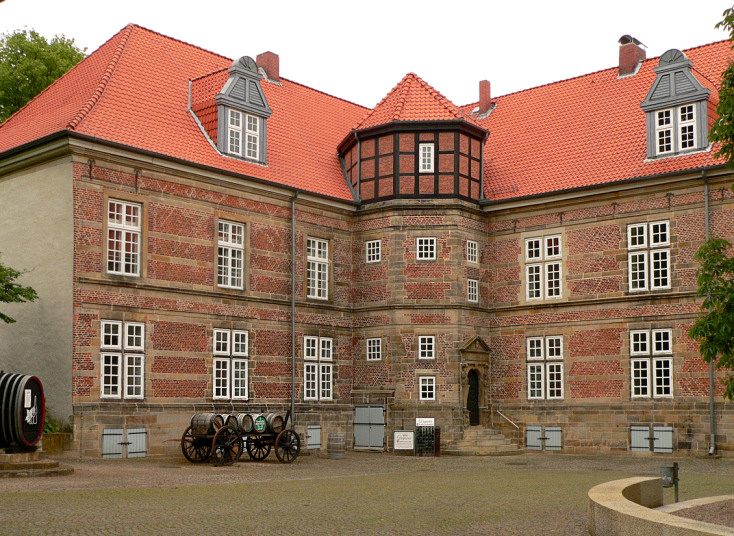
Wing of the castle with its Sekt cellar

Landestrost Castle (German: Schloss Landestrost) is a castle in the Weser Renaissance style that was built between 1573 and 1584 in Neustadt am Rübenberge in the north German state of Lower Saxony. Integrated into fortifications, together with the town, it developed into an urban fortress typical of the 16th century. The castle was the representative residence and administrative headquarters of Eric II of Brunswick-Lüneburg. During its construction period from 1574 he renamed the town of Neustadt as Landestrost, something which was reverted after his death in 1584.

== General references ==
- Veronica Albrink: „Große Pracht führen über Vermögen …“. Die Bauten und die Finanzen Erichs des Jüngeren von Braunschweig-Calenberg (1546-1584); in: Der Weserraum zwischen 1500 und 1650. Gesellschaft, Wirtschaft und Kultur in der frühen Neuzeit, hrsg. vom Institut für Architektur-, Kunst- und Kulturgeschichte in Nord- und Westdeutschland beim Weserrenaissance-Museum Schloss Brake, Marburg 1993, ISBN 3-89445-138-6
- Wolfgang Kunze: Leben und Bauten Herzog Erichs II. von Braunschweig-Lüneburg. Katalog zur historischen Ausstellung im Schloss Landestrost, Neustadt am Rübenberge; Hannover 1993
- Burkhard Rühling: Festung und Schloß Landestrost, eine "Architectura militaris" - und "civilis" der Renaissance zu Neustadt am Rübenberge, Hannover 1988, Dissertation
- Ernst Andreas Friedrich: Wenn Steine reden könnten, Band II, Landbuch-Verlag, Hannover 1992, ISBN 3-7842-0479-1
