= Barnim X =

- Duke of Pomerania
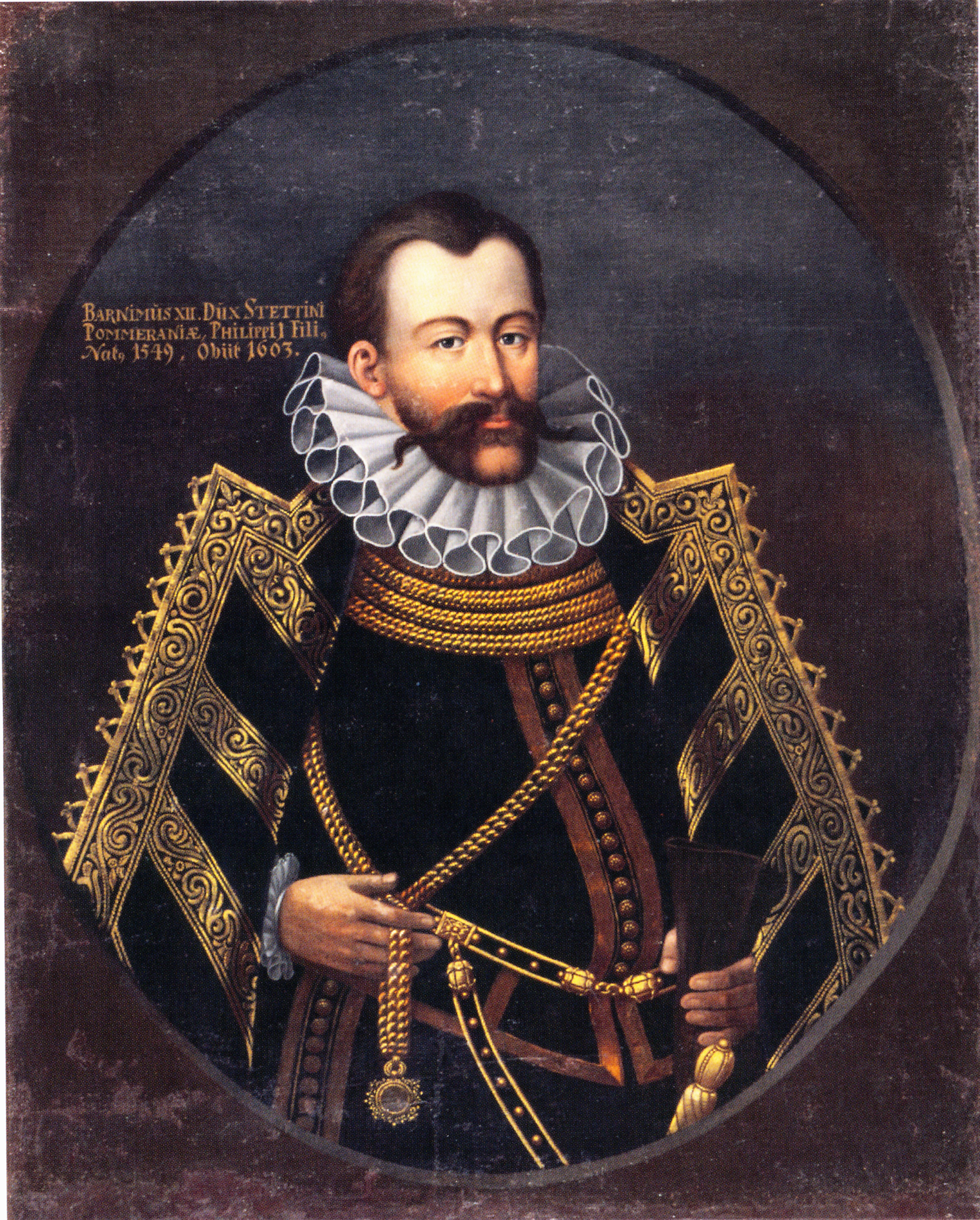
- Born: 15 February 1549; Wolgast
- Died: 1 September 1603 (aged 54); Szczecin
- Spouse: Anna Maria of Brandenburg
- House: House of Griffin
- Father: Philip I of Pomerania-Wolgast
- Mother: Maria of Saxony

Barnim X, or according to another account Barnim XII (15 February 1549, in Wolgast – 1 September 1603, in Szczecin) was a duke of Pomerania and a member of the House of Griffins. He administered from 1569, the Rügenwalde district. From 1600 until his death, he ruled in Pomerania-Stettin.

== Life ==
Barnim was the sixth child of Duke Philip I of Pomerania-Wolgast and his wife Maria of Saxony, Duchess of Pomerania. Philip died in 1560 and was survived by five of his sons; in addition to Barnim, they were his older brothers John Frederick (1542–1600), Bogislaw XIII (1544–1606) and Ernest Louis (1545–1592) and Barnim's younger brother Casimir VI (1557–1605). A guardianship government was set up for all the brothers. It consisted of the Lord Chamberlain Ulrich von Schwerin as a regent and a regency council of eleven people.

Barnim and his brother Ernest Louis studied from 1563 at the University of Wittenberg, where they lived until 1565 at the home of a Martin Luther, the son of the reformer Martin Luther. In Wittenberg he served as Rector in the summer semester of 1564.

In 1569 government in Pomerania was reorganized. Duke Barnim IX, who had no surviving sons, abdicated in favour of his second cousins John Frederick and Barnim X. Barnim waived the co-regency and agreed with his brother that he would rule the district of Rügenwalde. On 25 July 1569, the division of Pomerania was settled in the Treaty of Jasenitz.

Also in 1569, a marriage with a Polish princess was planned, but this did not come about. In Rügenwalde Barnim reigned since 1569 in quiet seclusion with reasonable economy. In 1581 he married Anna Maria of Brandenburg, a daughter of Elector John George of Brandenburg. The marriage produced no children.

After John Frederick's death of in 1600 Barnim succeeded him as ruler of Pomerania-Stettin. In 1602 he moved from Rügenwalde to the capital city of Stettin. In Rügenwalde, he was succeeded by his younger brother Casimir VI.

Barnim didn't enjoy governing Pomerania-Stettin. John Frederick had lived beyond his means, leaving substantial debts and districts pledged to his creditors. Barnim cut expenses, which made him unpopular. He died on 1 September 1603 in Stettin, and was buried in the Castle Church in Stettin. He left no children. His widow Anna Maria died in 1618 in her Wittum in Wolin.

Normally, Barnim's younger brother Casimir would have succeeded him as ruler of Pomerania-Stettin. However, Casimir in decided favour of his older brother Bogislaw XIII, who, in turn, appointed his son Philip II as Regent.

== Numeral ==
Counting the rulers of the House of Griffins has always been complicated. From ancient times there were differences, which caused some confusion. The modern interpretation of Barnim as "the tenth" results if one counts only the members of the House of Griffins, who reached adulthood. If one counts even with those who deceased as a child, he would be Barnim XII. This numeral was common in older literature.

== Ancestors ==
Ancestors of Barnim X

16. Eric II, Duke of Pomerania
8. Bogislaw X, Duke of Pomerania
17. Sophia of Pomerania-Stolp
4. George I, Duke of Pomerania
18. Casimir IV Jagiellon
9. Anna Jagiellonica
19. Elisabeth of Austria
2. Philip I, Duke of Pomerania
20. Louis IV, Elector Palatine
10. Philip, Elector Palatine
21. Margarete of Savoy
5. Amalie of the Palatinate
22. Louis IX, Duke of Bavaria
11. Margaret of Bavaria
23. Amalia of Saxony
1. Barnim X, Duke of Pomerania
24. Frederick II, Elector of Saxony
12. Ernest, Elector of Saxony
25. Margaret of Austria
6. John, Elector of Saxony
26. Albert III, Duke of Bavaria
13. Elisabeth of Bavaria
27. Anna of Brunswick-Grubenhagen
3. Maria of Saxony
28. George I, Prince of Anhalt-Dessau
14. Waldemar VI, Prince of Anhalt-Köthen
29. Sophie of Hohnstein
7. Margaret of Anhalt-Köthen
30. Günther XXXVI, Count of Schwarzburg
15. Margarethe of Schwarzburg-Blankenburg
31. Margaret of Henneberg-Schleusingen

== See also ==
- House of Griffins

== Footnotes ==
Barnim X House of Pomerania Born: 15 February 1549 Died: 1 September 1603
Regnal titles
Preceded by Philip I	Dukes of Pomerania-Wolgast altogether under tutelage until 1567; 1560–1592 with his brothers Bogislaw XIII (1560–1569); John Frederick (1560–1569); Ernest Louis (1560–1592)	Succeeded by Ernest Louis
Preceded by John Frederick	Duke of Pomerania-Stettin; 1600-1603	Succeeded by Bogislaw XIII
