= Thomas Kantzow =

Pomeranian Chronicler

Thomas Kantzow (died 1542) was a chronicler in the Duchy of Pomerania. He studied at the universities of Rostock and Wittenberg, and was a secretary of the Pomeranian dukes. His manuscripts, rediscovered in 1729, 1832 and 1973, are written in Low German and Standard German language, and were printed in the 19th and 20th centuries. They contain a Low German and three Standard German chronicles covering the history of Pomerania until 1536.

== Biography ==
Kantzow was born in Stralsund. His year of birth is uncertain, a date around 1505 is suggested by Kosegarten (1842) and in the ADB. No reports about his parents and his childhood survived.

The earliest report of Kantzow is in the University of Rostock's matriculae. This entry covers a matriculation period from 29 September 1525 to 1 April 1526 and reads "Thomas Cantzouw [de] Szundensis". Kantzow's matriculation was accordingly dated to "ao. 1525" by Kosegarten, to "probably 1525" in the ADB, to 1526 in the NDB and to "verifiably 1526" by Berger (2001). In Rostock, he probably graduated as a magister of theology before he is reported as a secretary of the Pomeranian dukes in 1528 and thereafter. Until 1532, Kantzow was secretary of the dukes Barnim IX and George I at the court in Stettin (now Szczecin), but followed Philip I to the court in Wolgast after the duchy was partitioned between Barnim IX and Philipp I, nephew of the deceased George I. As a ducal secretary, Kantzow participated in the implementation of the Protestant Reformation in Pomerania.

In the spring of 1538, Kantzow was matriculated at the University of Wittenberg, probably as a member of Pomeranian count Ludwig von Everstein's entourage. In Wittenberg, Kantzow was instructed by rector Philipp Melanchthon while upholding contacts to Pomerania. He continued to hold several prebendaries and benefices, which he had obtained from the Pomeranian dukes for his secretary services. In 1542, he left Wittenberg due to an illness and on 25 September died on his way home in Stettin, where he was buried in St. Mary's church.

== Chronicles ==
In contrast to Johannes Bugenhagen, who in 1518 based his Latin Pomerania on a limited amount of sources from abbeys and printed sources, Kantzow also had access to the extensive ducal archives, where he gathered most of the information for his chronicles, and further derived historiographic information from archeological remnants, inscriptions, coins, folklore, eyewitness accounts and own experiences. The table below provides an overview of the major chronicles written by Kantzow:

Manuscripts					Print editions	
Manuscript title	Year written	Language	Archive		Print edition title	Online
Fragmenta der pamerischen geschichte	before 1538	Low German	Fragm. I	Von Löper (Loeper) Collection; Archiwum Panstwowe w Szczecinie (1948-)*	Böhmer, Wilhelm (ed.): Thomas Kantzows Chronik von Pommern in niederdeutscher Mundart sammt einer Auswahl aus den übrigen ungedruckten Schriften desselben, Stettin 1835.	Böhmer (ed.) (1835) at books.google.com
Fragmenta der pamerischen geschichte	before 1538	Low German	Fragm. I	Von Löper (Loeper) Collection; Archiwum Panstwowe w Szczecinie (1948-)*	Gaebel, Georg (ed.): Des Thomas Kantzows Chronik von Pommern in niederdeutscher Mundart, Stettin 1929.	
Fragmenta der pamerischen geschichte	before 1538	Low German	Fragm. I	Von Löper (Loeper) Collection; Archiwum Panstwowe w Szczecinie (1948-)*	Böhmer, Wilhelm (ed.): Thomas Kantzows Chronik von Pommern in niederdeutscher Mundart sammt einer Auswahl aus den übrigen ungedruckten Schriften desselben, Vaduz/Walluf 1973 (unchanged reprint of the 1835 edition).	
Ursprunck, Altheit vnd Geschicht der Volcker vnd Lande Pomern, Cassuben, Wenden vnd Rügen	before 1538	Standard German	Fragm. III	Von Löper (Loeper) Collection; Archiwum Panstwowe w Szczecinie (1948-)*	Medem, Fr. L. B. (ed.): Thomas Kanzow's Chronik von Pommern in hochdeutscher Sprache, Anklam 1841.	Medem (ed.) (1841) at books.google.com
Ursprunck, Altheit vnd Geschicht der Volcker vnd Lande Pomern, Cassuben, Wenden vnd Rügen	before 1538	Standard German	Fragm. III	Von Löper (Loeper) Collection; Archiwum Panstwowe w Szczecinie (1948-)*	Gaebel, Georg (ed.): Des Thomas Kantzow Chronik von Pommern in hochdeutscher Mundart, vol. II, Stettin 1898.	Gaebel (ed.) (1898) at Kuyavian-Pomeranian Digital Library
Ursprunck, altheit vnd geschicht der volcker vnd lande Pomern, Cassuben, Wenden vnd Rhügen	before 1542	Standard German	Mildahn codex (Cod. Mild.) = Codex Putbussensis	Putbus (1842-?)	Gaebel, Georg (ed.): Des Thomas Kantzow Chronik von Pommern in hochdeutscher Mundart, vol. I, Stettin 1897.	Gaebel (ed.) (1897) at Kuyavian-Pomeranian Digital Library
Ursprunck, altheit vnd geschicht der volcker vnd lande Pomern, Cassuben, Wenden vnd Rhügen	before 1542	Standard German	Schwartz codex (Cod. Schw.)	University of Greifswald (1729-)	Kosegarten, Ludwig (ed.): Pomerania oder Ursprunck, Altheit und Geschicht der Völcker und Lande Pomern, Caßuben, Wenden, Stettin, Rhügen, Greifswald 1816.	Volume I of Kosegarten (ed.) (1816) at Kuyavian-Pomeranian Digital Library; Volume II of Kosegarten (ed.) (1816) at Kuyavian-Pomeranian Digital Library
Pomerania, Ursprunck, Aldtheitt vnd Geschicht der Volcker und Lande Pommern, Cassuben, Wenden, Stettin vnd Rugenn	before 1542	Standard German			Gaebel, Georg (ed.): Pomerania. Eine pommersche Chronik aus dem sechzehnten Jahrhundert, Stettin 1908.	
Pomerania, Ursprunck, Aldtheitt vnd Geschicht der Volcker und Lande Pommern, Cassuben, Wenden, Stettin vnd Rugenn	before 1542	Standard German	Thott 644 Fol.	Danish National Archives, Copenhagen		
*Von Löper (Loeper) Collection: Löpersche Sammlung Stramehl (-1834); Gesellschaft für pommersche Geschichte und Altertumskunde Stettin (1834-1855); "Sammlung Samuel Gottlieb Loeper", Provinzialarchiv Stettin (1855-1942); war-time evacuation to Martenthin and West Germany, British Zone (1942-1948); Archiwum Panstwowe w Szczecinie (1948-).

=== Fragmenta der pamerischen geschichte ===
The first chronicle written by Kantzow was Fragmenta der pamerischen geschichte, full title: Fragmenta der pamerischen geschichte, vth welcker (so man de tide recht ordent, vnd dat jennige wat vnrecht ist recht maket) men wol einen guden wech tho einer Croniken hebben konde (English translation: "Fragments of the Pomeranian History, from which (if one orders the time properly, and makes right what is not right) one may well gain a good access to a chronicle"). Wilhelm Böhmer, teacher in Stettin and member of the Society for Pomeranian History and Antiquity Studies, rediscovered the handwritten chronicle in landlord von Löper's library in Stramehl (now Strzmiele) in 1832. In 1835, Böhmer published the transliterated script in a printed book titled Thomas Kantzows Chronik von Pommern in niederdeutscher Mundart sammt einer Auswahl aus den übrigen ungedruckten Schriften desselben (English translation: "Thomas Kantzow's chronicle of Pomerania in Low German tongue including a selection of further unprinted scripts of the same [author]"), which did not alter Kantzow's spelling. In the preface, Böhmer postulates that the chronicle was written after 1531 or 1532, and a few years before 1538, a determination also followed by Berger (2001). In ADB and NDB, a date prior to 1538 is assumed. Kantzow's friend Nicolaus (also Niklaus) Klempzen (also Klemptzen) had added a note to the original manuscript's title reading "by Thomas Kantzow anno 1538", also a second front page was attached to Kantzow's original one, which Böhmer assumed to originate from the ducal chancellory, which read "First volume of fragments, from which deceased Thomas Kantzow has written the Chronicon Pomeraniae", written in Fraktur letters, with "1538" added in another handwriting.

The chronicle, written in Pomeranian Low German, covers the history of Pomerania prior to 1536, with the first part beginning with the death of duke Eric II in 1459 and ending in 1536, and a second and third part beginning in the Slavic period and ending in 1459. While overall the chronicle is not as detailed as later works of Kantzow, it offers a much more comprehensive coverage of the years 1523 to 1536, when Pomerania became Lutheran. Part of the work remains unfinished.

=== Ursprunck, Altheit vnd Geschicht der Volcker vnd Lande Pomern, Cassuben, Wenden vnd Rügen ===
The second chronicle written by Kantzow was the Standard German variant of the abovementioned Low German chronicle, written before 1538 and also rediscovered by Böhmer in von Löper's library. The title Ursprunck, Altheit vnd Geschicht der Volcker vnd Lande Pomern, Cassuben, Wenden vnd Rügen (English translation: "Origin, oldness and history of the peoples and lands of Pomerania(ns), Cashubia(ns), Wendland (resp. Wends) and Rügen") was proposed by Kosegarten, who derived it from the preface in Kantzow's manuscript.

While the Low German chronicle was not structured, the Standard German chronicle is divided into eleven books, the sixth of which is missing in the manuscript. It is not simply a translation of its Low German counterpart, but is more comprehensive, while lacking information about the period after the death of Bogislaw X in 1523. Standard German was chosen over Low German to reach a wider audience, and because the court of Philipp I, who had been raised in the High German-speaking Electorate of the Palatinate, adopted Standard German as its official language at about the same time the chronicle was written.

An edition of the manuscript was first printed by Baron von Medem in 1841 as Thomas Kantzows Chronik von Pommern in hochdeutscher Sprache (English translation: "Thomas Kantzow's chronicle of Pomerania in Standard German language"). In the edition, von Medem changed Kantzow's spelling to resemble the contemporary one, and filled incomplete parts with fragments of other chronicles of Kantzow.

=== Ursprunck, altheit vnd geschicht der volcker vnd lande Pomern, Cassuben, Wenden vnd Rhügen ===
The chronicle Ursprunck, altheit vnd geschicht der volcker vnd lande Pomern, Cassuben, Wenden vnd Rhügen (same translation as above) was written between 1538 and 1542 and consists of 14 books. Though in part identical with the first Standard German chronicle, it is more comprehensive, has an abundance of sidenotes, yet is also unfinished. Kantzow's manuscript was discovered in 1729 by Albert Schwartz, professor at the University of Greifswald, in Zudar, where it was in the possession of the children of deceased pastor Joachim Wildahn. Schwartz made a copy which was stored in the library of the university, In 1816, Hans Gottfried Ludwig Kosegarten published a printed edition of Schwartz's copy titled Pomerania oder Ursprunck, Altheit und Geschicht der Völcker und Lande Pomern, Caßuben, Wenden, Stettin, Rhügen. Mildahn's original had disappeared before 1835, but was rediscovered by Kosegarten in 1836 in the archives of Putbus. In 1897, a largely unchanged transcription of the Putbus manuscript was printed by Georg Gaebel in Des Thomas Kantzow Chronik von Pommern in hochdeutscher Mundart (English translation: "Thomas Kantzow's chronicle of Pomerania in Standard German tongue"), vol. I.

=== Vom alten Pomerland ===
The book Vom alten Pomerland (English translation: "Of the old Pomerania") was an incomplete work written in Wittenberg, with seven writings constituting preparatory works for the eighth one, of which a ninth one is largely a copy written by someone else but corrected by Kantzow. The manuscripts were part of Kantzows handwritings discovered in the abovementioned von Löper's library, and published by Böhmer together with the abovementioned Low German chronicle.

=== Pomerania, Ursprunck, Aldtheitt vnd Geschicht der Volcker und Lande Pommern, Cassuben, Wenden, Stettin vnd Rugenn ===
After Kantzow's death, Nicolaus von Klempzen compiled this chronicle from Kantzow's legacy, and published it in four books known either as Kantzow's or Klempzen's Pomerania. A corresponding manuscript was discovered only in 1973 in the archives of Copenhagen ("Thott 644 Fol."), proving that Klempzen was merely publishing, not re-organizing Kantzow's chronicle, as was assumed before. A transcription of this chronicle was published as print edition in 1908, before the discovery of the Copenhagen manuscript, by Georg Gaebel, titled Pomerania. Eine pommersche Chronik aus dem sechzehnten Jahrhundert (English translation: "Pomerania. A Pomeranian chronicle from the 16th century").

== Sources ==
=== Bibliography ===
- Berger, Katarina (2001). Erzählungen und Erzählstoffe in Pommern 1840 bis 1938 (in German). Münster/New York/München/Berlin. 3893258698.
- Böhmer, Wilhelm, ed. (1835). Thomas Kantzows Chronik von Pommern in niederdeutscher Mundart sammt einer Auswahl aus den übrigen ungedruckten Schriften desselben (in German). Stettin.
- Bülow, von (1903). "Böhmer, Heinrich Wilhelm". Allgemeine Deutsche Biographie (in German). Vol. 47. pp. 79–81.
- Bülow, von (1882). "Kantzow, Thomas". Allgemeine Deutsche Biographie (in German). Vol. 15. pp. 97–98.
- Gaebel, Georg (1897). Des Thomas Kantzow Chronik von Pommern in hochdeutscher Mundart (in German). Vol. 1. Stettin.
- Kosegarten, Johann Gottfried Ludwig (1842). Nachricht von der Wiederauffindung der durch Thomas Kantzow eigenhändig geschriebenen zweyten hochdeutschen Abfassung seiner Pommerschen Chronik (in German). Greifswald.
- Petersohn, Jürgen (1973) (in German): Die dritte hochdeutsche Fassung von Kantzows pommerscher Chronik. Identifikation eines verkannten Geschichtswerks, in: Baltische Studien NF 59, pp. 27–41.
- Schmidt, Roderich (1977). "Kantzow, Thomas". Neue Deutsche Biographie (in German). Vol. 11. pp. 128f.
