= Anna Jagiellon (disambiguation) =

Anna Jagiellon (1523–1596) was Queen of Poland and Grand Duchess of Lithuania

Anna Jagiellon may also refer to:

- Anna Jagiellon, Duchess of Pomerania (1476–1503), daughter of Casimir IV Jagiellon of Poland, wife of Bogislaus X, Duke of Pomerania
- Anne of Bohemia and Hungary (1503–1547), only daughter of Vladislaus II of Bohemia and Hungary, Queen consort of Ferdinand I, Holy Roman Emperor
- Anna Jagiellon (1515–1520), elder daughter of Sigismund I the Old of Poland
