= Croÿ-Teppich =

German tapestry

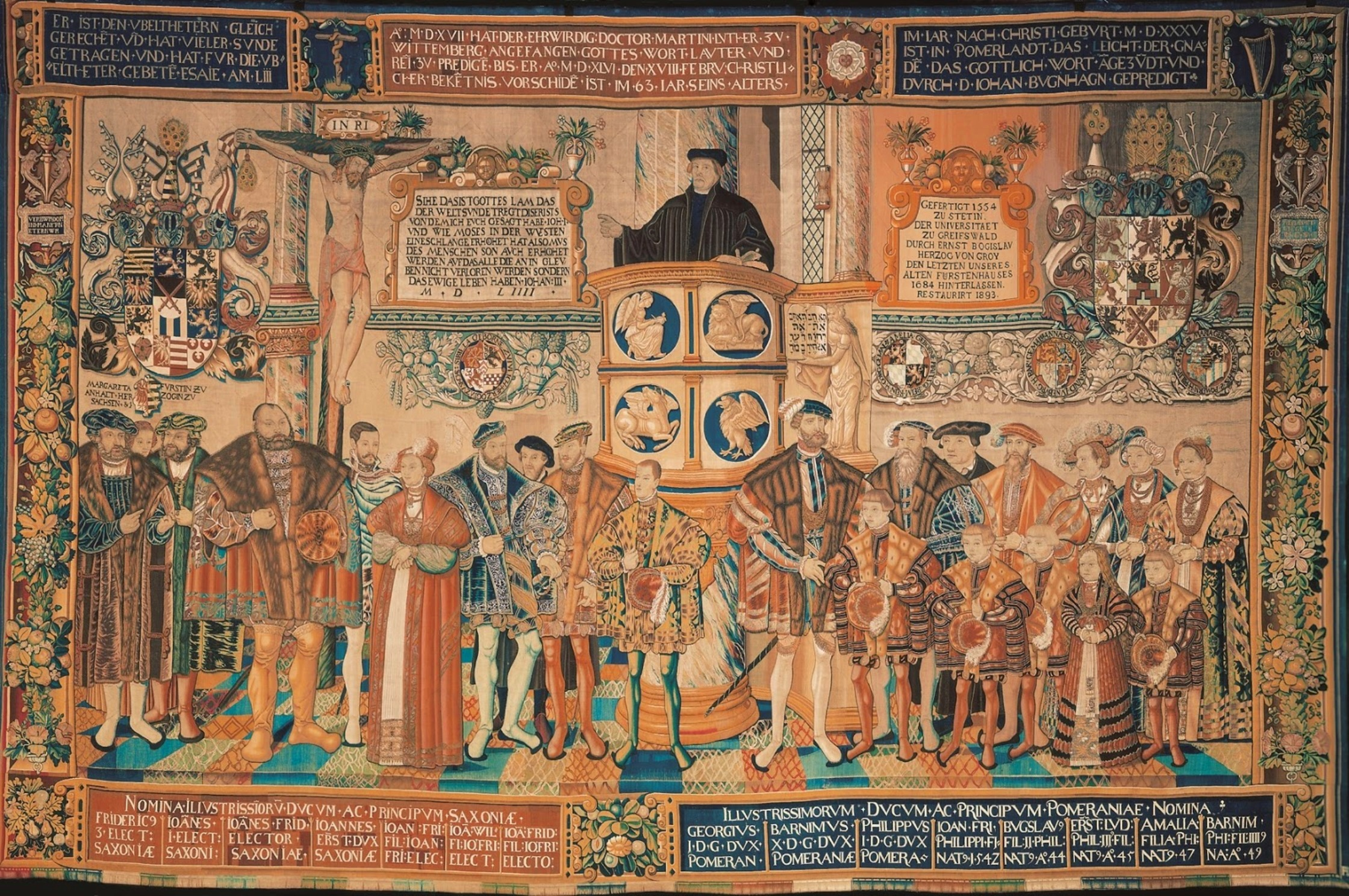
Croÿ-Teppich from 1554/1556

The Croÿ-Teppich (Tapetum Concordiae) is a 6.80 metre long and 4.32 metre tapestry, which is owned by the University of Greifswald. It is considered a unique cultural and historical testimony from the time of the Reformation due to its size, depiction and quality of execution.

The work was commissioned by Duke Philip I, Duke of Pomerania in 1554 and made by Peter Heymans, a Dutch image weaver, in Szczecin or Jasenitz. The basse-lisse technique was used. On the carpet is a depiction of the Pomeranian Duke Philip I with his family as well as the family of his wife Maria of Saxony, Duchess of Pomerania, of the Course of Saxony Princely House on the occasion of the wedding. The figures are arranged below the preaching Martin Luther. Also in the background are the Protestant reformers Philipp Melanchthon and Johannes Bugenhagen. But not only the wedding is to be depicted, but also the longed-for unity of faith within Lutheranism in view of the disputes after the Augsburg Interim of 1548 (thesis by Heimo Reinitzer).

Ernst Bogislaw von Croÿ, son of Duchess Anna von Pommern, donated the tapestry to the Greifswald University in 1681. The donation was accompanied by the condition that it be displayed in the university's large lecture hall every ten years, on the anniversary of Duchess Anna's death on 7 July.

During the Second World War, the work was initially removed to Lübeck, from where it was transferred to the Kunstgutlager Schloss Celle before being returned to the place of its testamentary destination on the occasion of the 500th anniversary of the university in 1956.

Since 2005, the Croÿ carpet has been on loan from the University of Greifswald to the Pommersches Landesmuseum in Greifswald. In 2014, it was entered in the Register of nationally valuable cultural assets.
