= Anna of Poland (disambiguation) =

Anna or Ann(e) of Poland may refer to:

- Anna of Poland, Countess of Celje (1366–1425)
- Anna Jagiellon, Duchess of Pomerania (1476–1503), duchess-consort of Pomerania-Wolgast & daughter of Casimir IV Jagiellon
- Anne of Bohemia and Hungary (1503–1547)
- Queen Anna of Poland (1523–1596), a.k.a. Anna Jagiellon
- Anne of Austria, Queen of Poland (1573–1598)
