= Amalie of the Palatinate =

Duchess of Pomerania-Wolgast (1490–1524)

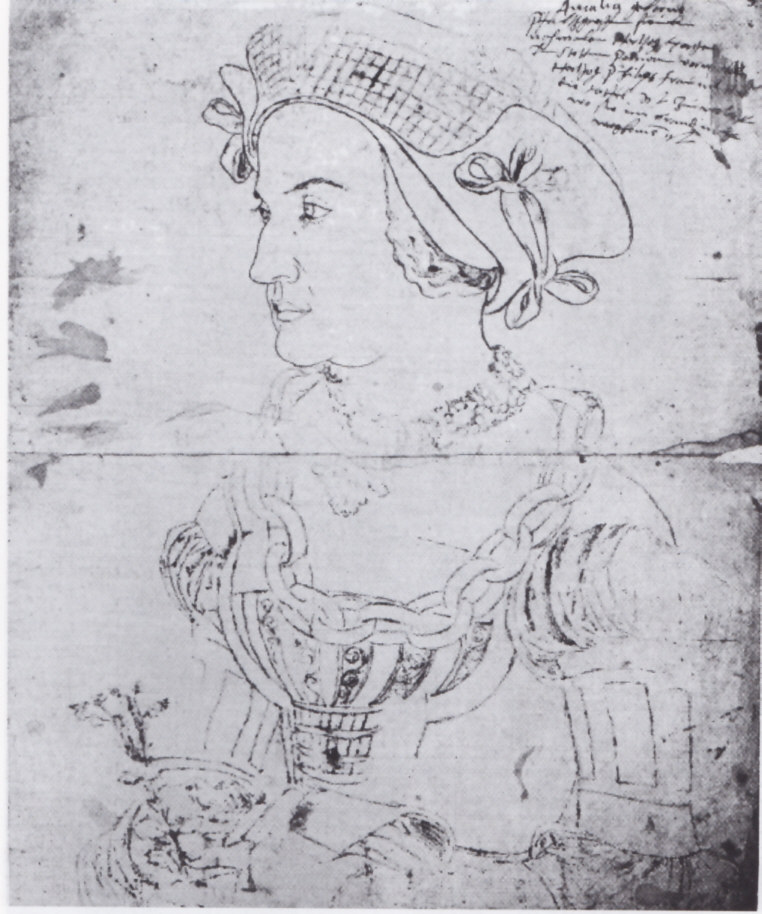
- Born: 25 July 1490; Heidelberg
- Died: 6 January 1524 (aged 33); Szczecin
- Noble family: Wittelsbach
- Spouse: George I, Duke of Pomerania
- Issue Detail: Philip I, Duke of Pomerania
- Father: Philip, Elector Palatine
- Mother: Margaret of Bavaria, Electress Palatine

Amalie of the Palatinate (also Amelia von der Pfalz.) (25 July 1490 in Heidelberg – 6 January 1524, Szczecin) was a member of the Wittelsbach family and a Countess Palatine of Simmern by birth and Duchess of Pomerania-Wolgast by marriage.

== Life ==
Amalie was a daughter of the Elector Philip of the Palatinate (1448–1508) from his marriage to Margaret (1456–1501), daughter of Duke Louis IX of Bavaria-Landshut.

She was married on 22 May 1513 in Stettin to Duke George I of Pomerania-Wolgast (1493–1531). The marriage was arranged by Bogislaw X, Duke of Pomerania, in an attempt to obtain the support of the Palatinate in his dispute over the Electorate of Brandenburg. At the same time, George's cousin, Henry V, Duke of Mecklenburg, married Amelie's sister, Helen of the Palatinate. Amalie's marriage was celebrated with much pomp and circumstance, in the presence of many princes. It is said that during the wedding ceremony, a dispute arose between the envoys of the kings of Denmark and Poland about their ceremonial ranking.

The Duchess was described as "modest"; she knew how to use her state as reigning princess. Amalie's son, Philip I, Duke of Pomerania. was brought up after 1526 in Heidelberg at the court of her brother, Louis V, Elector Palatine.

Amelia, who had been sickly during her whole life, died in 1524, at the age of 33 and was buried in Szczecin.

== Family ==
Amalie had the following children:

- Bogislaw XI (1514–1514)
- Philip I (1515–1560), Duke of Pomerania-Wolgast, who married princess Maria of Saxony, Duchess of Pomerania, (1515–1583) in 1536
- Margaret (1518–1569), who married Ernest III, Duke of Brunswick-Grubenhagen (1518–1567) in 1547

== References and sources ==
- Friedrich Wilhelm Barthold: Geschichte von Rügen und Pommern, Perthes, 1845, pp. 83 ff and 178
