= John Frederick, Duke of Pomerania =

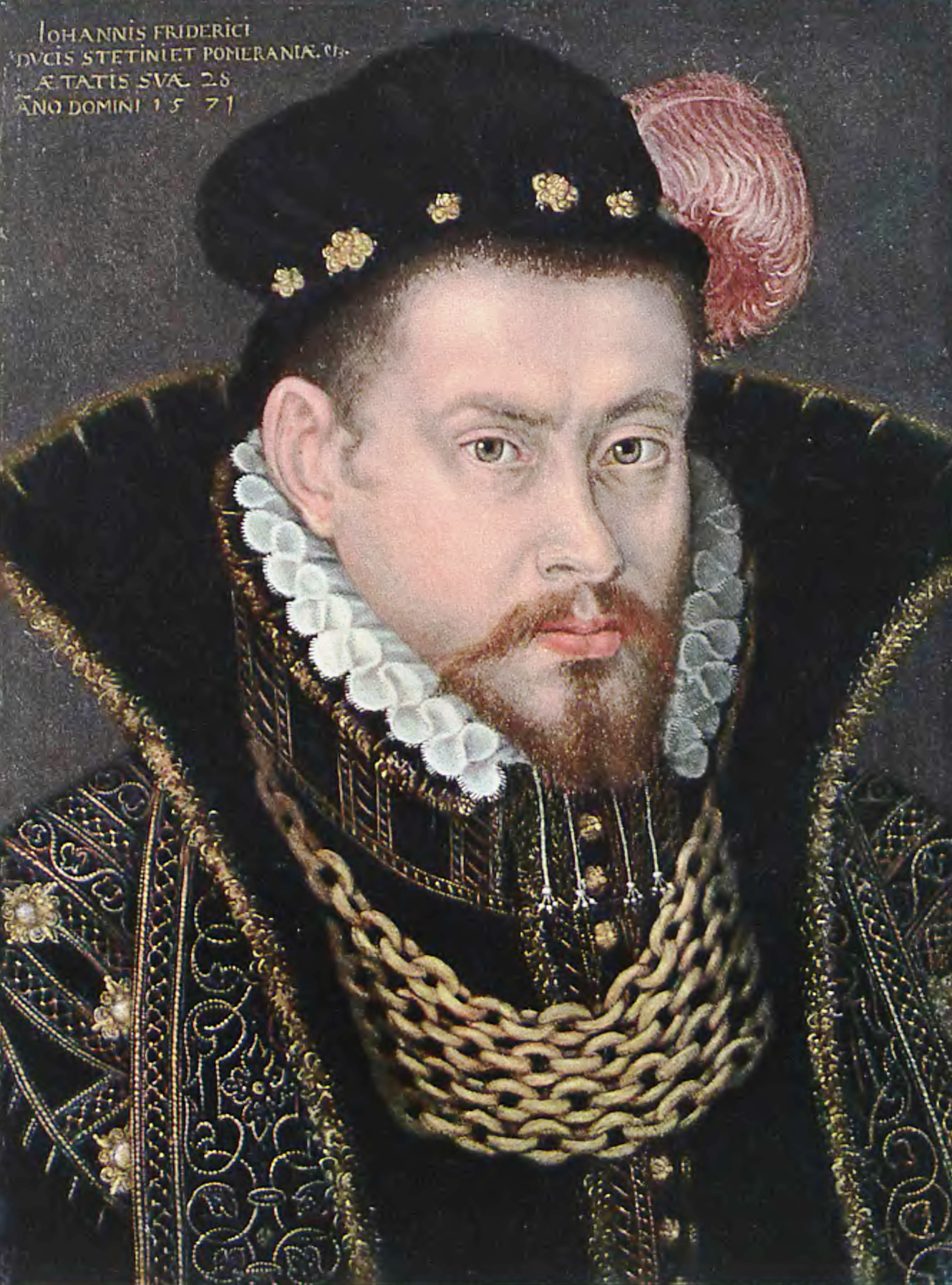
- Portrait from 1571, by Giovanni Battista Perini
- Born: 27 August 1542; Wolgast
- Died: 9 February 1600 (aged 57); Wolgast
- Burial: Castle Church in Szczecin
- Spouse: Erdmuthe of Brandenburg
- House: House of Griffin
- Father: Philip I, Duke of Pomerania
- Mother: Maria of Saxony

John Frederick (German: Johann Friedrich; 27 August 1542 – 9 February 1600) was Duke of Pomerania from 1560 to 1600, and Bishop of Cammin (Kamień) from 1556 to 1574. Elected bishop in 1556 and heir of the duchy in 1560, he remained under the tutelage of his great-uncle Barnim XI until he took on his offices in 1567.

== Biography ==
Johann Friedrich was the oldest of ten siblings, born to Philipp I of Pomerania-Wolgast and Maria of Saxony. At the age of 14, he was elected bishop of Cammin on 29 August 1556, after his predecessor Martin von Weiher had died on 8 June. Starting with John Frederick, the House of Griffin held this title until the last duke died in 1637, thus ending the considerable independence of the bishopric's territory from the rest of the Duchy of Pomerania. In 1560, the bishopric's administration was reformed accordingly.

When his father died on 14 February 1560, John Frederick nominally became duke of Pomerania but was still under the tutelage of his great-uncle, Barnim XI. While his mother appointed High Steward Ulrich von Schwerin as administrator of the duchy, he went to the court of Emperor Maximilian II at Vienna and participated in the war against the Ottoman Empire.

After his return from the war in 1567, John Frederick took on his position as the bishop of Cammin and also his position as the duke of Pomerania, which he provisionally shared with his brother, Bogislaw XIII.

Then 68-year-old Barnim XI decided in 1569 to withdraw from his position as a duke, and the duchy was internally partitioned among the male members of the House of Pomerania on 23 May 1569 in Jasenitz (now part of Police), which was approved by the Landtag in Wollin (now Wolin). Johann Friedrich, together with his brother, Barnim XII, received the Teilherzogtum Pomerania-Stettin, while his other brothers, Ernest Louis and Bogislaw XIII, received Pomerania-Wolgast and Casimir VI received the bishopric of Cammin, which he took over from John Frederick in 1574. Because Bogislaw and Barnim immediately renounced their positions and were compensated with the domains of Barth and Neuenkamp and the domain of Rügenwalde, respectively, John Frederick got to rule his share alone.

John Frederick succeeded in elevating Stettin (now Szczecin) to one of only three places allowed to coin money in the Upper Saxon Circle, the other two places were Leipzig and Berlin. He also advocated against the imperial prohibition of using coins from outside the Holy Roman Empire, arguing that this undermined his duchy's position as a frontier trade center.

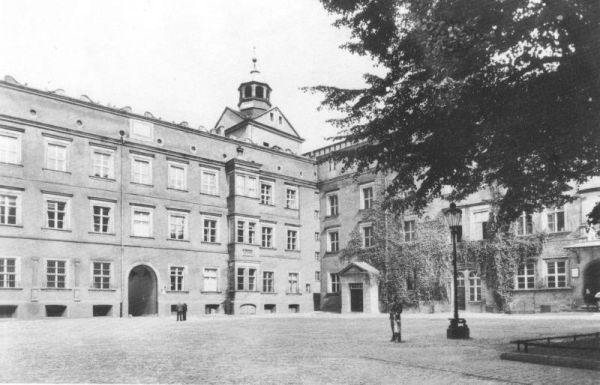
Residence in Stettin (1939), rebuilt by John Frederick in 1577

In 1570, John Frederick, on behalf of Emperor Maximilian II, hosted the peace conference ending the Northern Seven Years' War between the Swedish Empire and Denmark–Norway. He was the head of the mediators appointed by the emperor. The conference resulted in the Treaty of Stettin.

In 1568, he began with the erection of a residence in Köslin (now Koszalin). In 1577, he rebuilt the residence in Stettin in the Italian Renaissance style, thereby razing and replacing parts of the previous palace and the St. Otto's church.

John Frederick also tried to elevate Pomerania's military status in the Upper Saxon Circle to match the position of Saxony and Brandenburg, yet unsuccessfully. He failed to gain the status of a higher rank for himself and remained on the third rank, Zugeordneter, after the Kreisoberst of Saxony and the Nachgeordneter of Brandenburg. He also failed to get the circle assembly (Kreistag) to approve of granting the Pomeranian duchy an additional Zugeordneter post instead. As a consequence, John Frederick refused to pay his obligate financial share to the circle's treasury, the Kreiskasten.

John Frederick improved the relations with Brandenburg by marrying Erdmut (also Erdmuthe; 26 June 1561 – 13 November 1623), oldest daughter of John George, Elector of Brandenburg. He had no children with her.

John Frederick died on 9 February 1600. His sudden death during a party at Wolgast contributed to apocalyptic fears, which were especially widespread in 1600. He was succeeded by Barnim XII; who, however, outlived his brother by only three years.

== Bibliography ==
- Grewolls, Grete (1995). Wer war wer in Mecklenburg-Vorpommern? Ein Personenlexikon. Edition Temmen. ISBN 3-86108-282-9.
- Hildisch, Johannes (1980). Die Münzen der pommerschen Herzöge von 1569 bis zum Erlöschen des Greifengeschlechtes. Böhlau. ISBN 3-412-04679-5.
- Inachim, Kyra (2008). Die Geschichte Pommerns. Hinstorff Rostock. ISBN 978-3-356-01044-2.
- Kaufmann, Thomas (2006). Konfession und Kultur: lutherischer Protestantismus in der zweiten Hälfte des Reformationsjahrhunderts. Mohr Siebeck. ISBN 3161490177.
- Krüger, Joachim (2006). Zwischen dem Reich und Schweden: die landesherrliche Münzprägung im Herzogtum Pommern und in Schwedisch-Pommern in der frühen Neuzeit (ca. 1580 bis 1715). LIT Verlag Berlin-Hamburg-Münster. ISBN 3-8258-9768-0.
- Lanzinner, Maximilian (1993). Friedenssicherung und politische Einheit des Reiches unter Kaiser Maximilian II. (1564–1576). Vandenhoeck & Ruprecht. ISBN 3-525-35947-0.
- Lavery, Jason Edward (2002). Germany's northern challenge: the Holy Roman Empire and the Scandinavian struggle for the Baltic, 1563–1576. Brill Academic. ISBN 0-391-04156-8.
- Nicklas, Thomas (2002). Macht oder Recht: frühneuzeitliche Politik im Obersächsischen Reichskreis. Franz Steiner Verlag. ISBN 3-515-07939-4.

John Frederick of Pomerania House of Pomerania Born: 27 August 1542 Died: 9 February 1600
Regnal titles
| Preceded by Martin Weiher | Administrator of Cammin; 1557–1574 | Succeeded by Casimir VI |
| Preceded by Philip I | Duke of Pomerania-Wolgast; 1560–1569 with Barnim X (1560–1569); Bogislaw XIII (1560–1569); Ernest Louis (1560–1592) | Succeeded by Ernest Louis as sole ruler |
| Preceded by Barnim XI | Duke of Pomerania-Stettin; 1569–1600 | Succeeded by Barnim XII |
