= Maria of Saxony, Duchess of Pomerania =

Duchess of Pomerania-Wolgast (1515–1583)

Maria of Saxony
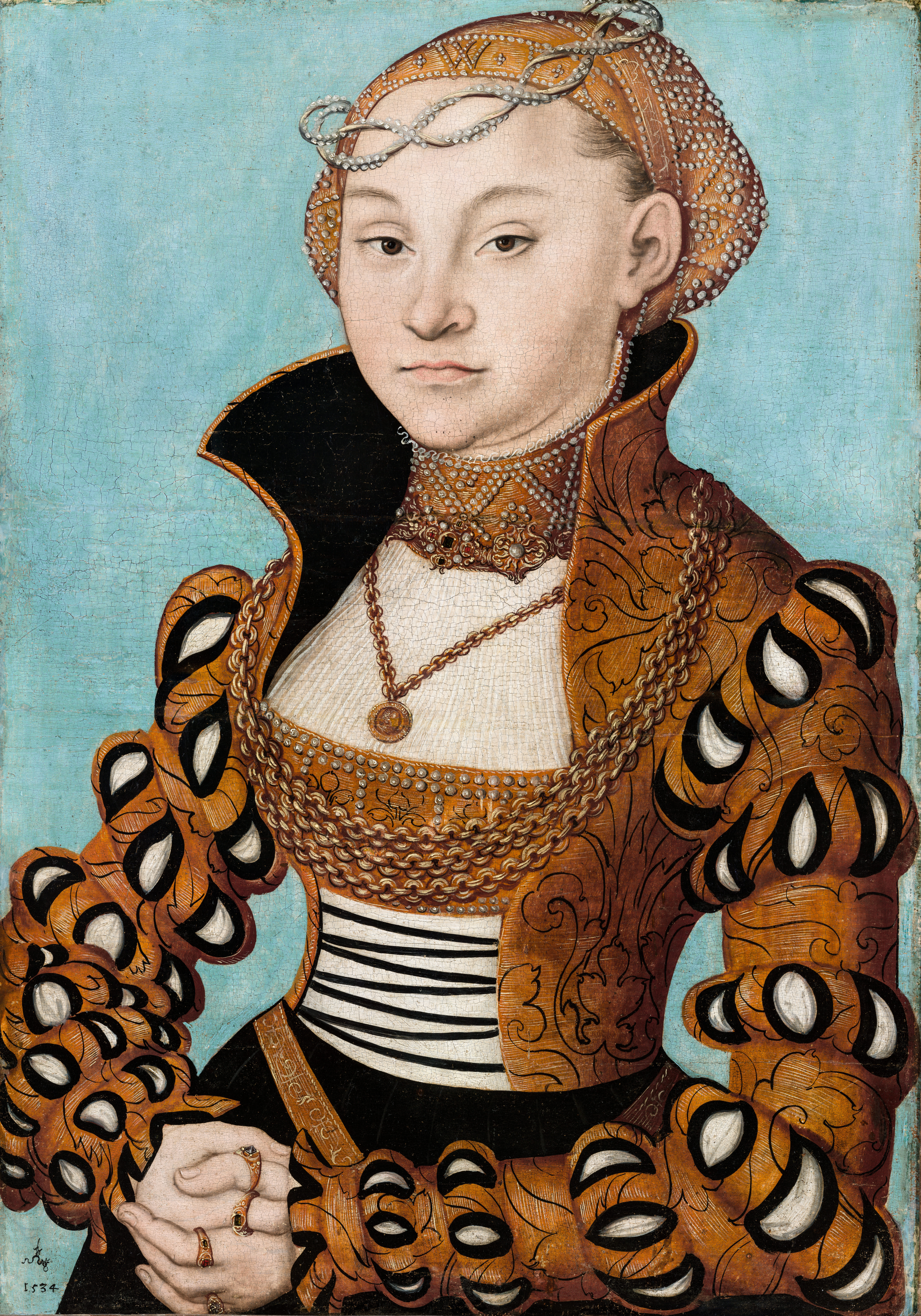
- Portrait by Lucas Cranach the Elder

Duchess consort of Pomerania-Wolgast
- Tenure: 27 February 1536 – 14 February 1560
- Born: 15 December 1515; Weimar
- Died: 7 January 1583 (aged 67); Wolgast
- Spouse: Philip I, Duke of Pomerania
- Issue among others...: John Frederick, Duke of Pomerania; Bogislaw XIII, Duke of Pomerania; Ernst Ludwig, Duke of Pomerania; Barnim X, Duke of Pomerania; Margaret, Duchess of Saxe-Lauenburg; Anna, Duchess of Mecklenburg-Güstrow; Casimir VI, Duke of Pomerania
- House: House of Wettin
- Father: John, Elector of Saxony
- Mother: Margaret of Anhalt-Köthen
- Religion: Lutheranism

Maria of Saxony (German: Maria von Sachsen; 15 December 1515 in Weimar – 7 January 1583 in Wolgast) was a member of the Ernestine line of the house Wettin and a Princess of Saxony by birth and by marriage a Duchess of Pomerania.

== Life ==
Mary was the eldest daughter of the Elector John "the Steadfast" of Saxony (1468–1532) from his second marriage to Margaret of Anhalt-Köthen (1494–1521), daughter Prince of Waldemar VI of Anhalt-Zerbst.

She married on 27 February 1536 in Torgau Duke Philip I of Pomerania (1515–1560). The marriage of the couple is depicted on the so-called Croÿ Tapestry, which shows, in addition to the bridal couple and their families, the Reformers Johannes Bugenhagen, Martin Luther, and Philipp Melanchthon. The tapestry comes from Cranach's workshop and is now in the Pomerania State Museum in Greifswald. During the ceremony, Martin Luther is reported to have dropped one of the rings, whereupon he exclaimed, "Hey, devils, this is none of your business!"

The marriage of Philip with Maria was meant to ally Pomerania with Saxony, which was leading the evangelical faction in the Diet. The marriage had been mediated by the Reformer Johannes Bugenhagen. Later that year, Pomerania joined the Schmalkaldic League.

After her husband's death Mary, who had been promised the district of the Pudagla as her Wittum, initially continued living at Wolgast Castle. In 1569, her son Ernest Louis, took over the business of government in the Duchy and granted her the income from the land of the former monastery Pudagla as jointure and in 1574, he built her Pudagla Castle using materials from the demolished monastery buildings.

== Issue ==
From her marriage with Philip, Maria had the following children:

1. George (1540–1544)
2. John Frederick I (1542–1600), Duke of Pomerania-Wolgast, married in 1577 Princess Erdmuthe of Brandenburg (1561–1623)
3. Bogislaw XIII (1544–1606), Duke of Pomerania-Barth, married firstly, in 1572 Princess Claire of Brunswick-Lüneburg (1550–1598), married secondly, in 1601 Princess Anne of Schleswig-Holstein-Sonderburg (1577–1616)
4. Ernest Louis (1545–1592), married in 1577 Princess Sophia Hedwig of Brunswick-Wolfenbüttel (1561–1631)
5. Amalie (1547–1580)
6. Barnim X (1549–1603), Duke of Pomerania-Rügenwalde married Anna Maria of Brandenburg (1567–1618)
7. Eric (1551–1551)
8. Margaret (1553–1581), married in 1574 Duke Francis II of Saxe-Lauenburg (1547–1619)
9. Anna (1554–1626), married in 1588 Duke Ulrich III of Mecklenburg-Güstrow (1528–1603)
10. Casimir VI (1557–1605), bishop of Cammin

== Bibliography ==
- Horst Robert Balz, Gerhard Krause, Gerhard Müller: Theologische Realenzyklopädie, vol. 27, De Gruyter, Berlin, 1997, p. 44 (Digitized)
- Carola Jäggi, Jörn Staecker: Archäologie der Reformation, de Gruyter, Berlin, 2007, p. 355 ff (Digitized)
- Heinrich Karl Wilhelm Berghaus: Landbuch des Herzogthums Pommern und des Fürstenthums Rügen, vol. 1, Anklam, 1865, p. 544 (Digitized)
