= Casimir VI of Pomerania =

Casimir VI
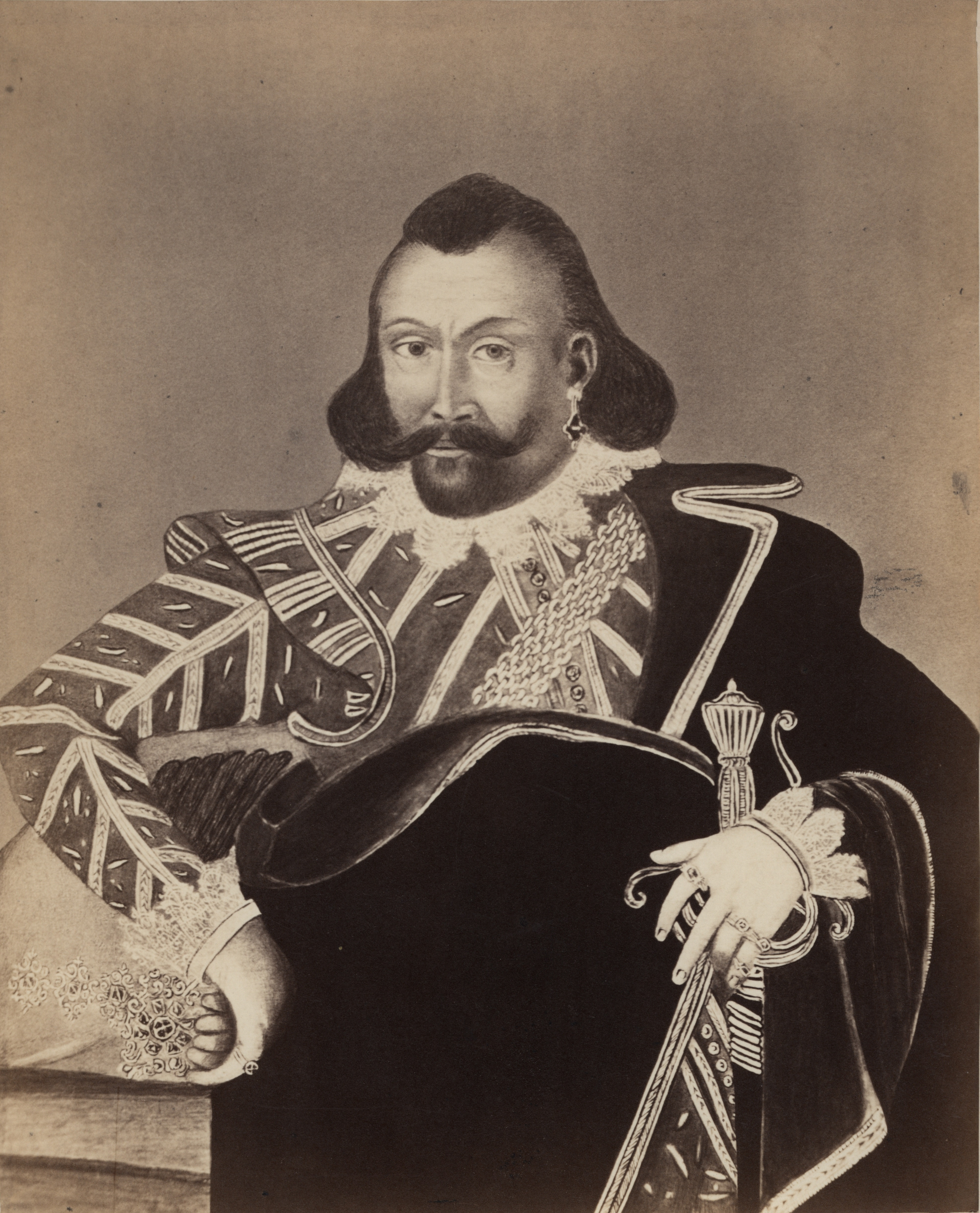

Administrator of Cammin prince-bishopric
- Administration: 1574–1602
- Predecessor: John Frederick
- Successor: Francis
- Born: 22 March 1557; Wolgast
- Died: 10 May 1605 (aged 48); Neuhausen Palace, near Rügenwalde
- Burial: 20 June 1605; Szczecin
- House: House of Griffin
- Father: Philip I
- Mother: Mary of Saxony
- Religion: Lutheran

Casimir VI (also known as Casimir IX; 22 March 1557 – 10 May 1605) was a member of the House of Griffin who ruled as Lutheran Administrator of the Prince-Bishopric of Cammin.

== Life ==
Casimir was born in Wolgast. He was the tenth child of Duke Philip I of Pomerania-Wolgast and his wife Maria of Saxony. Philip I died in 1560; he was survived by five of his sons. Apart from Casimir VI, they were John Frederick (born: 1542), Bogislaw XIII (born: 1544), Ernest Louis (born: 1545), Barnim X (born: 1549). Initially, the Lord High Stewart Ulrich von Schwerin, acted as regent. He was supported by an eleven-member regency council.

On 25 July 1569, the elder brothers wrote the Treaty of Jasenitz, dividing Pomerania among themselves. For Casimir, it was planned that he would later become the Lutheran administrator of the Prince-Bishopric of Cammin. In 1574, John Frederick renounced that position, and Casimir took over the diocese, aged just 17 years. In 1578, he undertook a Grand Tour to Italy and the Netherlands.

As Bishop of Cammin Casimir had many disputes with the city of Kolberg, the capital of the prince-bishopric. He left the business of government mostly to his advisers, including Joachim Damnitz. His areas of interest were fishing, banquet and tours.

In 1602, Casimir renounced the administration of Cammin Prince-Bishopric and took over the rule in the appanage duchy of Pomerania-Rügenwalde from his older brother Barnim X, who in turn took over the duchy of Pomerania-Stettin after John Frederick had died. Later, he added the district of Bütow. When Barnim X died in September 1603, it was Casimir's turn to rule Pomerania-Stettin, but he was seriously ill and did not take up government. In 1604, he renounced his ascension.

In May 1605, Casimir was suffering from smallpox and was bedridden for several days. He died on 10 May 1605, between 20:00 and 21:00 at his Neuhausen Palace near Rügenwalde. On 18 June 1605 his body was brought to Stettin and buried there on 20 June in the Ducal Castle Church.

He remained unmarried.

== Numeral ==
The counting of the rulers of the House of Griffins has always been complicated. From time immemorial there exists an imbalance, which causes some confusion. The modern numbering counts only the members of the House of Griffins who have reached adulthood and reigned. Under that system, the subject of this article is Casimir VI. If one also takes into account family members who never reigned, which was common in the older literature, he would be Casimir IX.

== References and sources ==
- Martin Wehrmann, Genealogie des pommerschen Herzogshauses, Stettin: Leon Sauniers Buchhandlung, 1937, p. 124.
- Martin Wehrmann, Geschichte von Pommern, second edition, Gotha: Friedrich Andreas Perthes, 1921, vol. 2, (reprint: Augsburg: 1992, ISBN 3-89350-112-6)

== Footnotes ==
Casimir VI of Pomerania House of Pomerania Born: 22 March 1557 Died: 10 May 1605
Regnal titles
Preceded by John Frederick	Administrator of Cammin; 1574–1602	Succeeded by Francis
