= Philip I of Pomerania =

Philip I
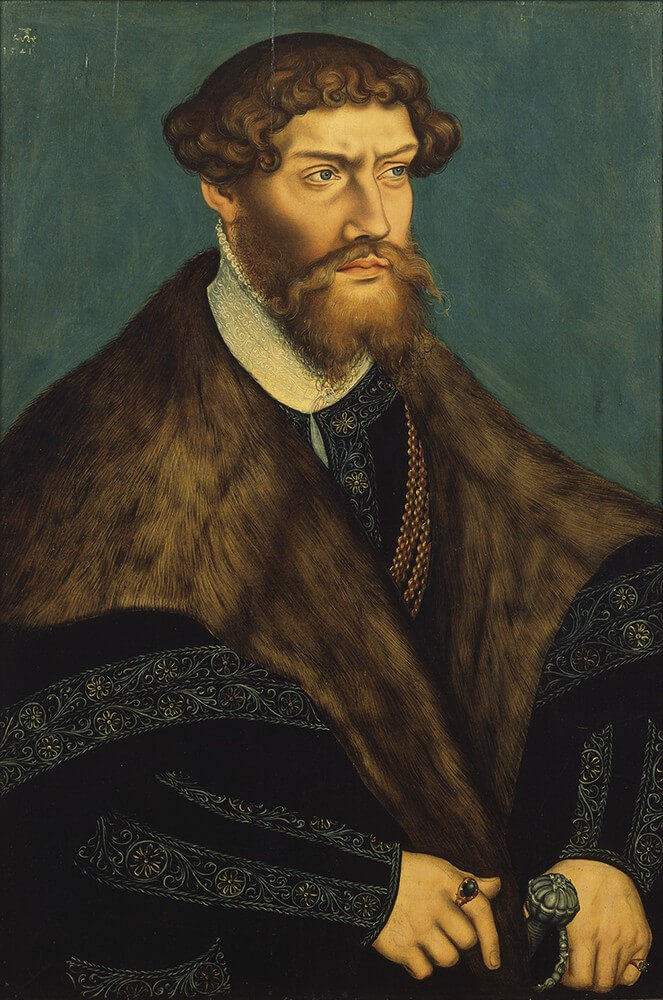
- Philip I of Pomerania-Wolgast, by Lucas Cranach the Younger

Duke of Pomerania-Wolgast
- Reign: 21 October 1532 – 14 February 1560
- Predecessor: George I
- Successor: Ernest Louis
- Born: 14 May 1515; Stettin
- Died: 14 February 1560 (aged 44); Wolgast
- Spouse: Maria of Saxony
- Issue among others...: John Frederick, Duke of Pomerania; Bogislaw XIII, Duke of Pomerania; Ernst Ludwig, Duke of Pomerania; Barnim X, Duke of Pomerania; Margaret, Duchess of Saxe-Lauenburg; Anna, Duchess of Mecklenburg-Güstrow; Casimir VI, Duke of Pomerania
- House: House of Griffin
- Father: George I, Duke of Pomerania
- Mother: Amalie of the Palatinate
- Religion: Lutheran

Philip I of Pomerania (14 May 1515, in Stettin – 14 February 1560, in Wolgast) was Duke of Pomerania-Wolgast.

== Life ==
Philip was the only surviving son of Duke George, from his first marriage to Amalie of the Palatinate. After his mother died, on 6 January 1525, he received his education at the court of his maternal grandfather in Heidelberg. He took office in Stettin at the age of 16, after the death of his father. On 21 October 1532, Philip and his uncle Barnim IX split Pomerania, with Philip taking Pomerania-Wolgast (Vorpommern). The division was initially limited to only nine years. It was, however, reconfirmed in 1541.

His main advisors were Jobst von Dewitz, Rüdiger von Massow and his Chancellor, Nikolaus Brun. His secretary was the chronicler Thomas Kantzow.

When he came to power, his first task was to sort out the relationship with his unloved step-mother, Margaret of Brandenburg. Under the marriage treaty of 1530, she was entitled to a specified part of his country as her Wittum. However, in the 1532 treaty with Barnim, part of her Wittum was awarded to his uncle, and was thus no longer his to give to his step-mother. In 1533, he gave her the districts of Barth, Tribsees, Grimmen and Breest. But a year later she married her second husband Prince John V of Anhalt.

When Philip took up government, he found his country in political and ecclesiastical turmoil. The Reformation had reached Pomerania and he could not ignore it, if he wanted to maintain his grip on the land. Consequently, the two Dukes decided to officially introduce Protestantism in their realm. They called a parliament in Treptow an der Rega in 1543 and invited Erasmus von Manteuffel-Arnhausen, the bishop of Cammin and representatives of the estates, the nobility and the cities. The Protestant cities were represented by Christian Ketelhut (representing Stralsund), Paul vom Rode (Stettin), Johannes Knipstro (Greifswald), Hermann Riecke (Stargard), Jakob Hogensee (Stolp). Also invited was Johannes Bugenhagen, a native of Pomerania and a supporter of Martin Luther. The parliament failed due to opposition by the nobility, but nevertheless, Bugenhagen was tasked with drafting a church order for the duchy. However, when this church order was ready, it was not officially entered into force. Bugenhagen continued to visit local churches, following the Saxon model. The Reformation gradually prevailed in Pomerania through the tireless activity of prominent evangelical leaders such as Paul Rode and John Knipstro. After the death of the bishop of Cammin, the road was completely open for the Reformation. The office of bishop of Cammin was offered to Bugenhagen, and when he turned down the offer, it was given to Bartholomaeus Suawe.

On 27 February 1536 Philip married Maria of Saxony, the half-sister of Elector John Frederick I of Saxony. In April 1536 in Frankfurt am Main, he and Barnim then joined the Schmalkaldic League. In 1547, after the Protestants had been defeated in the Schmalkaldic War, Philip feared persecution by the enraged Emperor Charles V. He managed to soothe Charles by paying a fine. The changing circumstances made work increasingly hard for bishop Suawe and in 1549, he resigned. He was succeeded by a Catholic bishop, who tried to restore the old situation and make the Church of Pomerania part of the Roman Catholic Church again. The attempt failed, and to ensure independence of his church, Philip appointed his eldest son John Frederick as bishop of Cammin. He also revived Bugenhagen's church order and mediated in the theological disputes that raged in his duchy.

Philip created his own High Court in Wolgast and tried his hand at delivering justice. He personally took part in court proceedings. He also promoted trade and transport in his country. In 1540, he managed to settle a dispute with the nobility that had festered since 1534, so he could finally receive general homage from the Estates. In his later years, his main advisors were Jacob von Zitzewitz, Valentin von Eickstedt and Ulrich von Schwerin; they kept advising Philip's sons after he died. His Councillor Michael Küssow enjoyed his special confidence, however Michael died in early 1558 and was succeeded by his brother Christian Küssow.

From 1540 to 1546 he expanded the ducal Castle Ueckermünde on the mouth of the river Uecker. He is depicted on a relief stone in the castle. The ducal residence Wolgast Castle, on an island in the river Peene, was rebuilt in several stages. On 11 December 1557 a large fire destroyed significant parts of the castle. Philip started the reconstruction, but did not live to see it completed.

== Marriage and issue ==
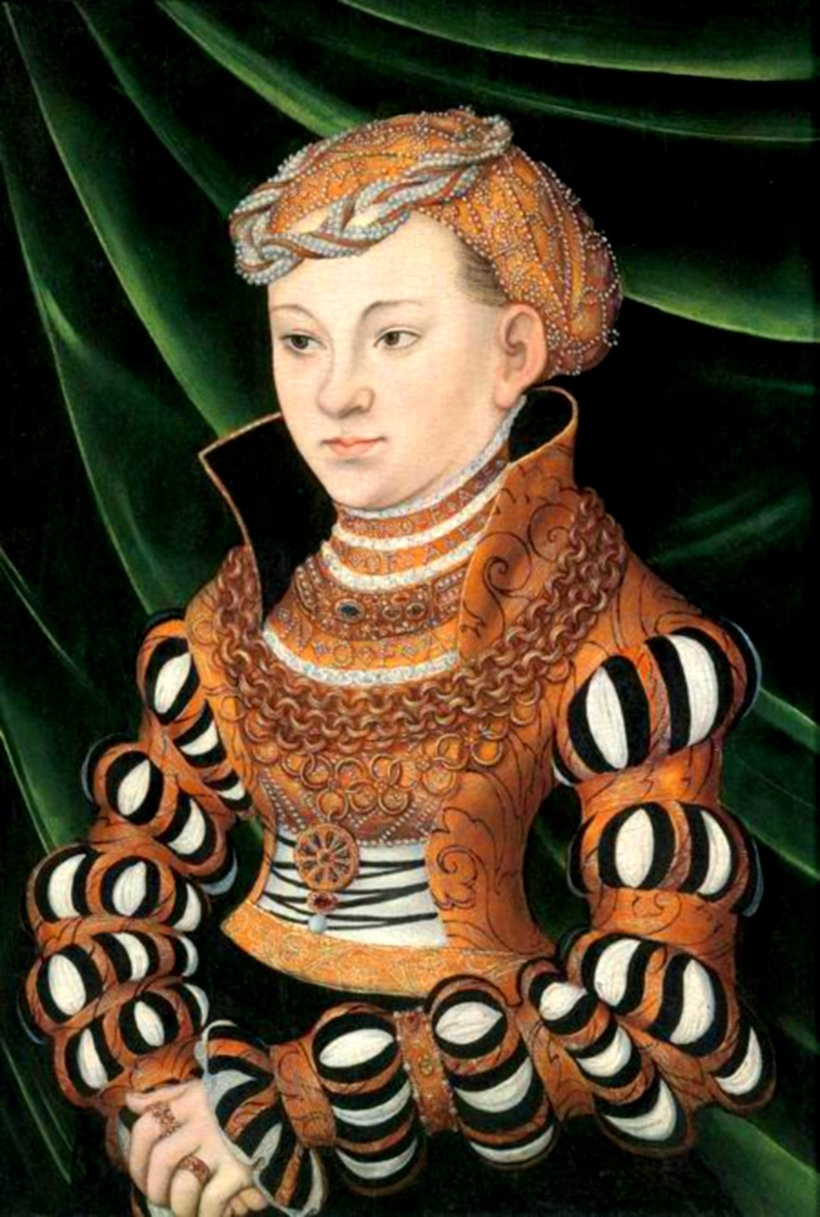
Maria of Saxony [1515-1589], by Lucas Cranach the Elder

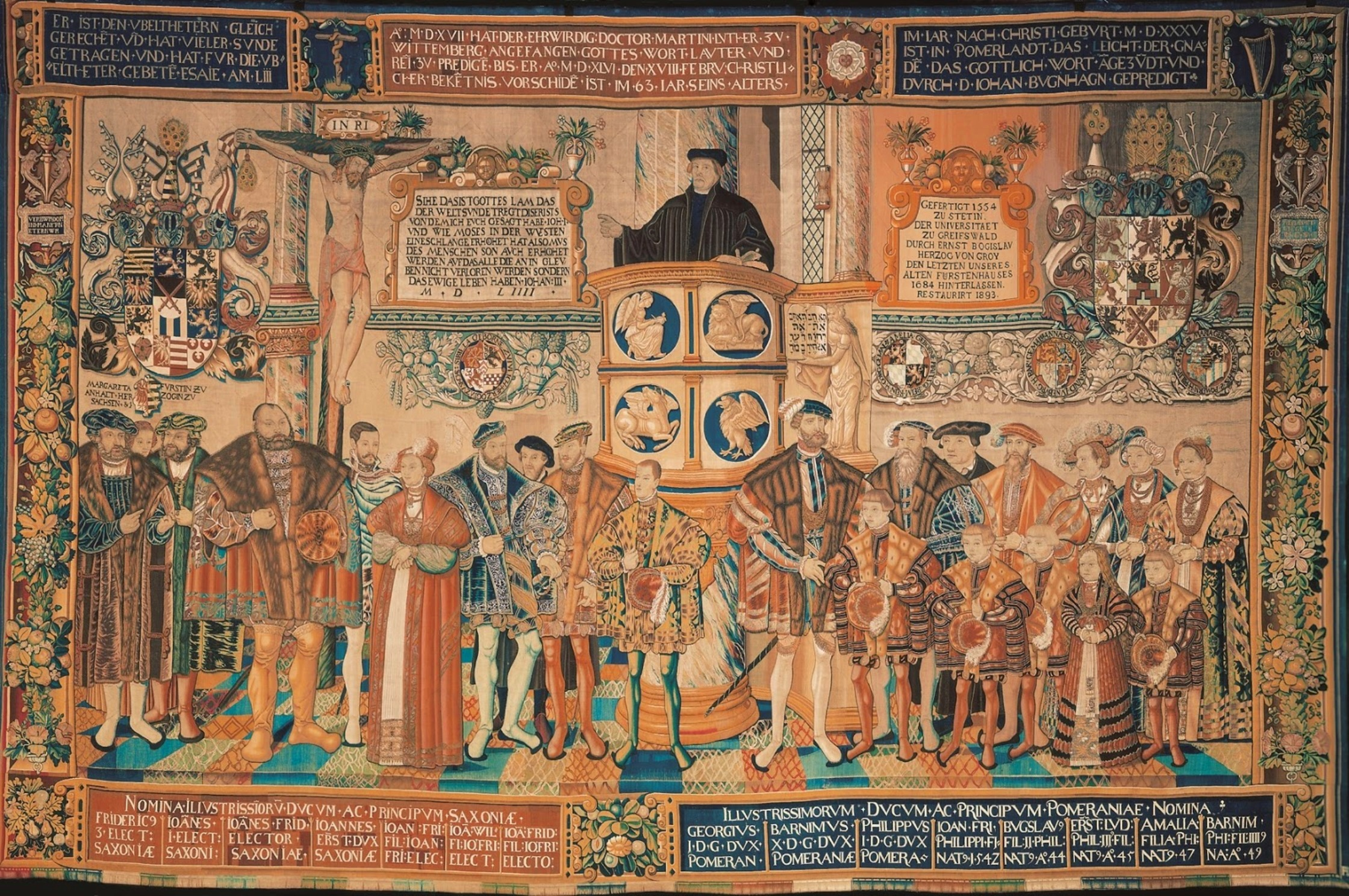
Croÿ-Teppich from 1554/1556 showing Philip and his family

On 27 February 1536, Philip married Maria of Saxony, the daughter of Elector John the Steadfast of Saxony. They had seven sons and three daughters:

- George (1540–1544)
- John Frederick (1542–1600); married Erdmuthe, daughter of John George, Elector of Brandenburg.
- Bogislaw XIII (1544–1606); married Clara, daughter of Francis, Duke of Brunswick-Lüneburg.
- Ernest Louis (1545–1592); married Sophia Hedwig (1561–1631), daughter of Julius, Duke of Brunswick-Wolfenbüttel.
- Amelia (1547–1580)
- Barnim X (1549–1603); married Anna Maria, daughter of John George, Elector of Brandenburg.
- Eric (1551–1551)
- Margaret (1553–1581); married Francis II, Duke of Saxe-Lauenburg.
- Anna (1554–1626); married Ulrich of Mecklenburg-Güstrow
- Casimir VI (1557–1605)
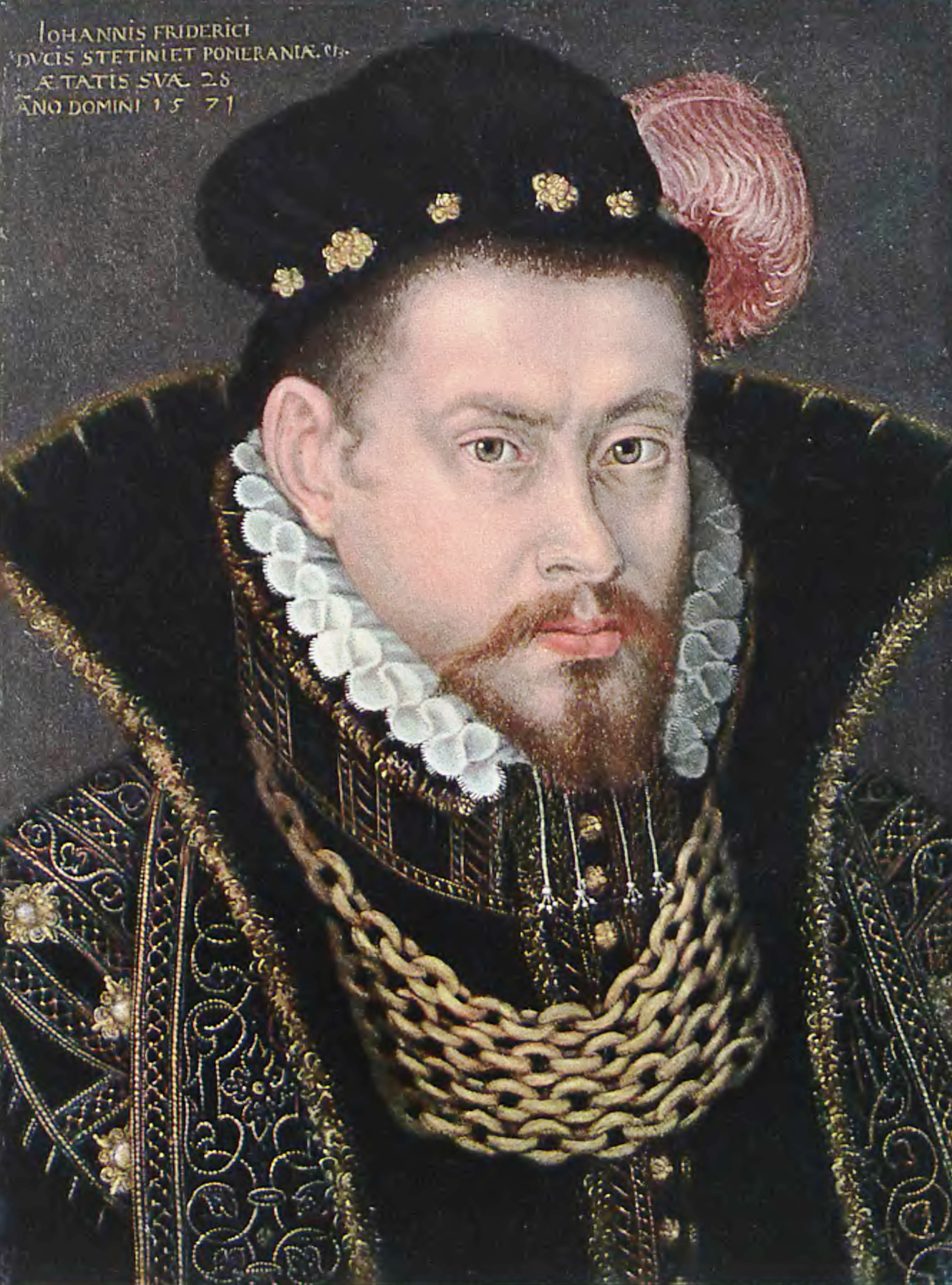
John Frederick, Duke of Pomerania [1571]

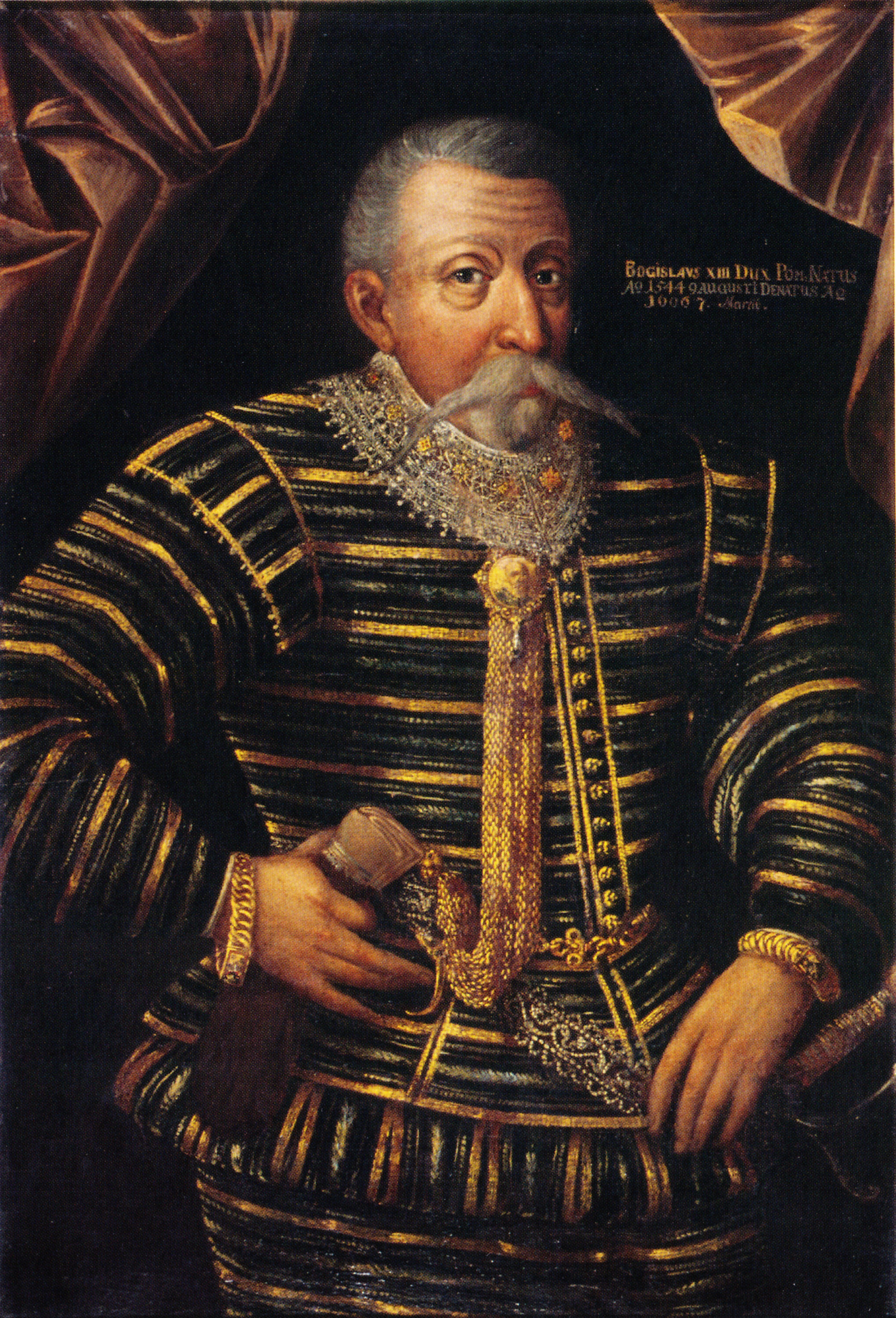
Bogislaw XIII

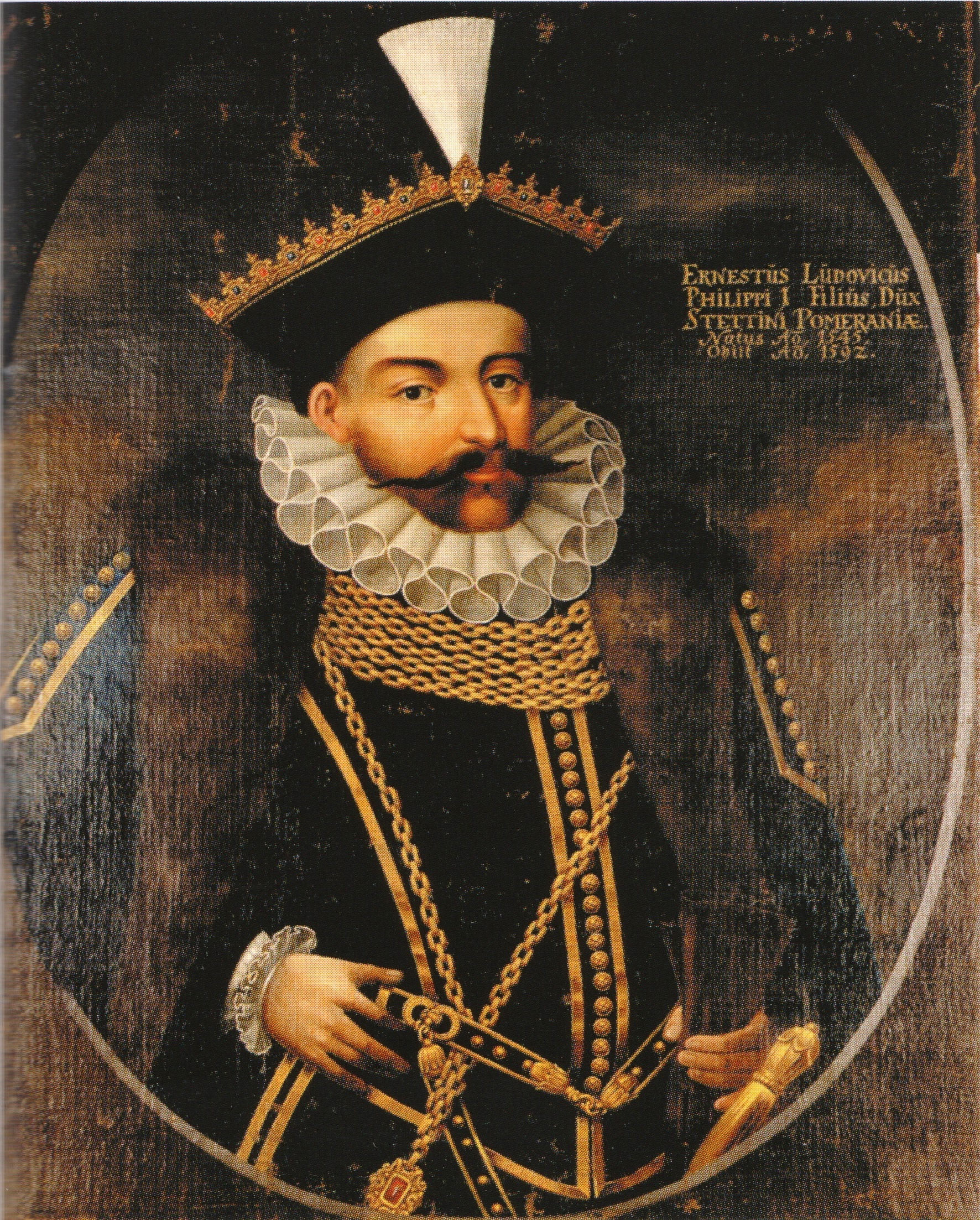
Ernest Louis, Duke of Pomerania

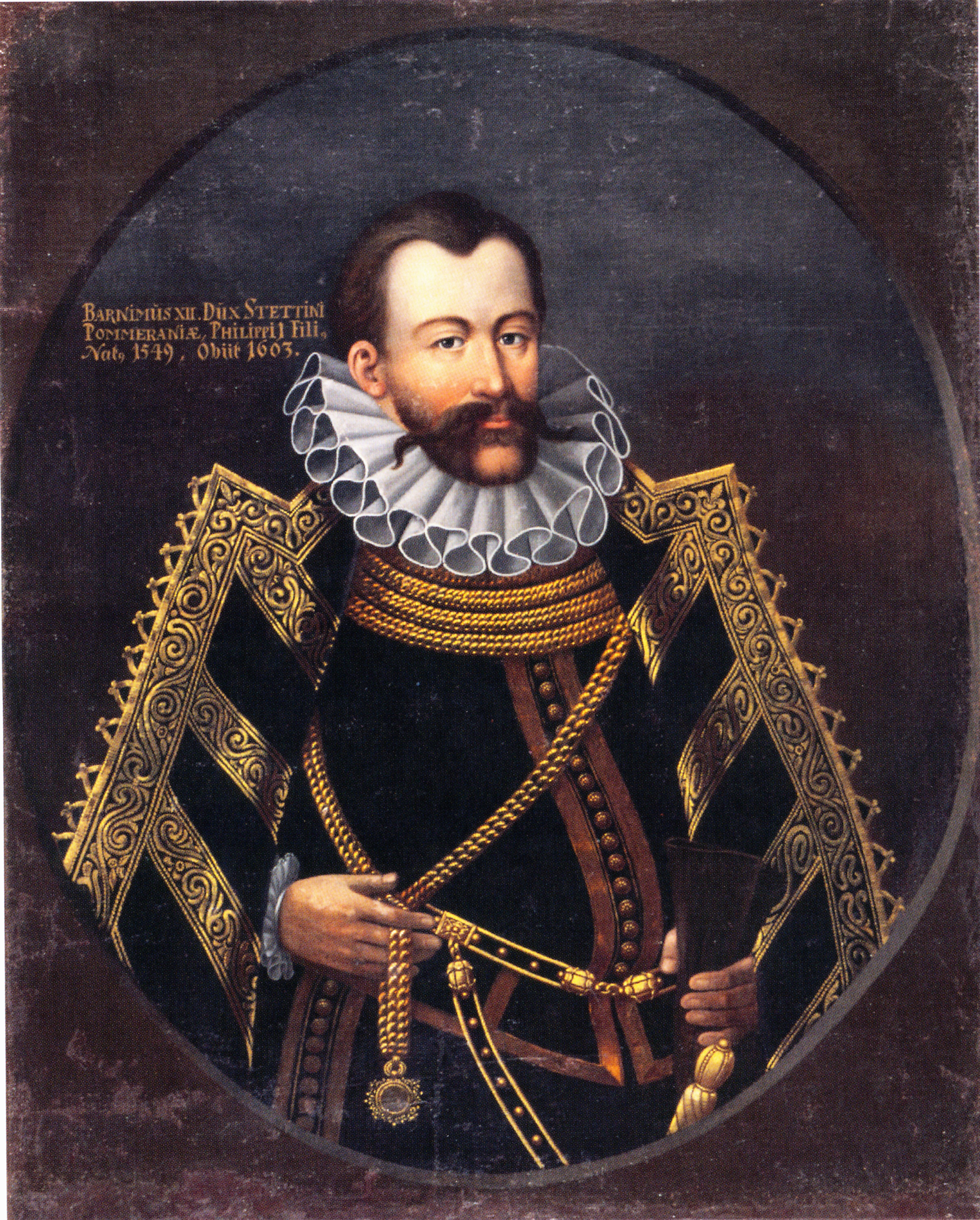
Barnim X, Duke of Pomerania

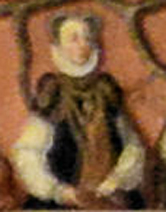
Margaret of Pomerania (1553-1581)

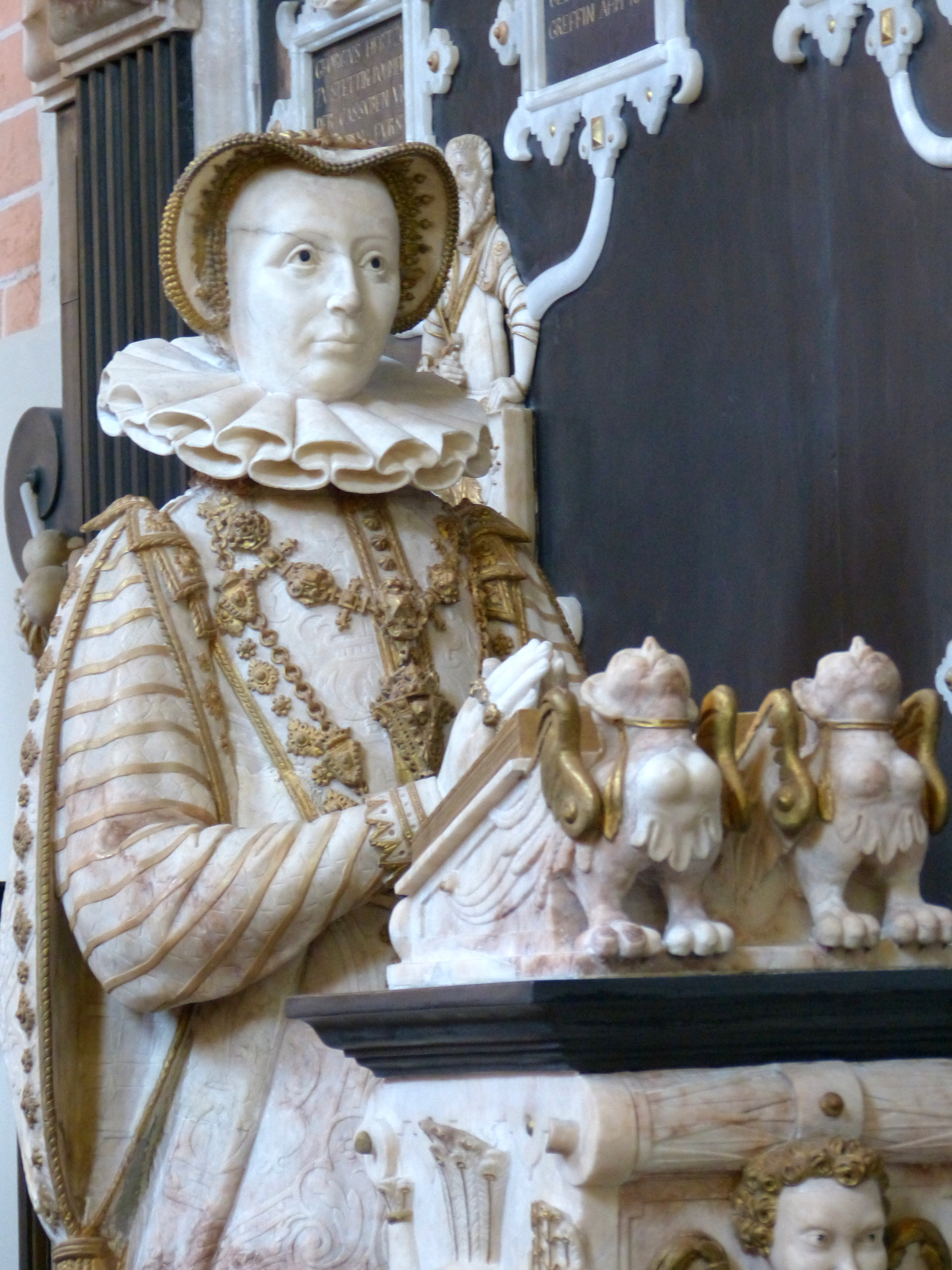
Anna [1554-1626]

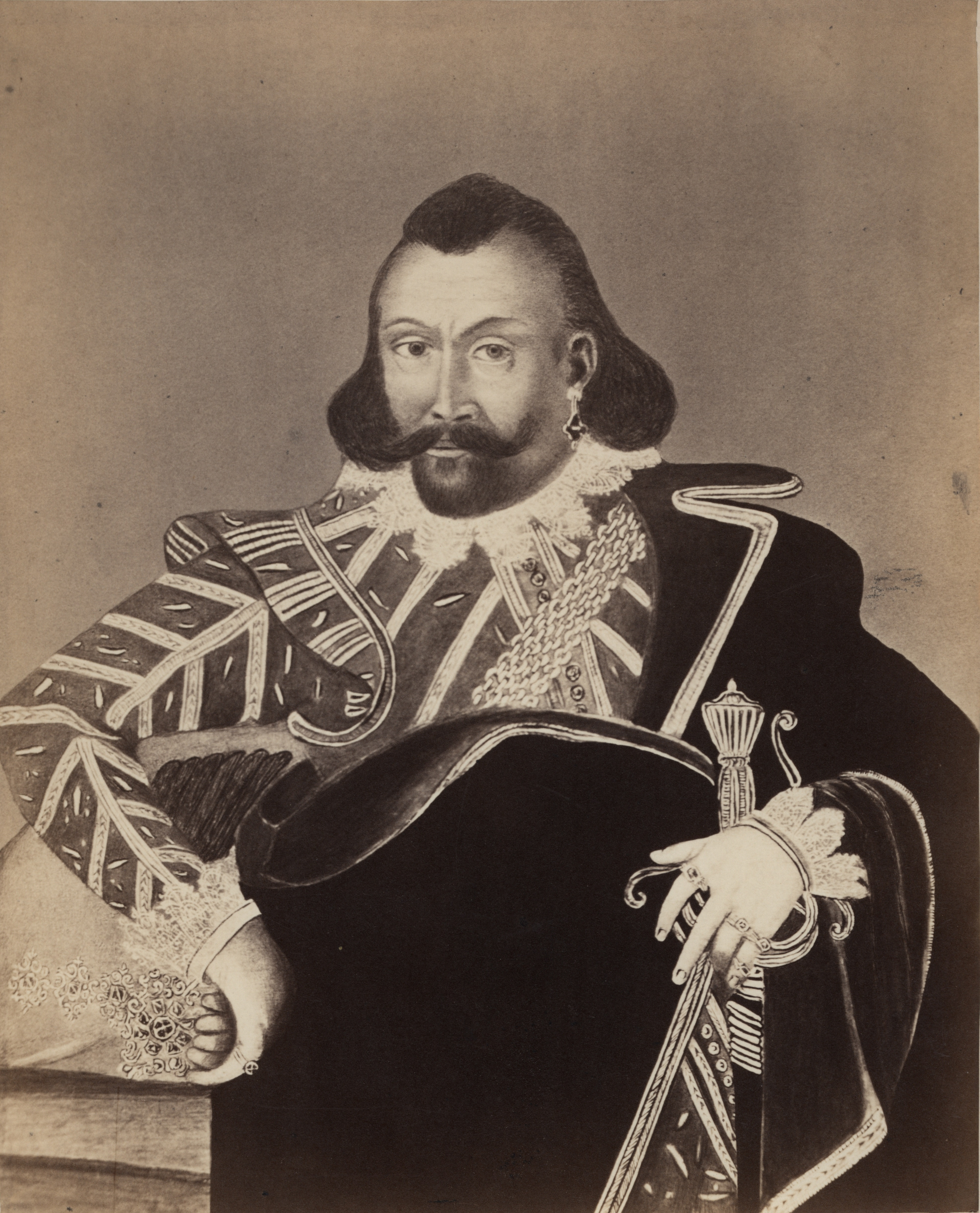
Casimir VI, Duke of Pomerania

Philip I of Pomerania House of Griffins Born: 14 May 1515 Died: 14 February 1560
Regnal titles
Preceded by George I and Barnim XI	Duke of Pomerania; 1531 – 1532 with Barnim XI (1523–1532)	Succeeded by Barnim XI as Duke of Pomerania-Stettin
Preceded by George I and Barnim XI	Duke of Pomerania; 1531 – 1532 with Barnim XI (1523–1532)	Retained Pomerania-Wolgast
Pomerania partitioned	Duke of Pomerania-Wolgast; 1532 – 1560	Succeeded by Barnim X Bogislaw XIII; Ernest Louis; John Frederick
