= Ulrich von Schwerin =

- Born: c. 1500
- Died: c. 1575
- Noble family: Schwerin
- Spouse: Anna von Arnim
- Father: Joachim von Schwerin
- Mother: Ottilie von Bredow

Ulrich von Schwerin, also spelled Huldrych von Schwerin or Huldricus Schwerinus (c. 1500 – c. 1575) was Hofmeister in the Duchy of Pomerania-Wolgast and one of the most influential men of his time. He was a member of the noble Schwerin family, who originally came from Mecklenburg.

== Life ==
He was the son of Joachim von Schwerin (died: before 1521) and his wife Ottilie von Bredow. Joachim and Ulrich were members of the line Putzar to Altwigshagen line of the Schwerin family and

Joachim was already in 1534 the Council of Duke Philip I of Pomerania-Wolgast. Later, Ulrich became Philip's Chamberlain. When in 1547, Pomerania was expecting Emperor Charles V to retaliate because of Pomerania's participation in the League of Schmalkalden, Ulrich was tasked with directing Pomerania's military affairs. Philip I died in 1560 and was succeeded by his five sons, who were all still a minors at the time. A regency council of eleven members was appointed by Barnim XI, the Duke of Pomerania-Stettin. Ulrich chaired this regency council. He was also a member of a committee to establish Church Order for Pomerania.

Even under Duke John Frederick, Ulrich as Lord High Steward remained concerned largely with the management of Pomerania's internal and external affairs. During the Northern Seven Years' War from 1563 to 1570, he sought to preserve Pomerania's neutrality and keep his country out of the military conflict.

After the end of the regency of Duke Barnim XI of Pomerania-Stettin in 1568, Ulrich coordinated the division of Pomerania-Wolgast among Philip I's five sons, as agreed on 3 February 1569 in Jasenitz (now part of Police, Poland).

Ulrich von Schwerin possessed extensive amounts of real estate and was so prosperous that he was able to grant loans not only to the dukes of Pomerania, but also to the dukes of Mecklenburg. In 1545 he built a castle in Putzar. Between 1558 and 1567, he built Spantekow Fortress. A high relief on the gatehouse of this fortress depicts Ulrich and his wife.

== Marriage and issue ==
With his wife Anna von Arnim (born: before 1530) he had seven sons. His son Ulrich built the Veste Landskron between 1576 and 1579.

== References and sources ==
- Gottfried von Bülow (1891). "Ulrich v. Schwerin". Allgemeine Deutsche Biographie (in German). Vol. 33. Leipzig: Duncker & Humblot. pp. 426–427.
- Hans Branig: Geschichte Pommerns I – Vom Werden des neuzeitlichen Staates bis zum Verlust der staatlichen Unabhängigkeit 1300–1648, Böhlau Verlag, Köln / Weimar / Berlin 1997, ISBN 3-412-07189-7
