= Anna Maria of Brandenburg =

Duchess of Pomerania (1567–1618)

- Duchess consort of Pomerania
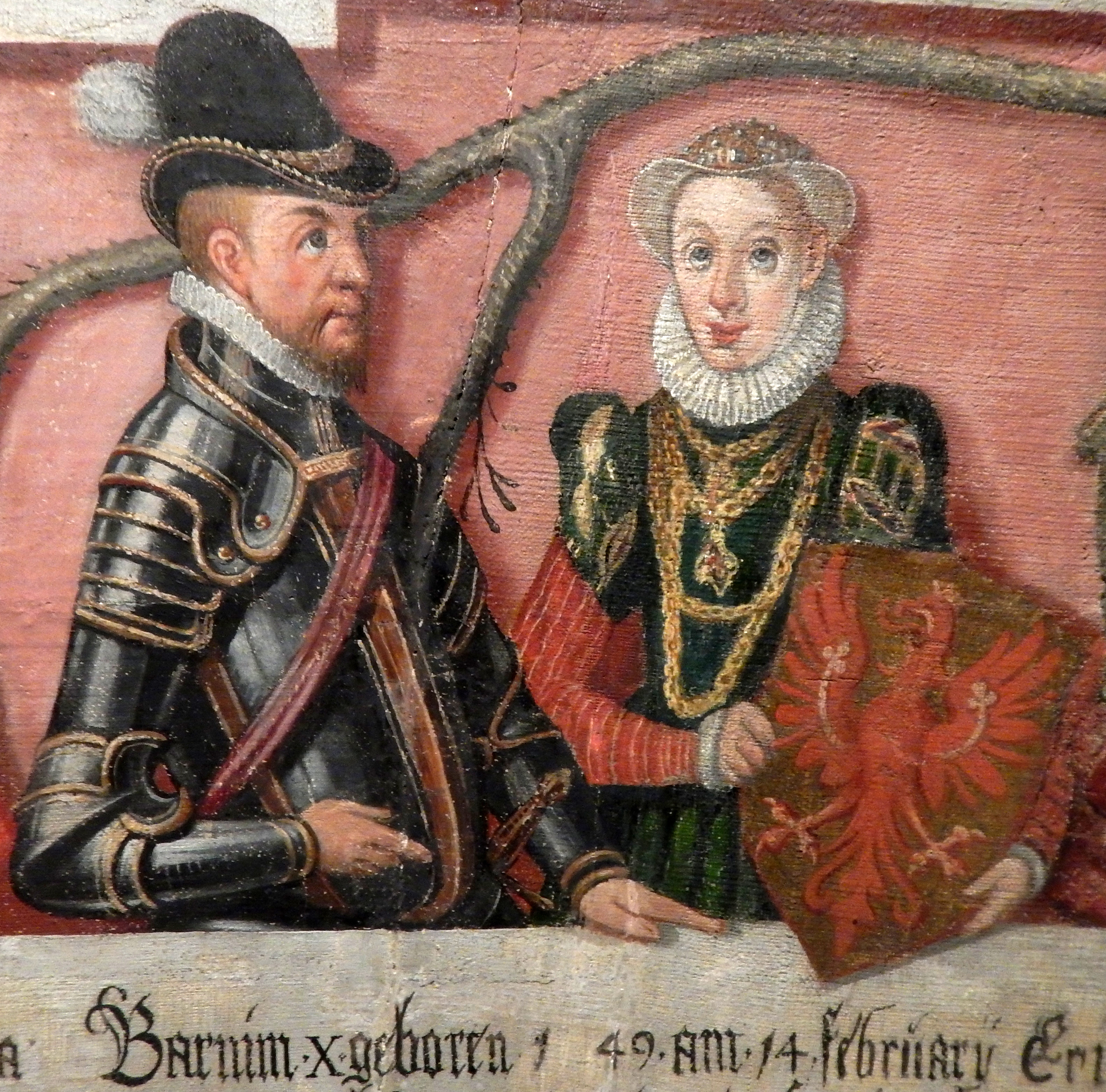
- Portrait of Anna Maria with her husband
- Born: 3 February 1567; Zechlin Palace, Rheinberg
- Died: 14 November 1618 (aged 51); Wolin
- Spouse: Barnim X, Duke of Pomerania
- House: Hohenzollern
- Father: John George, Elector of Brandenburg
- Mother: Sabina of Brandenburg-Ansbach

Anna Maria of Brandenburg (3 February 1567 in Zechlin Palace, Rheinberg – 14 November 1618 in Wolin) was a Princess of Brandenburg by birth and marriage Duchess of Pomerania.

== Life ==
Anna Maria was a daughter of the John George, Elector of Brandenburg (1525–1598), from his second marriage to Sabina of Brandenburg-Ansbach (1548–1575), daughter of the George, Margrave of Brandenburg-Ansbach.

In 1580, she was engaged to Barnim X, Duke of Pomerania of Pomerania and on 8 January 1581, she married him in Berlin. As her Wittum, she received the district of Bytów on the Kashubian border. They had no children. When Barnim inherited Pomerania in 1600, he left Bytów to his brother Casimir and Anna Maria received the district of Wolin, including the eponymous town and palace as her jointure.

After her husband died in 1603, Anna Maria lived at Wolin Castle in Wolin. Accurate records of the income and expenditure of the district of Wolin during her reign exist; they were less than the income of Bytów district and Anna Maria was compensated financially for the difference. She settled a dispute with Bogislaw XIII, Duke of Pomerania about the right to hunt in her district. After her death in 1618, her Wittum reverted to Francis, Duke of Pomerania.
