= Anna Jagiellon, Duchess of Pomerania =

Duchess of Pomerania from 1491 to 1503

Anna Jagiellon
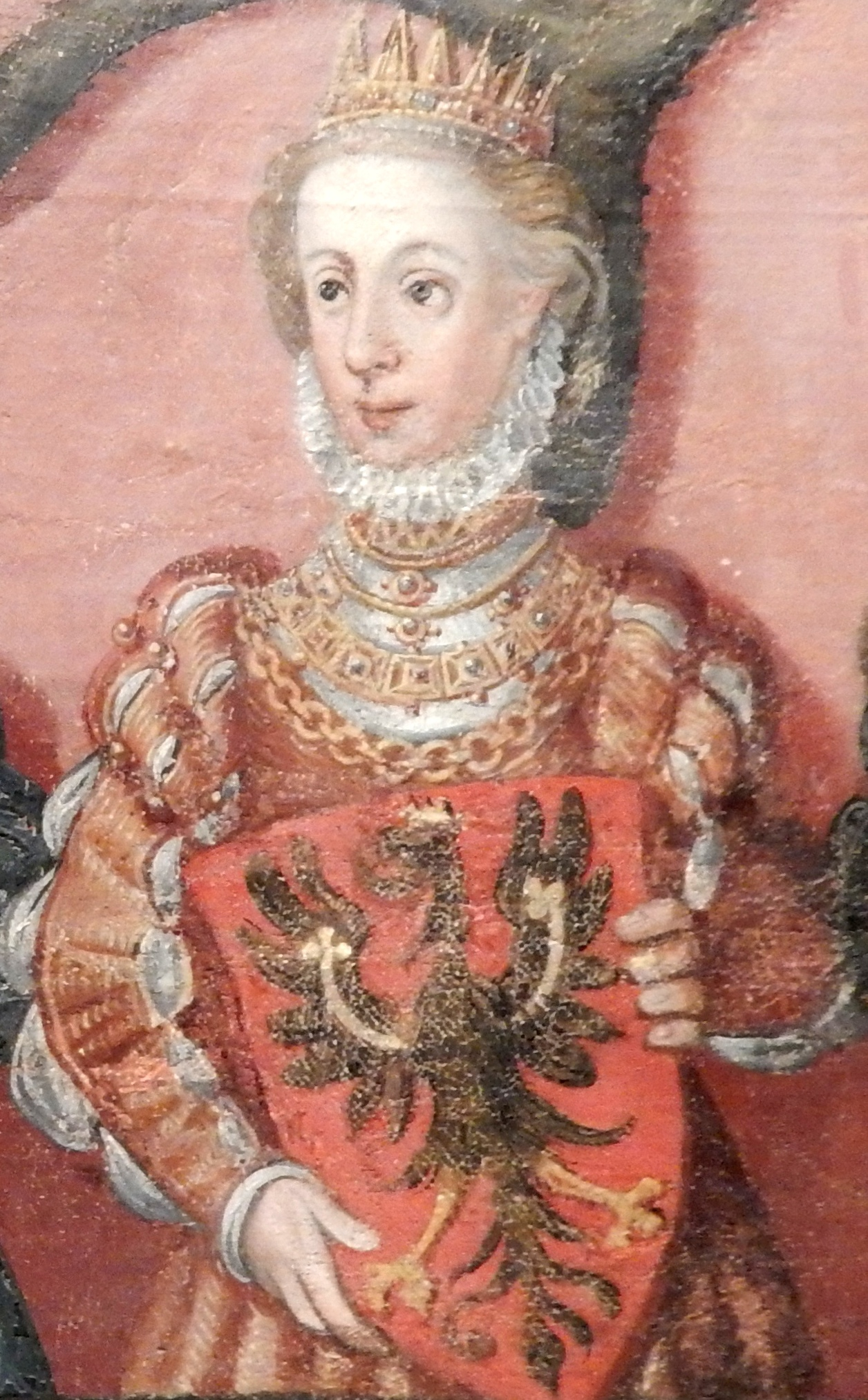

Duchess consort of Pomerania
- Tenure: 2 February 1491 – 12 August 1503
- Born: 12 March 1476; Nieszawa
- Died: 12 August 1503 (aged 27); Ueckermünde
- Burial: Eldena Abbey
- Spouse: Bogislaw X, Duke of Pomerania
- Issue Detail: Anna, Duchess of Brieg and Lubin; George I, Duke of Pomerania; Sophie, Queen of Denmark; Barnim IX, Duke of Pomerania
- House: Jagiellon
- Father: Casimir IV Jagiellon
- Mother: Elizabeth of Austria

Anna Jagiellon (/ˌjɑːɡjəˈləʊn/; Polish: Anna Jagiellonka, Lithuanian: Ona Jogailaitė, German: Anna Jagiellonica; 12 March 1476 – 12 August 1503) was a princess of the Kingdom of Poland and of the Grand Duchy of Lithuania, member of the Jagiellonian dynasty and by marriage Duchess of Pomerania.

Born in Nieszawa, she was the fifth daughter of King Casimir IV of Poland and Archduchess Elisabeth of Austria.

== Life ==
From November 1479 until the autumn of 1484 Anna lived in the Grand Duchy of Lithuania with her family, and later accompanied her parents on trips around Poland and Lithuania. There is no information about her early years and education.

Casimir IV wanted to arrange a marriage between Anna and Archduke Maximilian of Austria, son and heir of Emperor Frederick III. In the spring of 1486 Polish envoys arrived to Cologne to discuss the proposal and even showed a portrait of the princess, but the Habsburgs didn't show interest in the matter.

During 1489-1490 Mikołaj Kościelecki, Bishop of Chełm, arrived to Barth to begin the negotiations for a marriage between Anna and Bogislaw X, Duke of Pomerania. On 7 March 1490 in the city of Grodno, was signed an agreement about this matter by Adam Podewils (Governor of Białogard), Werner Schulenburg (Governor of Stettin (Szczecin)) and Bernard Roth as a representative of the Order of Malta. At the same time, was performed the marriage by proxy of Anna and Bogislaw X, who was replaced in the ceremony by Podewils.

Casimir IV gave his daughter the amount of 32,000 Hungarian złoty as a dowry, which were secured from the towns of Lauenburg, Lębork and Bytów. On 1 February 1491 Bogislaw X gave his bride as a wedding gift the districts of Rügenwalde, Białogard and Greifenberg. The complete payment of the princess' dowry lasted several decades. On 3 May 1526 King Sigismund I the Old received from Bogislaw X's sons the sum of 14,000 złoty in exchange for the transfer of Lębork and Bytów. The other 18,000 złoty were paid probably only in 1533.

Anna arrived to Łęczyca around 15 January 1491, from where she began her trip with her family to Pomerania. On 2 February in the city of Stettin took place the wedding ceremony between her and Bogislaw X. The event was very sumptuous and was attended, among others, by Sophie, Dowager Duchess of Pomerania and mother of Bogislaw X, and his brothers-in-law, Dukes Magnus II and Balthasar of Mecklenburg.

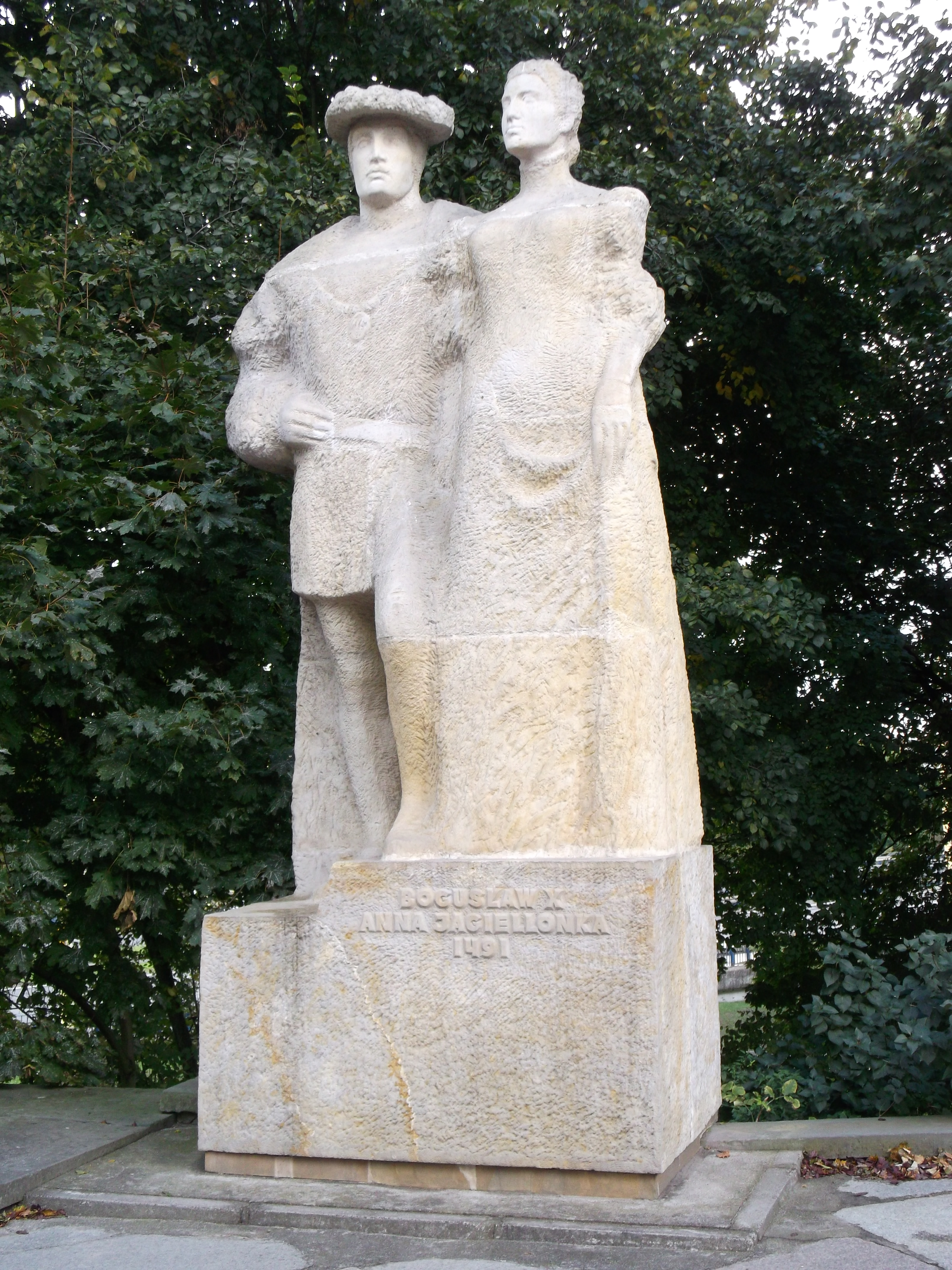
Monument of Bogislaw X and Anna. Ducal Castle, Szczecin.

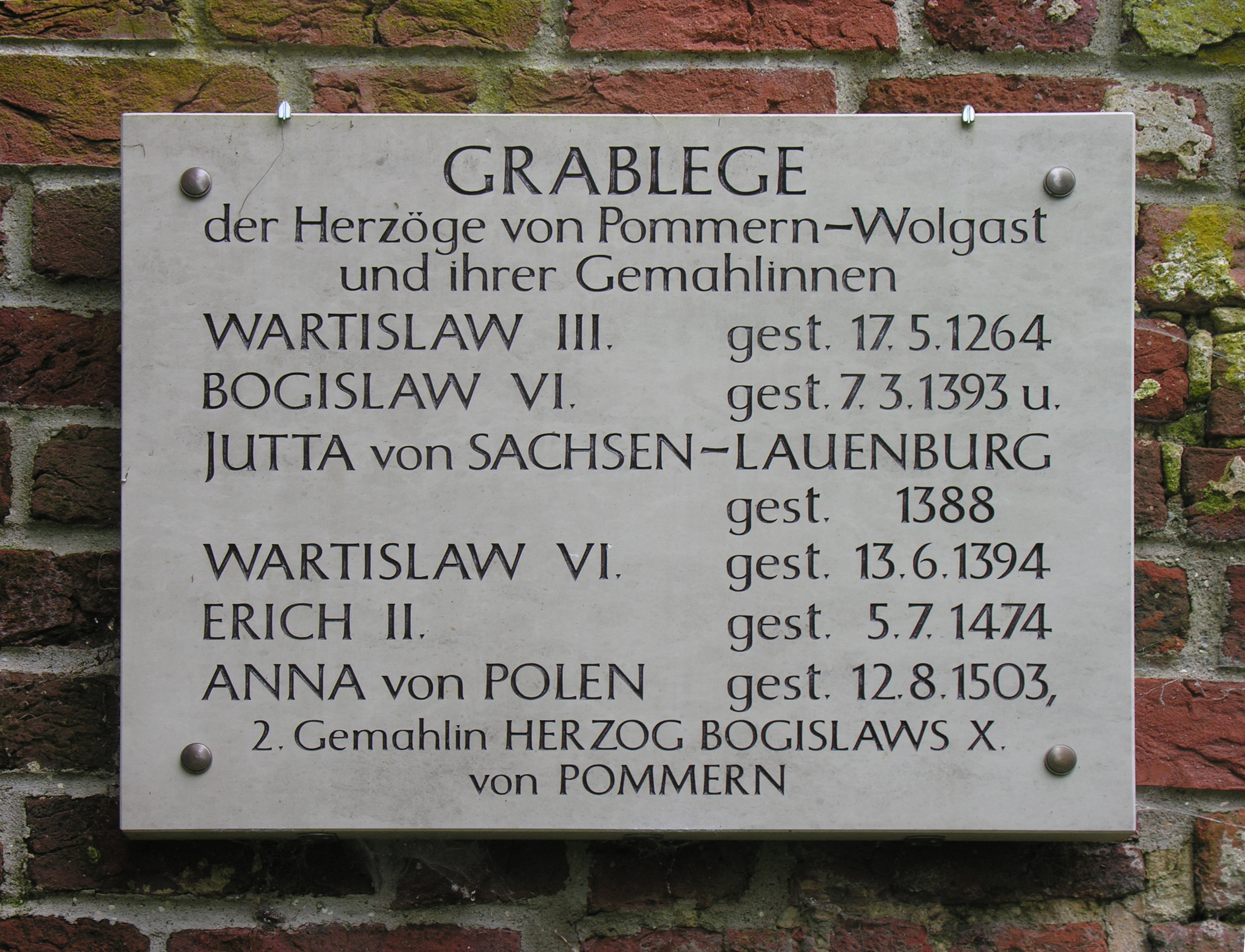
Commemorative plaque at Eldena Abbey.

At the time of her wedding, Anna was only 14 years old. She was the second wife of the Duke of Pomerania, whose first marriage with Margaret of Brandenburg (d. 1489) was turbulent and childless. For Bogislaw X, his new marriage reinforced his connections with Poland. His long dispute with Brandenburg ended in the sign of a treaty on 26 March 1493 in the city of Pyritz (Pyrzyce); as a mediator in this agreement, participated the Polish King John I Albert as a request of his brother-in-law.

The Ducal couple resided mainly in Stettin, where Bogislaw X renewed and expanded the local Castle. On 16 December 1496 Bogislaw X left his domains to support Emperor Maximilian I in his war against King Charles VIII of France. Later, he went on a pilgrimage to the Holy Land, from which he returned only on 12 April 1498. During his absence, the Regency of the Duchy was exercised by Benedikt von Waldstein, Bishop of Cammin and Chancellor Georg Kleist; however, Anna also participated in the government with minor documents, according to historian Fryderyk Papée.

In the autumn of 1503 a rebellion from Stettin subjects, forced Bogislaw X to move his family firstly to Gartz and later to Ueckermünde Castle, where Anna gave birth to her youngest child.

According to the reports of chronicler Thomas Kantzow, Anna became ill after she arrived to Ueckermünde, because there the walls are recently covered with lime, and this hit her on the heart. Modern historians, based on reports of chronicler Joachim von Wedel, speculated that the real cause of her death could be pneumonia or tuberculosis.

Anna died on 12 August 1503 in Ueckermünde and was buried at Eldena Abbey in Greifswald. The burial place of the Duchess was commemorated with a plaque placed in the ruins of the Abbey.

== Issue ==
Anna and Bogislaw X had eight children:

1. Anna of Pomerania (1492 – 25 April 1550), married on 9 June 1516 to Duke George I of Brieg.
2. George I, Duke of Pomerania (11 April 1493 – 9/10 May 1531).
3. Casimir (VIII) of Pomerania (28 April 1494 – 29 October 1518).
4. Sophie of Pomerania (1498 – 13 May 1568), married on 9 October 1518 to Frederick, Duke of Holstein-Schleswig, who became King Frederick I of Denmark in 1523.
5. Elisabeth of Pomerania (1499 – bef. 27 May 1518), abbess of Krummin Nunnery.
6. Barnim of Pomerania ( 12 April 1500 – bef. 2 December 1501).
7. Barnim IX, Duke of Pomerania (2 December 1501 – 2 November 1573).
8. Otto (IV) of Pomerania (bef. 12 August 1503 – bef. 1518)

== Ancestry ==
Ancestors of Anna Jagiellon

8. Algirdas, Grand Duke of Lithuania
4. Władysław II Jagiełło of Poland
9. Uliana Alexandrovna of Tver
2. Casimir IV of Poland
10. Andrew Ivanovich, Prince of Halshany
5. Sophia of Halshany
11. Alexandra Dimitrijewna of Drutsk
1. Anna Jagiellon
12. Albert IV, Duke of Austria
6. Albert II of Germany
13. Johanna Sophia of Bavaria
3. Elizabeth of Austria
14. Sigismund, Holy Roman Emperor
7. Elizabeth of Luxembourg
15. Barbara of Celje
