= George I of Pomerania =

Duke of Pomerania from 1523 to 1531

George I

Duke of Pomerania
- Reign: 5 October 1523 – 10 May 1531
- Predecessor: Bogislaw X
- Successor: Barnim IX; Philip I
- Born: 11 April 1493
- Died: 10 May 1531 (aged 38); Stettin
- Spouse: Amalie of the Palatinate; Margarete of Brandenburg
- Issue: Philip I, Duke of Pomerania
Names
- German: Georg I von Pommern; Polish: Jerzy I pomorski
- House: House of Griffin
- Father: Bogislaw X, Duke of Pomerania
- Mother: Anna of Poland

George I of Pomerania (German: Herzog Georg I. von Pommern; 11 April 1493 – 10 May 1531) was Duke of Pomerania from the House of Griffin.

== Life ==
George was the eldest son of Duke Bogislaw X of Pomerania and his second wife Anna of Poland, a daughter of King Casimir IV of Poland. He was named after his uncle and godfather, Duke Georg the Bearded of Saxony, who had married the younger sister of George's mother. As a child, George spent time at the court of his uncle and godfather in Saxony, which resulted in a lifetime friendship.

George essentially continued the policies of his father. He worked energetically on limiting the power of the cities and the nobility. He pursued a policy of limiting the suzerainty of Brandenburg. In 1493 he concluded with Elector John Cicero the Treaty of Pyritz by which Pomerania was to gain imperial immediacy within the Holy Roman Empire, of the same rank as Brandenburg, which again received the succession in Pomerania once the ducal house would become extinct in the male line. However, when - unlike as expected - the duke successfully procreated - John Cicero intrigued against Pomerania gaining imperial recognition as imperial estate.

After he and his brother Barnim IX took up government jointly, George showed an interest in the efforts of the Reformation, yet he personally remained faithful to the Catholic church. George was introduced to government by his father at an early age. In 1520 he was already active at the court of Emperor Charles V and participated in the Diet of Worms in 1521 and the Diet of Nuremberg in 1523.

When in 1524 a military conflict threatened with Brandenburg, George crafted an alliance with King Sigismund I of Poland, which was directed against Brandenburg and Duke Albert of Prussia and against the followers of the Reformation. Nevertheless, he failed to suppress the Reformation in his country; he could in the end only steer it onto moderate tracks.

After the Diet of Speyer in 1526 he tried to approach Brandenburg. Due to Brandenburg claims and the refusal of the Pomeranian estates to cooperate, the negotiations took until 1529. In the meantime, Brandenburg once again threatened to resolve the conflict using its military. But on 26 August 1529, a compromise was struck, the Treaty of Grimnitz, with Elector Joachim I of Brandenburg thanks to the mediation of the Dukes Eric I of Brunswick-Göttingen-Calenberg and Henry the Younger of Brunswick-Wolfenbüttel. George would marry Joachim's daughter Margaret of Brandenburg and Brandenburg would recognise Pomerania's imperial immediacy.

Domestically, a dispute with his brother Barnim IX, who wanted to divide the country, began after the Treaty of Grimnitz had been ratified. A large part of the Estates backed Barnim because they feared that once George had resolved the dispute with Brandenburg, he would turn his efforts against the reformation, and also because they were hoping that Barnim might be easier to influence than George. The situation changed somewhat after George died, aged 38, at Stettin, as his son and successor Philip I, joined the Reformation. Nevertheless, the country was split into Pomerania-Wolgast (ruled by Philip I) and Pomerania-Stettin (ruled by Barnim IX).

== Marriages and issue ==
George I was married twice. He first married Amalie (1490–1524), daughter of Elector Palatine Philip and Margaret of Bavaria, Electress Palatine. They had the following children:

- Bogislaw XI (1514–1514)
- Philip I (1515–1560) married to Maria of Saxony
- Margaret (1518–1569), married Duke Ernest III of Brunswick-Grubenhagen
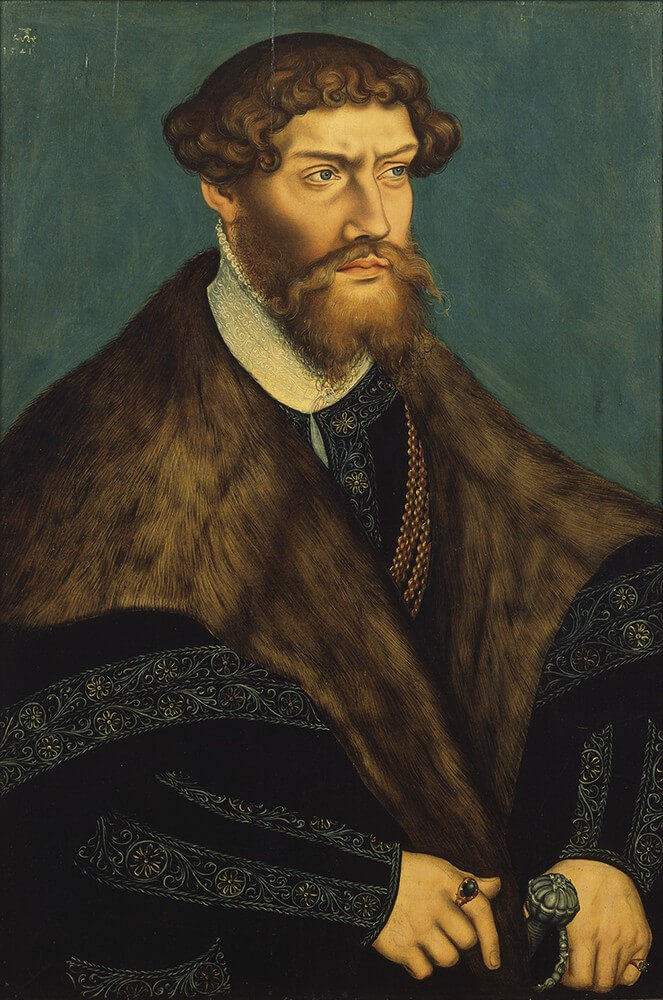
Portrait of Philip I of Pomerania by Lucas Cranach the Younger

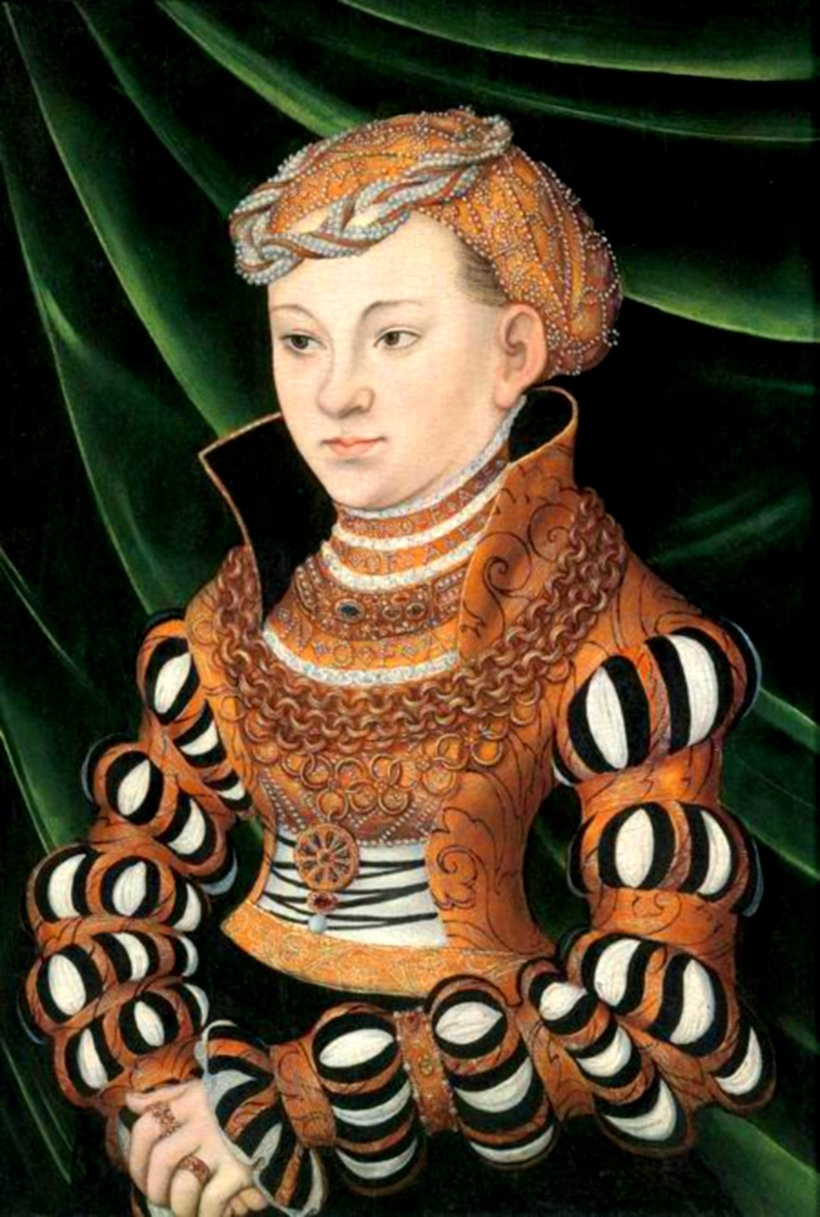
Maria of Saxony, by Lucas Cranach the Elder

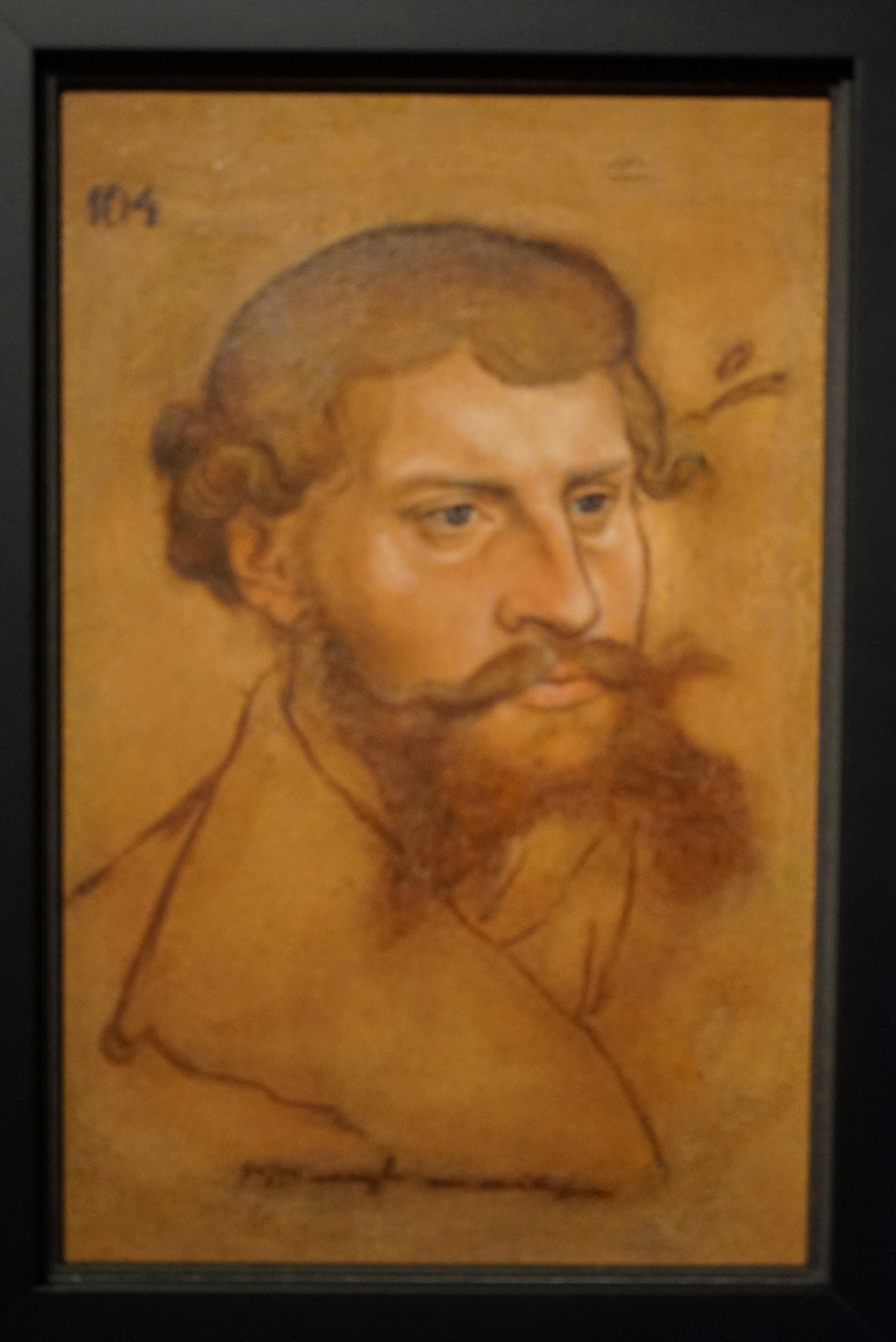
Ernest III, Duke of Brunswick-Grubenhagen by Cranach

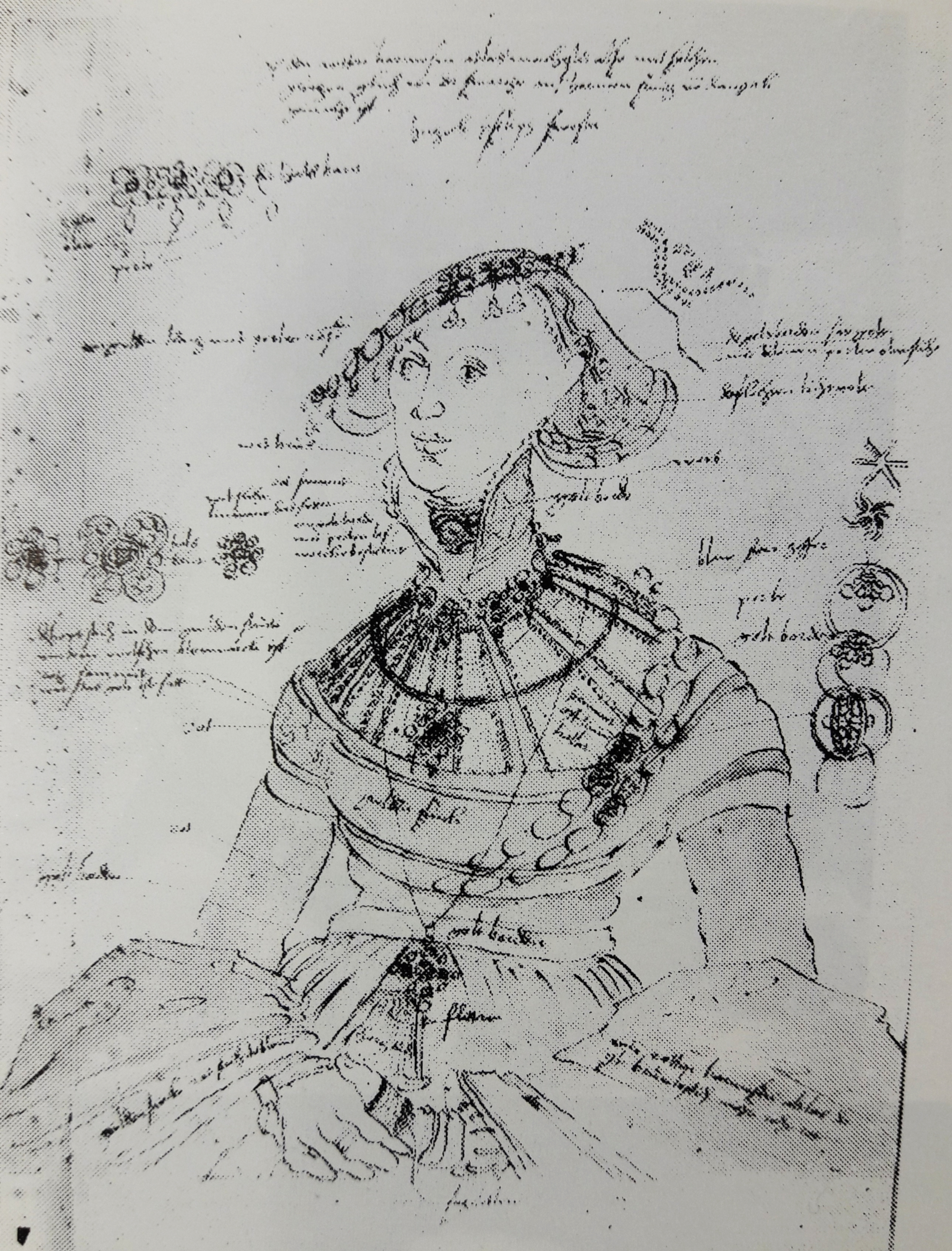
Princess Margaret of Pomerania-Wolgast (1518–1569) by Lucas Cranach the Elder

His second wife was Margarete of Brandenburg (1511–1577), daughter of Elector Joachim of Brandenburg and Elizabeth of Denmark. They had one daughter:

- Georgia (1531–1574), married Count Stanislaus Latalski of Labischin

== Ancestors ==
Ancestors of George I of Pomerania

Wartislaw IX of Pomerania-Wolgast (1400–1457)
Eric II of Pomerania (1425–1474)
Sophie of Saxe-Lauenburg-Ratzeburg
Bogislaw X, Duke of Pomerania (1454–1523)
Bogislaw IX of Pomerania-Stolp (1407–1446)
Sophia of Pomerania-Stolp
Maria of Mazovia
George I, Duke of Pomerania (1493–1531)
Władysław II Jagiełło (1348–1434)
Casimir IV Jagiellon (1427–1492)
Sophia of Halshany (1405–1461)
Anna Jagiellonica (1476–1503)
Emperor Albert II of Habsburg (1397–1439)
Elisabeth of Austria (1436–1505)
Elisabeth of Luxembourg (1409–1442)

George I of Pomerania House of Griffins Born: 11 April 1493 Died: 9 or 10 May 1531
Preceded by Bogislaw X	Dukes of Pomerania; 1523–1531 with his brother Barnim IX (1523–1532)	Succeeded by Barnim IX; Philip I
