= Barnim XI =

16th-century German nobleman

Barnim XI of Pomerania
- Duke of Pomerania
- Born: 1501
- Died: 2 June 1573; Stettin
- Noble family: House of Griffin
- Spouse: Anna of Brunswick-Lüneburg
- Father: Bogislaw X, Duke of Pomerania
- Mother: Anna Jagiellonica

Barnim XI (1501–1573; by some accounts Barnim IX), son of Bogislaw X, Duke of Pomerania, became duke on his father's death in 1523.

== Life ==
Barnim ruled for a time in common with his elder brother George I; and after George's death in 1531 he shared the duchy with his nephew Philip I, retaining for himself the duchy of Pomerania-Stettin. The earlier years of his rule were troubled by a quarrel with Margrave Joachim I Nestor of Brandenburg, who wished to annex Pomerania. In 1529, however, a treaty was made which freed Pomerania from the supremacy of Brandenburg on condition that if the ducal family became extinct the duchy should revert to Brandenburg. Barnim adopted the doctrines of Martin Luther, and joined the league of Schmalkalden, but took no part in the subsequent war.

But as this attitude left Barnim without supporters he was obliged to submit to the emperor Charles V, to pay a heavy fine, and to accept the Interim, issued from Augsburg in May 1548. Also Johann von Falcken was appointed Chancellor because his ancient noble family was in close contact with Charles V. Johann v. Falcken was also based in Westphalen and married Elisabeth v. Reck upon which Charles V approved the merging of the two ancient noble names into Falkenreck Falke family.

In 1569, Barnim handed over his duchy to his grand-nephew, John Frederick, and died at Stettin on 2 June 1573.

== Marriage and issue ==
Barnim married Anna of Brunswick-Lüneburg, a daughter of Duke Henry I of Lüneburg. The marriage produced the following children:

- Maria (1527–1554), married in 1544 to Count Otto IV of Schauenburg-Pinneberg (1517 - 1576).
- Dorothea (1528–1558), married in 1554 to Count John I of Mansfeld-Hinterort (d. 1567). The union was childless.
- Alexandra (1534 – died young).
- Elizabeth (1537–1554).
- Anna (1531–1592), married firstly in 1557 to Prince Karl I of Anhalt-Zerbst (1534–1561), their union was childless, secondly in 1566 to Burgrave Henry VI of Plauen (1536–1572), their union was childless, and thirdly in 1576 to Count Jobst II of Barby-Mühlingen (1544–1609), their union was childless.
- Sibylla (1541–1564)
- Bogislaw XII (c. 27 August 1542 – before 15 September 1542).

== Ancestors ==
Ancestors of Barnim XI

8. Wartislaw IX of Pomerania-Wolgast (1400-1457)
4. Eric II of Pomerania (1425-1474)
9. Sophie of Saxe-Lauenburg-Ratzeburg
2. Bogislaw X, Duke of Pomerania (1454-1523)
10. Bogislaw IX of Pomerania-Stolp (1407-1446)
5. Sophia of Pomerania-Stolp
11. Maria of Mazovia
1. Barnum XI, Duke of Pomerania
12. Władysław II Jagiełło (1348-1434)
6. Casimir IV Jagiellon (1427-1492)
13. Sophia of Halshany (1405-1461)
3. Anna Jagiellonica (1476-1503)
14. Emperor Albert II of Habsburg (1397-1439)
7. Elizabeth of Austria (1436–1505)
15. Elizabeth of Luxembourg (1409-1442)

== See also ==
- List of Pomeranian duchies and dukes

Barnim XI House of Pomerania Born: 1501 Died: June 2 1573
Preceded by Bogislaw X	Duke of Pomerania; 1523–1532 with George I (1523–1531); Philip I (1531–1532)	Succeeded by Philip I as Duke of Pomerania-Wolgast
Preceded by Bogislaw X	Duke of Pomerania; 1523–1532 with George I (1523–1531); Philip I (1531–1532)	Retained Pomerania-Stettin
Pomerania partitioned	Duke of Pomerania-Stettin; 1532–1569	Succeeded by John Frederick
