= Bogislaw X =

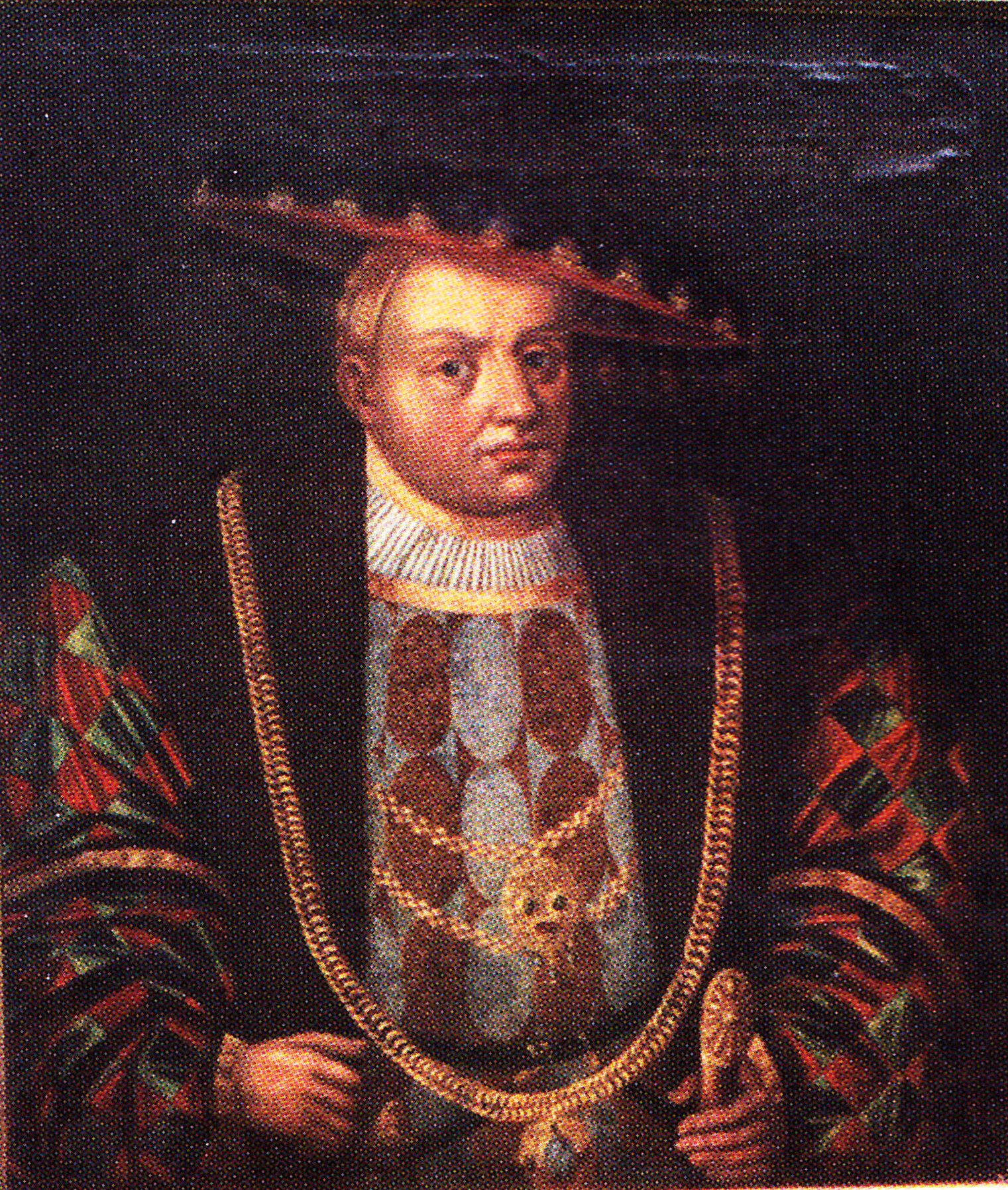
- Anonymous portrait c. 1650

Duke of Pomerania Duke of Pomerania-Barth
- Reign: 17 December 1478 – 5 October 1523
- Predecessor: Wartislaw X
- Successor: George I and Barnim IX

Duke of Pomerania-Wolgast-Stolp-Stettin
- Reign: 5 July 1474 – 17 December 1478
- Predecessor: Eric II
- Born: 3 June 1454; Rügenwalde (now Darłowo)
- Died: 5 October 1523 (aged 69); Stettin (now Szczecin)
- Spouse: Margaret of Brandenburg; Anna of Poland
- Issue: Anna, Duchess of Brieg and Lubin; George I, Duke of Pomerania; Sophie, Queen of Denmark; Barnim XI, Duke of Pomerania
Names
- German: Bogislaw X von Pommern; Polish: Bogusław X pomorski
- House: House of Griffin
- Father: Eric II, Duke of Pomerania
- Mother: Sophia of Pomerania-Stolp

Bogislaw X of Pomerania, the Great, (3 June 1454 – 5 October 1523) was Duke of Pomerania from 1474 until his death in 1523.

== Biography ==
Bogislaw was born in Rügenwalde (now Darłowo, Poland). His parents were Eric II, Duke of Pomerania-Wolgast, and Sophia of Pomerania, both members of the House of Pomerania . Bogislaw was first married to Margaret of Brandenburg and later to Anna, daughter of the Polish king Casimir IV Jagiellon. With his second wife he had eight children, including Sophia, who became queen of Denmark. He inherited all of the previously partitioned Duchy of Pomerania and became its sole ruler in 1478. He was succeeded by his sons George I and Barnim XI.

Before Bogislaw's reign, the Duchy of Pomerania had for a long time been divided into several splinter duchies, ruled by relatives of the Griffin house. In 1464, Pomerania-Stettin's duke Otto III died without an heir, Bogislaw's father Eric II and his uncle, Wartislaw X, both ruling different portions of Pomerania-Wolgast, managed to succeed in a conflict about Pomerania-Stettin inheritance with the Margraviate of Brandenburg. In 1474, with his father's death, Bogislaw inherited his splinter duchy, becoming Duke of Pomerania. In 1478 with his uncle's death, he also inherited his splinter duchy, Pomerania-Barth, becoming the first sole ruler in the Duchy of Pomerania since about 200 years.

His father, Eric II, had left Pomerania in tense conflicts with Brandenburg and Mecklenburg. Bogislaw managed to resolve these conflicts by both diplomatic and military means. He married his sister, Sophia, to Magnus II, Duke of Mecklenburg, and his other sister, Margarete, was married to Magnus's brother Balthasar. Bogislaw himself married Margarete, daughter of Brandenburg's Prince-elector Frederick II. Also, in 1478, Bogislaw regained areas lost to Brandenburg by his father, most notably the town of Gartz and other small towns and castles north of the Brandenburgian Uckermark. He confirmed the 1472 Peace of Prenzlau in 1479, leaving Strasburg with Brandenburg and Bogislaw had to take his possessions as a fief from Brandenburg. In the same year, his wife died before they had children.

When Bogislaw married Anna of Poland on 2 February 1491, all of Pomerania's neighbors were tied to the House of Pomerania by marriage. Bogislaw made use of these favourable conditions in 1493, and strengthened Pomerania's position towards Brandenburg in the Treaty of Pyritz, which declared Pomerania not a fief of Brandenburg, but a fief of the Holy Roman Emperor.

From 1496 to 1498, Bogislaw travelled to Jerusalem as a pilgrim. He died in Stettin.

== Children ==
by Anna Jagiellon:

- Anna of Pomerania, Duchess of Lubin (1492–1550), married George I of Brieg in 1521. Their union was childless.
- George I, Duke of Pomerania (1493–1531)
- Kasimir VIII (28 April 1494 – 29 October 1518)
- Sophie of Pomerania, Queen of Denmark (1498–1568), married Frederick I of Denmark in 1525
- Barnim IX, Duke of Pomerania (1501–1573)
- Elisabeth (died before 1518), abbess of Krummin Nunnery
- Barnim (before 1501 – before 1501)
- Otto (before 1503 – before 1518)

illegitimate:

- Christoph, archdeacon of Usedom as of 1508

== Ancestors ==
Ancestors of Bogislaw X

8. Barnim VI, Duke of Pomerania-Wolgast
4. Wartislaw IX, Duke of Pomerania-Wolgast
9. Veronica of Nuremberg
2. Eric II, Duke of Pomerania
10. Eric IV, Duke of Saxe-Lauenburg
5. Sophie of Saxe-Lauenburg-Ratzeburg
11. Sophie of Brunswick-Lüneburg
1. Bogislaw X, Duke of Pomerania
12. Bogislaw VIII, Duke of Pomerania-Stolp
6. Bogislaw IX, Duke of Pomerania-Stolp
13. Sophie of Holstein-Rendsburg
3. Sophie of Pomerania, Duchess of Pomerania-Stolp
14. Siemowit IV, Duke of Masovia
7. Maria of Masovia
15. Alexandra of Lithuania

== Sources ==
- Gottfried von Bülow (1876). "Bogislaw X." . Allgemeine Deutsche Biographie (in German). Vol. 3. Leipzig: Duncker & Humblot. pp. 48–55.

Bogislaw X House of Pomerania Born: 3 June 1454 Died: 5 October 1523
Preceded by Eric II	Duke of Pomerania-Barth; 1474–1523	Succeeded by George I Barnim IX
Preceded by Wartislaw X	Duke of Pomerania-Wolgast; 1478–1523	Succeeded by George I Barnim IX
