= Clara Maria of Pomerania-Barth =

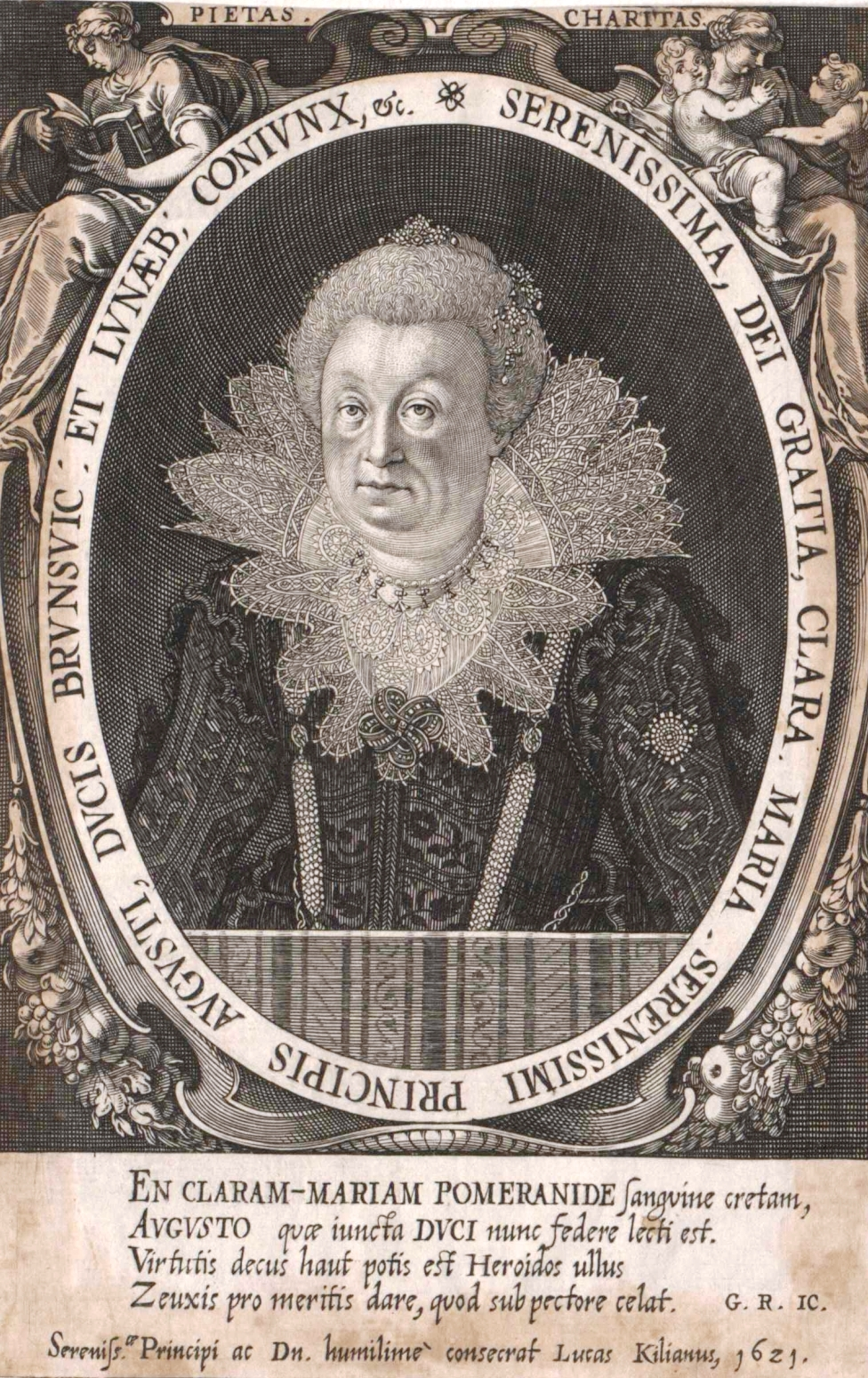
- Portrait by Lucas Kilian, 1621
- Born: 10 July 1574; Franzburg
- Died: 19 February 1623 (aged 48); Hitzacker
- Spouse: Sigismund August of Mecklenburg-Schwerin (m. 1593; died 1600) Augustus the Younger of Brunswick-Dannenberg-Hitzacker (m. 1607)
- Father: Bogislaw XIII, Duke of Pomerania-Barth
- Mother: Clara of Brunswick-Lüneburg

Clara Maria of Pomerania-Barth (10 July 1574 – 19 February 1623) was a member of the House of Griffins and by her two marriages Duchess of Mecklenburg-Schwerin-Ivenack and Brunswick-Dannenberg-Hitzacker.

Born in Franzburg, she was the second child and eldest daughter of Bogislaw XIII, Duke of Pomerania-Barth by his first wife, Clara of Brunswick-Lüneburg.

== Life ==
Clara Maria belonged to the last generation of the House of Griffins, who ruled the Duchy of Pomerania since the 12th century; from her ten siblings, only one sister, Anna (by marriage Duchess-Consort of Croy and Havré), produced surviving offspring.

In Barth on 7 October 1593, Clara Maria married firstly Sigismund August, youngest son of John Albert I, Duke of Mecklenburg-Schwerin. Because of his reported "weaked mind", he was effectively disinherited by his father's will and awarded with a pension of 6,000 florins, although he received the rights to live in the towns of Strelitz, Mirow and Ivenack but without real government over them. After her marriage, Clara Maria resided in Ivenack with her husband, where, after almost seven years of childless union, he died on 5 September 1600.

In Strelitz on 13 December 1607, Clara Maria married secondly Augustus the Younger, Lord of Hitzacker, son of Henry, Duke of Brunswick-Dannenberg.

They had two children:

- Stillborn daughter (Scharnebeck, 17 April 1609)
- Stillborn son (Hitzacker, 10 May 1610)

Clara Maria died in Hitzacker aged 48 without surviving issue. She was buried in the Stadtkirche, Dannenberg.
