= George II of Pomerania =

Non-reigning Duke of Pomerania (1582–1617)

George II, Duke of Pomerania
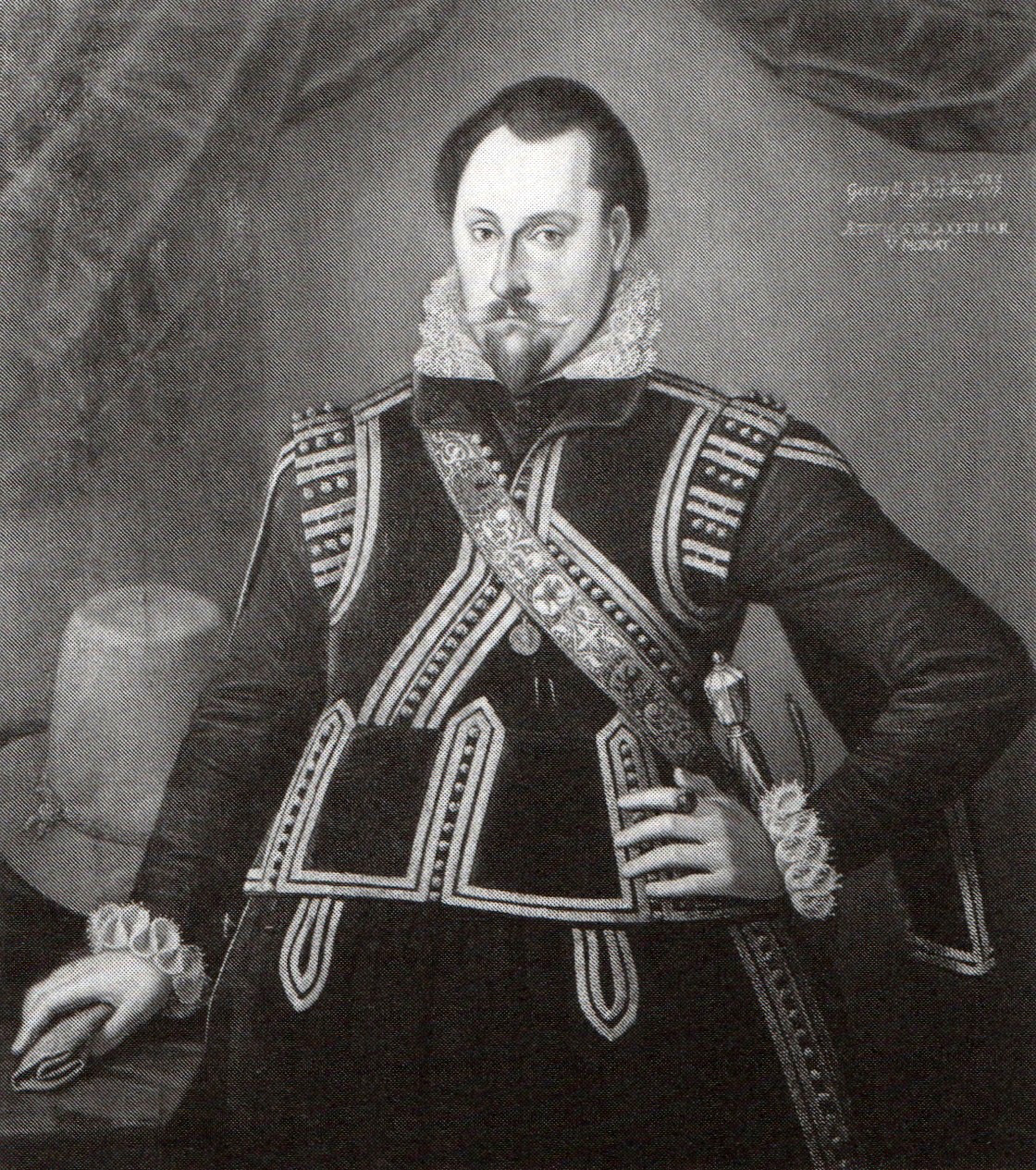
- Portrait, c. 1615
- Born: 30 January 1582; Barth
- Died: 27 March 1617 (aged 35); Bukowo Morskie
- Buried: Castle Church in Szczecin
- Noble family: House of Griffin
- Father: Bogislaw XIII, Duke of Pomerania
- Mother: Clara of Brunswick

George II of Pomerania (30 January 1582, in Barth – 27 March 1617, in Seebuckow, Rügenwalde (after 1945 Bukowo Morskie, Darlowo)) was a non-reigning duke of Pomerania. He administered the district of Rügenwalde from 1606 to 1617 jointly with his brother Bogislaw XIV.

== Life ==
George was a member of the last generation of the ruling House of Griffin in Pomerania. He was born in 1582 as a younger son of Duke Bogislaw XIII and his first wife, Clara of Brunswick. George and his brothers agreed on the division of the inheritance after the death of their father. Following the agreement of 1 October 1606 the eldest brother, Philip II (1573–1618) was the reigning Duke of Pomerania-Stettin, Francis (1577–1620) was a Protestant Bishop of Cammin. George together with his older brother Bogislaw XIV (1580–1637) received the district of Rügenwalde. The youngest brother Ulrich initially received only an annual pension.

In Rügenwalde, George dealt exclusively with hunting and took no part in the affairs of state. He lost sight in his left eye when firing a gun.

Duke George remained unmarried. He died in 1617 in Buckow in his district Rügenwalde and was buried in the Castle Church in Szczecin.

== Ancestors ==
Ancestors of George II of Pomerania

16. Bogislaw X, Duke of Pomerania
8. George I, Duke of Pomerania
17. Anna Jagiellonica
4. Philip I, Duke of Pomerania
18. Philip, Elector Palatine
9. Amalie of the Palatinate
19. Margaret of Bavaria, Electress Palatine
2. Bogislaw XIII, Duke of Pomerania
20. Ernest, Elector of Saxony (= 26)
10. John, Elector of Saxony
21. Elisabeth of Bavaria, Electress of Saxony (= 27)
5. Maria of Saxony, Duchess of Pomerania
22. Waldemar VI, Prince of Anhalt-Köthen
11. Margaret of Anhalt-Köthen
23. Margaret of Schwarzburg-Blankenburg
1. George II, Duke of Pomerania
24. Otto V, Duke of Brunswick-Lüneburg
12. Henry I of Lüneburg
25. Anne of Nassau-Siegen
6. Francis, Duke of Brunswick-Lüneburg
26. Ernest, Elector of Saxony (= 20)
13. Margarete of Saxony
27. Elisabeth of Bavaria, Electress of Saxony (= 21)
3. Clara of Brunswick-Lüneburg
28. John V, Duke of Saxe-Lauenburg
14. Magnus I, Duke of Saxe-Lauenburg
29. Dorothea of Brandenburg, Duchess of Saxe-Lauenburg
7. Clara of Saxe-Lauenburg
30. Henry IV, Duke of Brunswick-Lüneburg
15. Catherine of Brunswick-Wolfenbüttel, Duchess of Saxe-Lauenburg
31. Catherine of Pomerania, Duchess of Brunswick-Lüneburg

== See also ==
- List of Pomeranian duchies and dukes

George II of Pomerania House of Griffins Born: 30 January 1582 Died: 27 March 1617
Preceded by Bogislaw XIII	Duke of Pomerania-Rügenwalde (Darłowo); 1606–1617 with his brother Bogislaw XIV (1606–1620)	Succeeded by Bogislaw XIV
