= Ulrich, Duke of Pomerania =

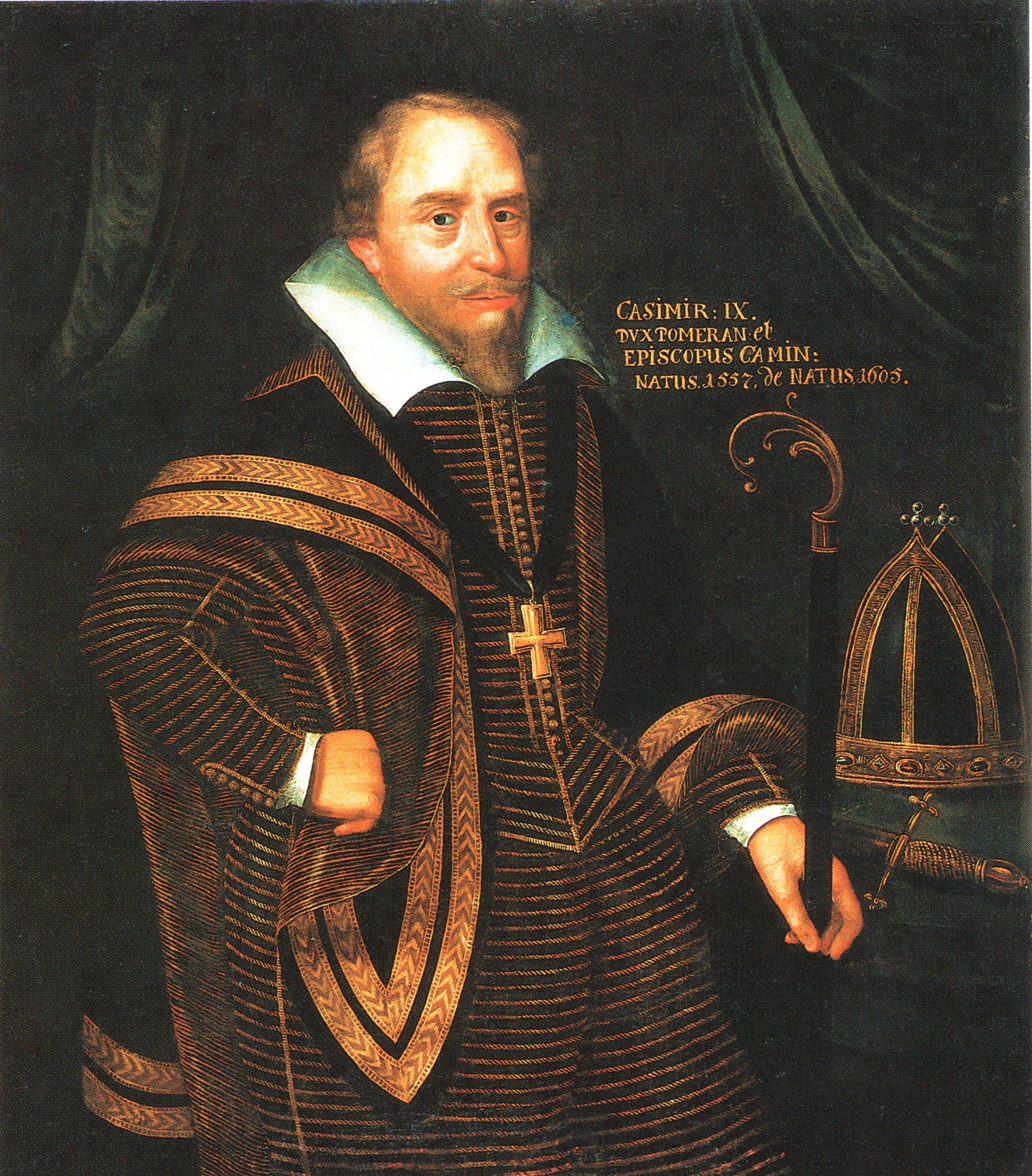
- Born: 12 August 1589; Barth
- Died: 31 October 1622 (aged 33); Pribbernow (renamed in 1945 as Przybiernów)
- Burial: Castle church in Stettin
- Spouse: Hedwig of Brunswick-Wolfenbüttel
- House: House of Griffin
- Father: Bogislaw XIII, Duke of Pomerania
- Mother: Clara of Brunswick-Lüneburg

Duke Ulrich of Pomerania (12 August 1589, in Barth – 31 October 1622, in Przybiernów), was a Lutheran administrator of the Prince-Bishopric of Cammin and non-reigning Duke of Pomerania.

== Life ==
Ulrich was the youngest son of Duke Bogislaw XIII of Pomerania (1544–1606), from the Griffins family. After their father's death, Ulrich and his brothers agreed on the division of their inheritance. According to the agreement of 1 October 1606 the eldest brother, Philip II (1573–1618), became the reigning Duke of Pomerania-Stettin. Francis (1577–1620) was a Protestant Bishop of Cammin. Bogislaw XIV (1580–1637) and George II (1582–1617) jointly received the district of Rügenwalde. Ulrich, the youngest received only an annual pension.

After Philip II died in 1618, he was succeeded by Francis as the ruler of Pomerania-Stettin, and Francis was succeeded by Ulrich as bishop of Cammin. Like Francis before him, Ulrich resided in Koszalin. Ulrich died on 31 October 1622. He was buried in the castle church in Stettin.

The historian Martin Wehrmann (1861-1937) described Ulrich as a "fresh, young man, who had kept a benign happiness with his wife at his court in Koszalin".

== Marriage ==
Ulrich married in 1619 in Wolfenbüttel with Hedwig of Brunswick-Wolfenbüttel (1595–1650). The marriage remained childless. After Ulrich's death, Duchess Hedwig resided as a widow in Neustettin. There, she founded a gymnasium in 1640, which was later named Hedwig's gymnasium, after her.

== Footnotes ==
Ulrich, Duke of Pomerania House of Griffins Born: 12 August 1589 in Barth Died: 31 October 1622 in Pribbernow
| Preceded by Francis | Administrator of Cammin prince-bishopric 1618–1622 | Succeeded by Bogislaw XIV |
