= Ernst Bogislaw von Croÿ =

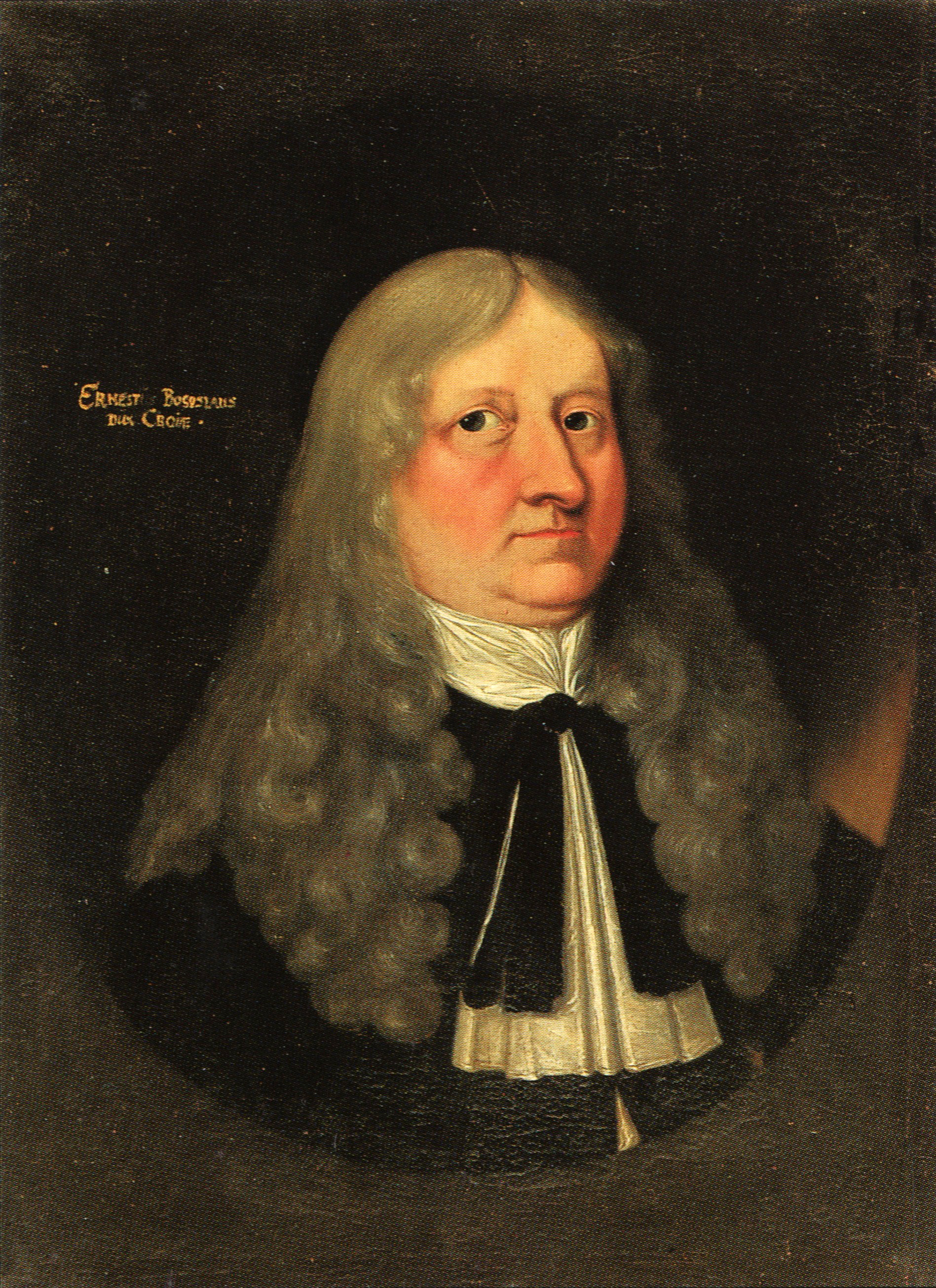
Ernst Bogislaw von Croÿ

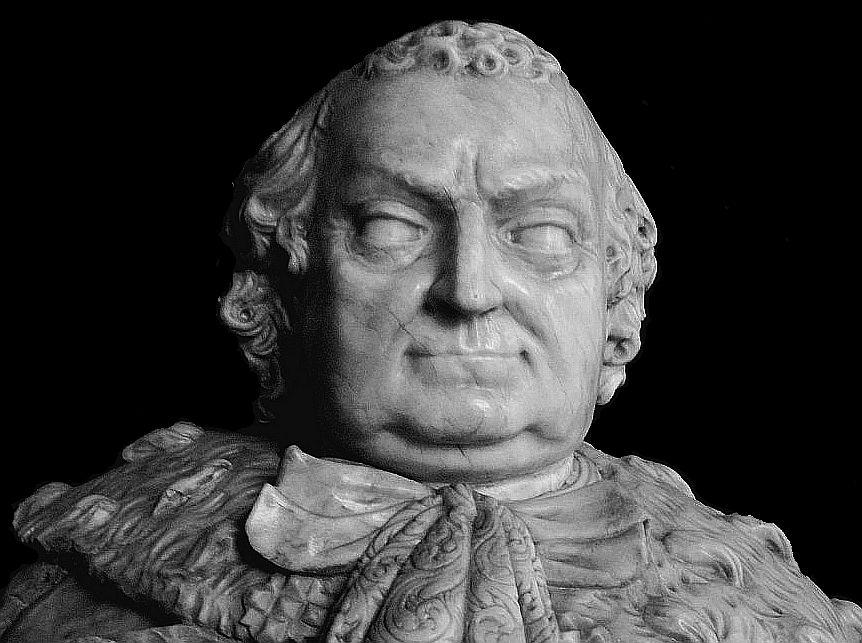
Effigy of Ernst Bogislaw von Croÿ in the Church of St Hyacinth, Słupsk.

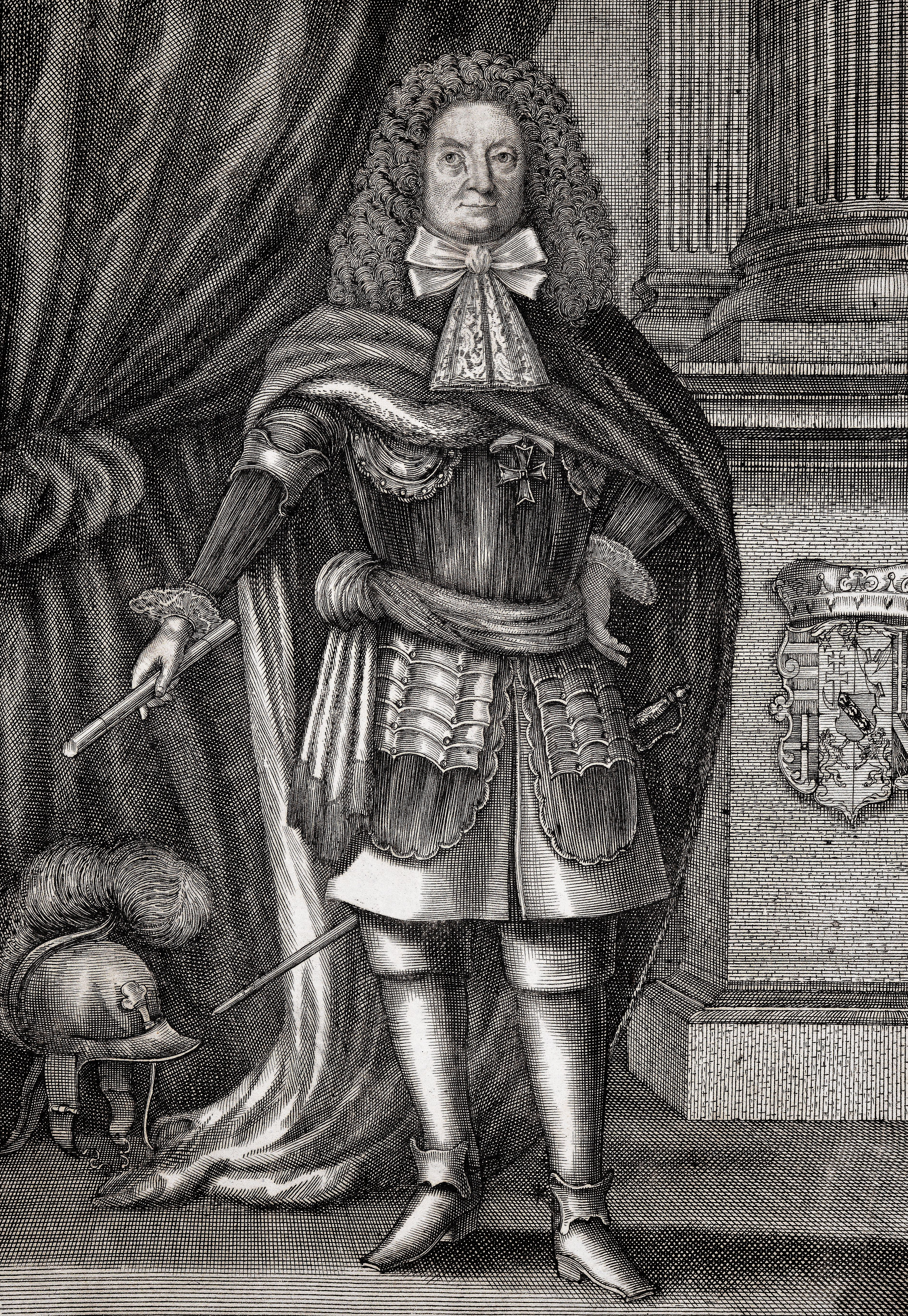
Ernst Bogislaw von Croÿ, anonymous copper engraving, ca. 1680.

Ernst Bogislaw von Croÿ (26 August 1620, in Finstingen (Fénétrange) – 7 February 1684, in Königsberg) was a Lutheran Administrator of the Prince-Bishopric of Cammin and official in the service of Brandenburg-Prussia.

== Family ==
Ernst Bogislaw was born in Finstingen as the son of Ernst von Croÿ (1588–1620), prince and duke of Croÿ, and Anna of Pomerania (1590–1660), daughter of Bogislaw XIII, Duke of Pomerania. Ernst was the son of Charles Philippe de Cröy, Marquis d’Havré (1549–1613), who was the only son of Philippe II of Croÿ by his second wife, Anna of Lorraine.

Although the House of Croÿ was Roman Catholic, his parents' marriage contract called for a Protestant education for their children. A few weeks after Ernst Bogislaw was born, his father fell ill and died on 7 October 1620 near Oppenheim while campaigning during the Thirty Years' War for Ferdinand II, Holy Roman Emperor. Hostile to her husband's family, Anna fled with Ernst Bogislaw to Stettin (Szczecin), the capital of the Duchy of Pomerania.

Ernst Bogislaw began studying at the University of Greifswald in 1634. His uncle, Bogislaw XIV, Duke of Pomerania, granted him lordship over Naugard (Nowogard) and Massow (Maszewo). When Bogislaw XIV, the last duke of the House of Pomerania, died in 1637, Ernst Bogislaw inherited the late ruler's personal possessions.

From 1637 to 1650 Ernst Bogislaw was the administrator of the Prince-Bishopric of Cammin; the prince-bishopric was promised to Brandenburg-Prussia in the 1648 Treaty of Westphalia. In 1650 he renounced his rights to the prince-bishopric in return for a large payment and the expectancy to his mother's Pomeranian pension. Ernst Bogislaw entered the service of Frederick William, Elector of Brandenburg, and served as Statthalter (prime minister) of Farther Pomerania from 1665 to 1670 and then as Statthalter of Prussia from 1670 to 1684.

Ernst Bogislaw completed his will shortly before his death. With permission from the authorities of Swedish Pomerania, he bequeathed to the University of Greifswald his assets, including books, the signet ring of Bogislaw XIV, the golden chain of Ernst Ludwig, Duke of Pomerania, and the Croy Tapestry. After his death in Königsberg in Prussia, Ernst Bogislaw was buried next to his mother in the palace church of Stolp (Słupsk).

Ernst Bogislaw von Croÿ House of Croÿ Born: 26 August 1620 in Finstingen Died: 6 February 1684 in Königsberg in Prussia
Regnal titles
Preceded by Bogislaw XIV	Administrator of Cammin prince-bishopric 1637–1650	prince-bishopric secularised as principality and merged in Brandenburgian Pomerania
