= Philip II of Pomerania =

Pomeranian Duke

Philip II, Duke of Pomerania-Stettin
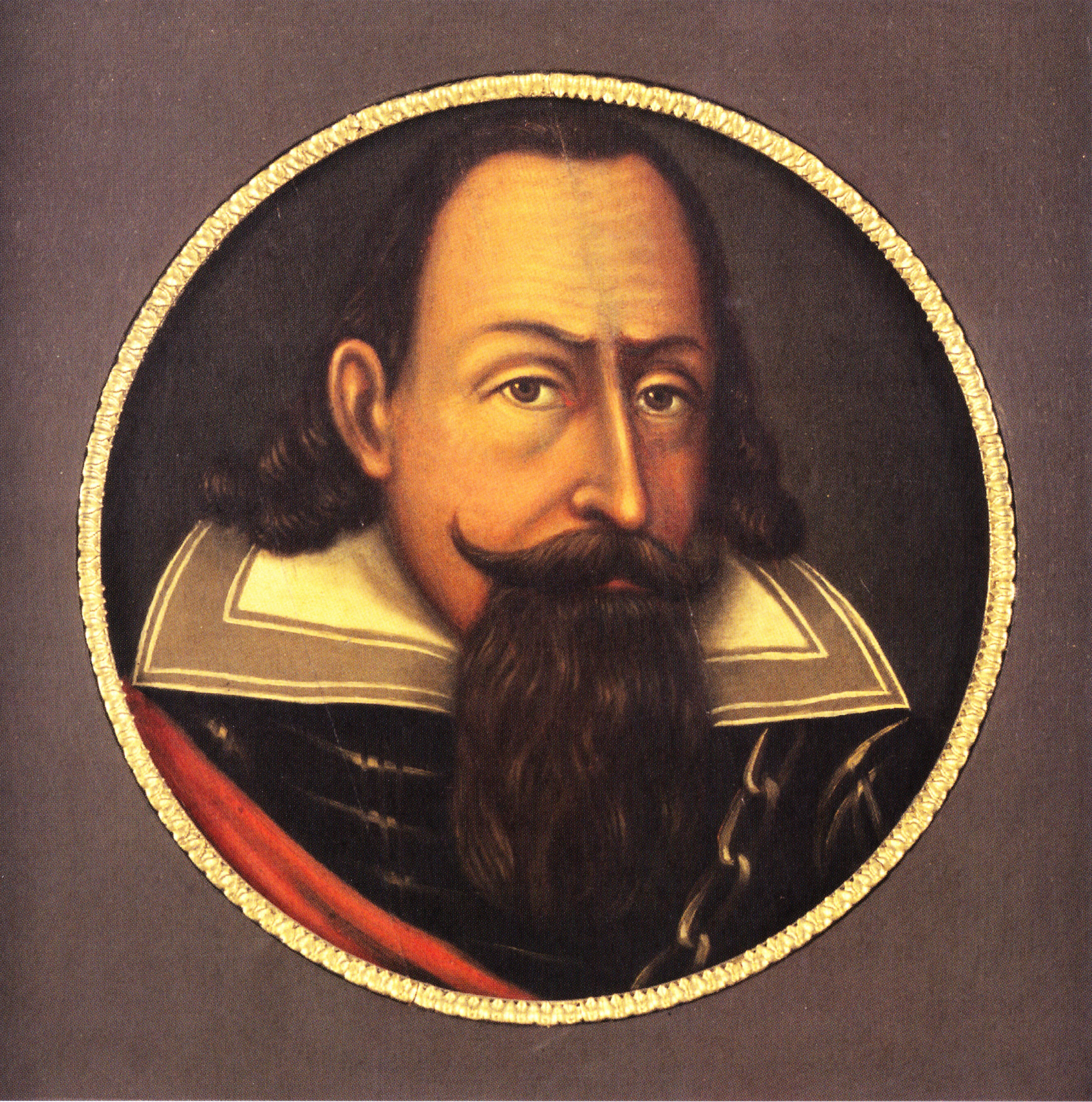
- Duke Philip II of Pomerania-Stettin
- Born: 29 July 1573; Franzburg
- Died: 3 February 1618 (aged 44)
- Noble family: House of Griffin
- Spouse: Sophia of Schleswig-Holstein-Sonderburg
- Father: Bogislaw XIII, Duke of Pomerania
- Mother: Clara of Brunswick

Philip II, Duke of Pomerania-Stettin (29 July 1573 – 3 February 1618) was from 1606 to 1618 the reigning duke of Pomerania-Stettin and is considered to be among of the most artistic of the Pomeranian dukes. He married Sophia of Schleswig-Holstein-Sonderburg (1579-1618) in 1607. The marriage remained childless.

== Life ==
Philipp was born on 29 July 1573 in Neuenkamp, which later became Franzburg in Pomerania, as the eldest son of Duke Bogislaw XIII of Pomerania-Barth and his first wife, Clara of Brunswick. He grew up in his father's small residence in Barth. Although he was the second-born son of Duke Philip I of Pomerania-Wolgast, when Philip I's inheritance was divided among the Pomeranian dukes on 1569, waived his rights to a share, in favour of his younger brother Ernest Louis. He had been compensation with an apanage consisting of the district of Barth and the secularized Cistercian monastery at Neuenkamp.

As a child and teenager, Philip received the usual education for a son of a German prince during the late Renaissance era. Soon, however, his artistic and scientific interests grew soon beyond the usual level. Even at the age of twelve, he owned a collection of books and pictures. He wrote his first scientific papers at the age of 17. His art was not just an expression of his royal representation, but emerged from an inner need. At age 18, he wrote: It is may pleasure to collect good, selected books, portraits from a master's hand, and ancient coins of all kinds. From these I learn how to improve myself and also how I can be beneficial to the general public.

According to the customs of his time he undertook numerous grand tours, which led him to many European countries and the local courts. The two-year stay in Italy at the end of his final grand tour, was cut short in 1598 when his mother fell seriously ill.

Five years later, government business caught up with him. In 1603, Duke Barnim X had died and Philip's father, Bogislaw XIII, became the ruling duke in the Teilherzogtum of Pomerania-Stettin. Apparently, Bogislaw XIII felt he was too old to actually govern, so he appointed his son Philip II as governor of Pomerania-Stettin. When Bogislaw XIII died in 1606, Philip became the ruling duke in Stettin in his own right. Characteristic elements of his reign were his patronage of the arts (described in more detail below), but also his rural regulations of 1616, in which a legal basis for serfdom was created.

On 10 March 1607 he married Sophia (1579–1658, in Treptow an der Rega, her dower), daughter of John II, Duke of Schleswig-Holstein-Sonderburg and his first wife Elisabeth of Brunswick-Grubenhagen. The marriage was, however, childless, like all the marriages in the last generation of the Dukes of Pomerania, so after the death of Philip's brother Bogislaw XIV, the House of Griffins died out in the male line.

Philip's special penchant for melancholy became apparent early on and was certainly reinforced by his sickly constitution. From the first decade of the 17th century, he suffered from gout. This made life more difficult, and he withdrew more and more from public life. It prevented him from attending in person the wedding of his brother Francis with Sophia of Saxony in Dresden in 1610, and the investiture of Emperor Matthias at the Diet of Regensburg in 1613. In 1612, he visited a recently discovered health spa in Lüneburg, but it brought him no relief from his suffering. He died on 3 February [O.S. 13 February] 1618, before the age of 50, like most male members of the last generation of the House of Griffins.

== Funding the arts ==
The most important works of art commissioned by Philip II date from the period 1606–1618. They include:

- the epitaph on the tomb of his ancestor Duke Barnim VI in the church of Kenz-Küstrow in the district of Barth
- the so-called signting book, with numerous portraits of members of the House of Griffins
- an art gallery
- the Map of Lubinus, the first accurate map of the Duchy of Pomerania
- the Meier Court
- the highlight was the Pomeranian art cabinet, which was destroyed by fire during the Second World War

The art dealer Philip Hainhofer from Augsburg was responsible for the procurement of many works of art. Philip corresponded extensively with him. During Hainhofer's visit to Pomerania in 1617, he kept a diary. This diary contains a detailed description of the art collection at the Ducal Castle in Szczecin.

When Philip died in 1618, many of the works he had commissioned had not been completed. His brother and successor, Duke Francis, showed little inclination to continue his deceased brother's artistic ambitions. He paid for the completion of works commissioned by his brother, but after that the era of art at the court of the Pomeranian Dukes came to an end. Among the works completed under Francis was a new wing of the Ducal Castle on the west side of Mint Square. Most works of art were housed in this new wing.

== Ancestors ==
Ancestors of Philip II of Pomerania

16. Bogislaw X, Duke of Pomerania
8. George I, Duke of Pomerania
17. Anna Jagiellonica
4. Philip I, Duke of Pomerania
18. Philip, Elector Palatine
9. Amalie of the Palatinate
19. Margaret of Bavaria
2. Bogislaw XIII, Duke of Pomerania
20. Ernest, Elector of Saxony (= 26)
10. John, Elector of Saxony
21. Elisabeth of Bavaria (= 27)
5. Maria of Saxony
22. Waldemar VI, Prince of Anhalt-Köthen
11. Margaret of Anhalt-Köthen
23. Margarethe of Schwarzburg-Blankenburg
1. Philip II, Duke of Pomerania
24. Otto V, Duke of Brunswick-Lüneburg
12. Henry I of Lüneburg
25. Anne of Nassau-Siegen
6. Francis, Duke of Brunswick-Lüneburg
26. Ernest, Elector of Saxony (= 20)
13. Margarete of Saxony
27. Elisabeth of Bavaria (= 21)
3. Clara of Brunswick-Lüneburg
28. John V, Duke of Saxe-Lauenburg
14. Magnus I, Duke of Saxe-Lauenburg
29. Dorothea of Brandenburg
7. Clara of Saxe-Lauenburg
30. Henry IV, Duke of Brunswick-Lüneburg
15. Catherine of Brunswick-Wolfenbüttel
31. Catherine of Pomerania

== References and sources ==
- Friedrich Ludwig v. Medem (ed.): Philipp Hainhofers Reise-Tagebuch, enthaltend Schilderungen aus Francken, Sachsen, der Mark Brandenburg und Pommern im Jahr 1617, in: Baltische Studien, vol. 2 issue 2, 1834, pp. I-XXXII and 1–180.
- Theodor Pyl (1888). "Philipp II., Herzog von Pommern-Stettin" . Allgemeine Deutsche Biographie (in German). Vol. 26. Leipzig: Duncker & Humblot. pp. 34–36.
- Oscar Doering: Des Augsburger Patriciers Philipp Hainhofer Beziehungen zum Herzog Philipp II. von Pommern-Stettin. Correspondenzen aus den Jahren 1610-1619 im Auszuge mitgetheilt und commentiert, in: Quellenschriften für Kunstgeschichte und Kunsttechnik des Mittelalters und der Neuzeit, vol. 6, Vienna, 1894.
- Hellmuth Bethe: Die Kunst am Hofe der pommerschen Herzöge, Berlin, 1937.
- Dirk Schleinert: Das Stammbuch Herzog Philipps II. von Pommern, in: Findbücher, Inventare und kleine Schriften des Landeshauptarchivs Schwerin, vol. 10, Schwerin, 2004, ISBN 3-9805560-9-3.
- Barbara Mundt: Herzog Philipp II. als Kunstsammler und sein Agent Philipp Hainhofer, in: Pommern. Zeitschrift für Kultur und Geschichte, issue 3/2009, ISSN 0032-4167, pp. 38–44.

Philip II of Pomerania House of Griffins Born: 29 July 1573 Died: 3 February 1618
Preceded by Bogislaw XIII	Duke of Pomerania-Stettin; 1606–1618	Succeeded by Francis
