= Francis, Duke of Pomerania =

Duke of Pomerania-Stettin, Bishop of Cammin

Francis
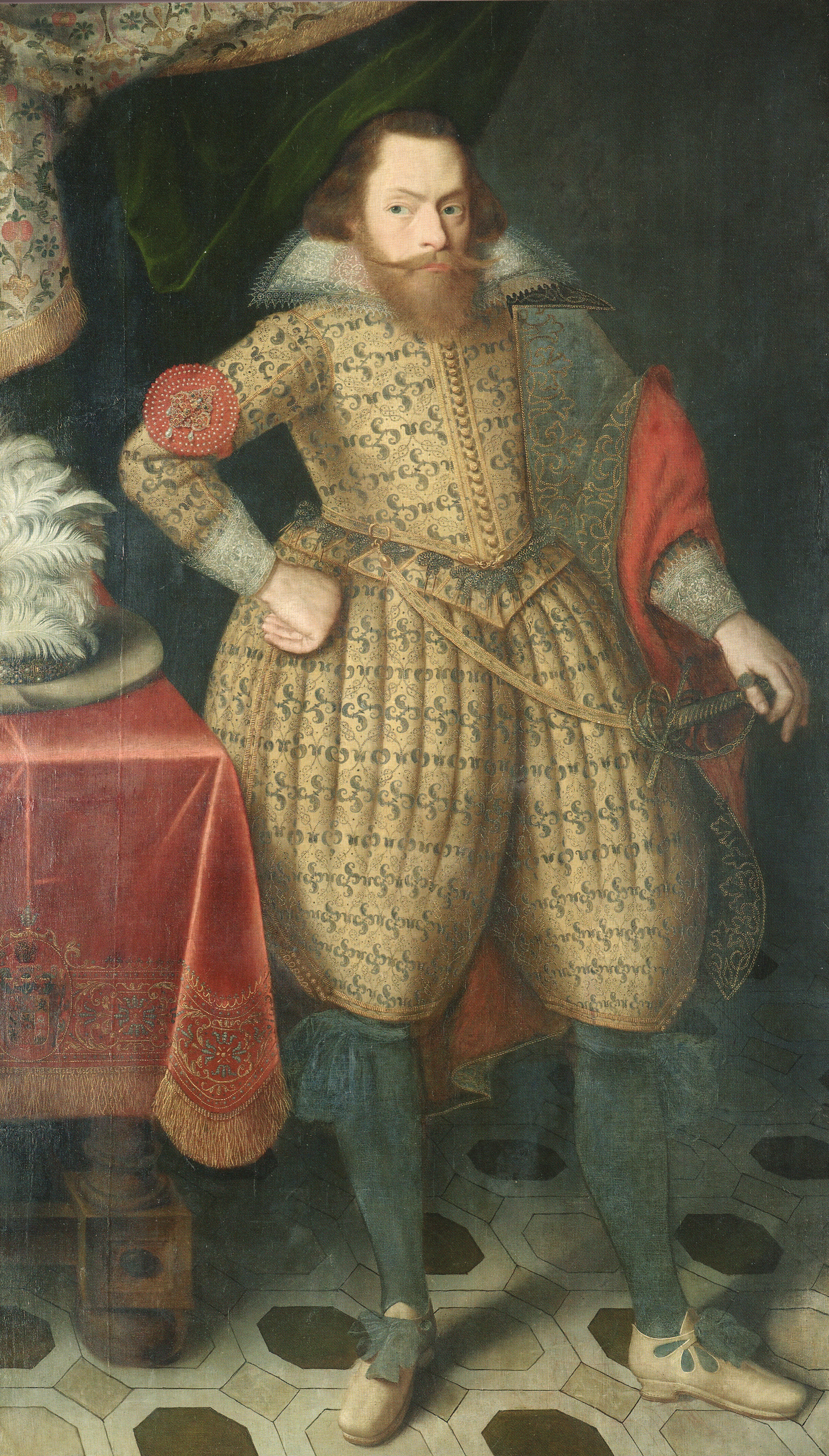

Duke of Pomerania-Barth
- Reign: 7 March 1606 – 27 November 1620
- Predecessor: Bogislaw XIII
- Successor: Bogislaw XIV

Duke of Pomerania-Stettin
- Reign: 3 February 1618 – 27 November 1620
- Predecessor: Philip II
- Successor: Bogislaw XIV
- Born: 24 March 1577; Barth
- Died: 27 November 1620 (aged 43); Stettin
- Spouse: Sophie of Saxony
Names
- German: Franz von Pommern; Polish: Franciszek szczeciński
- House: House of Griffin
- Father: Bogislaw XIII, Duke of Pomerania
- Mother: Clara of Brunswick-Lüneburg

Francis of Pomerania (in the older literature sometimes referred to as Francis I of Pomerania; German: Franz von Pommern; 24 March 1577, in Barth – 27 November 1620, in Stettin (Szczecin)) was Duke of Pomerania-Stettin and Bishop of Cammin.

== Life ==
Francis was the son of Duke Bogislaw XIII and his wife, Clara of Brunswick-Lüneburg. At the instigation of his father, he received the best possible education. He indicated at an early age that his interests tended towards knighthood and military affairs. His plans to go to the Saxon court, however were thwarted by John Frederick, who brought him into the Bishopric of Cammin, the temporalities of secular princely rule of the bishops. In 1592, he was appointed Coadjutor of the diocese; in 1593, he participated in the national synod. In 1594, he made a trip to Vienna and Hungary. He took part in the siege of Esztergom fortress under Matthias, the later Archduke Matthias of Austria. He went to Italy in 1596 and then returned to Pomerania.

After his uncle Casimir had resigned from his post as Bishop of Cammin in 1602, Francis was elected as the next bishop in a carefully predetermined election. His residence was Köslin (renamed as Koszalin in 1945), where he had the castle equipped accordingly.

When in 1604 the King of Sweden offered him the command of 3000 men infantry and 1000 cavalry in the Polish-Swedish war, he had to refuse, in view of the neutrality of Pomerania.

In 1607, he made another journey. This brought him first to Prague and from there via Switzerland and France to the Spanish border. He returned via England, Scotland and the Netherlands. To secure the borders of his bishopric, he established a small military force in 1614. After his brother Philip II had died without heirs in 1618, Francis succeeded him as ruler of Pomerania-Stettin. The Bishopric of Cammin went to his brother Ulrich.

His efforts to strengthen the defensive capabilities of Pomerania were largely unsuccessful, due to the resistance of the Estates. They rejected his demand to provide the Stettin arsenal with weapons and equipment, and also refused the inspection announced at Pützerlin in November 1619.

He did not share the scientific interests of his predecessor Philip II. Projects on geography or national history such as Valentin von Winther's Pomeranographia, found little support with Francis. He devoted himself intensively to the affairs of government and the city of Stettin. Documents requiring his signature were always checked thoroughly. Because of his kindness and affability in dealing with his subjects, he was very popular among the population.

During Duke Francis's time in office, the 80-year-old nun Sidonia von Borcke from the Marienfließ Convent was tried for witchcraft. She was accused of having caused the early death of the Dukes Philip II and George II, and of causing the other sons of Duke Bogislaw XIII to remain childless. She was found guilty, and executed. Three months later, Duke Francis fell ill. He was still healthy in the morning, felt ill after lunch, and died a few days later.

In 1610, Duke Francis was married to Sophie of Saxony, a daughter of Elector Christian I of Saxony. The marriage remained childless.

== References and sources ==
- Ute Essegern: Zur Werbung ich itzo mich gentzlich entschloßen. Die Eheschließung zwischen Herzog Franz von Pommern-Stettin (1577-1620) und Sophia von Sachsen (1587-1635), in: Pommern. Zeitschrift für Kultur und Geschichte vol. 43 issue 1, 2005, p. 27-35.
- Herrmann Müller (1877). "Franz I." . Allgemeine Deutsche Biographie (in German). Vol. 7. Leipzig: Duncker & Humblot. pp. 292–293.

Francis, Duke of Pomerania House of Griffins Born: 24 March 1577 Died: 27 November 1620
Preceded by Casimir VI	Administrator of Cammin; 1602–1618	Succeeded by Ulrich
Preceded by Bogislaw XIII	Duke of Pomerania-Barth; 1606–1620	Succeeded by Bogislaw XIV
Preceded by Philip II	Duke of Pomerania-Stettin; 1618–1620	Succeeded by Bogislaw XIV
