= Charles Philippe de Croÿ =

Flemish soldier, politician, and nobleman (1549–1613)

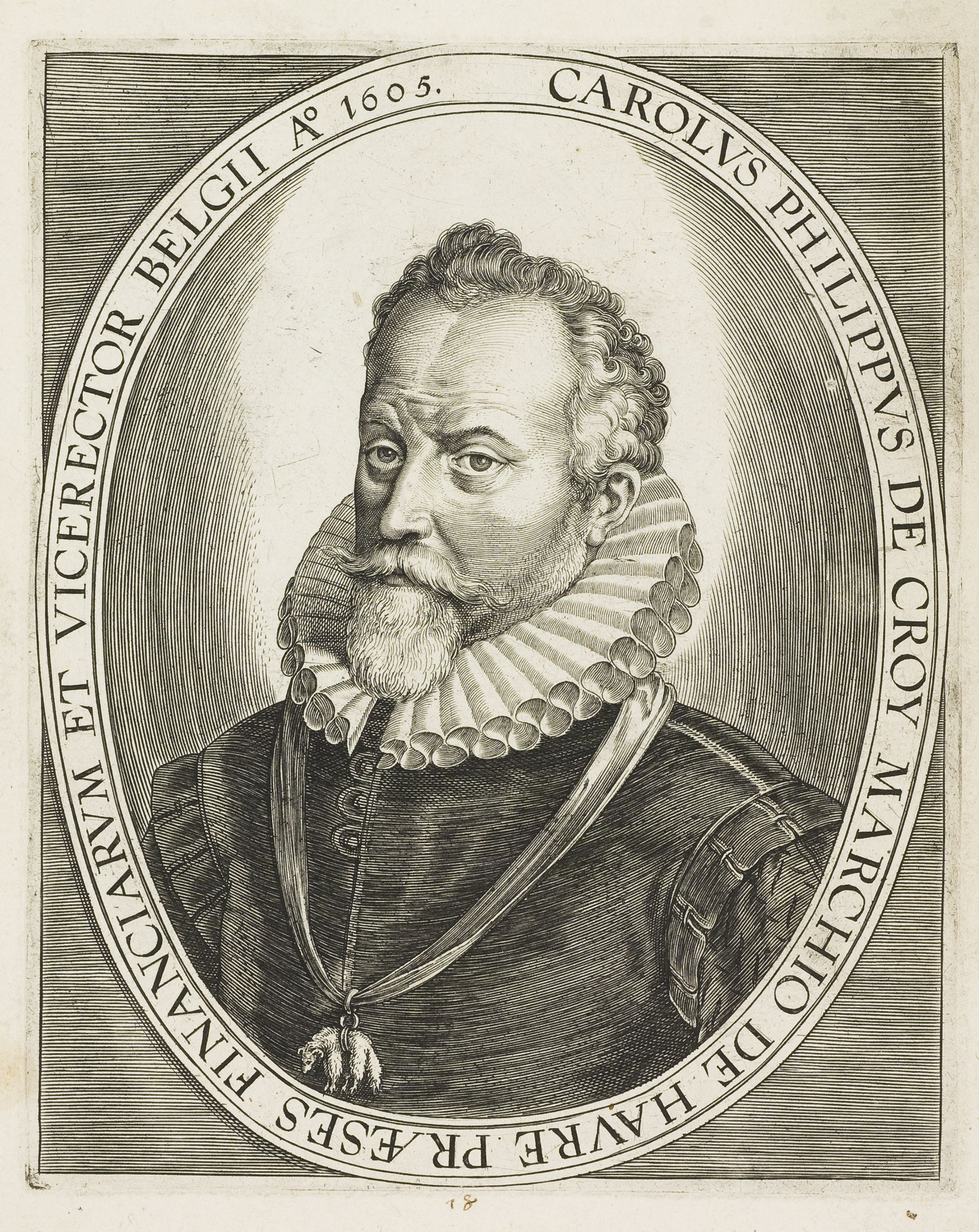
Engraving of Charles Philippe de Croÿ (1605)

Arms of Charles Philippe of Croÿ

Charles Philippe of Croÿ (1 September 1549 – 23 November 1613 in Burgundy), Marquis of Havré, was a soldier and politician from the Spanish Netherlands.

== Life ==
He was the son of Philippe II de Croÿ and his second wife Anna of Lorraine. His godfathers were King Charles V and his son, the future King Philip II of Spain.

He fought under the Duke of Alba against William the Silent in 1568 and one year later under King Charles IX of France against the Huguenots. He was seriously wounded in the Battle of Moncontour and was treated in the castle of Havré by Ambroise Paré. Charles Philippe was a confidant of King Philip II and became a member of the Council of State in the Low Countries. In 1576, he tried vainly to stop the Sack of Antwerp. In 1577, he defected to the Union of Brussels and was awarded the post of Ambassador in England by the rebels.

In 1579, he was on a mission in Artois with Adolf van Meetkercke when he defected back to the camp of King Philip II. He was pardoned but remained inactive for the next 8 years. In 1587, he was sent on a military expedition to help his cousin Charles III, Duke of Lorraine. He became a member of the Council of State again and was a loyal supporter of the Absolutist policy of the King.

In 1594, he was sent by Archduke Ernest of Austria to the Imperial Diet at Regensburg as representative of the Burgundian Circle. He became Prince of the Holy Empire.
In 1599, he became a Knight in the Order of the Golden Fleece.

== Family ==
Charles Philippe, in 1570, married Diane de Dommartin (1552–1625). Their offspring were:

- Charles Alexandre de Croÿ, Marquis of Havré (1574–1624)
- Dorothea of Croÿ (1575–1662), married her cousin Charles III de Croÿ
- Ernst of Croÿ (1583–1620), married Anna of Pomerania in 1619, father of Ernst Bogislaw von Croÿ.
- Christina of Croÿ (1591–1664), married Philipp Otto of Salm-Salm, killed in the Battle of Nördlingen (1634).

== Sources ==
- Israel, Jonathan I. (1997). Conflicts of Empires: Spain, the Low Countries and the Struggle for World, 1585-1713. The Hambledon Press.
