= Franz Schuselka =

Austrian politician and writer (1811–1886)

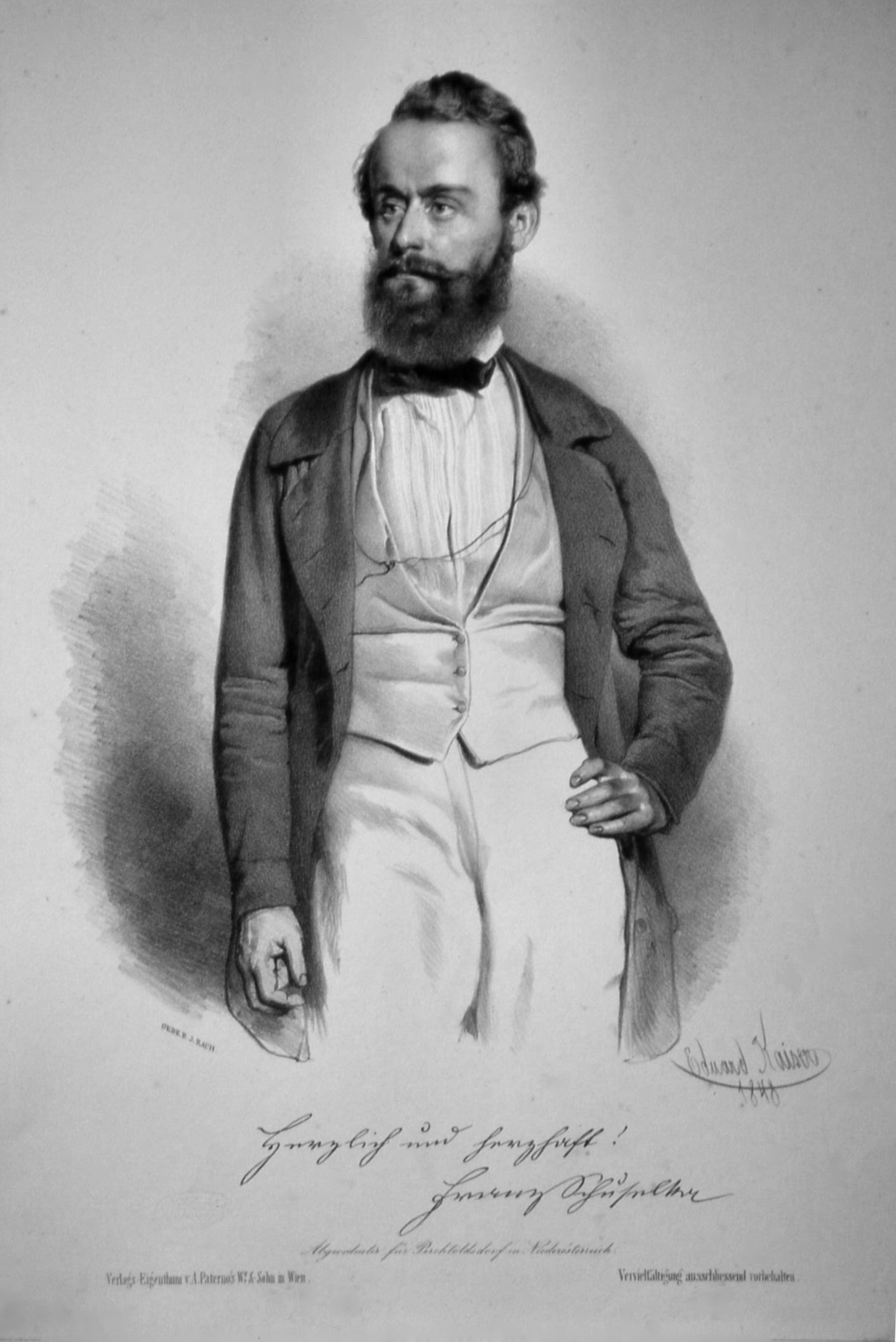
Franz Schuselka, lithograph by Eduard Kaiser 1848

Franz Schuselka (15 August 1811 – 1 September 1886) was an Austrian politician and writer.

== Biography ==
Schuselka was born on 15 August 1811 in České Budějovice. His father was an artillery corporal. He studied law at the University of Vienna, then served an internship in the criminal courts. After that, he was a tutor for several noble families in Vienna, Salzburg and Prague. In 1839, he decided to change careers and became a journalist. Three years later, he left Austria for Germany; living first in Weimar, then Jena. He was forced to return to Austria when his political writings came under investigation and his passport was not renewed.

In 1845, he returned to Jena and joined the German Catholic sect, which made him unwelcome in Austria. In 1846, he moved to Hamburg where, a year later, he became a member of the Freemasons lodge known as "To Brotherhood on the Elbe". In 1848, during the Revolutions, he went back to Vienna, was elected to the Vorlparlament, and was one of the six Austrians elected to the revolutionary Fifties Committee.

Finally, he was elected to the Frankfurt Parliament, representing Klosterneuburg in the left-wing Donnersberg Faction. He resigned before the end of the year, however, having already been elected to the Imperial Diet. His most important role came during the Vienna Uprising, when he headed the Security committee. After the city surrendered, he moved to Kremsier, where he was an opposition leader in the Diet. The Diet was dissolved in 1849, and he made a leisurely journey through Germany on his way back to Vienna. During that time, he married Ida Wohlbrück (1817–1903), daughter of Gustav Friedrich Wohlbrück, a court actor in Weimar, who had recently died. When they made it back, in 1850, he found himself expelled to his estate in Gainfarn, where they lived in seclusion for two years before being allowed to re-enter.

Later, he spent a few years in Dresden, while Ida was helping to direct the Linz State Theatre, and had an intermittent correspondence with the conservative Baron Alexander von Bach. When he once again returned to Vienna, he took a more centrist position and, in 1859, became one of the founding members and first Chairman of the Presseclub Concordia, an organization devoted to helping journalists in need. When the post-revolutionary oppression ended, he was elected to the Landtag of Lower Austria and served until 1865. He also began a reconciliation with the mainstream Catholic Church. From 1862 to 1879, he edited the weekly political magazine, Die Reform. In 1879, he had a stroke that prevented him from working.

He spent his final years at Heiligenkreuz Abbey in the Vienna Woods, where he died on 1 September 1886.
