= Gustav Friedrich Wohlbrück =

German actor and theatre director

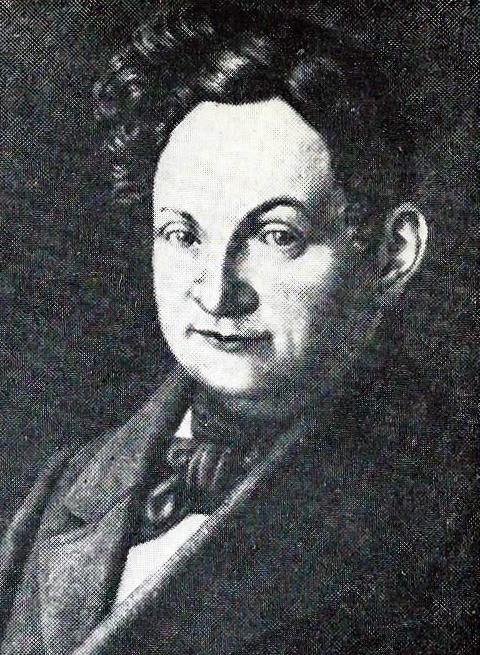
Gustav Friedrich Wohlbrück (1840s)

Gustav Friedrich Wohlbrück (27 September 1793, in Barth – 7 March 1849, in Weimar) was a German actor and theatre director.

== Biography ==
His father, Johann Gottfried Wohlbrück (1770-1822), was also an actor. He first performed on stage at the age of nineteen against his father's wishes. His initial attempts to play romantic leads was unsuccessful, so he turned to playing character parts. His first major engagement was at Danzig, where he stayed for several years. After that, he was engaged in Bremen, Königsberg, and various places in Austria.

He went to St. Petersburg in 1829; unfortunately, not long after his arrival, his wife, whom he had to leave in Königsberg, died suddenly. The following year, he was remarried, to Eleonore Dorothea Friederike Heß, the daughter of a teacher, and settled in St. Petersburg, where he worked for the Imperial Theatres. In 1840, he returned to Königsberg, where he had been hired by Anton Hübsch, the Director of the Stadttheater. When Hübsch resigned in 1842, Wöhlbruck applied for his job, but the writer Friedrich Tietz (1803-1879), was chosen instead. Wöhlbruck was, however, able to obtain a prominent position at the Grand Ducal Theatre in Weimar (now the Deutsches Nationaltheater und Staatskapelle Weimar).

In 1847, he fell ill with stomach cancer and died from it two years later.

Among his best known roles were "Franz Moor", in The Robbers, and "Wurm", in Intrigue and Love; both plays by Friedrich Schiller.

His brother, Wilhelm August, was also an actor, as well as a librettist. Of the four children he had with his first wife, the eldest, Ida (1817-1903), was the only one to enter the acting profession. She was also married twice; first to the actor, Karl Brüning, whom she divorced after only a year, then to the journalist and politician, Franz Schuselka.
