= Bogislaw XIV of Pomerania =

Bogislaw XIV
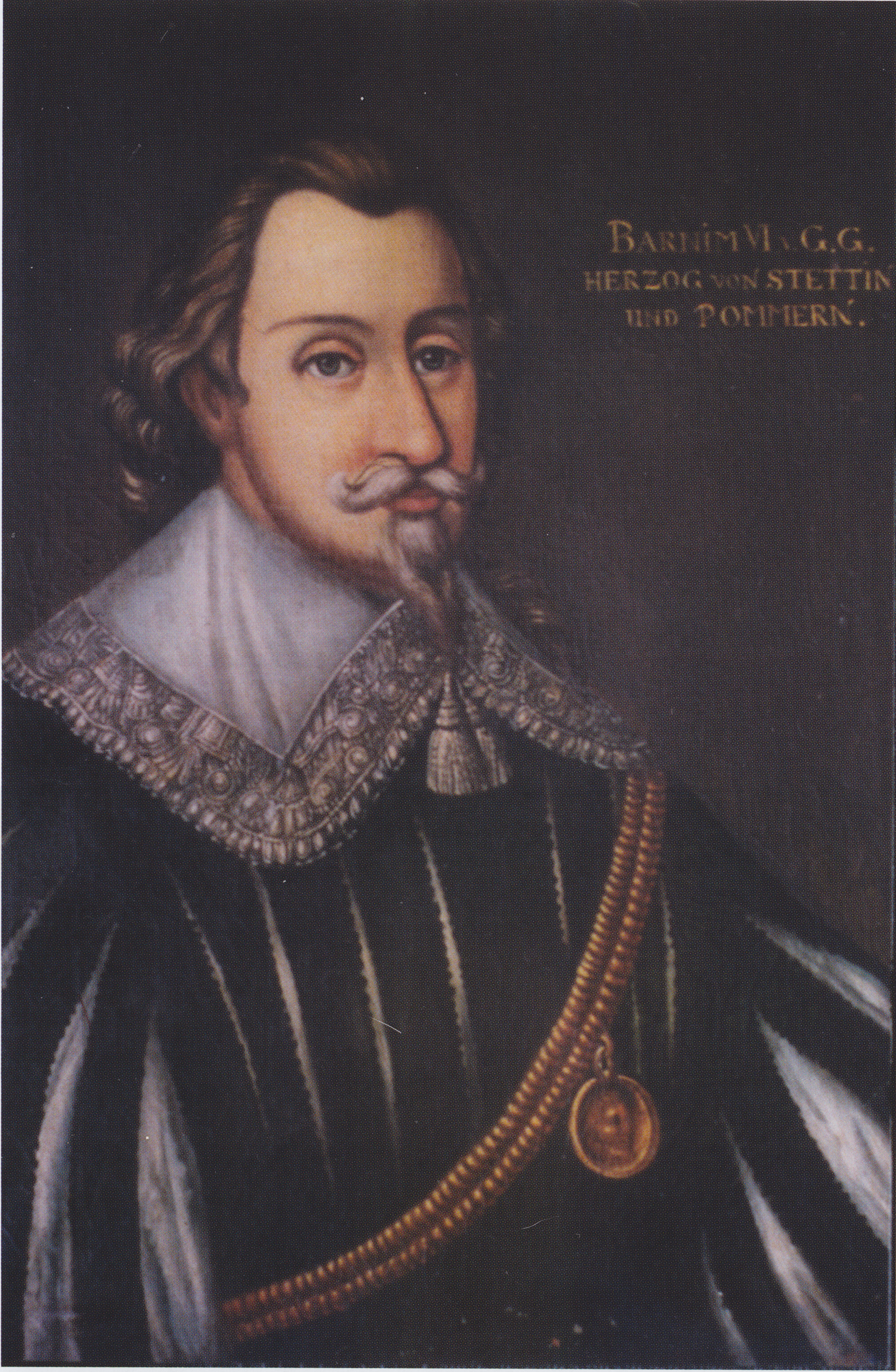
- Portrait of Bogislaw (ca 1635)

Duke of Pomerania
- Reign: 6 February 1625 – 10 March 1637
- Predecessor: Barnim IX
- Successor: Christina (as personal union)
- Born: 31 March 1580; Barth
- Died: 10 March 1637 (aged 56); Stettin
- Spouse: Elisabeth of Schleswig-Holstein-Sonderburg
- House: House of Griffin
- Father: Bogislaw XIII, Duke of Pomerania
- Mother: Clara of Brunswick-Lüneburg

Bogislaw XIV (31 March 1580 – 10 March 1637) was the last Duke of Pomerania. He was also the Lutheran administrator of the Prince-Bishopric of Cammin.

== Biography ==
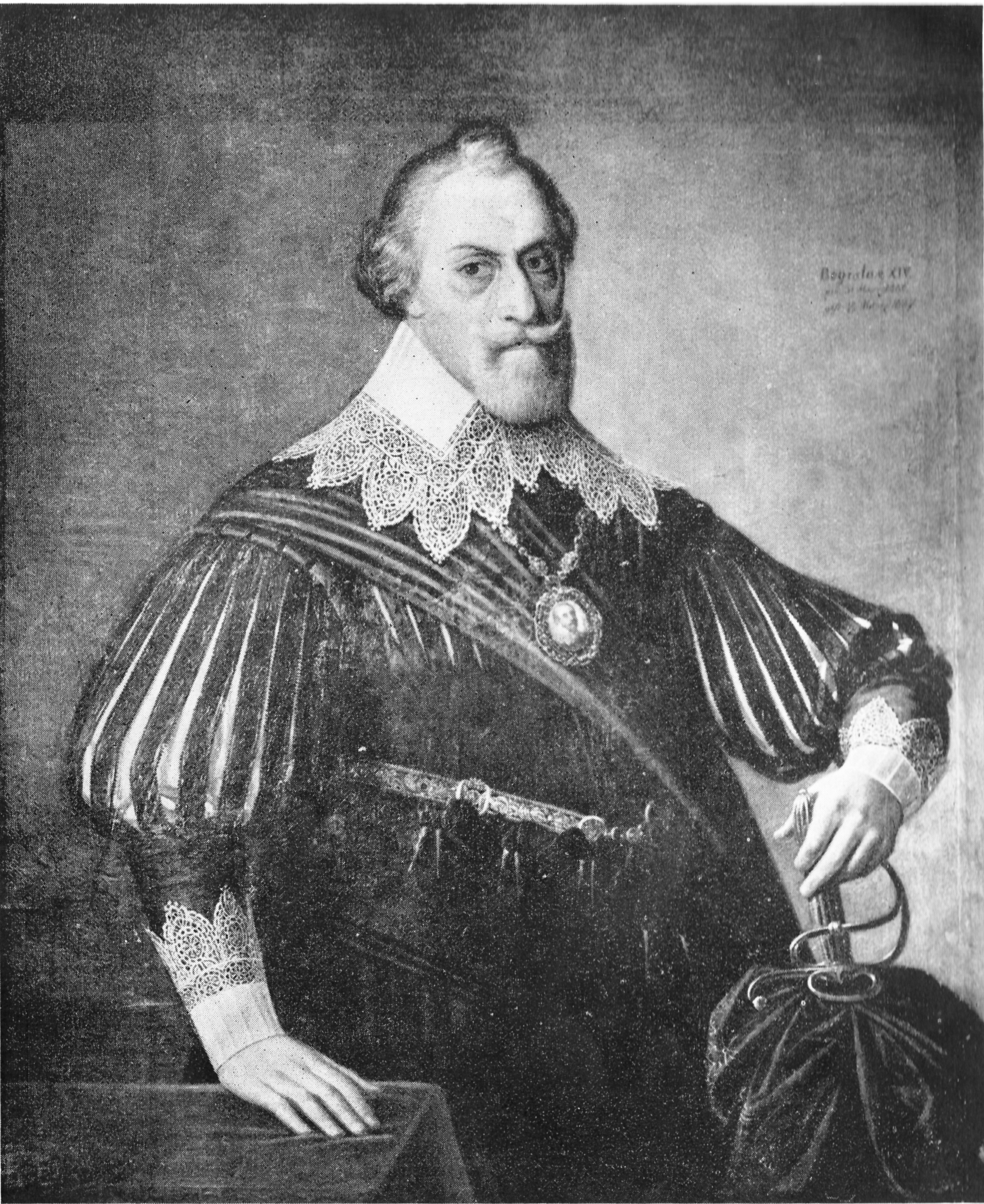
Portrait of Bogislaw XIV, 1632

Bogislaw was born in Barth as a member of the House of Griffin. He was the third son of Duke Bogislaw XIII by his first wife Clara of Brunswick-Lüneburg. On the death of his father in 1606, he and his younger brother George II became joint dukes of Rügenwalde (Darłowo). George II died in 1617, and Bogislaw became sole ruler. In 1620 his domain was incorporated into the Duchy of Stettin, which he inherited on the death of his elder brother Francis. Early in 1625 he became ruler of all West Pomerania on the death of the last Duke of Wolgast, Philipp Julius, and on 19 February he was married to Elisabeth (24 September 1580 – 21 December 1653), fifth daughter of John II, Duke of Schleswig-Holstein-Sonderburg, by his first wife, Elisabeth of Brunswick-Grubenhagen.

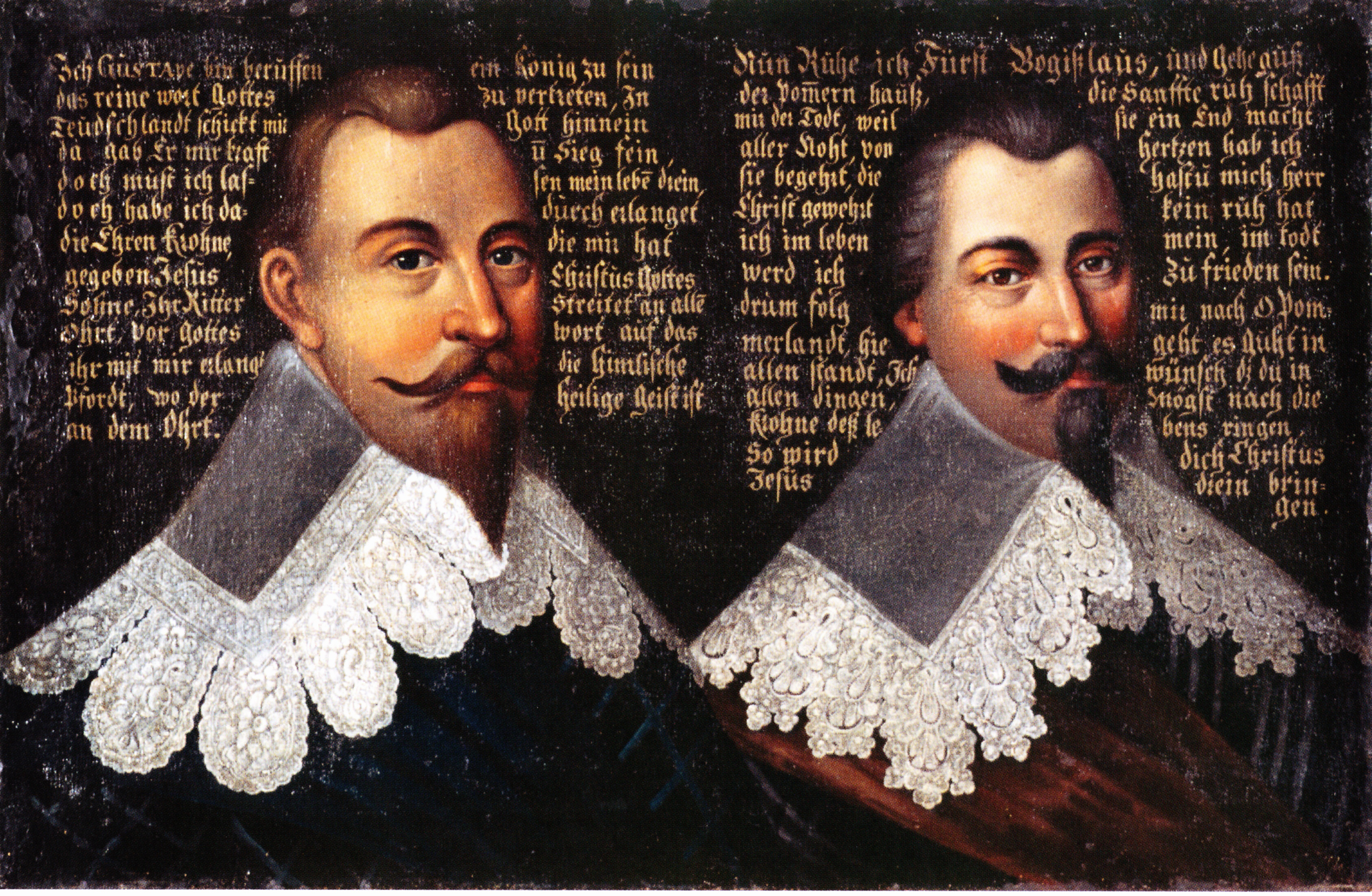
Portrait of Gustavus Adolphus (left) and Bogislaw XIV (right)

Despite his attempts to avoid becoming embroiled in the Thirty Years' War, Bogislaw in the Capitulation of Franzburg was forced to allow imperial troops commanded by Albrecht von Wallenstein to use his territories as a base in 1627. In turn, his lands became embroiled in the war, with all its disastrous consequences. In the 1630s, many of the local nobility tried to lessen his power, and this problem occupied Bogislaw in the early 1630s, causing a stroke which left him partially paralyzed. In 1634 he abdicated without clear succession resulting in a constitutional power struggle between his relatives and the governing council. With the constitutional issues unresolved, no recognized male issue, and virtually all of Pomerania occupied by Swedish and imperial troops, Bogislaw died in 1637. The conflicts and issues surrounding the personal and constitutional succession and general future of Pomerania as a dukedom were of such gravity and complexity that the burial of Bogislaw's body was postponed for almost 20 years.

The succession to his lands was disputed between George William, Elector of Brandenburg, the heir under a pact between the two families in 1464, and his brother-in-law King Gustavus Adolphus of Sweden, who had occupied much of Pomerania on entering the Thirty Years' War in 1629. According to Bogislaw' last will, in case of no succession with the House of Pomerania, his lands were to pass to Sweden, not to Brandenburg–Prussia. Both Sweden and Brandenburg, exploited not only their position as superior military and occupying powers but also the succession conflicts within the House of Pomerania itself. When the Peace of Westphalia concluded the war in 1648, Pomerania was split between Sweden and Brandenburg. This marked the end of Pomerania as an autonomous political entity.

On 25 May 1654, almost seven years after Pomerania had lost her independence and only after Bogislaw's wife Elisabeth of Schleswig-Holstein-Sonderburg had died, Bogislaw's body was finally put to rest in Stettin.

Bogislaw XIV of Pomerania House of Griffins Born: 31 March 1580 Died: 10 March 1637
Regnal titles
Preceded by Ulrich	Administrator of Cammin; 1623–1637	Succeeded by Ernst Bogislaw von Croy
Preceded by George II	Duke of Pomerania-Rügenwalde; 1617–1637	Duchy of Pomerania dissolved
Preceded by Francis	Duke of Pomerania-Stettin; 1620–1637	Duchy of Pomerania dissolved
Preceded by Philip Julius	Duke of Pomerania-Wolgast; 1625–1637	Duchy of Pomerania dissolved
