= Bukowo Morskie =

- Village
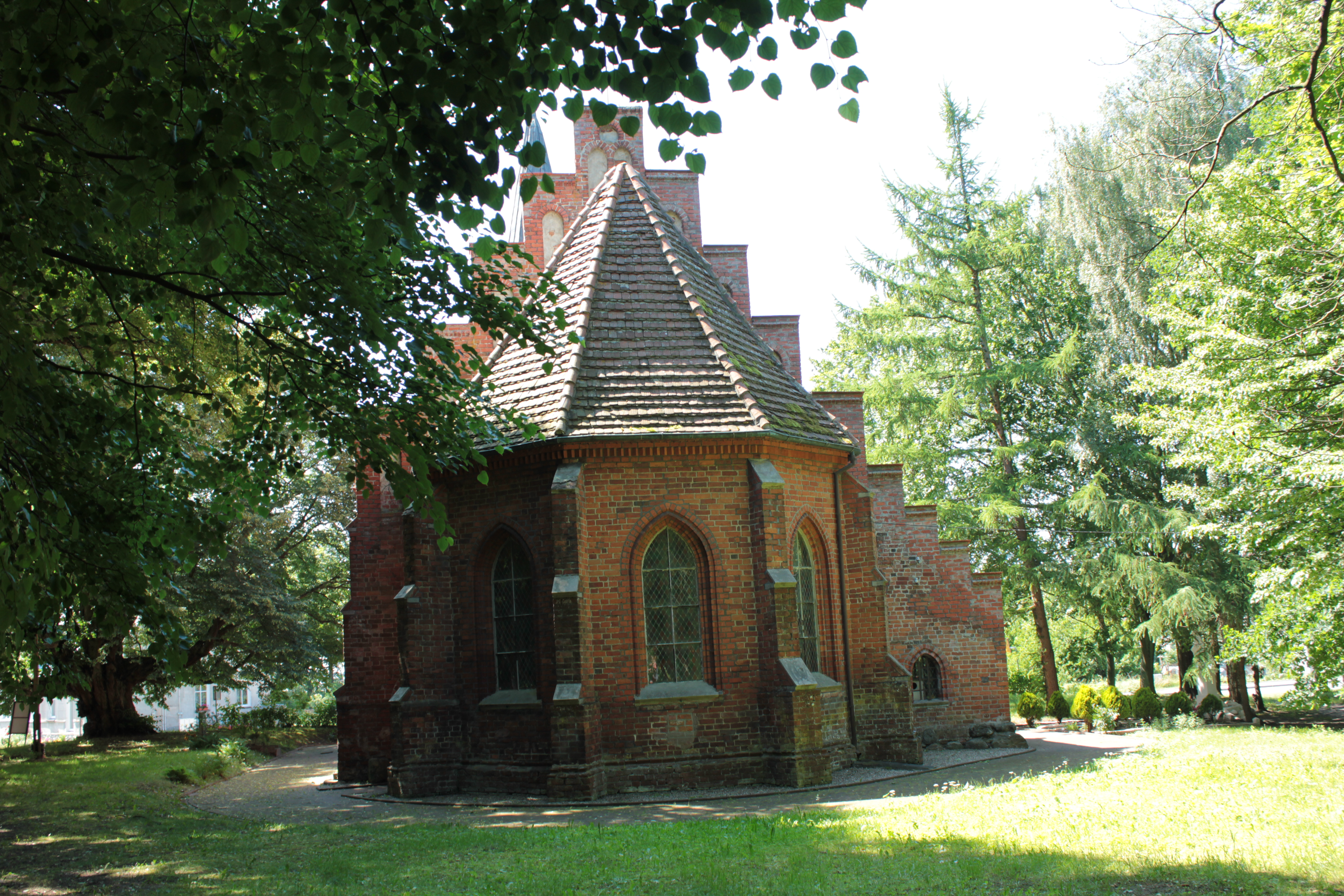
- Church of Sacred Heart

- Location within Poland
- Coordinates: 54°21′19″N 16°20′4″E
- Country: Poland
- Voivodeship: West Pomeranian
- County: Sławno
- Gmina: Darłowo

Population
  - Total: 425

Bukowo Morskie [buˈkɔvɔ ˈmɔrskʲɛ] (German: Seebuckow) is a village in the administrative district of Gmina Darłowo, within Sławno County, West Pomeranian Voivodeship, in north-western Poland. It lies approximately 9 km (6 mi) south-west of Darłowo, 23 km (14 mi) west of Sławno, and 156 km (97 mi) north-east of the regional capital Szczecin.

The village has a population of 425.
