= Anna of Pomerania =

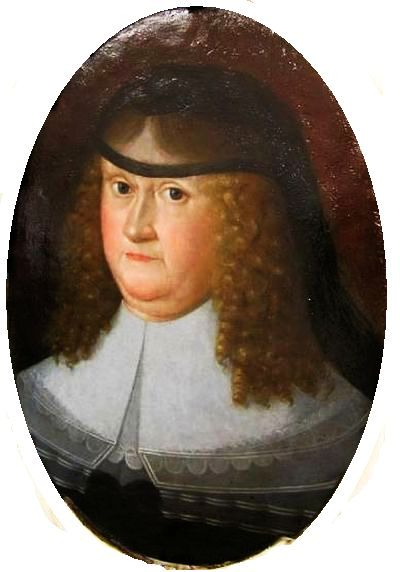
Duchess Anna of Croy-Havré

Anna of Pomerania (also known as Anne de Croy et Aerschot, Anna von Croy und Aerschot, Anna von Pommern) (3 October 1590, Barth - 7 July 1660, Stolp) was Duchess-Consort of Croy and Havré, and allodial heiress of the extinct ruling house of the Duchy of Pomerania.

== Early life and ancestry ==
She was youngest daughter of Bogislaw XIII, Duke of Pomerania and his wife, Princess Klara of Brunswick-Lüneburg. She was the last surviving member of the House of Griffin (Greifen).

== Marriage and issue ==
In 1619 she married Ernst von Croÿ (1588–1620), Prince and Duke of Croÿ (1583–1620), an Imperial general, he would however die the following year. Ernst was the son of Charles Philippe de Croÿ (1549–1613), who was the only son of Philippe II of Croÿ, Duke of Aarschot by his second wife, Princess Anna of Lorraine.

Their only son, Ernst Bogislaw von Croy (1620–1684), became the last Lutheran bishop of Kammin (now Kamień Pomorski).

== See also ==
- House of Croÿ for short biographies of both Ernsts von Croy
