= Bogislaw XIII =

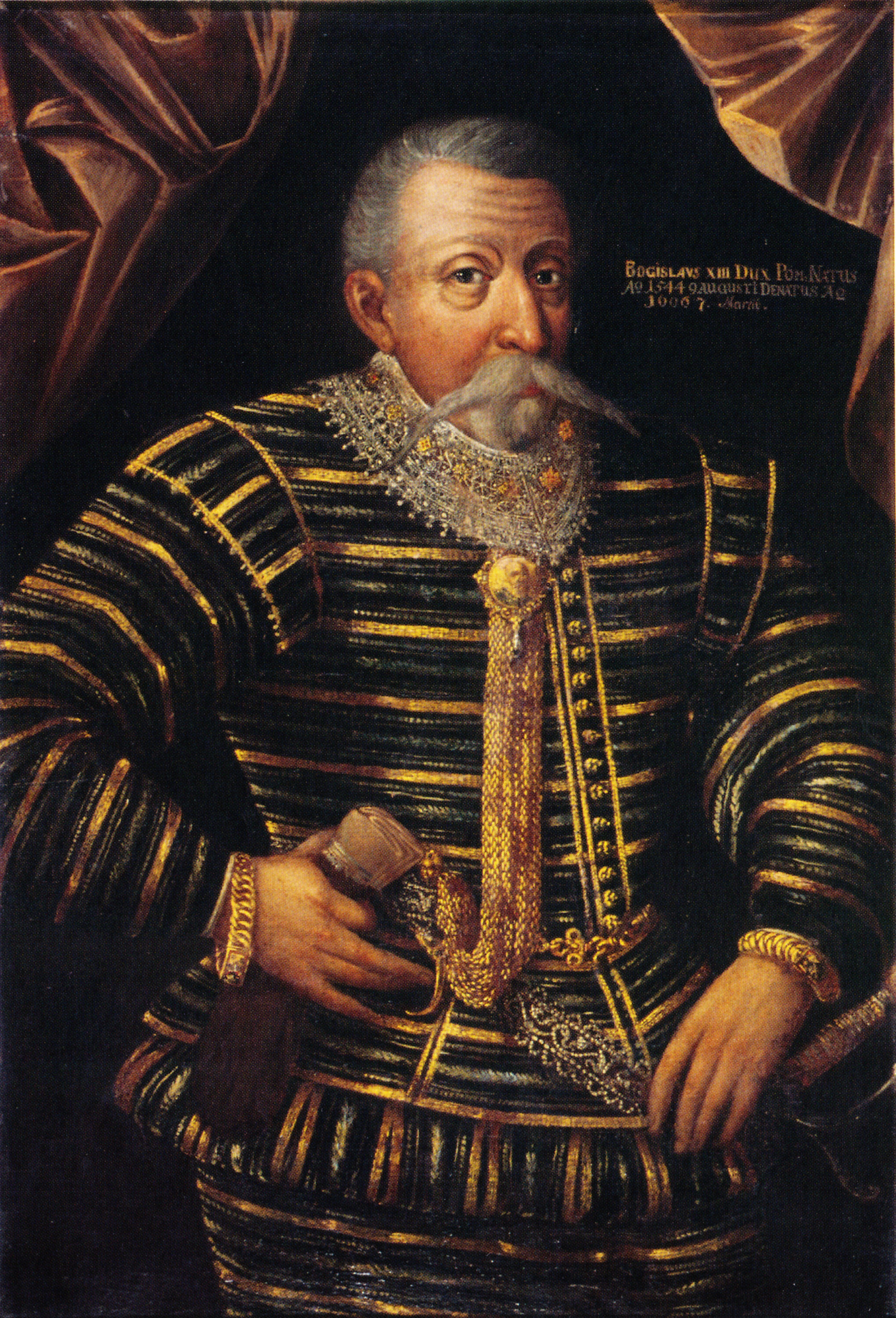
- Anonymous copy of a portrait, c. 1750

Duke of Pomerania-Wolgast
- Reign: 14 February 1560 – 1569
- Predecessor: Philip I
- Successor: Ernst Ludwig

Duke of Pomerania-Barth
- Reign: 1569 – 7 March 1606
- Predecessor: New title
- Successor: Francis

Duke of Pomerania-Rügenwalde
- Reign: 1569 – 7 March 1606
- Predecessor: New title
- Successor: George II; Bogislaw XIV

Duke of Pomerania-Stettin
- Reign: 1 September 1603 – 7 March 1606
- Predecessor: Barnim X
- Successor: Philip II
- Born: 9 August 1544
- Died: 7 March 1606 (aged 61); Stettin
- Spouse: Clara of Brunswick-Lüneburg; Anna of Schleswig-Holstein-Sonderburg
- Issue: Philip II, Duke of Pomerania; Francis, Duke of Pomerania; Bogislaw XIV, Duke of Pomerania; George II, Duke of Pomerania; Ulrich, Duke of Pomerania; Anna de Croy
Names
- German: Bogislaw XIII. von Pommern; Polish: Bogusław XIII pomorski
- House: House of Griffin
- Father: Philip I, Duke of Pomerania
- Mother: Maria of Saxony

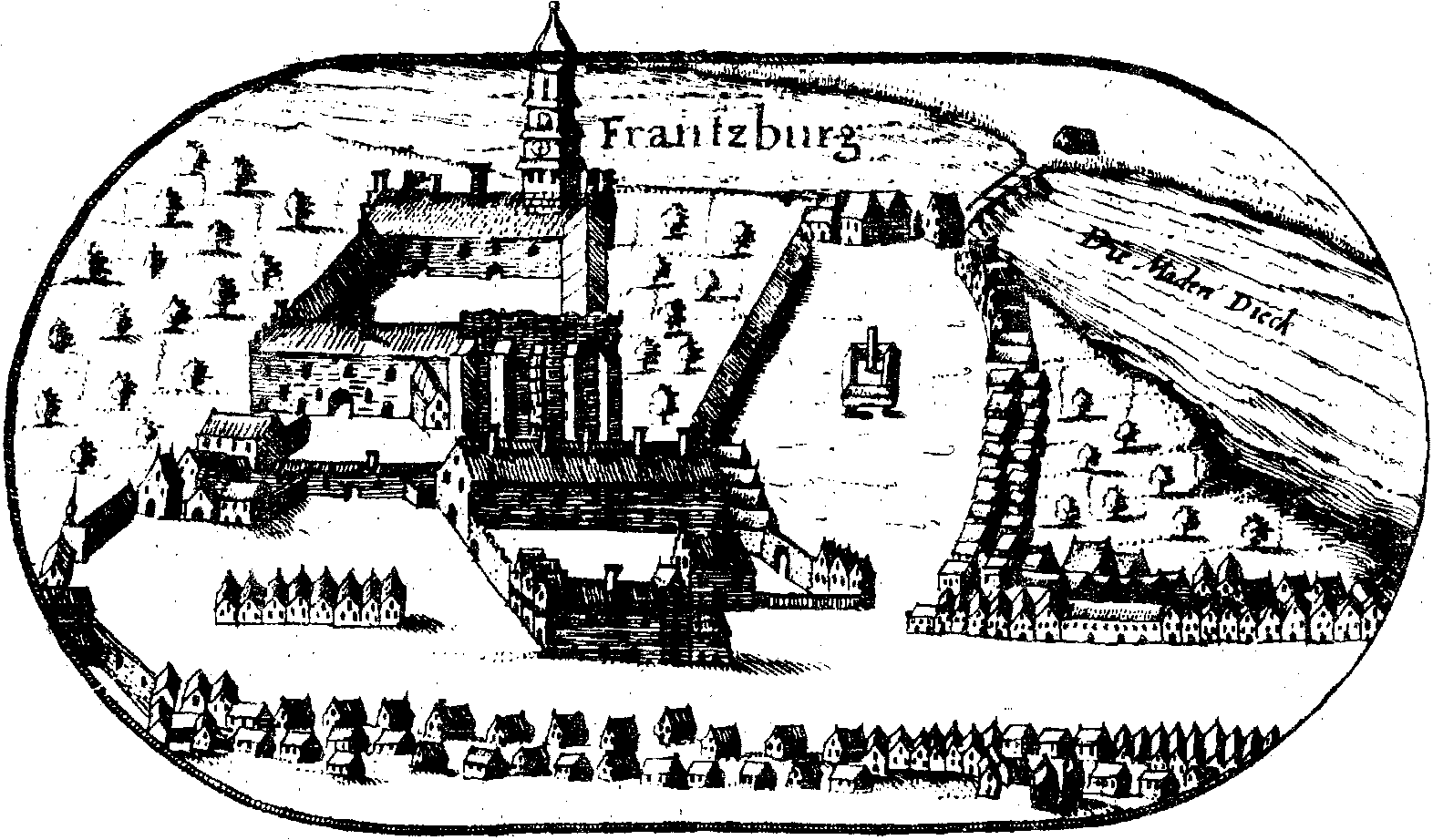
Franzburg in 1618

Bogislaw XIII (Bogusław XIII) of Pomerania (9 August 1544 – 7 March 1606), son of Philip I and Maria of Saxony, was a prince of Stettin and Wolgast, and a member of the Griffins.

Bogislaw studied at the University of Greifswald at the age of 14. At first, he was co-regent with his brother Johann Friedrich of Pomerania-Wolgast, but in 1569 he settled with control over Barth and Neuenkamp. There, he founded a printing house in 1582, publishing in 1588 the "Barth Bible", a bible in the Low German language, as translated by Johannes Bugenhagen. In 1587 he founded Franzburg to compete with Stralsund.

From 1603 until his death, he ruled in Pomerania-Stettin, which he inherited under the Inheritance Treat of Jasenitz of 1509 in case his two brothers John Frederick (d. 1600) and Barnim X (d. 1603) would both die childless. He kept his residence in Barth, and his eldest son, Philip II, acted as governor in Stettin.

He is remembered as a wise ruler, knowledgeable in the areas of economics and governance.

== Marriages and issue ==
He married twice: first to Clara of Brunswick-Lüneburg, daughter of Francis, Duke of Brunswick-Lüneburg. They had the following children:

- Philip II (1573–1618)
- Clara Maria (1574–1623)
- Francis (1577–1620)
- Bogislaw XIV (1580–1637), the last ruling duke of Pomerania
- George II (1582–1617)
- Ulrich (1589–1622)
- Anna (1590–1660), married Ernst von Croÿ

Clara died in 1598. On 31 May 1601, he married Anna of Schleswig-Holstein-Sonderburg, daughter of John II, Duke of Schleswig-Holstein-Sonderburg. This marriage is childless.

== See also ==
- List of Pomeranian duchies and dukes
- History of Pomerania
- Duchy of Pomerania
- House of Pomerania

== Literature ==
- Werner Buchholz (ed.): Deutsche Geschichte im Osten Europas. Pommern. Siedler Verlag, Berlin 1999, ISBN 3-88680-272-8, pp. 216, 233.
- Martin Wehrmann: Geschichte von Pommern, 2d ed., vol. 2, Verlag Andreas Perthes, Gotha, 1921. Reprinted: Weltbild Verlag, Augsburg, 1992, ISBN 3-89350-112-6.

Bogislaw XIII House of Griffins Born: 9 August 1544 Died: 7 March 1606
Preceded by Philip I	Dukes of Pomerania-Wolgast altogether under tutelage until 1567; 1560–1569 with his brothers Ernest Louis (1560–1592); John Frederick (1560–1569); Barnim X (1560–1569)	Succeeded by Ernest Louis
New division	Duke of Pomerania-Barth; 1569-1606	Succeeded by Francis
New division	Duke of Pomerania-Rügenwalde (Darłowo); 1569-1606	Succeeded by George II and Bogislaw XIV
Preceded by Barnim X	Duke of Pomerania-Stettin; 1603-1606	Succeeded by Philip II
