= Franzburg =

Town in Mecklenburg-Vorpommern, Germany

- Town
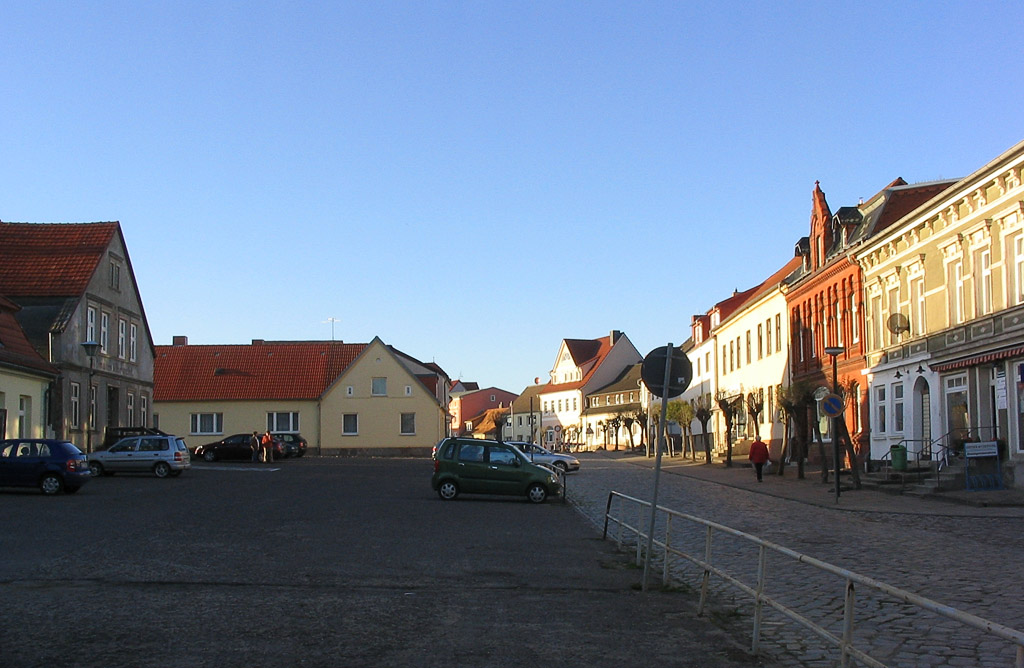
- Town center

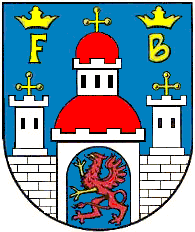
- Coat of arms

- Location of Franzburg within Vorpommern-Rügen district
- Interactive map of Franzburg
- Location within Germany Location within Mecklenburg-Vorpommern
- Coordinates: 54°10′N 12°52′E
- Country: Germany
- State: Mecklenburg-Vorpommern
- District: Vorpommern-Rügen
- Municipal assoc.: Franzburg-Richtenberg

Government
  - Mayor: Johannes Rudolph

Area
  - Total: 15.2 km^{2} (5.9 sq mi)
- Elevation: 20 m (66 ft)

Population (2025-12-31)
  - Total: 1,294
  - Density: 85.1/km^{2} (220/sq mi)
- Time zone: UTC+01:00 (CET)
  - Summer (DST): UTC+02:00 (CEST)
- Postal codes: 18461
- Dialling codes: 038322
- Vehicle registration: NVP
- Website: www.amt-franzburg-richtenberg.de

Franzburg (German pronunciation: [ˈfʁantsbʊʁk]) is a town in the Vorpommern-Rügen district of Mecklenburg-Vorpommern, Germany. It is situated 20 km southwest of Stralsund. Before the Protestant Reformation, later Franzburg was the site of Neuenkamp Abbey.

== Neuenkamp Abbey ==
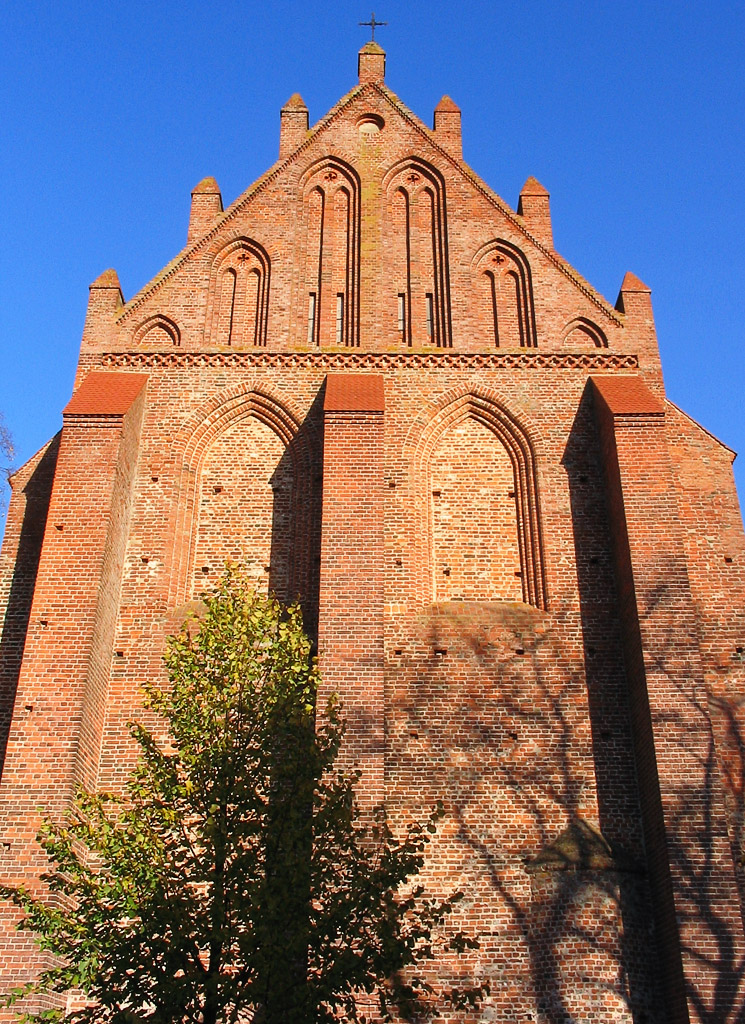
Schloßkirche ("palace's church", only remnant of the Neuenkamp Abbey

In the course of the medieval conversion of Pomerania and German Ostsiedlung, prince Wizlaw I granted the central parts of the woods covering the mainland section of his Principality of Rügen, then Danish, to Cistercian monks from Camp Abbey in Lower Saxony who build Neuenkamp Abbey on 8 November 1231. The monks erected a church that, with a length of 80 meters, a width of 15 meters, and an arch height of 25 meters, was then the largest church in all Pomerania. The possessions of the abbey rapidly increased, 50 years after its foundation the abbey's territory reached the coast. The woods were cleared, and numerous villages of the Hagenhufendorf type were set up and populated with German settlers. In 1325, the last prince of Rügen died without an issue, and Neuenkamp with the rest of the principality was inherited by the dukes of Pomerania. The abbey prospered until it was secularized in 1535, following the Protestant Reformation and the adoption of Lutheranism by the Pomeranian nobility in 1534.

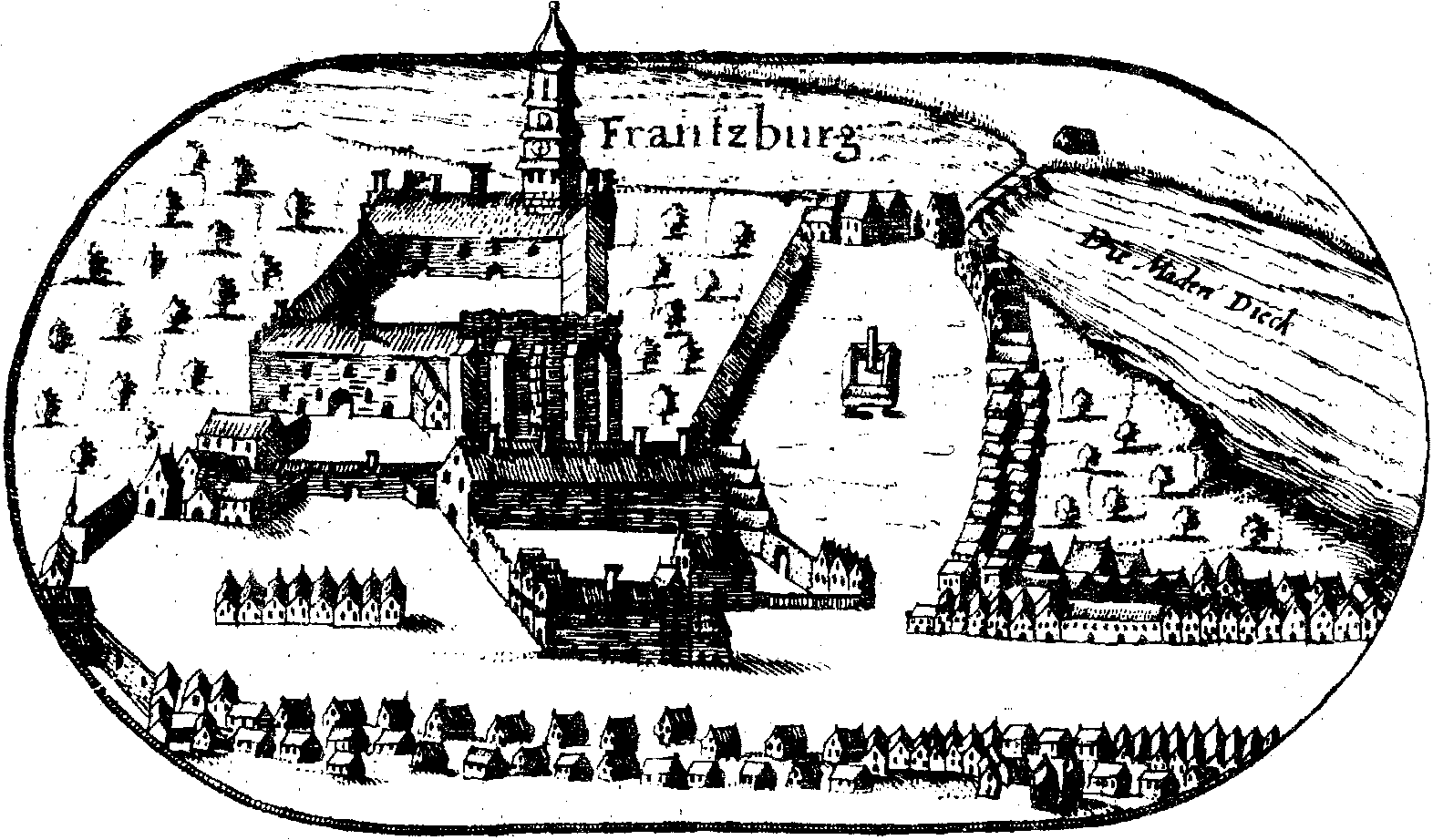
Franzburg on Eilhard Lubinus's map of Pomerania, 1618

Following the secularization, the new owner, duke Bogislaw XIII, rebuilt the abbey as his ducal palace, and turned the former abbey's yards into a town. He modeled the new town after the Republic of Venice, envisioning a town holding a population of nobles, craftsmen, merchants and artists, that was to compete with neighboring Hanseatic Stralsund. As a consequence of these ambitions, he granted the new town no surrounding land, for he did not like the idea of inhabitants doing in agriculture. Rather, he concentrated weavers in the town and had a mint built. He named the town after his father-in-law, Francis of Brunswick-Lüneburg. The abbey's church was torn down in 1561, only the southernmost extremity was left and still stands today. When Bogislaw however inherited Stettin in 1603, he lost interest in his Franzburg ambitions, and the town never grew to the envisioned size and status.

The beginning of the Thirty Years' War in the Duchy of Pomerania was marked by the Capitulation of Franzburg, which provided for the occupation of the duchy by Albrecht von Wallenstein's mercenary army. In the following, the town was devastated completely. Franzburg lost its weaver industry and the mint. Only a century later, in 1728, Franzburg was resettled.

However, it remained the seat of administration of the surrounding Kreis Franzburg(-Barth), basically the mainland part of the former principality of Rügen, until the seat was moved to Barth after World War I.

Today, Franzburg is a municipality in Kreis Vorpommern-Rügen.
