= Barth, Germany =

Town in Mecklenburg-Vorpommern, Germany

Barth
- Town
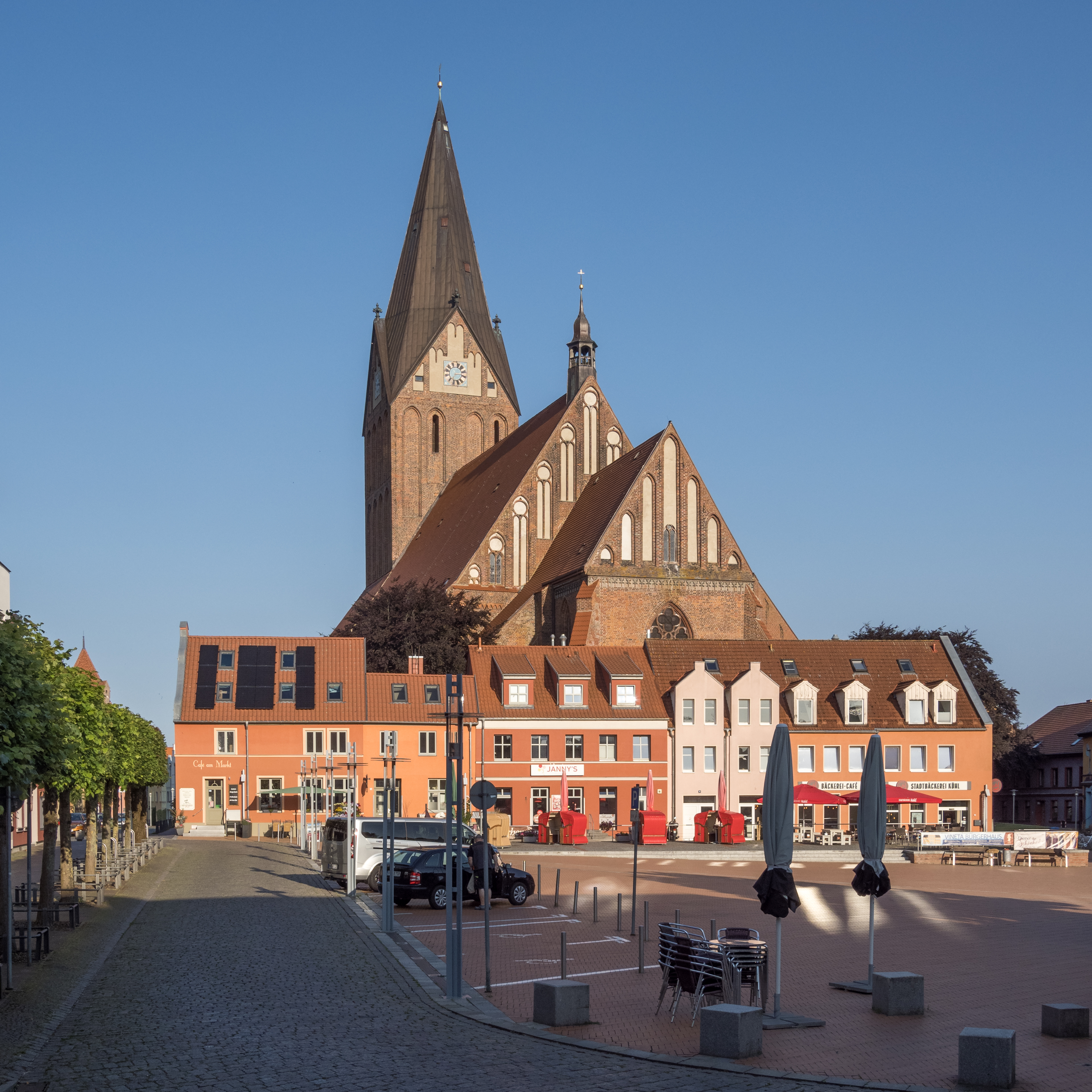

- Coat of arms

- Location of Barth within Vorpommern-Rügen district
- Interactive map of Barth
- Location within Germany Location within Mecklenburg-Vorpommern
- Coordinates: 54°22′N 12°43′E
- Country: Germany
- State: Mecklenburg-Vorpommern
- District: Vorpommern-Rügen
- Municipal assoc.: Barth
- Subdivisions: 4

Government
  - Mayor: Stefan Kerth (SPD)

Area
  - Total: 41.18 km^{2} (15.90 sq mi)
- Elevation: 2 m (6.6 ft)

Population (2025-12-31)
  - Total: 8,235
  - Density: 200.0/km^{2} (517.9/sq mi)
- Time zone: UTC+01:00 (CET)
  - Summer (DST): UTC+02:00 (CEST)
- Postal codes: 18356
- Dialling codes: 038231
- Vehicle registration: NVP
- Website: www.stadt-barth.de

Barth (German pronunciation: [baːɐ̯t] is a town in Mecklenburg-Vorpommern in north-eastern Germany. It is situated at a lagoon (Bodden) of the Baltic Sea facing the Fischland-Darss-Zingst peninsula. Barth belongs to the district of Vorpommern-Rügen. It is close to the Western Pomerania Lagoon Area National Park. In 2011, it held a population of 8,706.

== History ==
=== Middle Ages ===
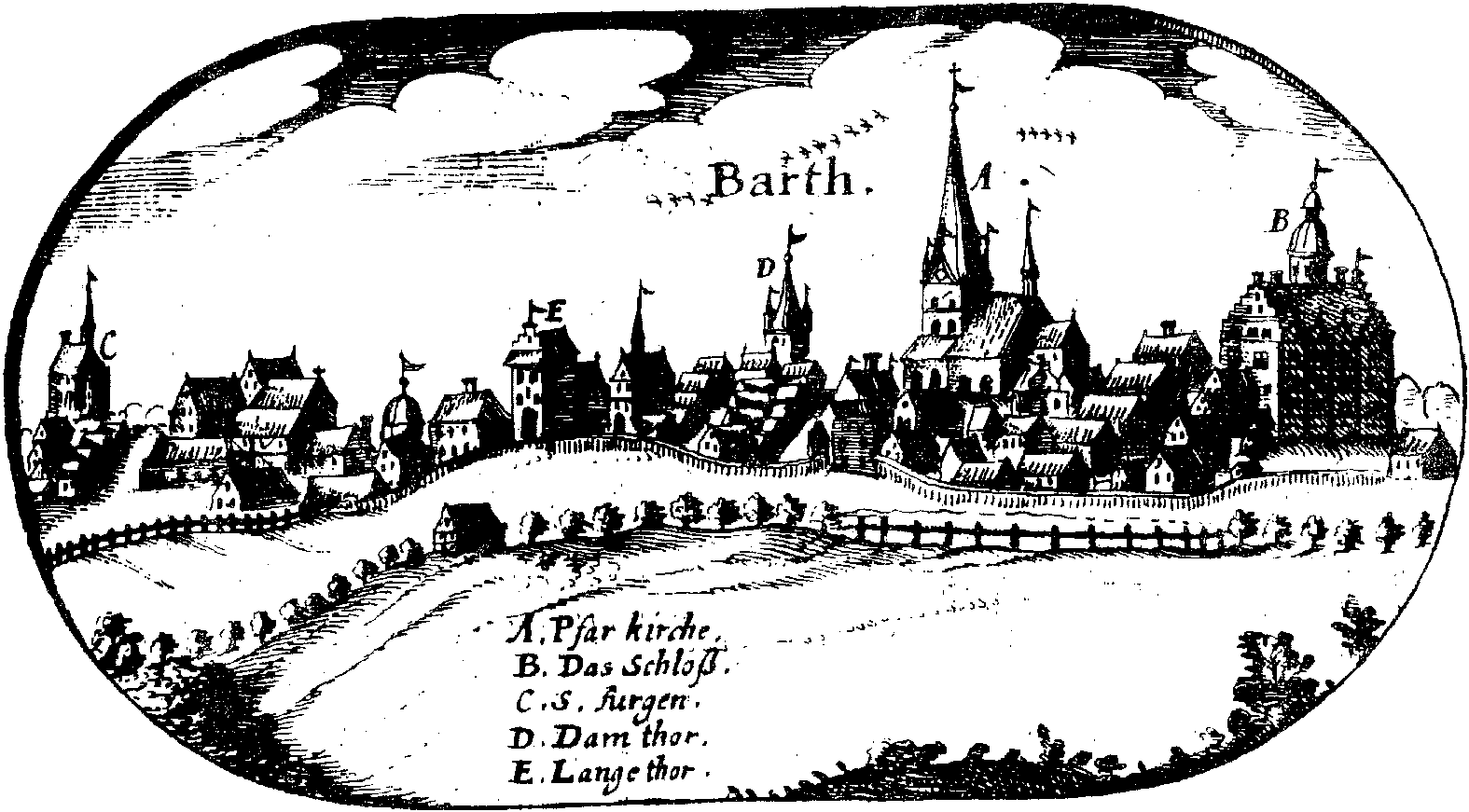
Historical view of Barth in 1618, from the Lubin map made by Eilhard Lubinus

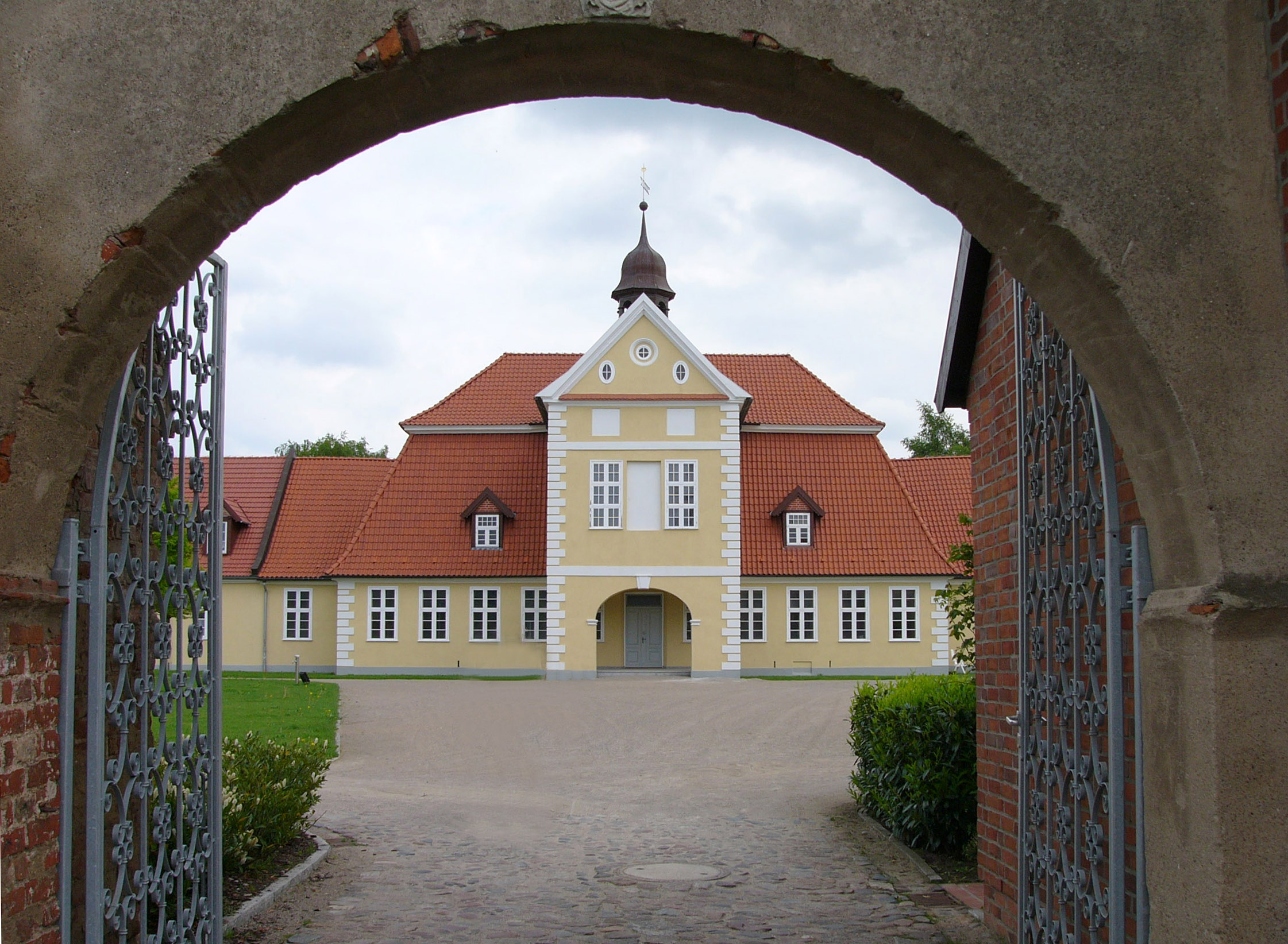
Former abbey of Barth

Barth dates back to the medieval German Ostsiedlung, before which the area was settled by Wends of the Liuticians or Rani tribe. Jaromar II, Danish prince of Rügen, granted the town Lübeck law in 1255. In the same document, he agreed to remove his burgh, Borgwall or Neue Burg, then on the northwestern edge of the town's projected limits. Another Wendish burgh, Alte Burg near today's train station, was not used anymore. The German town was set up on empty space between the burghs. Not a member of the Hanseatic League, the town never grew to the importance and size of neighboring Hanseatic towns like Stralsund. The last prince of Rügen, Vitslav III, erected a court at the site of former Neue Burg in 1315. He often resided in Barth.

After Vitslav's death without an issue in 1325, his principality was inherited by Wartislaw IV of the Duchy of Pomerania, who however had to enforce his claims by two subsequent wars with Mecklenburg. During these wars, Barth was fortified with a stone and brick wall. The wars as well as contemporary and subsequent Black Death epidemics (1349, 1405 and 1451) and floods hindered Barth's growth. In 1452, Barth was besieged by Mecklenburgian troops when Wartislaw IX did not pay his debts. Hostilities between the Pomeranian dukes Eric II and Wartislaw X on one side and the Hanseatic towns of Stralsund and Greifswald, Mecklenburg and the Margraviate of Brandenburg on the other side had an additional negative impact on the town.

=== Protestant Reformation ===
In 1533, the Protestant Reformation turned Barth into a Lutheran town. In 1572, Bogislaw XIII rebuilt the ducal court in Renaissance style, and married Clare of Brunswick-Lüneburg who was later buried in Barth. Bogislaw planned to oppose Stralsund by founding Franzburg in her hinterland, Barth was thought to function as Franzburg's port and staple place. While the plan eventually failed, Bogislaw's investments led to some slight prosperity which was only disturbed by the Black Death epidemics of 1597 and 1598.

In 1627, during the Thirty Years' War, Albrecht von Wallenstein's imperial army entered Protestant Pomerania and, after they were repelled from Barth, re-took the town and exacted revenge. Before the Swedish forces entered Barth in 1630, retreating imperial troops led by Maritzen looted the town. As the war went on, some women convicted as witches were burned in the town between 1645 and 1653, three had already been burned in 1611.

=== Inclusion in Swedish Pomerania ===
After the war, Barth became part of Swedish Pomerania. In the early Swedish period, three stormfloods (1649, 1663, and 1693), a fire in 1662, and another fire in 1678 ravaged the town; the second fire was lit by Brandenburg's von Treffenfeld during the Scanian War. During the Great Northern War, the evicted Polish king Stanislaus Leszczynski was assigned Barth's old ducal court by his friend and ally, Holy Roman Emperor Karl XII, and stayed from August 1710 until March 1711. Then, Barth was conquered by Denmark. By the end of the war, when Barth became Swedish again, less than half of the town's houses were inhabited. After a fire in 1722, the number of houses was reduced to 76.

The town however recovered and in 1795 the number of houses had risen to 520, housing a population of 3,150. Yet, the town did not exceed its medieval limits. The fortifications surrounding the town were turned into a park in 1786.

In 1807, during the Napoleonic Wars, Barth was taken by French troops. A Swedish counterattack was repelled, and Barth was turned into a French garrison until the Swedish-French peace treaty.

=== Prussian rule ===
The Swedes left Barth after Swedish Pomerania was assigned to Prussia in 1815. From then on, the town was part of the Prussian Province of Pomerania.

In 1850, a cholera epidemic lasted for seven weeks. In 1872, Barth was affected by a stormflood, that retreated only after ten days.

During the second half of the 19th century, the town expanded beyond its medieval limits for the first time. On 1 July 1888, Barth was connected to the Rostock-Stralsund railways, in 1902 a gas plant was built, and in 1920 electricity was introduced.

=== World Wars ===
After the First World War, the Free State of Prussia moved the Kreis headquarters from Franzburg to Barth.

During World War II Barth was the site of the Stalag Luft I and Stalag Luft II German prisoner-of-war camps for captured Allied airmen, however, the latter was relocated to Łódź in occupied Poland in 1941. Stalag Luft I held mostly American and British POWs. The presence of the camp is said to have shielded the town from Allied bombing. On 30 April 1945, the German personnel fled the camp, and two days later it was liberated by Soviet troops.

One of the largest subcamps of the Ravensbrück concentration camp was operated in Barth during World War II, in which a total of some 6,000 men and women were imprisoned, mostly Russian, Polish and Ukrainian, but also Yugoslav, French, Jewish, Italian, Croatian, Romani and others. From February 1945, many exhausted prisoners were evacuated from subcamps of Ravensbrück in Karlshagen and Police to Barth, where they eventually died. On 30 April 1945, the SS launched a further death march from Barth westwards, whereas some 300 severely ill and exhausted prisoners were left in Barth, and liberated on 1 May 1945.

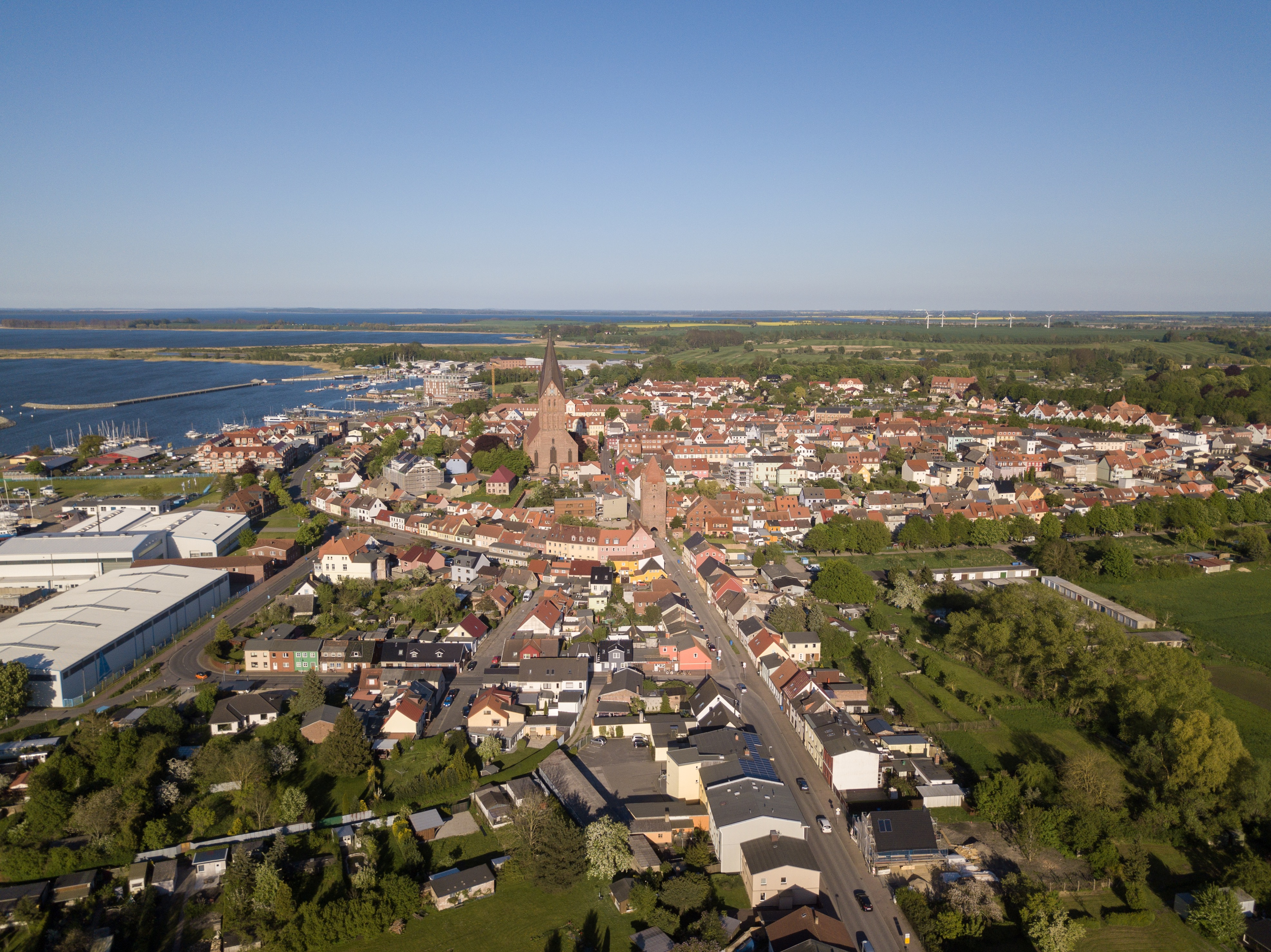
Barth: View from the west

=== GDR and recent history ===
Kreis Franzburg-Barth was dissolved in 1952, when it was partitioned between Kreis Ribnitz-Damgarten (with Barth) and Kreis Stralsund, both belonging to the newly created district of Rostock (Bezirk Rostock). With the Fall of the Iron Curtain and German reunification, an extensive renovation of the old town centre of Barth was initiated - mainly due to the urban development promotion programme of Germany. The town harbour and surrounding areas were revitalized with residential and commercial buildings. The city is a popular destination for tourists now, especially in connection with the Fischland-Darss-Zingst peninsula and the UNESCO World Heritage city of Stralsund.

In 2005, Barth celebrated 750 years of its town ordinances and privileges. Since the local government reform on September 4, 2011, Barth has belonged to the Vorpommern-Rügen district in the state of Mecklenburg-Vorpommern.

== Climate ==
Barth has a moderate climate. Average temperature and precipitation between 1961 and 1990 are shown below.

Climate data for Barth (1991–2020 normals)
Month	Jan	Feb	Mar	Apr	May	Jun	Jul	Aug	Sep	Oct	Nov	Dec	Year
Mean daily maximum °C (°F)	3.2 (37.8)	4.1 (39.4)	7.1 (44.8)	12.5 (54.5)	16.7 (62.1)	19.9 (67.8)	22.5 (72.5)	22.5 (72.5)	18.3 (64.9)	13.0 (55.4)	7.7 (45.9)	4.4 (39.9)	12.7 (54.9)
Daily mean °C (°F)	1.1 (34.0)	1.5 (34.7)	3.5 (38.3)	7.8 (46.0)	11.9 (53.4)	15.4 (59.7)	17.8 (64.0)	17.7 (63.9)	14.0 (57.2)	9.5 (49.1)	5.2 (41.4)	2.3 (36.1)	9.0 (48.2)
Mean daily minimum °C (°F)	−1.5 (29.3)	−1.3 (29.7)	−0.2 (31.6)	2.9 (37.2)	6.5 (43.7)	10.0 (50.0)	12.5 (54.5)	12.6 (54.7)	9.7 (49.5)	5.9 (42.6)	2.5 (36.5)	−0.2 (31.6)	4.9 (40.8)
Average precipitation mm (inches)	48.7 (1.92)	39.7 (1.56)	40.8 (1.61)	35.3 (1.39)	51.4 (2.02)	67.1 (2.64)	65.2 (2.57)	73.4 (2.89)	57.5 (2.26)	58.5 (2.30)	47.4 (1.87)	55.4 (2.18)	639.9 (25.19)
Average precipitation days (≥ 0.1 mm)	17.1	15.1	14.0	11.6	13.0	13.7	14.5	14.4	14.2	16.8	16.4	17.8	178.9
Average relative humidity (%)	87.4	84.7	81.3	76.2	75.8	76.1	76.2	77.0	80.9	84.4	88.0	88.2	81.3
Mean monthly sunshine hours	45.8	69.3	134.0	209.9	257.9	259.9	258.0	228.4	170.9	110.2	52.3	34.6	1,825.1
Source: NOAA

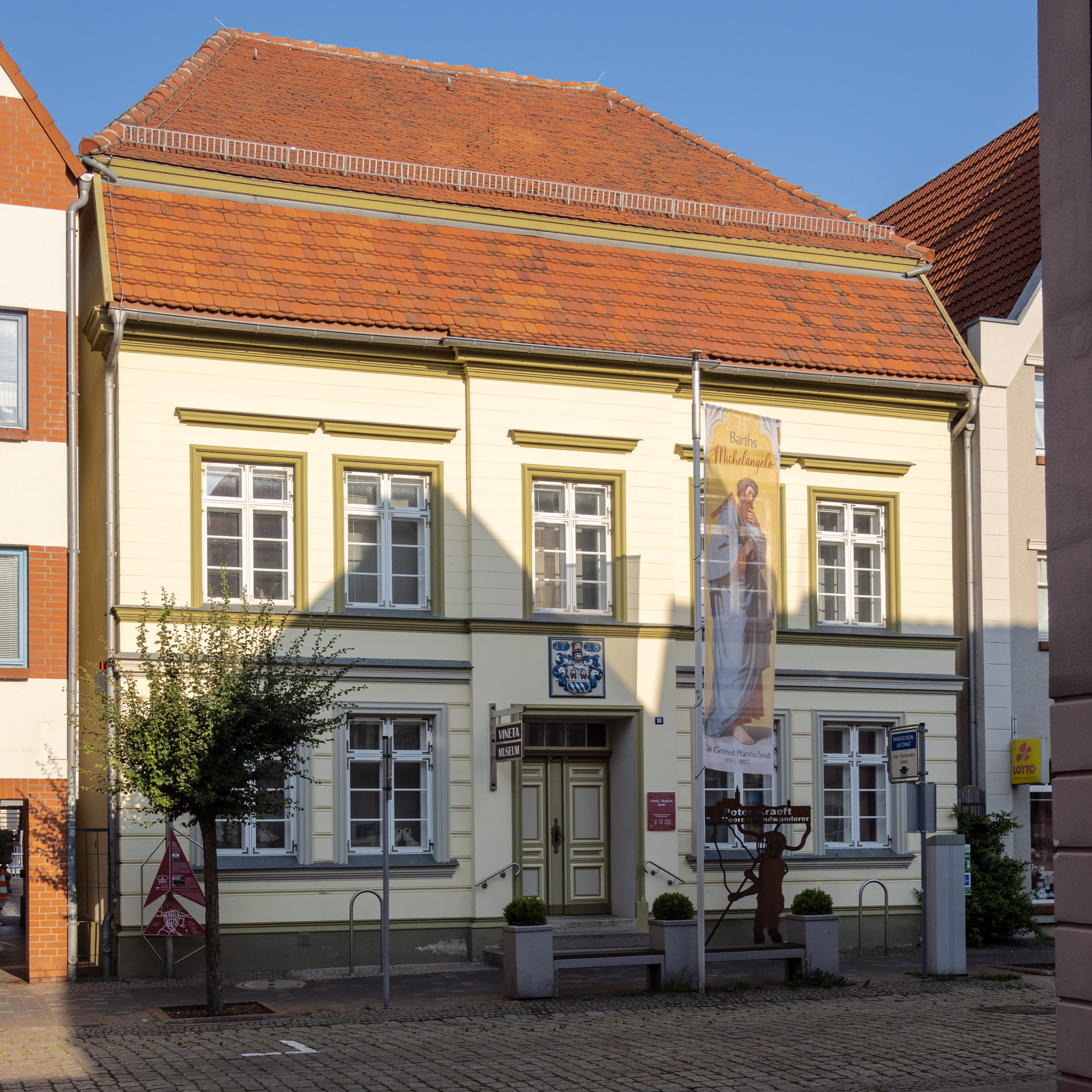
Vineta-Museum

== Transport ==
- Barth railway station is served by local services to Stralsund.
- Stralsund Barth Airport (also referred to as Baltic Sea Airport) is serving Barth and the UNESCO World heritage city of Stralsund and the adjacent economy and tourism regions of the Vorpommern-Rügen district.

== Vineta ==
According to a theory by Goldmann and Wermusch, Barth is the site of the sunken town of Vineta. Barth is attracting tourists with the Vineta legend. Nowadays, there is a Vineta museum and a Vineta festival in the town.

== Notable people ==
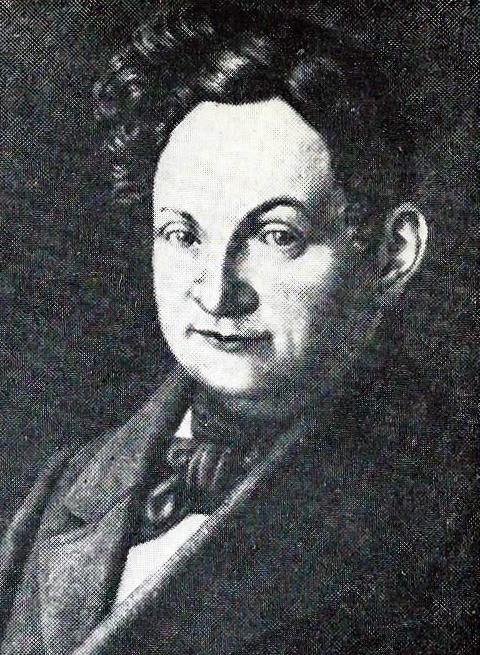
Gustav Friedrich Wohlbrück, 1840's

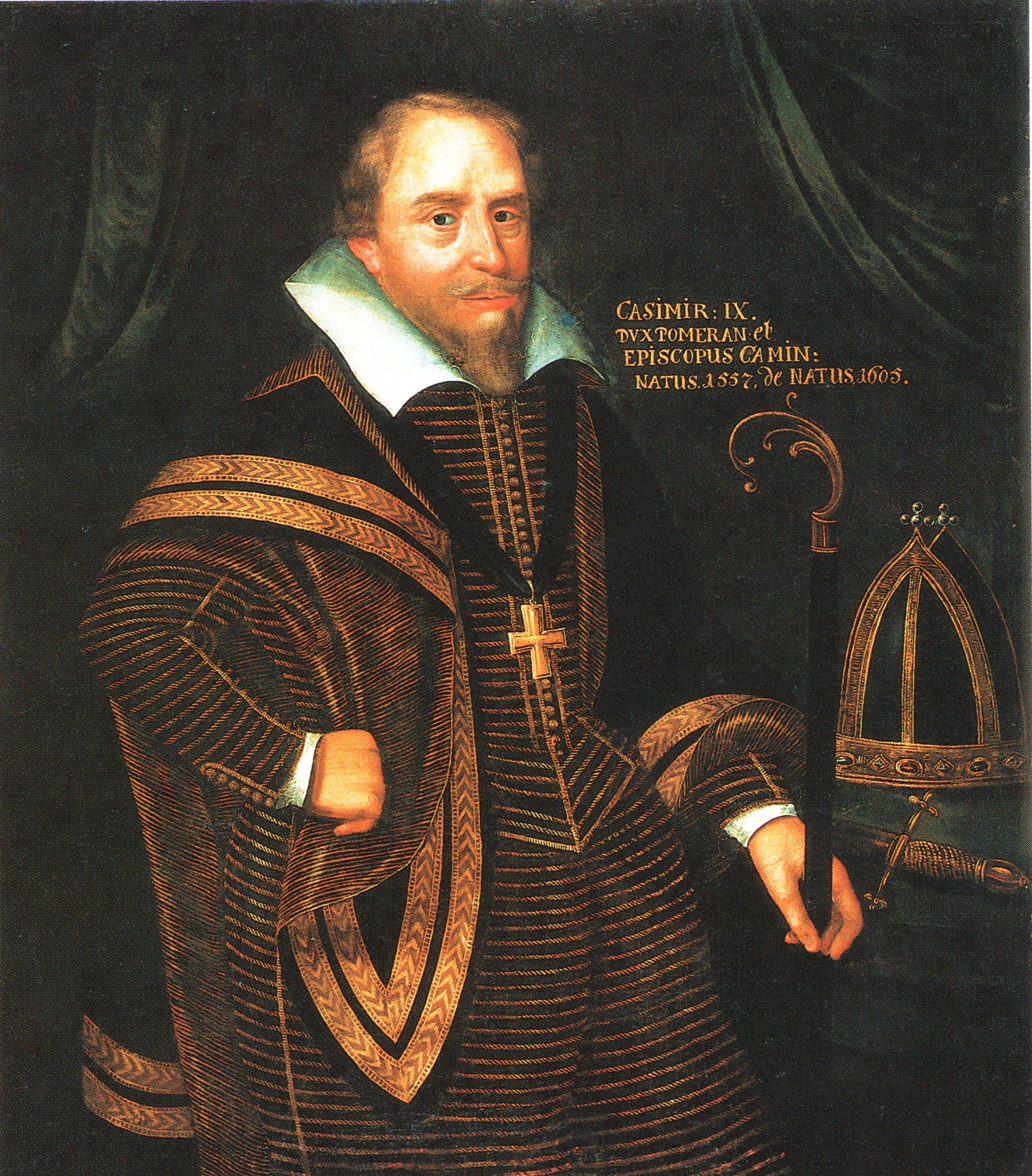
Ulrich, Duke of Pomerania, ca1650

- Georg Ludwig Spalding (1762–1811), philologist
- Gustav Friedrich Wohlbrück (1793–1849), a German actor and theatre director.
- Ferdinand Jühlke (1815–1893), a Prussian horticulturist
- Wilhelm Holtz (1836–1913), physicist, invented the "Holtz electrostatic influence machine"
- Erich Gülzow (1888–1954), local historian, philologist and publisher.
- Werner Fuetterer (1907–1991), film actor

=== Sport ===
- Helmut Losch (1947–2005), world class weightlifter, bronze medallist at the 1976 Summer Olympics
- Jürgen Heuser (born 1953), weightlifter, silver medallist at the 1980 Summer Olympics
- Sylvia Rose, (born 1962), rower and team gold medallist at the 1988 Summer Olympics

=== Aristocracy ===
- Anna of Pomerania, (1590–1660), daughter of Bogislaw XIII, Duke of Pomerania, who married into the Imperial House of Croÿ, was born in Barth
- Francis, Duke of Pomerania (1577–1620), Duke of Pomerania
- Bogislaw XIV, Duke of Pomerania, (1580–1637), last duke of Pomerania
- George II, Duke of Pomerania (1582–1617), a non-reigning Duke of Pomerania
- Ulrich, Duke of Pomerania (1589–1622), Protestant Bishop of Pomerania and non-reigning Duke of Pomerania

== See also ==
- History of Pomerania
