= Sophie of Brandenburg =

Regent of Saxony (1568–1622)

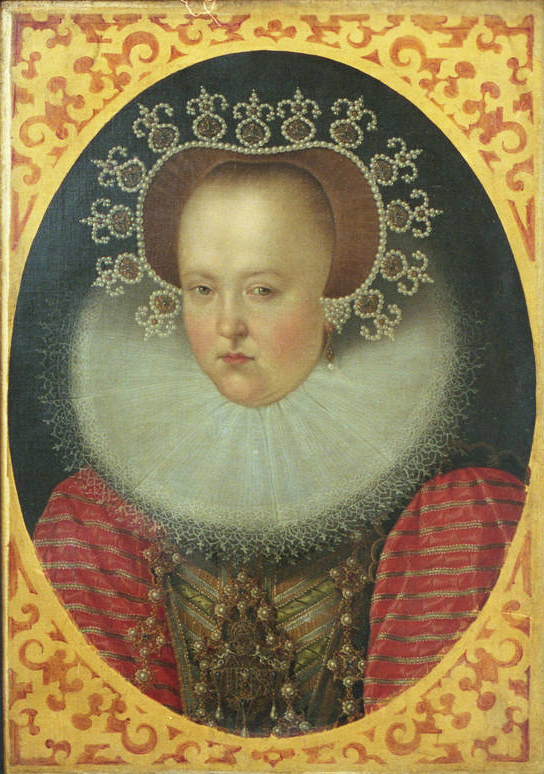
- Portrait by Andreas Riehl the Younger, c. 1589–91
- Born: 6 June 1568; Zechlin castle, Rheinsberg
- Died: 7 December 1622 (aged 54); Colditz Castle
- Spouse: Christian I, Elector of Saxony (m. 1582; died 1591)
- Issue Detail: Christian II, Elector of Saxony; John George I, Elector of Saxony; Sophie, Duchess of Pomerania; Prince Augustus; Dorothea, Abbess of Quedlinburg
Names
- Sophie of Brandenburg
- House: Hohenzollern
- Father: John George, Elector of Brandenburg
- Mother: Sabina of Brandenburg-Ansbach

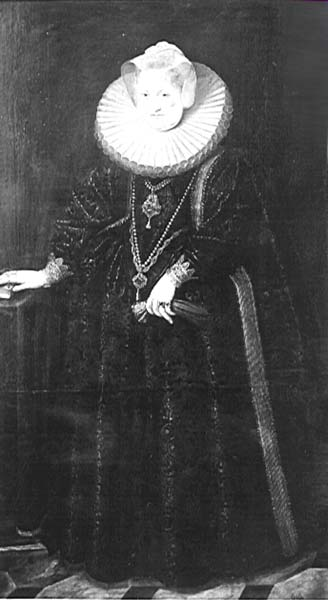
Sophie, Electress of Saxony

Sophie of Brandenburg (6 June 1568 – 7 December 1622) was Electress of Saxony by marriage to Christian I, Elector of Saxony. She was regent from 1591 to 1601 during the minority of their son Christian II.

== Biography ==
Sophie was born at Zechlin castle, Rheinsberg, a daughter of the Elector of Brandenburg John George (1525–1598) by his second marriage with Sabina of Brandenburg-Ansbach (1548–1575), daughter of Margrave George of Brandenburg-Ansbach.

On 25 April 1582 in Dresden, Sophie married Elector Christian I of Saxony (1560–1591). Sophie was 14 years old at her wedding, and after a year she had her first child.

=== Regency ===
After the death of her husband, who died at age 31, Sophie, together with Duke Frederick William I of Saxe Weimar, became Regent of the Electorate for her eldest son.

Sophie was an orthodox Lutheran, and fought against crypto-Calvinism in Saxony. After Christian I's death in 1591, she had the Calvinist Chancellor Nikolaus Krell, an opponent of Lutheran orthodoxy, imprisoned at the Königstein Fortress, and in 1601 had him executed at the Dresden Neumarkt. In allusion to the pious widow Judith in the Book of Judith, the orthodox Lutherans thereafter celebrated her as "Judith of Saxony".

As a widow, Sophie lived in the so-called "Fraumutterhaus" in Dresden or in Castle Colditz. She had her own gold coins ("Sophie ducats", Sophiendukaten) minted; she also had the old Franciscan church in Dresden again readied for divine service (1599–1610), which after her was called the Sophienkirche. The "Duchess's Garden" (Der Herzogin Garten) also takes its name from Duchess Sophie. She died at Colditz Castle.

== Issue ==
Sophie had the following children:

1. Christian II (b. Dresden, 23 September 1583 – d. Dresden, 23 June 1611), successor of his father as elector.
2. John George I (b. Dresden, 5 March 1585 – d. Dresden, 8 October 1656), successor of his brother as elector.
3. Anna Sabine (b. Dresden, 25 January 1586 – d. Dresden, 24 March 1586).
4. Sophie (b. Dresden, 29 April 1587 – d. Stettin, 9 December 1635), married on 26 August 1610 to Duke Francis I of Pomerania.
5. Elisabeth (b. Dresden, 21 July 1588 – d. Dresden, 4 March 1589).
6. Augustus (b. Dresden, 7 September 1589 – d. Naumburg, 26 December 1615), married on 1 January 1612 to Elisabeth of Brünswick-Wolfenbüttel. This marriage was childless.
7. Dorothea (b. Dresden, 7 January 1591 – d. Quedlinburg, 17 November 1617), Princess-Abbess of Quedlinburg (1610).

== Biographical accounts ==
- Franz Blanckmeister: Kurfürstin Anna Sophie von Sachsen: eine evangelische Bekennerin, Barmen [um 1891]
- Franz Otto Stichart: Galerie der Sächsischen Fürstinnen; Biogr. Skizzen sämmtl. Ahnfrauen d. Königl. Hauses Sachsen. Quellengemäß dargest., Leipzig 1857
- Ute Essegern: Fürstinnen am kursächsischen Hof, Leipziger Universitätsverlag, 2007
