= Wolfgang Hirschbach =

- Born: 19 January 1570; Gotha, Germany
- Died: 13 September 1620 (aged 50); Wittenberg, Germany

Wolfgang Hirschbach (19 January 1570, Gotha – 13 September 1620, Wittenberg) was a German legal scholar.

== Life ==
Wolfgang was the son of mayor Christoph Hirschbach and his wife Anna, who was the daughter merchant Hieronymus Poppe from Gotha. Hirschbach lost his mother at the age of three. He attended the Latin school in Gotha, which was under the direction John Helders who later became Gotha's superintendent. There Hirschbach acquired a solid education and insight and experience that had a lasting impact on his character and formed way of living. He was intended to follow an academic career from an early age. This explains his enrollment at the University of Jena in 1585. He went there after the completion of his training in Gotha in 1587.

In Jena he followed the customs of the time and to first studied the philosophical sciences, and then turned to a degree in law. On 9 September 1593 he continued his studies at the University of Wittenberg. He completed his doctorate there on 7 March 1598 with a degree of Doctor of law. As early as 1595, Hirschbach acted as a tutor and teacher for a number of young nobles, in Wittenberg and also in Leipzig. Apparently, his lessons had merit and on 30 September the Electoral family 1601 hired him as preceptor of Duke August of Saxony. After his brother in law Benedikt Carpzov the elder left Wittenberg in 1602, Hirschbach was appointed professor on the fourth chair, presumably on the recommendation of the Electoral family.

In 1608 he was promoted to the third chair of the criminal law. Associated with this chair, were a position as assessor at the electoral court of justice, the Law Faculty and the Schöppenstuhl in Wittenberg. In that task, he read the materias juris emphyteutici et compensationes and he managed during the summer semester 1611 is the office of the Rector Magnificus of the University of Wittenberg.

He died on 13 September 1620 from a fever and was buried on 17 September in Wittenberg.

== Family ==
On 21 May 1604 he married Magaretha Selfisch (born 22 September 1587 in Wittenberg), the youngest daughter of the Samuel Selfisch. From this marriage nine children were born; three died before their father.

Hirschbach must have had a close private connection to the Elector's family, as the Wittenberg parish register mentions on the baptismal record of his first-born son August, Elector Christian II of Saxony and Sophie of Brandenburg as godparents.

1. August Hirschbach (born 24 April 1605 in Wittenberg, died 5 September 1626 in Wittenberg)
2. Christian Hirschbach (born 26 June 1606 in Wittenberg)
3. Magaretha Hirschbach (born 18 February 1608 in Wittenberg; died 19 May 1630 in Wittenberg), married 6 November 1627 to M. Martin Martinus, vicar in Sohlen
4. Anna Sabina Hirschbach (born 8 May 1610 in Wittenberg; died 1641), married on 1 August 1631 with Cornelius Crull from Dresden
5. Wolfgang Christoph Hirschbach (born 12 August 1611 in Wittenberg; died 10 March 1612 in Wittenberg)
6. Samuel Hirschbach (born 25 February 1613 in Wittenberg; died 5 March 1613 in Wittenberg)
7. Christopher II Wolfgang Hirschbach (born 25 February 1613 in Wittenberg; died 6 March 1613 in Wittenberg)
8. Christina Elizabeth Hirschbach (born 10 October 1614 in Wittenberg; died 9 October 1633 in Wittenberg)
9. Wolfgang Ludwig Hirschbach (born 26 August 1619 in Wittenberg), student of the University of Wittenberg and, in 1640, at the University of Leipzig.

== Selected works ==
- Synopsis quaestionum feudalium, Wittenberg 1600
- De reconventionibus, Wittenberg 1611
- De Crimins laesae majestatis, Wittenberg 1615
- De compensationibus, Wittenberg 1616
- De regalibus, Wittenberg 1618
- Ad L. un. C. de his qui parentes, Wittenberg 1619

== Additional sources ==
- R. Strinzing: History of the law, R. Oldenbourg Verlag, Munich and Leipzig, 1880, Part 1, p. 655, 722
- Ernst Reimann: Princely education in Saxony at the end of the 16th and at the beginning of the 17th Century, Verlag Wilhelm Baensch, Dresden, 1904, p. 163
- Hans Konrad Leonhard: Samuel Selfisch: a German bookseller at the close of the 16th Century, Jäh & Schunke, Leipzig 1902
- Christian Gottlieb Jöcher: General Scholars Lexicon, Leipzig 1750, Part 2, p. 1627
- Fritz Roth: Evaluations of funeral sermons and writings for personal genealogical and historical and cultural purposes, Volume 7, p. 467
- Walter Friedensburg: History of the University of Wittenberg, Max Niemeyer, Halle (Saale), 1917
- Baptismal, death and marriage books Wittenberg
- Johann Samuel Ersch and Johann Gottfried Gruber: Allgemeine Encyclopädie der Wissenschaften und Künste, Brockhaus, Leipzig 1831, 2nd Section, Part 8, p. 416
- Karl Kehrbach: Monumenta Germaniae Paedagogica, A. Hofmann & Co., Berlin 1913, volume LII
