= August of Saxony =

Administrator of the diocese of Naumburg-Zeitz

- Coat-of-arms of the House of Wettin, rulers in Saxony.
- Born: 7 September 1589; Dresden
- Died: 26 December 1615 (aged 26); Naumburg
- Spouse: Elisabeth of Brunswick-Wolfenbüttel, Duchess of Saxe-Altenburg
- House: House of Wettin
- Father: Christian I of Saxony
- Mother: Sophie of Brandenburg

August of Saxony (7 September 1589, Dresden – 26 December 1615, Naumburg) from the Albertine line of the House of Wettin was Administrator of the diocese of Naumburg-Zeitz.

== Life ==
August was the youngest son of the elector Christian I of Saxony (1560–1591) from his marriage to Sophie of Brandenburg (1568–1622), daughter of the elector John George of Brandenburg. His older brothers Christian II and John George I were successively Electors of Saxony. From the latter August received an annual pension of 21,000 florins and the district of Senftenberg.

August graduated from the University of Wittenberg, where Wolfgang Hirschbach had been entrusted the task to guide this young nobleman in his training. During this period he held from the winter semester 1601 until 1606, the position of Rector Magnificus; the academic aspect of this office was performed by a pro-rector.

He married Elisabeth of Brunswick-Wolfenbüttel (1593–1650) on 1 January 1612 in Dresden. She was a daughter of Henry Julius of Brunswick-Wolfenbüttel. They had no children, as Elisabeth repeatedly miscarried.

He died suddenly at the age of 26 in Dresden and was buried in the Freiberg Cathedral.

August of Saxony House of Wettin Born: 7 September 1589 Died: 26 December 1615
Preceded by Christian I of Saxony	Administrator of the diocese of Naumburg; 1591–1615	---
