= Königstein Fortress =

Hilltop fortification and former state prison in Saxony, Germany

Coordinates: 50°55′08″N 14°03′24″E

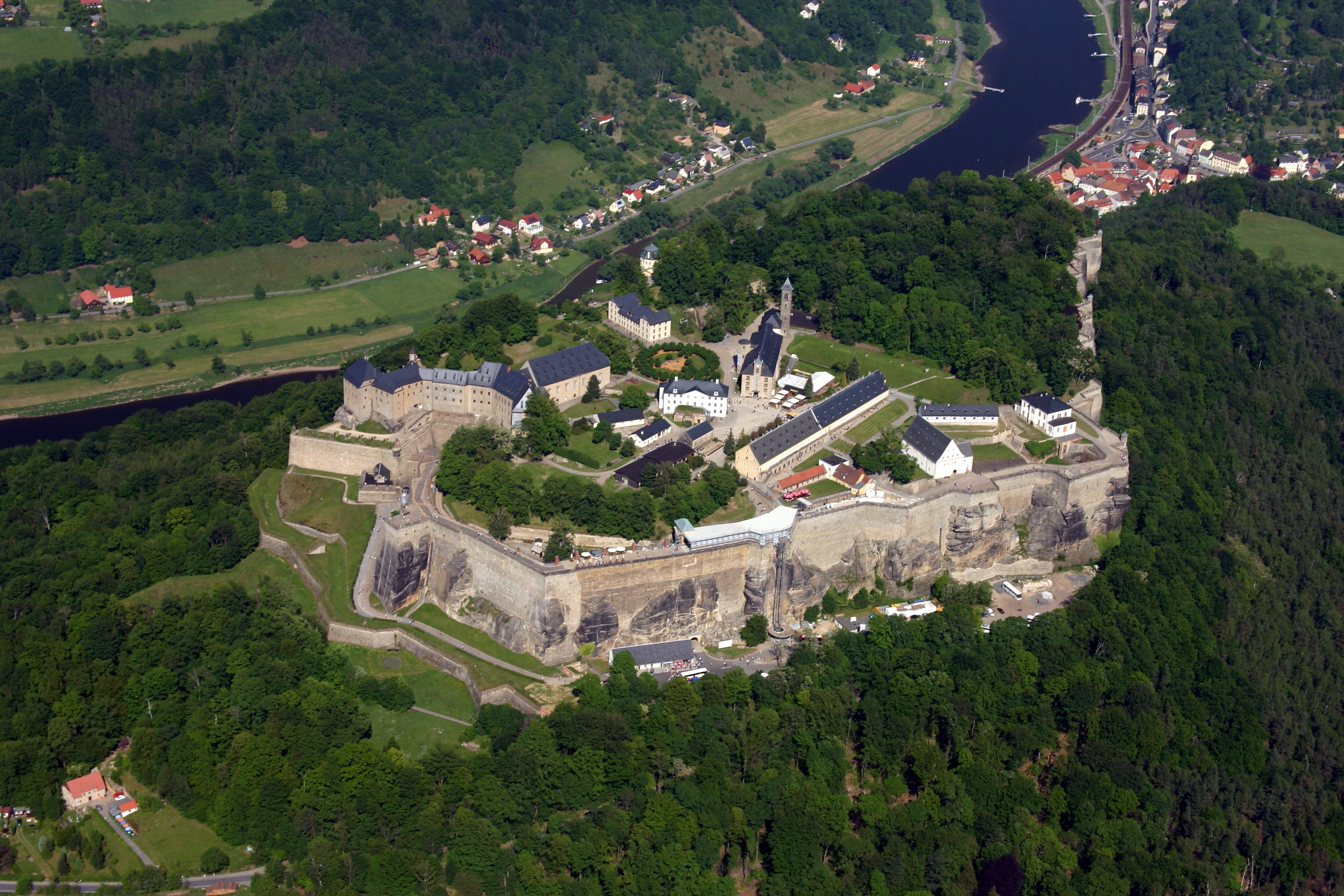
Königstein Fortress in 2008

Königstein Fortress (German: Festung Königstein), the "Saxon Bastille", is a hilltop fortress near Dresden, in Saxon Switzerland, Germany, above the town of Königstein on the left bank of the River Elbe. It is one of the largest hilltop fortifications in Europe and sits atop the table hill of the same name.

The 9.5-hectare (23-acre) rock plateau rises 240 metres (790 ft) above the Elbe and has over 50 buildings, some over 400 years old, that bear witness to the military and civilian life in the fortress. The rampart run of the fortress is 1,800 metres (5,900 ft) long with walls up to 42 metres (138 ft) high and steep sandstone faces. In the centre of the site is a 152.5-metre-deep (500 ft 4 in) well, which is the deepest in Saxony and second-deepest well in Europe.

The fortress, which for centuries was used as a state prison, is still intact and is now one of Saxony's foremost tourist attractions, with 700,000 visitors per year.

== Construction and expansion of the fortress ==
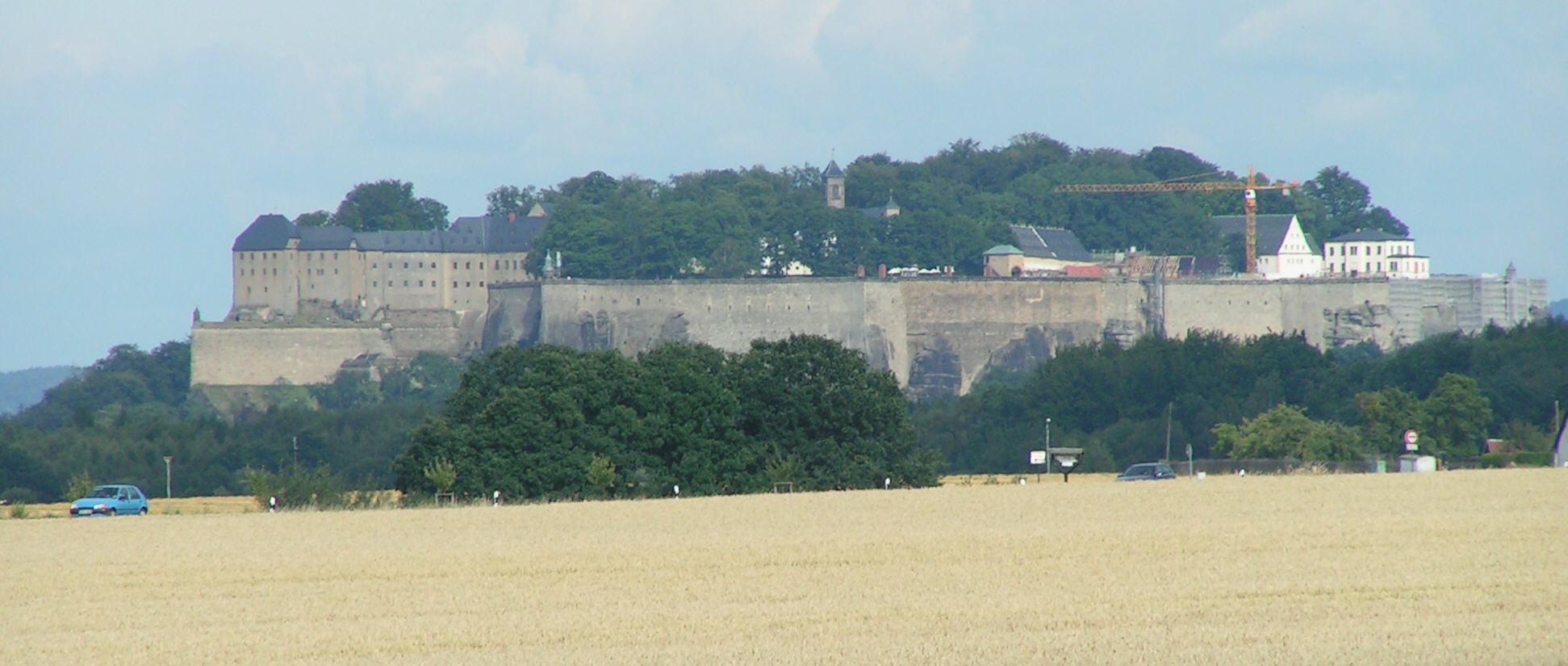
View of the fortress from the B 172 (Pirna-Bad Schandau) road

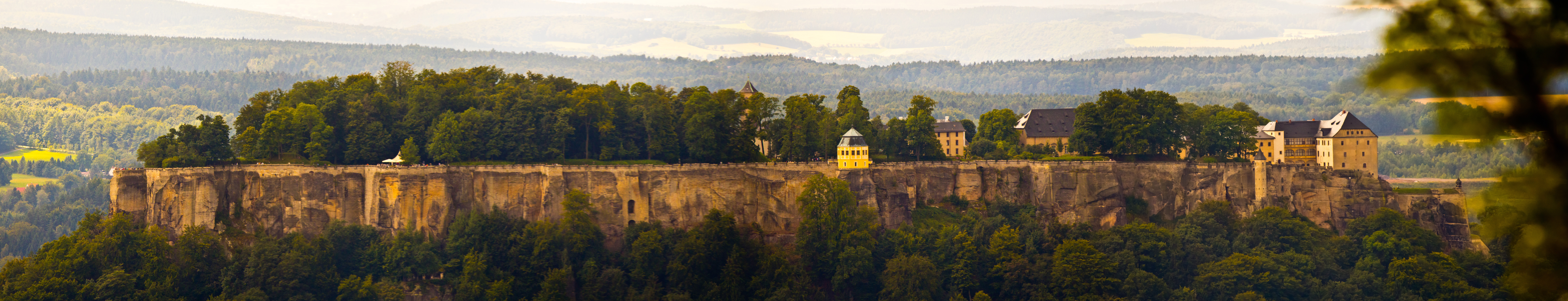
View from Lilienstein

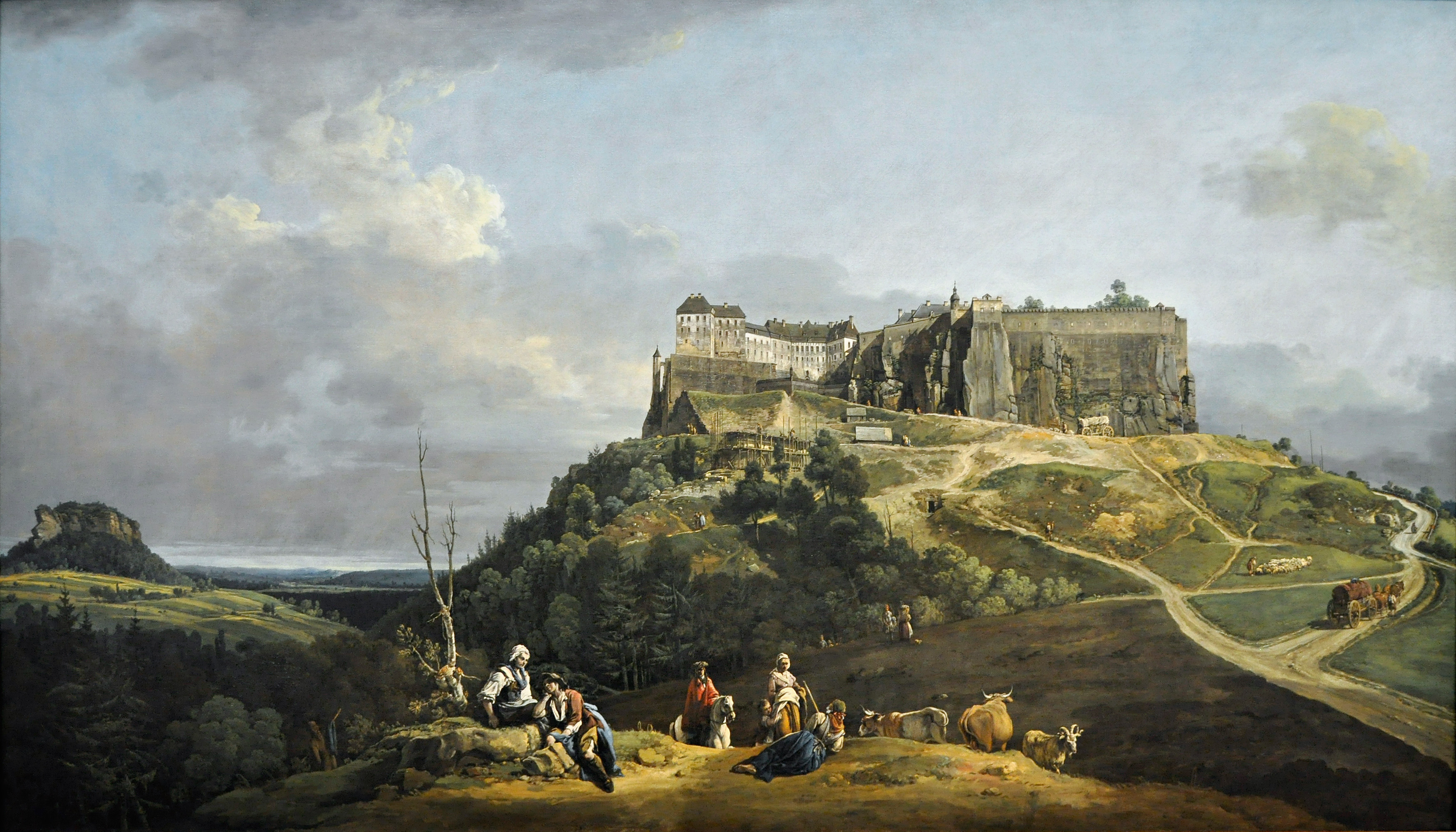
Königstein Fortress, painting by Bernardo Bellotto (created 1756–1758)

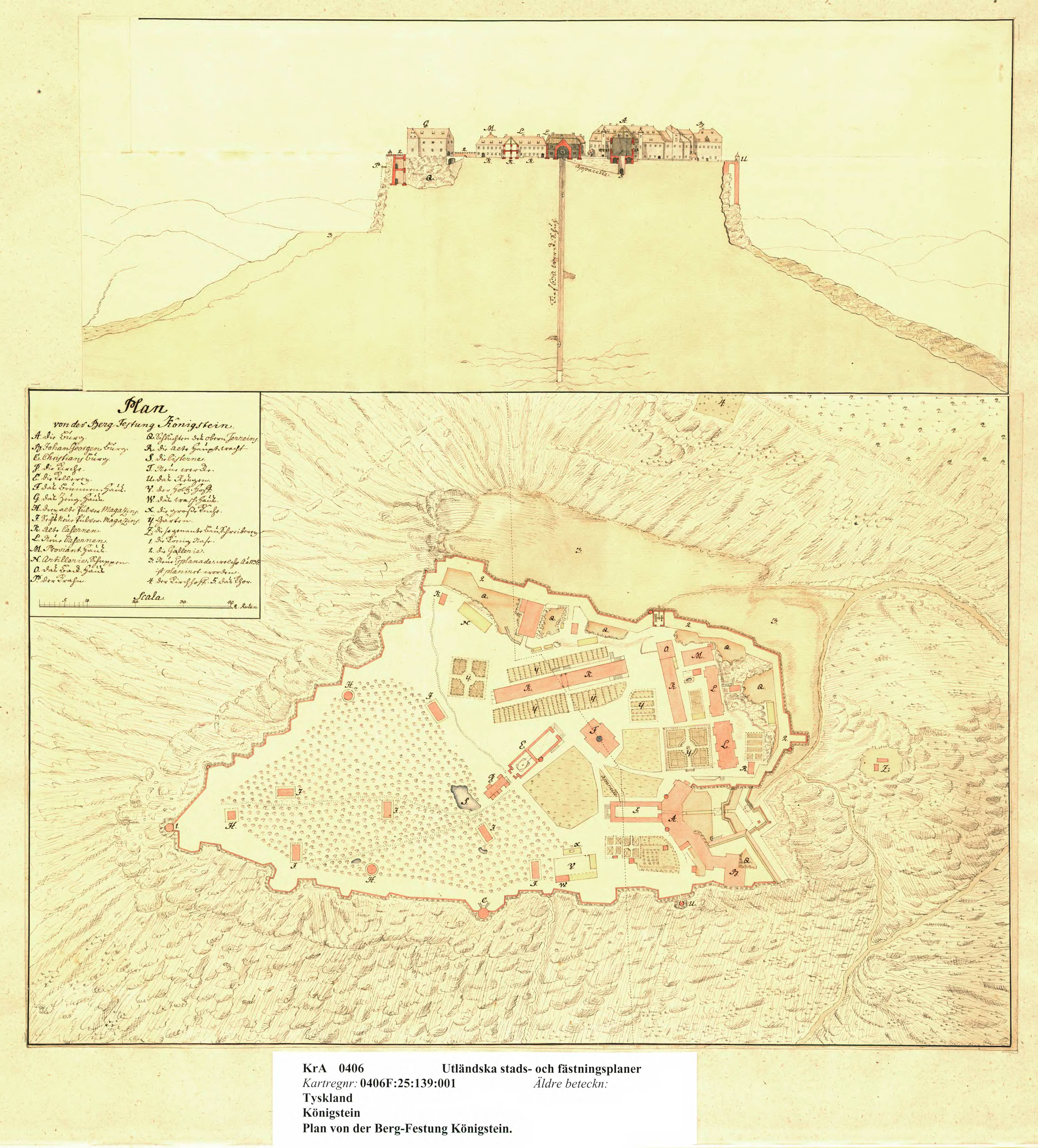
Plan of Königstein Fortress around 1690

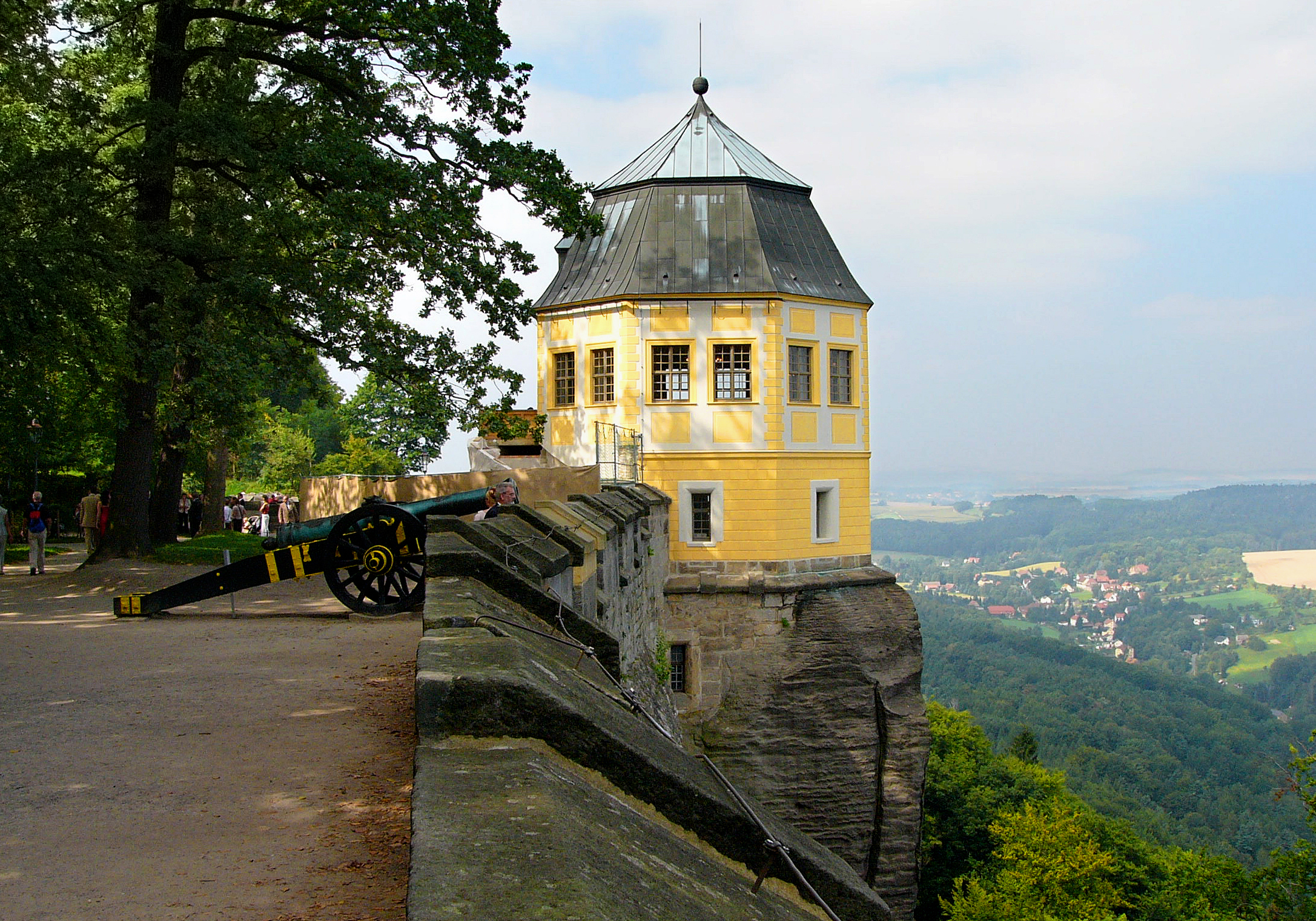
Fortress wall on the east side with the Friedrichsburg

By far the oldest written record of a castle on the Königstein is found in a deed by King Wenceslas I of Bohemia dating to the year 1233, in which a witness is named as "Burgrave Gebhard of Stein". At that time the region was split between the Kingdom of Bohemia and the Bishopric of Meissen. The medieval castle belonged to the Kingdom of Bohemia. Its first full description as Königstein ("King's Rock") occurred in the Upper Lusatian Border Charter (Oberlausitzer Grenzurkunde) of 1241, that Wenceslas I "in lapide regis" (Lat.: at the rock of the king) sealed. In this charter the demarcation of the border between the Slavic Gauen of Milska (Upper Lusatia), Nisani (Meißen Depression) and Dacena (Tetschen region) was laid down. Because the Königstein lay left of the Elbe, it was independent of the 3 aforementioned Gauen.

It belonged at that time to the Kingdom of Bohemia and was expanded by order of the Bohemian kings, as the Elbe became more intensively used as a trade route, into a fortified site that dominated the north of their territories, controlling the Elbe above Pirna, and an outpost of strategically important Dohna Castle located in the nearby Müglitz.

After the king and later emperor, Charles IV had Eulau Castle, which dominated the southern region, destroyed in 1348 by townsfolk from Aussig, he spent from 5 to 19 August 1359 on the Königstein and signed the authority for shipping rights. The castle was pledged several times in the 50 years that followed, including to the Donins. Because this family were enemies of the margraves of Meißen, the latter finally captured the castle in 1408 during the Dohna Feud that had been raging since 1385. But not until 25 April 1459 was the transfer of the castle to the Margraviate of Meißen finally completed once the Saxon-Bohemian border had been settled in the Treaty of Eger. Unlike the other rock castles in Saxon Switzerland the Königstein continued to be used by the Saxon dukes and prince-electors for military purposes. At one stage the Königstein was also a monastery. In 1516, Duke George the Bearded, a fierce opponent of the Reformation, founded a Celestine abbey on the Königstein, the Kloster des Lobes der Wunder Mariae. It closed again in 1524 - after the death of Duke George, Saxony became Evangelical.

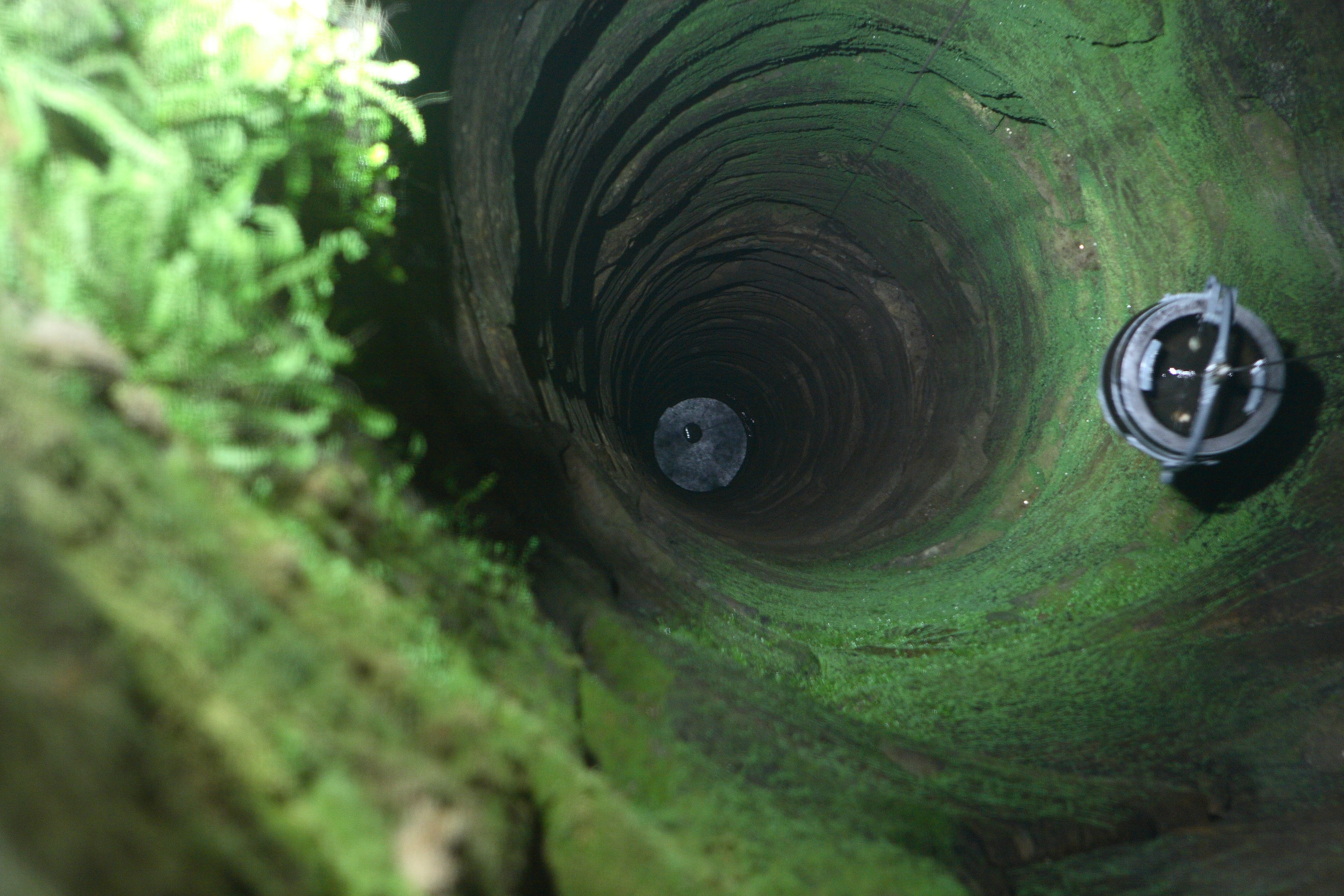
Well of Königstein Fortress

It is probable that there had been a stone castle on the Königstein as early as the 12th century. The oldest surviving structure today is the castle chapel built at the turn of the 13th century. In the years 1563 to 1569 the 152.5 metre deep well was bored into the rock within the castle - until that point the garrison of the Königstein had to obtain water from cisterns and by collecting rainwater. During the construction of the well some 8 cubic metres of water had to be removed from the shaft every day.

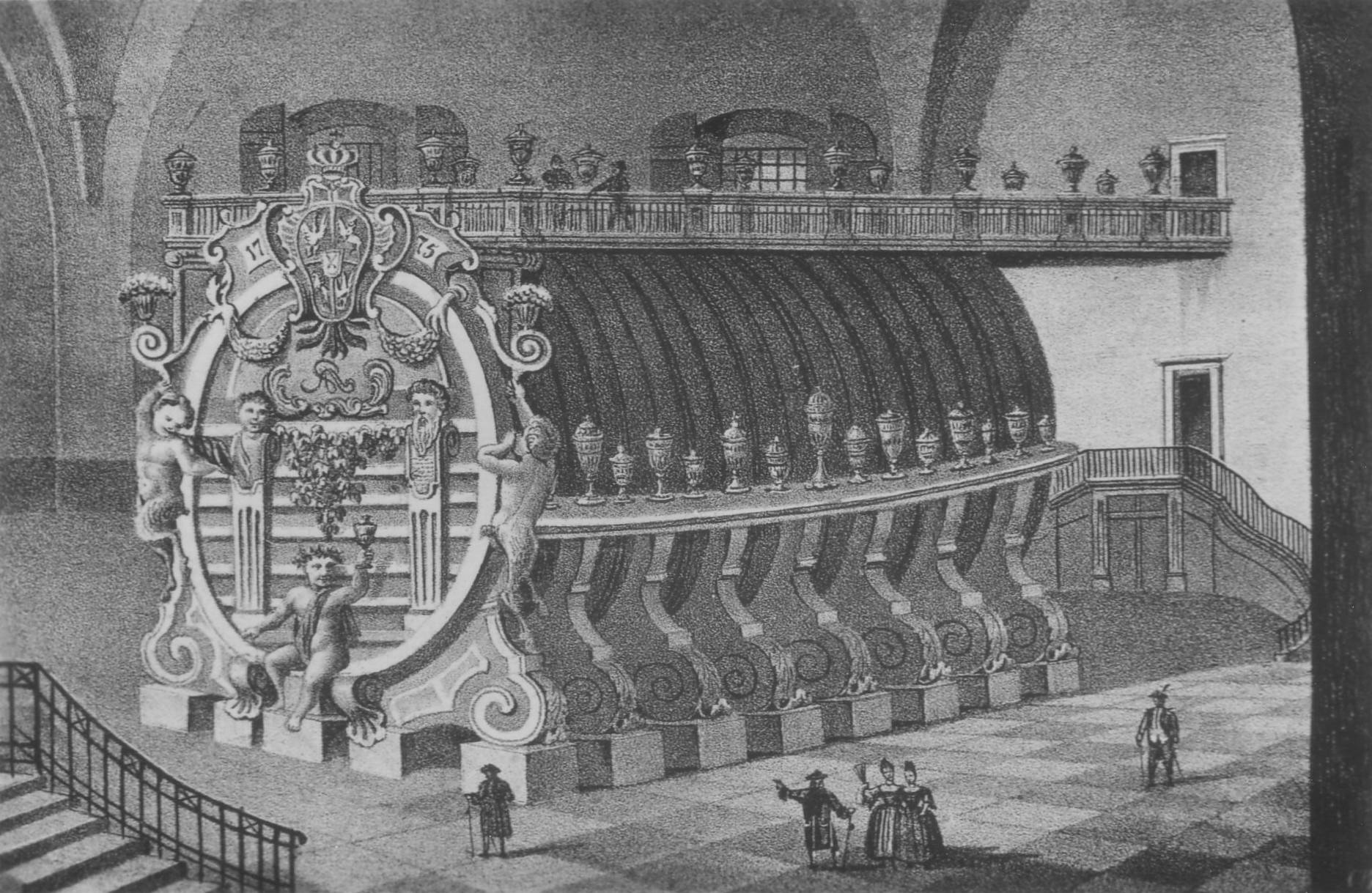
The Giant Königstein wine barrel

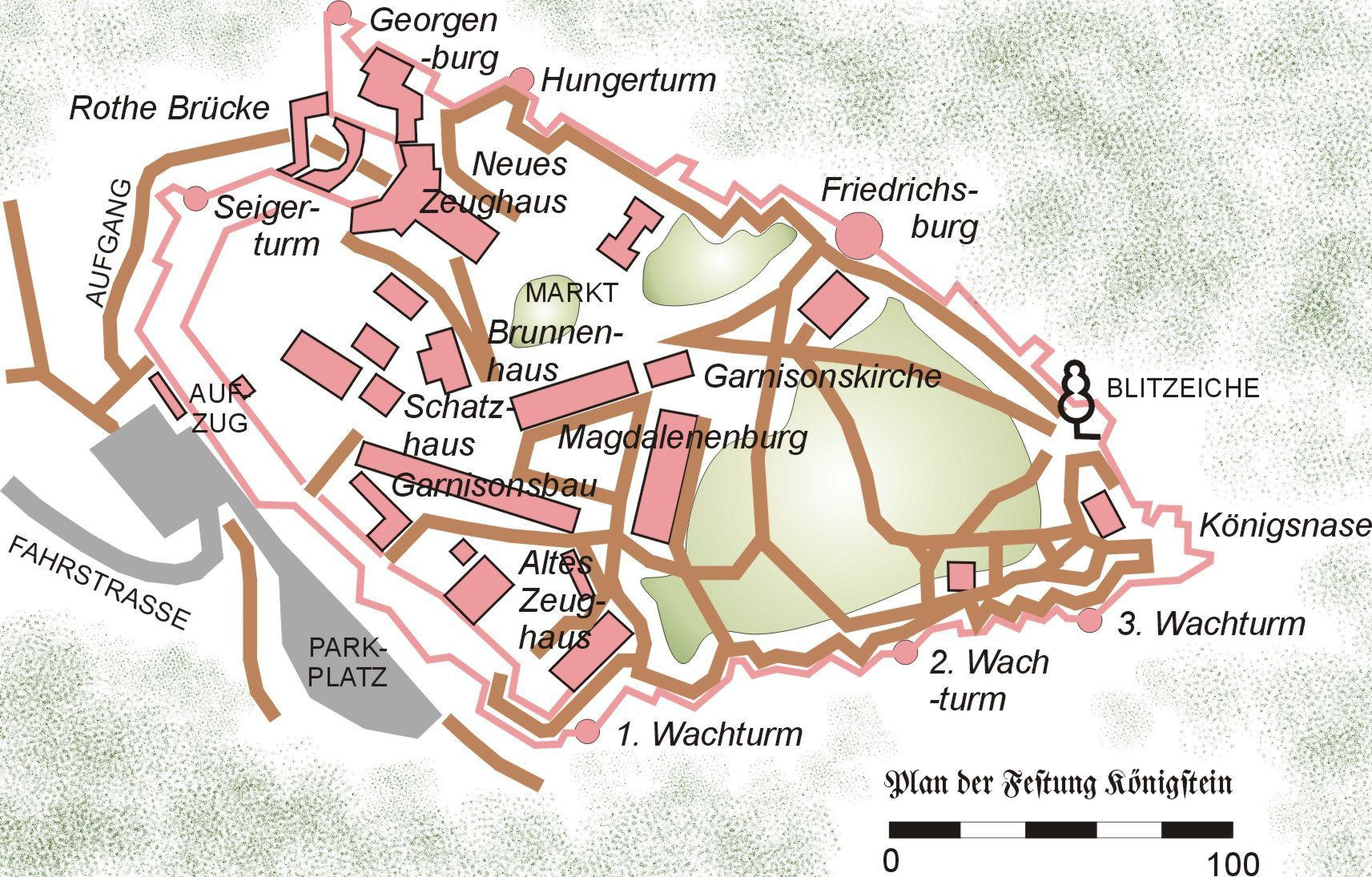
Plan of Königstein Fortress today

Between 1589 and 1591/97 Prince-Elector Christian I of Saxony and his successor had the castle developed into the strongest fortification in Saxony. The hitherto very jagged table hill was now surrounded with high walls. Buildings were erected, including the Gatehouse (Torhaus), the Streichwehr, the Old Barracks (Alte Kaserne), the Christiansburg (Friedrichsburg) and the Old Armoury (Altes Zeughaus). The second construction period followed from 1619 to 1681, during which inter alia the John George Bastion (Johann-Georgenbastion) was built in front of the Johann-Georgenburg. The third construction period is seen as the time from 1694 to 1756, which included the expansion of the Old Barracks. From 1722 to 1725, at the behest of August the Strong, coopers under Böttger built the enormous Königstein Wine Barrel (Königsteiner Weinfass), the greatest wine barrel in the world, in the cellar of the Magdalenenburg which had a capacity of 249,838 litres. It cost 8,230 thalers, 18 groschen and 9 pfennigs. The butt, which was once completely filled with country wine from the Meißen vineyards, had to be removed again in 1818 due to its poor condition. Because of Böttger, Königstein Fortress is also the site where European porcelain started.

Even after the expansion during those periods of time there continued to be modifications and additions on the extensive plateau. St. John's Hall (Johannissaal) built in 1631 was converted in 1816 into the New Armoury (Neues Zeughaus). In 1819 the Magdalenenburg castle was turned into a provisions magazine that was fortified to withstand bombardment. The old provisions store became a barracks. The Treasury (Schatzhaus) was built from 1854 to 1855. After the fortress had been incorporated in 1871 into the fortification system of the new German Empire, battery ramparts (Batteriewälle) were constructed from 1870 to 1895 with eight firing points, that were to have provided all-round defence for the fortress in case of an attack that, in the event, never came. This was at this time that the last major building work was done on the fortress.

Because Königstein Fortress was regarded as unconquerable, the Saxon monarchs retreated to it from Wittenberg and later Dresden during times of crisis and also deposited the state treasure and many works of art from the famous Zwinger here; it was also used as a country retreat due to its lovely surroundings.

== Military significance ==
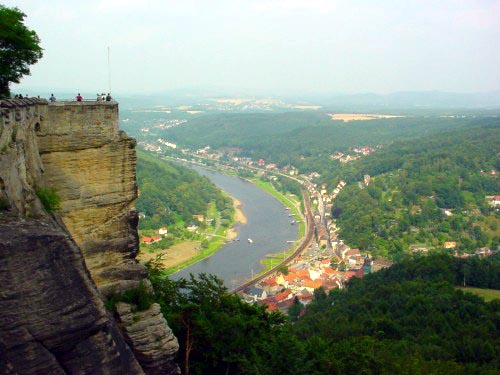
View from the fortress of the village of Königstein and the Elbe with the so-called Königsnase ("King's Nose") at the left of the picture

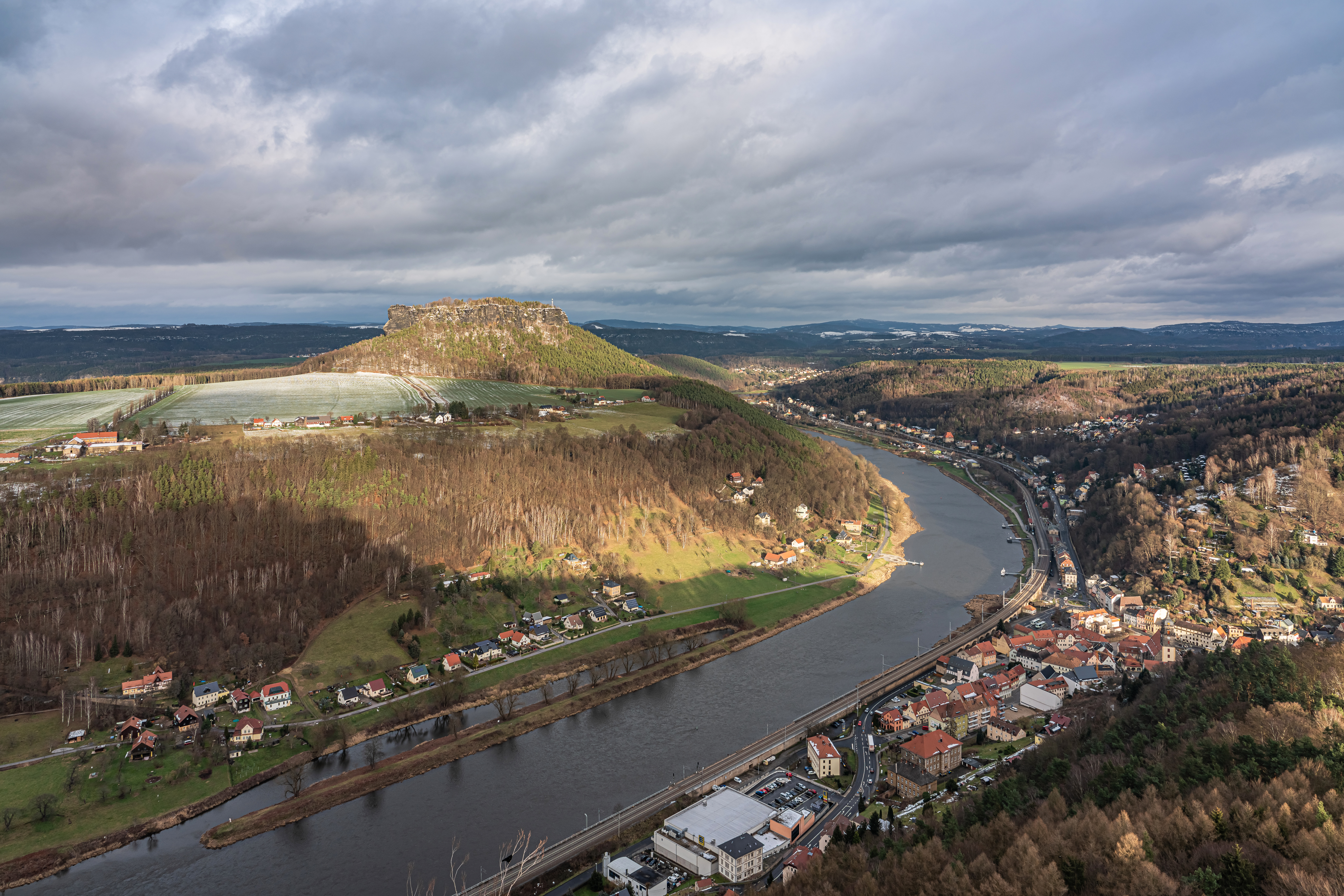
View from the fortress of the Elbe and the Lilienstein

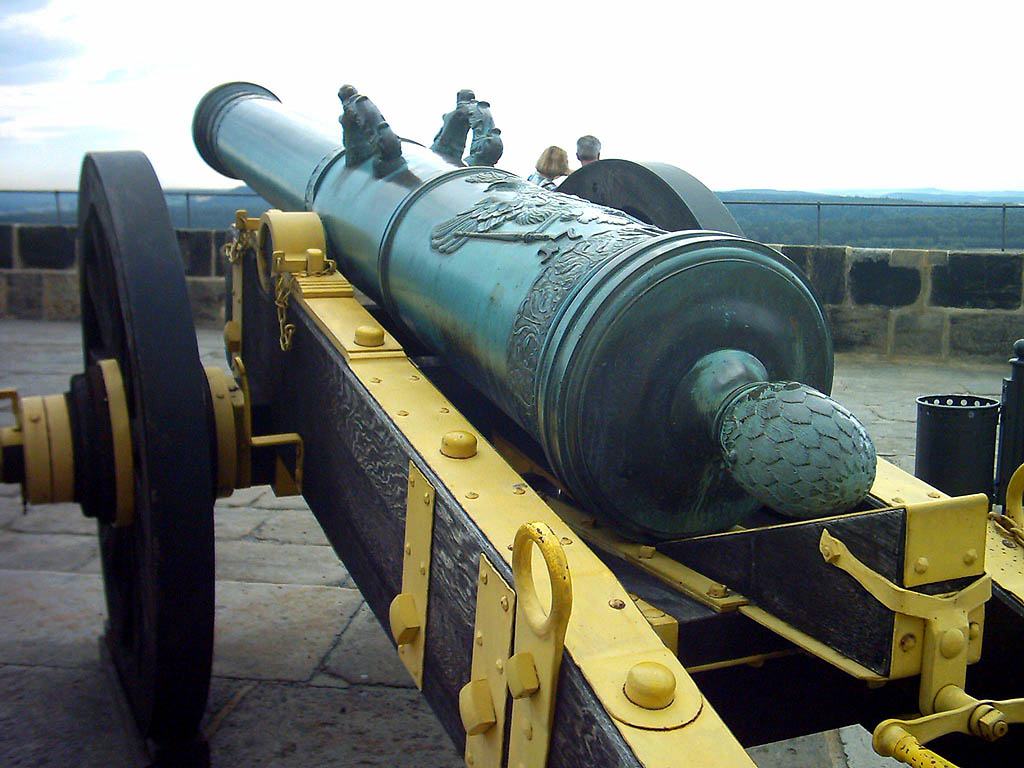
Quarter cannon on a gun carriage

The fortress played an important role in the History of Saxony, albeit less as a result of military action. The Saxon Dukes and Prince-Electors used the fortress primarily as a secure refuge during times of war, as a hunting lodge and maison de plaisance, but also as a dreaded state prison. Its actual military significance was rather marginal, although generals such as John Everard of Droste and Zützen (1662–1726) commanded it. For example, Prince-Elector Frederick Augustus II could only watch helplessly from the Königstein during the Seven Years' War, when right at the start of the war in 1756 his army surrendered without a fight to the Prussian Army at the foot of the Lilienstein on the other side of the Elbe. The commandant of the fortress from 1753 was the electoral Saxon Lieutenant General, Michael Lorenz von Pirch. In August 1813 the clash at Krietzschwitz took place in front of its gates, an engagement that proved an important precursor to the Battle of Kulm and the Battle of Leipzig. In October 1866 Alexander von Rohrscheidt (1808–1881) was nominated as commandant of the fortress. It lost its military value with the development of long-range guns at the beginning of the 19th century. The last commandant of Königstein Fortress was Lieutenant Colonel Heinicke who commanded it until 1913. The fortress had to guard the Saxon state reserves and secret archives during times of war. In 1756 and 1813 Dresden's art treasures were also stored at the Königstein. During the Second World War the large casemates of the fortress were also used for such purposes.

The fortress was never conquered, it had too much of a chilling reputation after it had been expanded by Elector Christian I. Only the chimney sweep, Sebastian Abratzky, managed to climb the vertical sandstone walls in 1848. The Abratzky Chimney (Abratzky-Kamin) named after him is a grade IV (based on the Saxon system) climbing route that may still be climbed today. Because climbing over the wall is banned, climbers must abseil down the adjacent wall again after climbing it.

== Use as a prison ==
Until 1922 the fortress was the best-known state prison in Saxony. During the Franco-Prussian War and the two world wars the fortress was also used as a prisoner of war camp. In World War I the castle was used as a prisoner of war camp (Oflag) for French and Russian officers. In World War II it again served as an Oflag, called Oflag IV-B, for British, French, Polish and other Allied officers. ·

After the Second World War the Red Army used the fortress as a military hospital. From 1949 to 1955 it was used as a so-called Jugendwerkhof for the reeducation of delinquent youths and those who did not fit the image of a socialist society.

Some of the more notable prisoners incarcerated at Königstein are given below (dates of imprisonment in parentheses):

- the Crypto-Calvinists, including Caspar Peucer (1574–86) and Nikolaus Krell (1591–1601), chancellor of the Electorate of Saxony
- Count Wolf Dietrich von Beichlingen (1703–1709), great chancellor and senior court-marshal of the Electorate of Saxony
- Franz Conrad Romanus (1705–1746), Bürgermeister of Leipzig
- Johann Friedrich Böttger (1706–1707), co-discoverer with Tschirnhaus of European porcelain
- Johann Reinhold von Patkul (1706–1707), Livonian statesman
- Count Karl Heinrich von Hoym (1734–1736), cabinet minister of the Electorate of Saxony; committed suicide in his cell
- Mikhail Bakunin (1849–1850), Russian anarchist and revolutionary
- August Bebel (1872–1874), German politician, president of the SPD, founder of German social democracy
- Thomas Theodor Heine (1899), caricaturist and artist
- Frank Wedekind (1899–1900), writer and dramatist
- Henri Giraud (1940–1942), French general; successfully escaped from the castle
- Bertrand Fagalde (1940-1945), French general; captured just after the Battle of Dunkirk

Königstein was never taken, not even during World War II. However, on 17 April 1942, French General Henri Giraud successfully escaped German captivity from the castle.

== Military history open-air museum ==
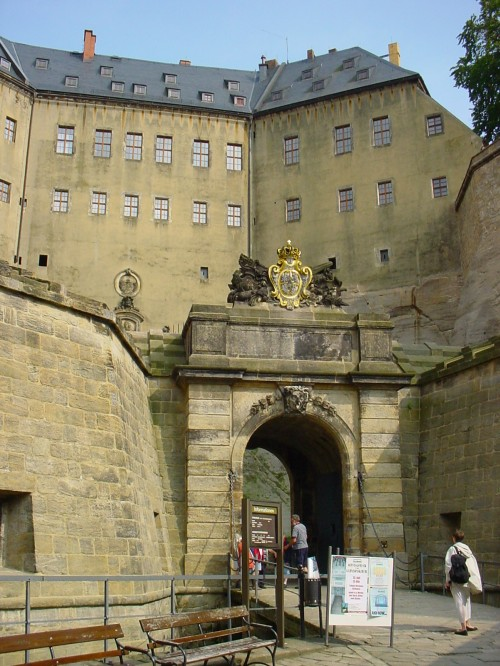
Entranceway

Since 29 May 1955, the fortress has been an open-air, military history museum of popular with tourists. The museum has been managed as a satellite of the Bundeswehr Military History Museum in Dresden since 1990.

In the years 1967 to 1970, a lift was built at the foot of the access path for 42 people. A second lift was built in 2005 against a vertical wall of the fortress, which transports up to 18 passengers in a lift with a panoramic view to a height of about 42 metres. The state of Saxony made 1.7 million euros available for the project. The lift opened Easter 2006.

Between 1991 and 2010, a total of about 46 million euros was invested by the Free State of Saxony on the renovation and upgrade of Königstein Fortress. The museum welcomed its 25 millionth visitor on 14 October 2005 since it opened Whitsun 1955.

Visitor numbers decreased somewhat from about 1,000,000 in 1999 to 446,000 in 2010.

== The fortress in art ==
Around 1756, Elector Augustus III commissioned the Italian artist Bernardo Bellotto to paint a series of five large-scale views of the fortress at Königstein. The canvasses were never delivered to the Elector due to the hostilities of the Seven Years' War and were eventually exported to Great Britain. Today, four of the Königstein paintings are held in public collections in Britain: The Fortress of Königstein from the North is in the National Gallery; The Fortress of Königstein from the South is at Knowsley Hall, Merseyside; and both The Fortress of Königstein: Courtyard with the Brunnenhaus and The Fortress of Königstein: Courtyard with the Magdalenenburg, hang in the Manchester Art Gallery. The fifth canvas, The Fortress of Königstein from the North-West, is now in the United States, on display in the National Gallery of Art in Washington D.C.

In Anthony Trollope's novel Phineas Redux, it is during an excursion to Königstein, "the fortress constructed on that wonderful rock," that the hero, Phineas Finn, learns from his first love, who had refused his offer of marriage, that she had in fact always loved him, and continues to.

== Gallery ==
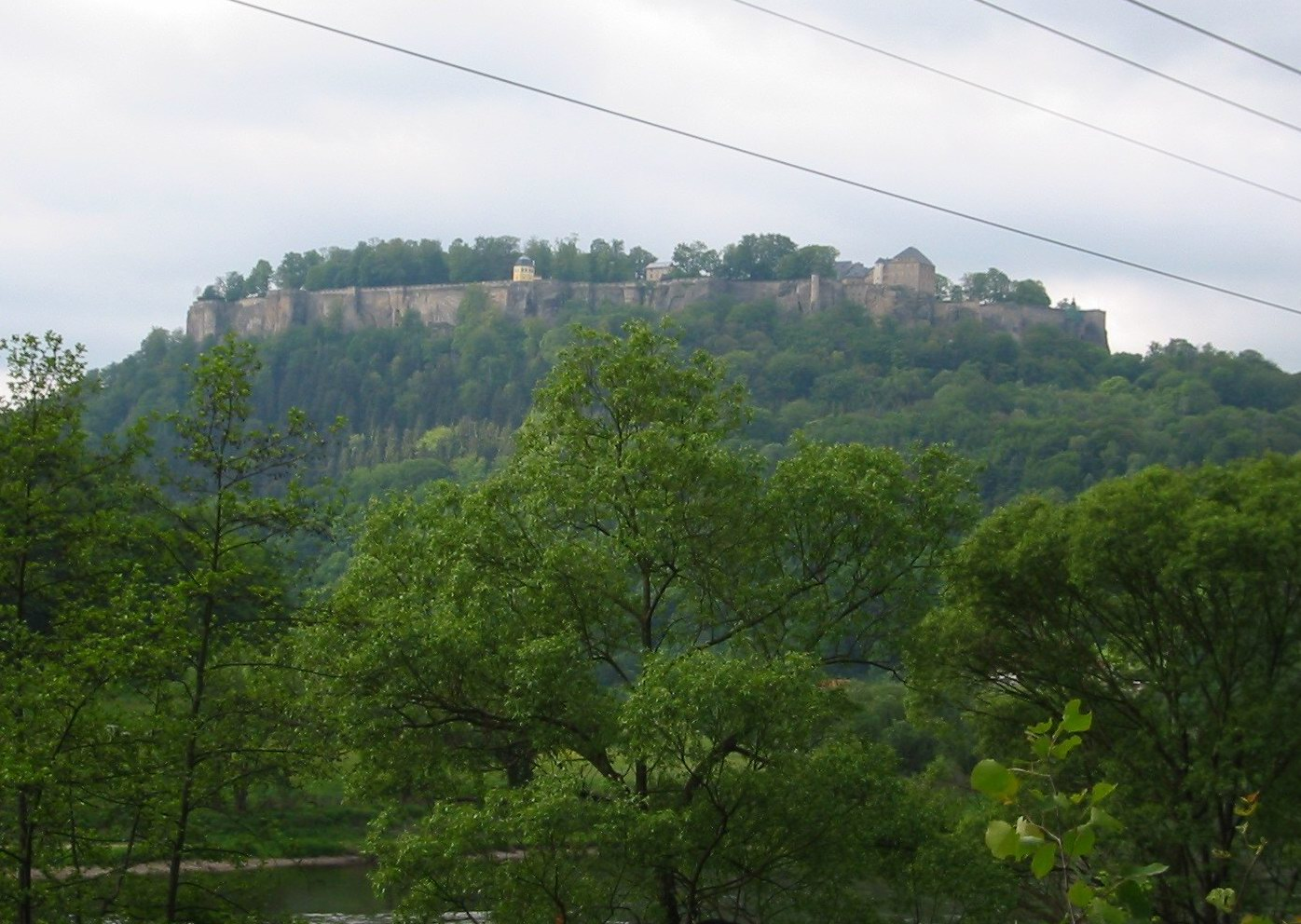
View from the river Elbe to the fortress

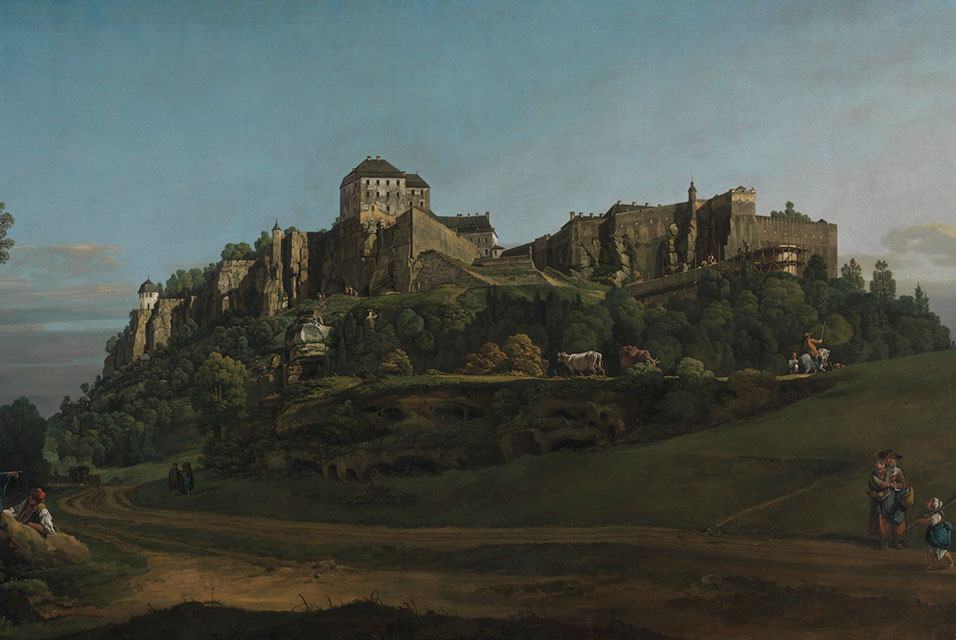
Bellotto's The Fortress of Königstein from the North (National Gallery, London)

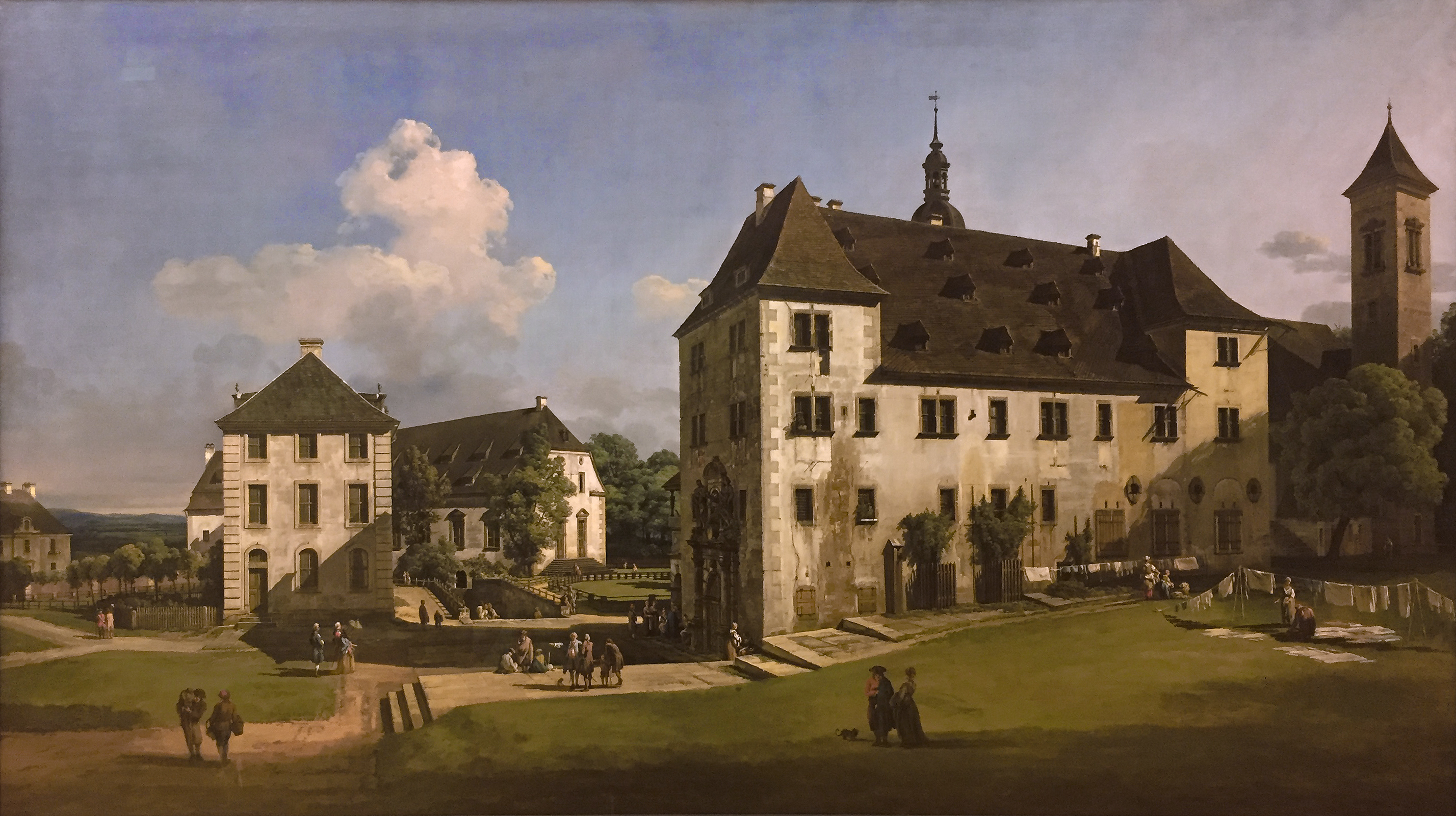
Bellotto's Courtyard of the Castle At Königstein from the South (Manchester Art Gallery)

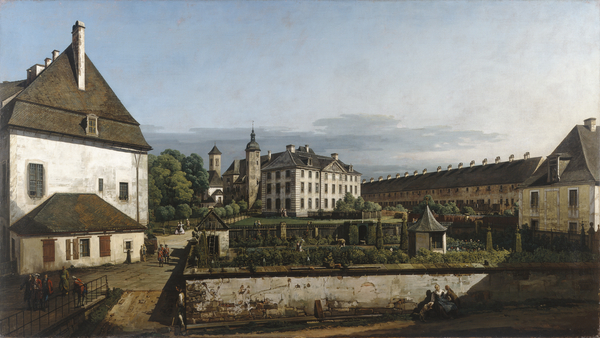
The Fortress of Königstein Courtyard with the Brunnenhaus (Manchester Art Gallery)

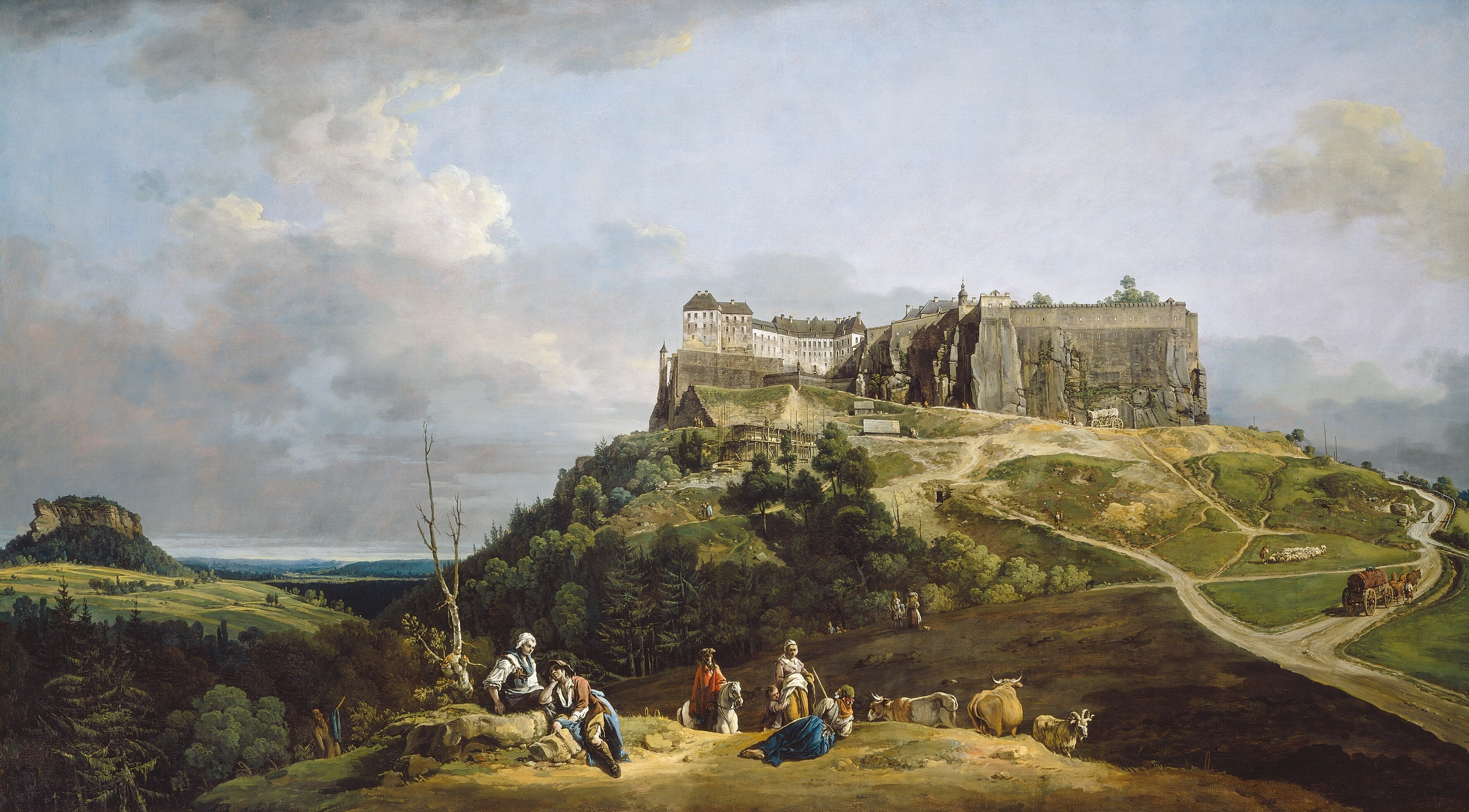
Bellotto's, The Fortress of Königstein from the North-West (National Gallery of Art, Washington)
