= Sophie of Saxony, Duchess of Pomerania =

Sophie of Saxony
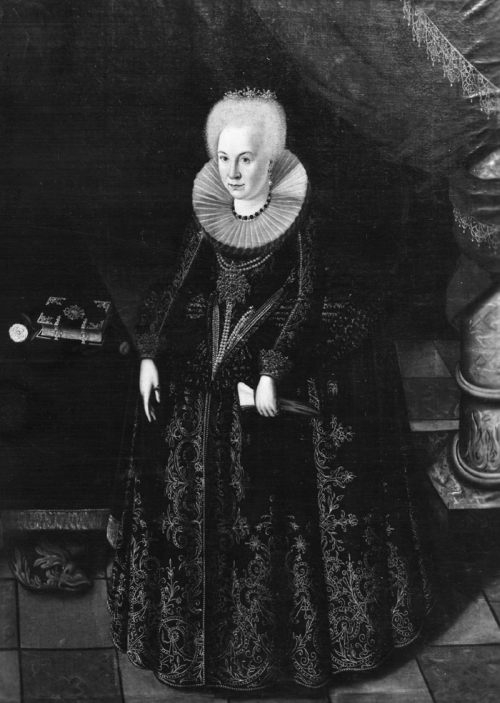
- Portrait c. 1615
- Born: 29 April 1587; Dresden
- Died: 9 December 1635 (aged 48); Stettin
- Spouse: Francis, Duke of Pomerania
- House: House of Wettin
- Father: Christian I, Elector of Saxony
- Mother: Sophie of Brandenburg

Sophie of Saxony (29 April 1587 – 9 December 1635) was a member of the Albertine branch of the House of Wettin. She was a princess of Saxony by birth and by marriage a Duchess of Pomerania-Stettin.

== Life ==
Sophie was a daughter of the Elector Christian I of Saxony (1560–1591) from his marriage to Sophie (1568–1622), the daughter of Elector John George of Brandenburg.

On 26 August 1610, in Dresden, she married Duke Francis of Pomerania-Stettin (1577–1620). No children were born from this marriage. After Francis's death, Sophie received the city and district of Wolin as her wittum. She administered the district during the difficult years of the Thirty Years' War. Between 1622 and 1626, she built a new residence in Wolin, because the old Wolin Castle was rather dilapidated.

After her death, the district fell back to Duke Bogislaw XIV of Pomerania. However, all movable property, such as furniture and the grain stocks, were confiscated by the Swedish army, because Sweden was at war with Saxony and Sweden considered her a Saxon.

Sophie was initially buried in the ducal crypt in Szczecin, but in 1650 her body was transferred to the Sophienkirche in Dresden.
