= Åke Henriksson Tott =

Swedish nobleman, soldier and politician (1598–1640)

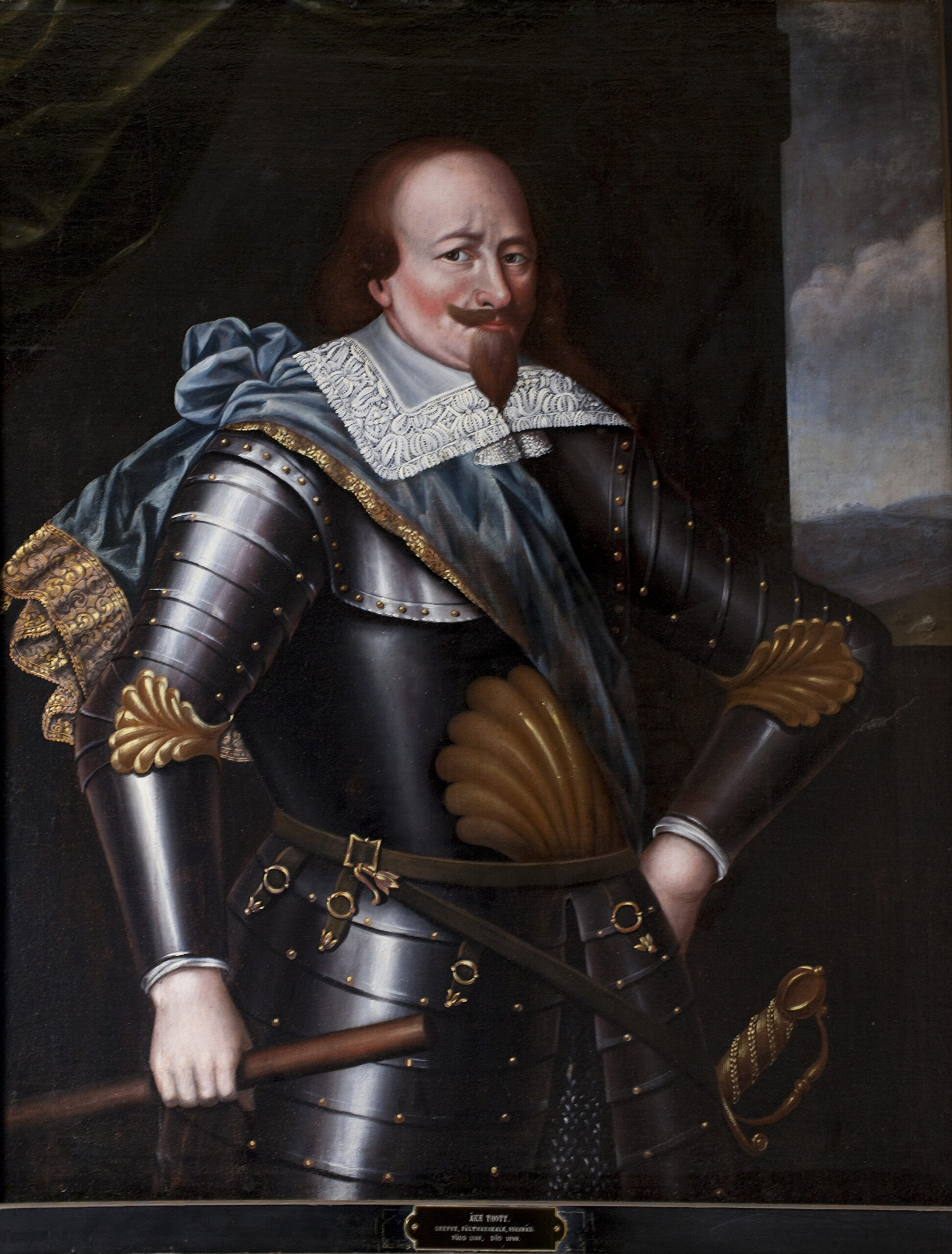
- Born: 4 June 1598; Gerknäs gård, Uusimaa, Finland
- Died: 14 July 1640 (aged 42); Lavila, Eurajoki
- Burial place: Turku Cathedral
- Spouses: Sigrid Bielke (m. 1628) Christina Brahe (m. 1638)
- Children: Clas Åkesson Tott the Younger
- Military career
- Allegiance: Sweden
- Branch: Cavalry
- Service years: 1613–1632
- Rank: Field Marshal (Fältmarskalk)
- Conflicts: Thirty Years' War; Battle of Grebin; Battle of Breitenfeld (1631)

Åke Henriksson Tott (or Achatius Tott; 4 June 1598 – 14 July 1640) was a Swedish nobleman, soldier and politician. His estates included Ekolsund in Sweden, Sjundby in Finland, Polchow in Swedish Pomerania and Lihula in Swedish Livonia.

He was born in Lohja to Princess Sigrid of Sweden and nobleman Henrik Klasson Tott. He was appointed Privy Councilor in 1630, and Field Marshal in 1631.

In the Thirty Years' War (1618–1648), he commanded troops at the Battle of Grebin, in 1627 and the Battle of Breitenfeld, in 1631. King Gustavus Adolphus of Sweden is said to have called him "the snow plow, who is going to clear the path for the rest".

He married Sigrid Bielke, and fathered

- Clas Åkesson Tott the Younger (1630-1674), Swedish Field Marshal,
- Åke Henrik Åkesson Tott, died in infancy.

== Gallery ==
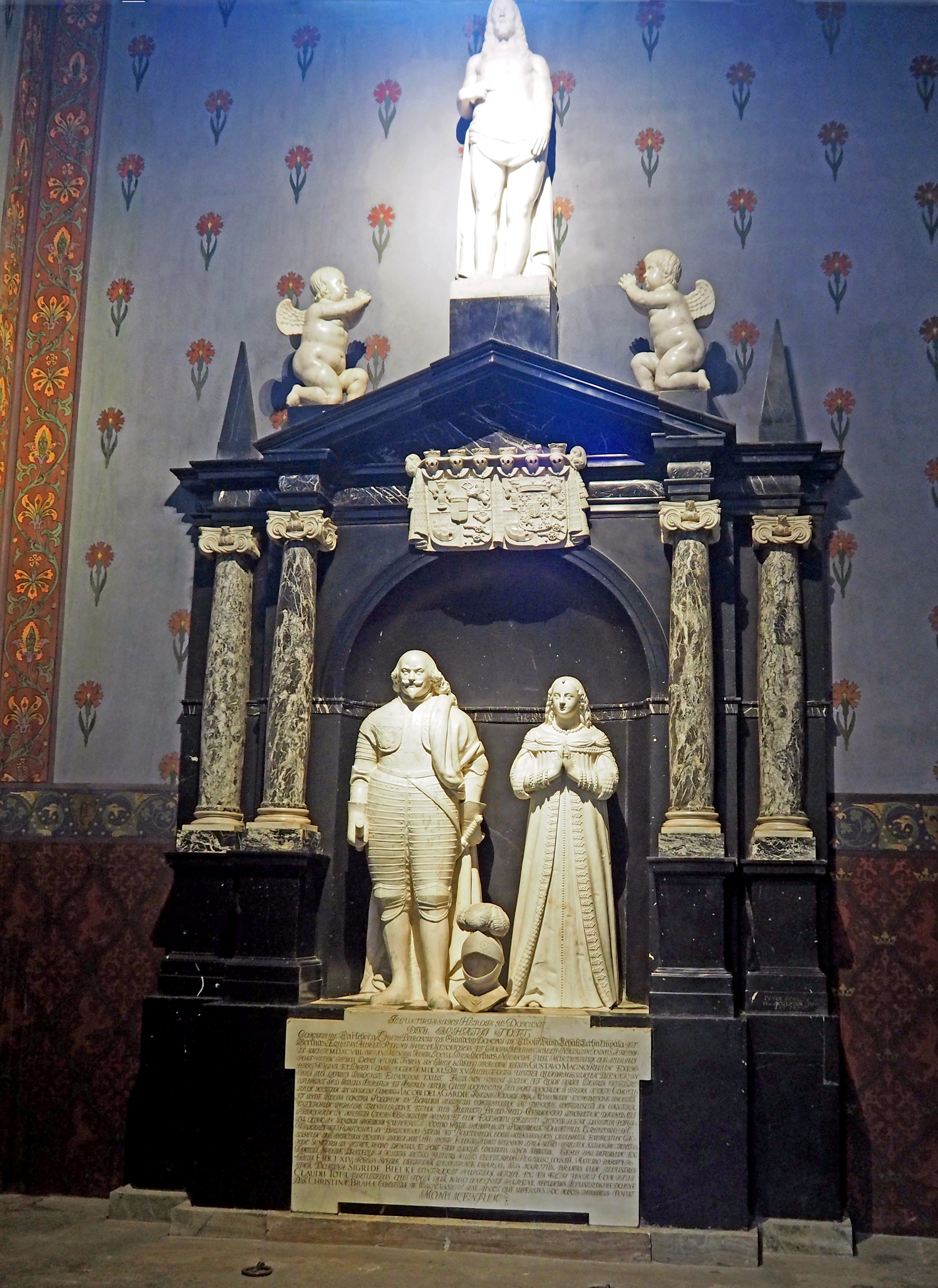
Åke Henriksson Tott's tomb in the Cathedral of Turku

== See also ==
Hakkapeliitta
