= Wolin Castle =

Demolished castle in Wolin, Poland

- Wolin in Poland
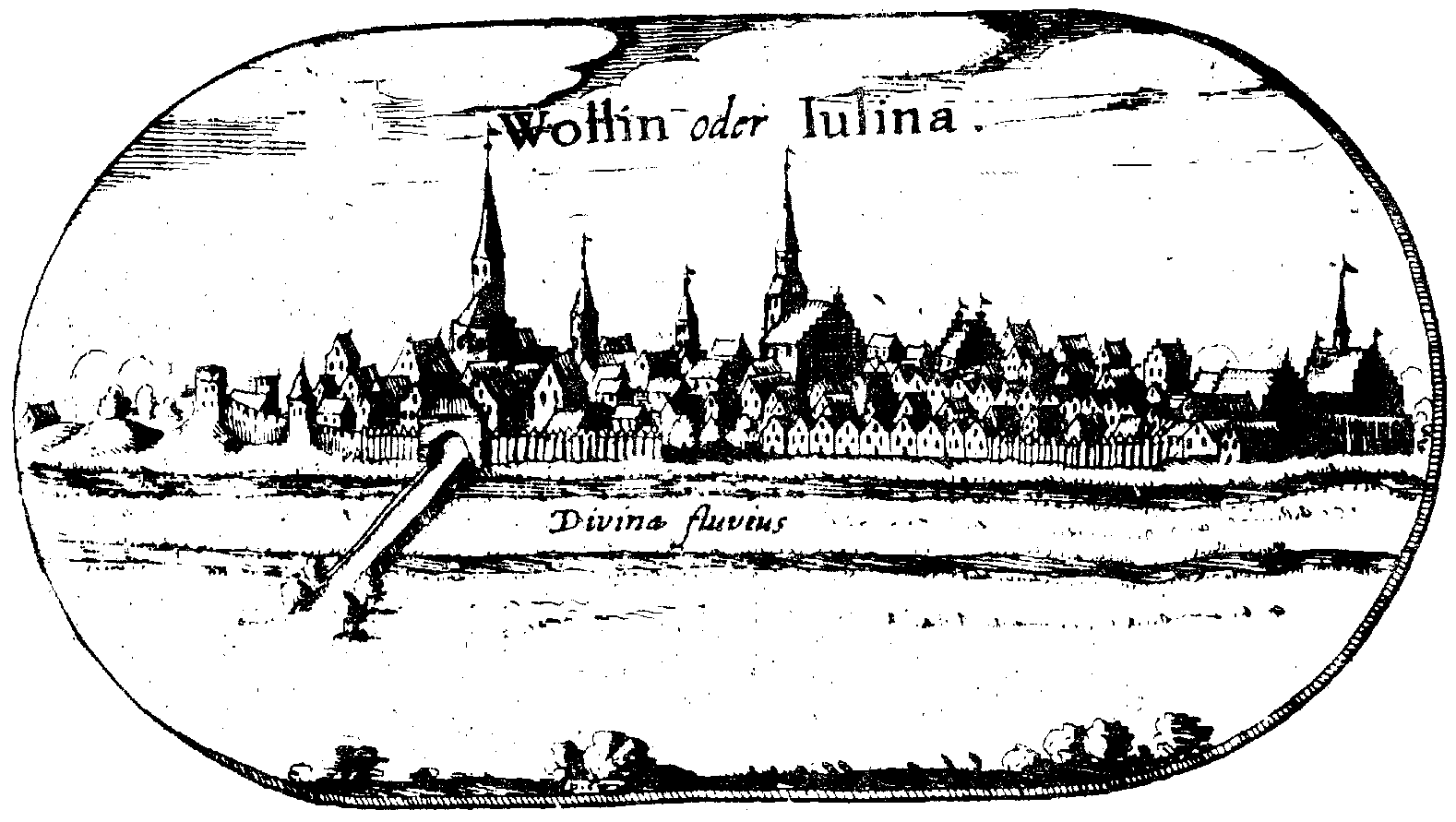
- Wolin Castle at the right edge of a vista on the Map of Lubinus

Site information
- Type: Castle
- Condition: Demolished

Location
- Coordinates: 53°50′40.8″N 14°36′58.8″E

Site history
- Built: before 1284
- Demolished: 1675

Wolin Castle was a castle in the town Wolin on the island also named Wolin (in Poland), owned by the dukes of Pomerania.

== History ==
When bishop Otto of Bamberg made his missionary journeys through Pomerania in the early 12th century, he was already received in Wilin in a fortified royal house. Wardens managed a wooden building and the castle district of the town into the 13th century. By then, the house was the seat of Pribislaw I, Lord of Parchim-Richenberg, an early prince in Mecklenburg. After the death of his son Pribislaw II, the Duke's reeves administered Wolin. The castle is first mentioned as castrum Wolyn in a document dated 1284.

The wooden building was torn down and a stone caste was built in its place. The complex including, among other buildings, stables, a granary, a brewery and the administrative office. During the existence of the Duchy of Pomerania, the stone castle repeatedly served as a widow seat of the Pomeranian duchesses or as a residence for non-ruling members of the House of Griffins, such as Barnim XI in his younger years. At other times, a captain lived in the main building.

Philip Hainhofer, who accompanied Duke Philip II on a longish journey in 1617, left a description of the castle in his diary. According to him the old building, where the duchess Anna Maria of Brandenburg had her widow seat from 1603 to 1618, provided accommodation for at most ten courtiers. Portraits of princes decorated the great hall. At around the same time, a vista of Wolin was drawn, which is reproduced on the edge of the Map of Lubinus. This shows, on the right side, a building with a rectangular ground plan, decorated with a crow-stepped gable and a flèche with a copper roof and a striking turret clock.

In 1620, Wolin Castle was meant to serve as the widow seat for Sophie of Saxony, the widow of Duke Francis, but it was in such a bad shape, that it had to be demolished and replaced by a new castle in the same place. Several outbuildings were damaged in the great city fire of 1628. When an inventory was taken in 1636, after Duchess Sophie's death, a brick building with an unfinished interior was found. The adjacent former monastery church was used as a granary.

The House of Griffins died out during the Thirty Years' War, and the castle came into the possession of the Swedish governor Johan Banér (1596–1641), whose heirs ceded it to the Swedish queen dowager Maria Eleonora. Her daughter, Queen Christina of Sweden sold castle and district of Wolin in 1654 to Count Clas Tott (1630–1674), who mortgaged it in 1655 — the legality of this was confirmed in 1657 — to Count Christoph Karl von Schlippenbach (1624–1660).

The castle was badly damaged by Brandenburger and Imperial troops during the siege and storming of Wolin in 1659, in the context of the Second Northern War. The castle burned down in 1675 when Wolin was again conquered by Brandenburg, in the context of the Great Northern War, and was never rebuilt.
