= Christian I of Saxony =

Elector of Saxony from 1586 to 1591

Christian I
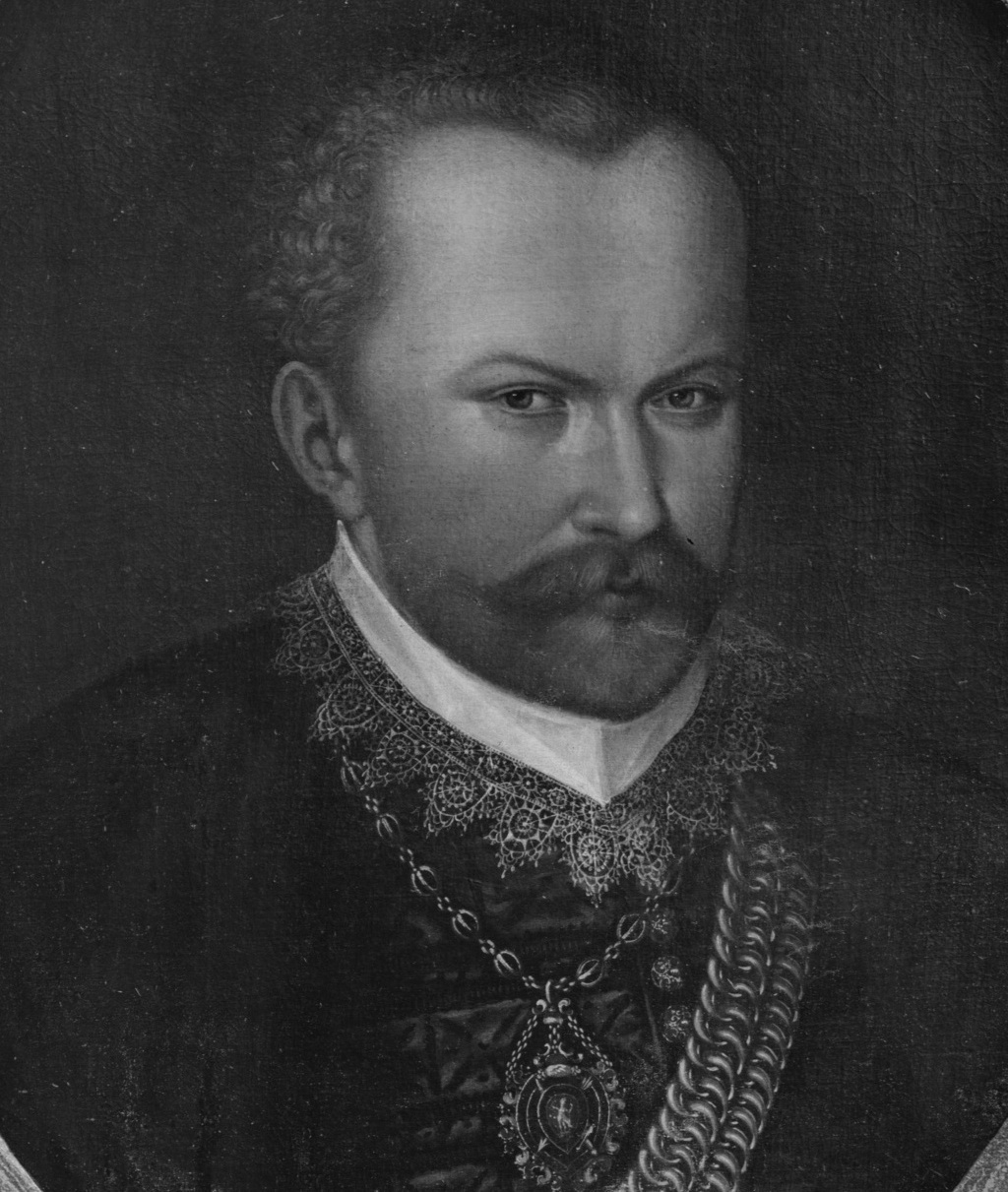

Elector of Saxony
- Reign: 11 February 1586 – 25 September 1591
- Predecessor: Augustus I
- Successor: Christian II
- Born: 29 October 1560; Dresden, Electorate of Saxony, Holy Roman Empire
- Died: 25 September 1591 (aged 30); Dresden, Electorate of Saxony, Holy Roman Empire
- Burial: Freiberg Cathedral
- Spouse: Sophie of Brandenburg (m. 1582)
- Issue Detail: Christian II, Elector of Saxony; John George I, Elector of Saxony; Sophie, Duchess of Pomerania; Prince Augustus; Dorothea, Abbess of Quedlinburg
- House: Wettin (Albertine line)
- Father: Augustus I, Elector of Saxony
- Mother: Anna of Denmark
- Religion: Lutheran

Christian I of Saxony (29 October 1560 – 25 September 1591) was Elector of Saxony from 1586 to 1591. He belonged to the Albertine branch of the House of Wettin.

He was the sixth but second surviving son of Augustus, Elector of Saxony and Anna of Denmark. The death of his older brother, Alexander (8 October 1565), made him the new heir apparent to the Electorate of Saxony.

Christian succeeded his father when he died, in 1586. His chancellor was Nikolaus Krell. During his reign, the first measurement was made of the Electorate of Saxony by Matthias Oeder. Later, the work of Oeder was continued by Balthasar Zimmermann until 1633 and completed as far as possible.

In 1591 his wife organised a set of 12 suits of armour that she planned to give him as a Christmas present. A number of the suits survive.

== Family ==
In Dresden on 25 April 1582, Christian married Sophie, daughter of John George, Elector of Brandenburg. They had seven children:

1. Christian II (b. Dresden, 23 September 1583 – d. Dresden, 23 June 1611), successor of his father as Elector.
2. John George I (b. Dresden, 5 March 1585 – d. Dresden, 8 October 1656), successor of his brother as Elector.
3. Anna Sabine (b. Dresden, 25 January 1586 – d. Dresden, 24 March 1586) died in infancy.
4. Sophie (b. Dresden, 29 April 1587 – d. Stettin, 9 December 1635), married on 26 August 1610 to Duke Francis I of Pomerania.
5. Elisabeth (b. Dresden, 21 July 1588 – d. Dresden, 4 March 1589) died in infancy.
6. Augustus (b. Dresden, 7 September 1589 – d. Naumburg, 26 December 1615), married on 1 January 1612 to Elisabeth of Brünswick-Wolfenbüttel. This marriage was childless.
7. Dorothea (b. Dresden, 7 January 1591 – d. Quedlinburg, 17 November 1617), Princess-Abbess of Quedlinburg (1610).

== Gallery ==
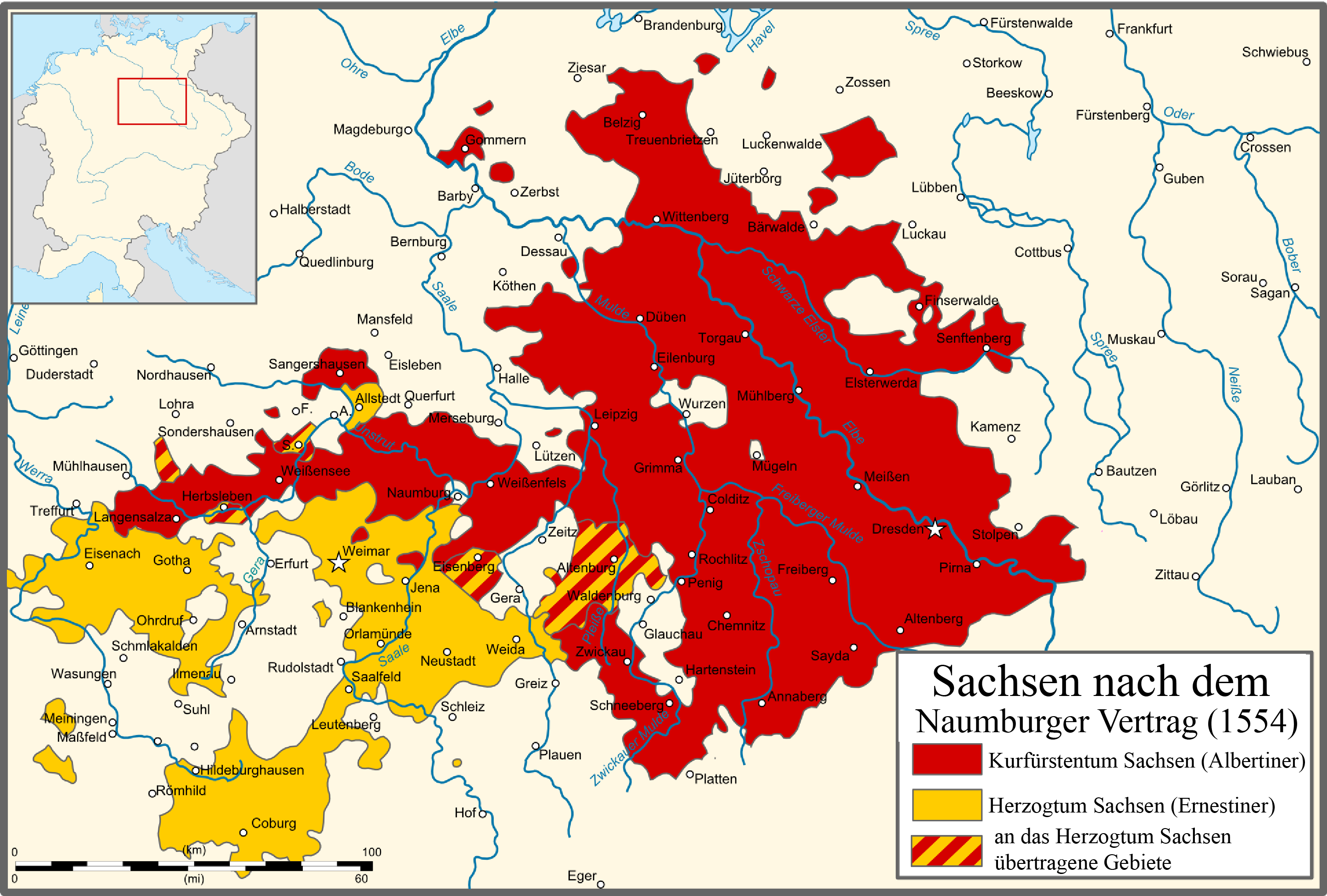
Albertine domains (red) in the second half of the 16th century upon the Treaty of Naumburg (1554)

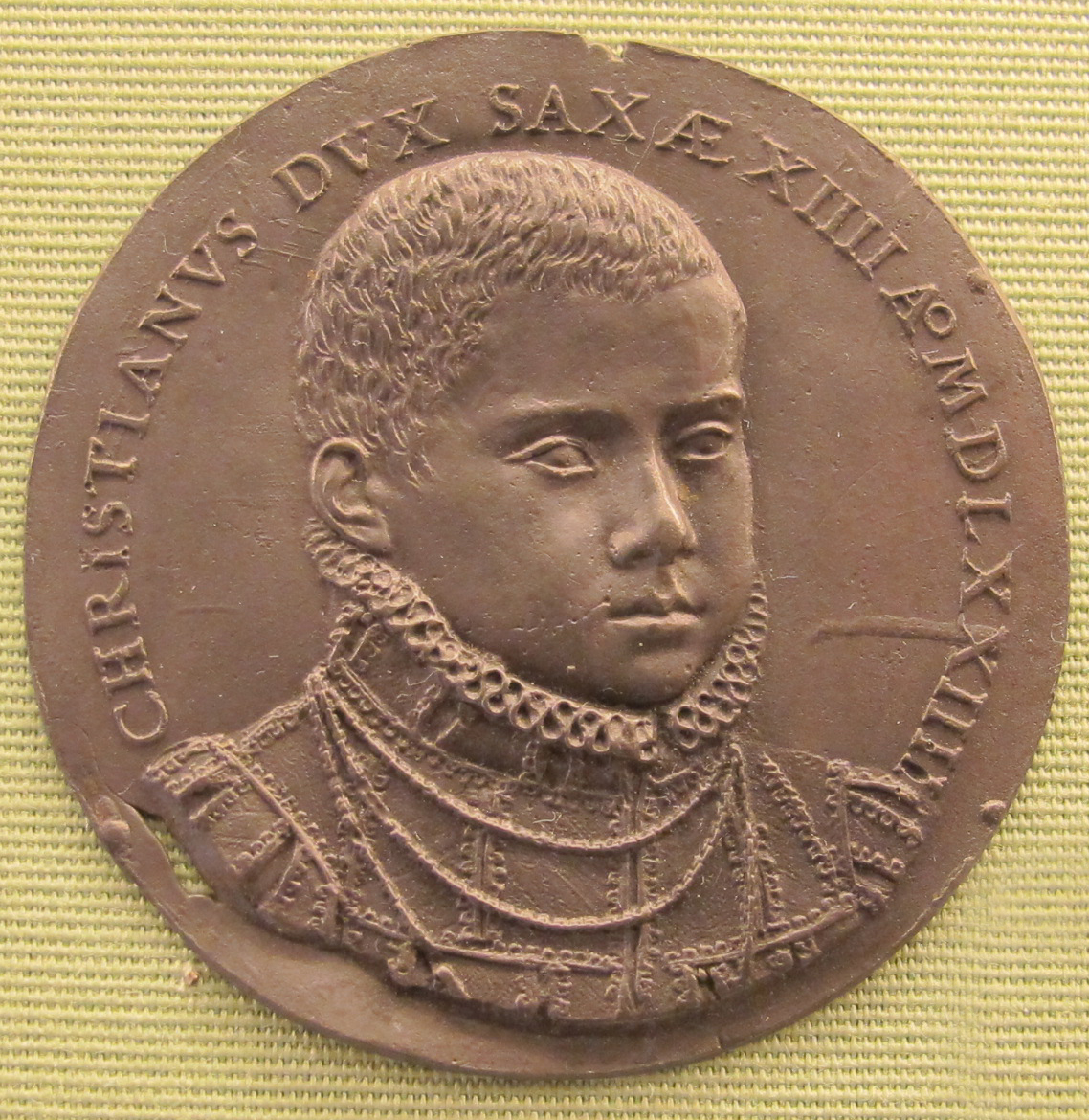
Christian of Saxony as a prince, medal (1574)

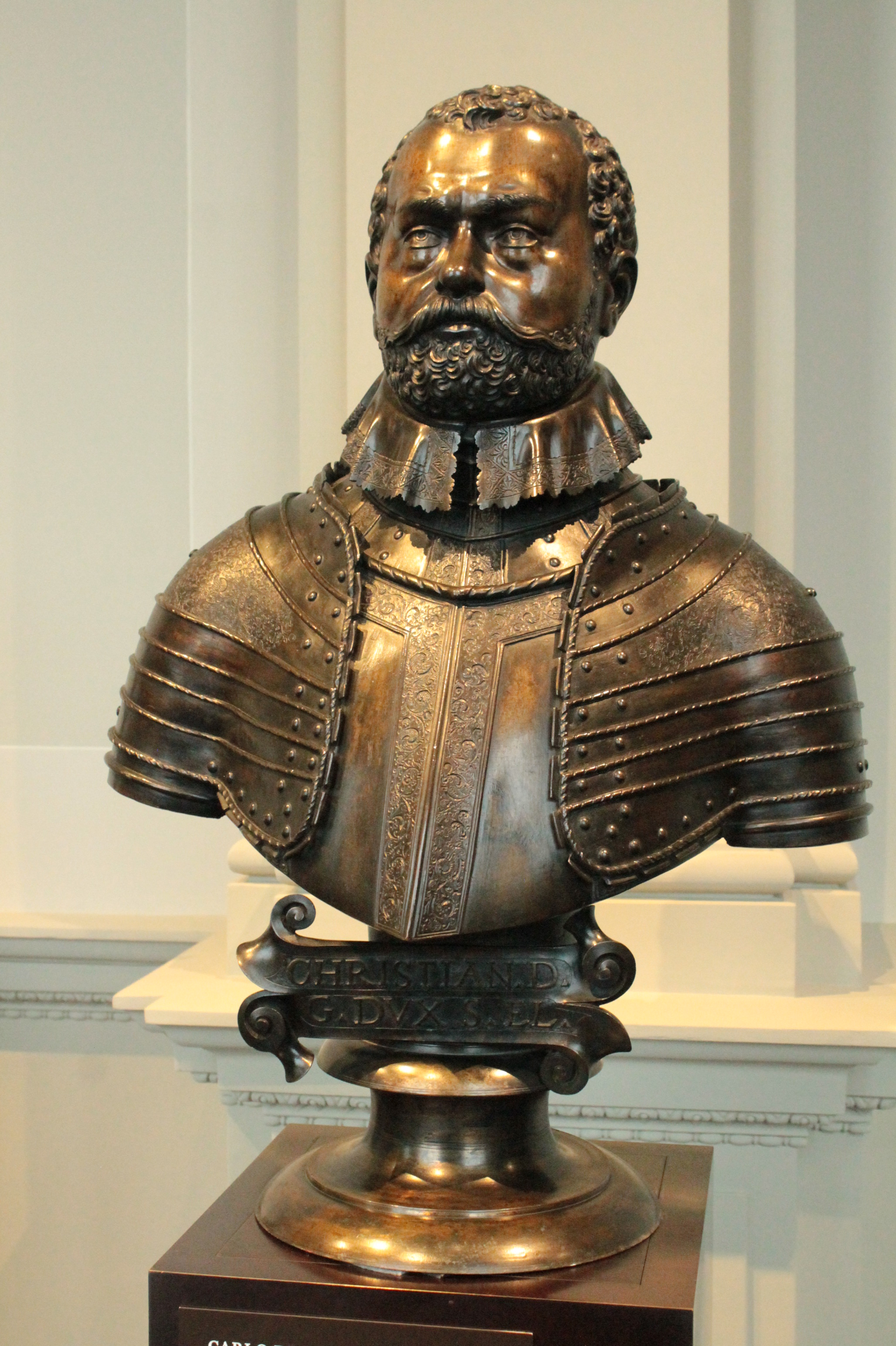
Christian I of Saxony by Carlo di Cesare del Palagio c.1610, Museom of Old Masters, Dresden

== Sources ==
- Christa Schille (1957). "Christian I.". Neue Deutsche Biographie (in German). Vol. 3. Berlin: Duncker & Humblot. pp. 230–231. (full text online).
- Ilse Schunke: Beitraege zur Politik des Kurfürsten Christian I. v. Sachsen 1586-1591 vornehmlich in den Jahren 1586/89, Munich, 1922 (in German)
- Groß, Reiner (2007). Die Wettiner. Stuttgart: Kohlhammer Verlag.
- Wilson, Peter (2016). Heart of Europe: A History of the Holy Roman Empire. Cambridge: Harvard University Press.

Christian I of Saxony House of Wettin Born: 29 October 1560 Died: 25 September 1591
Regnal titles
Preceded by Augustus	Elector of Saxony; 1586–1591	Succeeded by Christian II
