= Clas Åkesson Tott the Younger =

Swedish noble, Field marshal and statesman

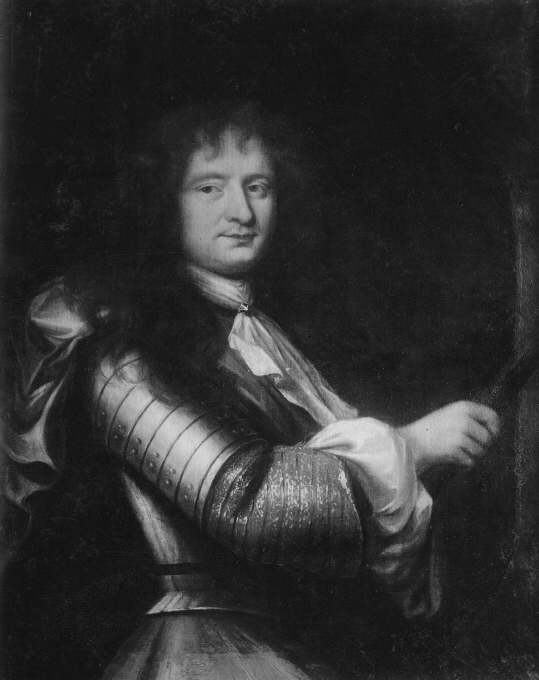
Clas Åkesson Tott the Younger by an unknown author

Count Clas Åkesson Tott, also Claes, Klaus, Claudius or Clas Åkesson Tott the Younger (Ekolsund Castle, 14 August 1630 – Paris, 12 July 1674) was a Swedish noble, Field marshal and statesman.

== Biography ==
Tott was the son of the Swedish Field marshal and politician Åke Henriksson Tott (1598–1640) and Sigrid Bielke (1607–1634). After spending a few years in France, he frequented Queen Christina's court in 1651. A year later, he was elevated to Count of Karleborg. In 1654, he was appointed Master of the Horse and received a seat in the Royal council. Before the queen abdicated, he was awarded with Wolin Castle.

After Christina's abdication, he joined the Swedish army in Charles X Gustav's Polish War (1655–1660), where he took part in several battles. He captured Neumarkt and Gebnitz and then routed 6,000 Polish troops in a battle. Promoted to major general, he led the Swedish vanguard in the Advance on Warsaw in 1656, where he was victorious in a skirmish against Lithuanian troops.

During the reign of Charles X Gustav, Clas Tott served for a time on a mission in Paris and then, during the Dano-Swedish War (1658–1660), he distinguished himself in the March Across the Belts (1658).

During the minority of Charles XI of Sweden, his career continued with two years as Ambassador in Paris (1662-63), and one year (1664) as Governor of Stockholm. In 1665 he was appointed Field marshal and in the same year as Governor-General of Swedish Livonia, where he remained for seven years. In 1672, Charles XI sent him again to Paris as Ambassador. He died in Paris two years later.

Clas Tott is buried in the Brahe burial chapel of Jäder Church. In 1665, he had married Anna Margareta Oxenstierna (1650–1672), daughter of the Swedish Chancellor Count Erik Oxenstierna and Elisabeth Brahe. Their marriage remained childless.
