= Nikolaus Krell =

Calvinist chancellor of Saxony (died 1601)

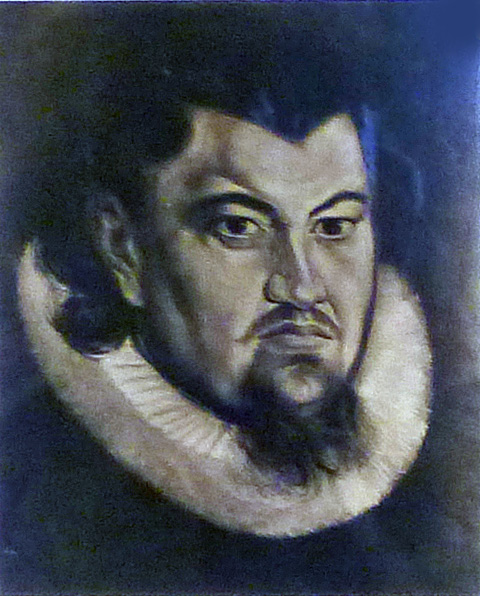
Nikolaus Krell

Nikolaus Krell (c. 1551 – 9 October 1601), chancellor of the elector of Saxony, was born at Leipzig, and educated at the university of his native town.

About 1580 he entered the service of Christian I, the eldest son of Augustus I, elector of Saxony, and when Christian succeeded his father as elector in 1586, became his most influential counselor. Krell's religious views were Calvinistic or Crypto-Calvinistic, and both before and after his appointment as chancellor in 1589 he sought to advance his own religious views at the expense of the reigning Lutheran Orthodoxy which was the sanctioned religion of Electorate of Saxony. Calvinists were appointed to many important ecclesiastical and educational offices; a translation of the Bible with Calvinistic annotations was published; and Krell took other measures to attain his end.

In foreign politics, also, he sought to change the traditional policy of Saxony of close collaboration with the Habsburg emperors, acting in unison with John Casimir, regent of the Electorate of the Palatinate, and reaching out to Henry IV of France and Elizabeth I of England.

These departures from Saxon tradition, coupled with the jealousy felt at Krell's high position and autocratic conduct, made the chancellor very unpopular, and when the elector died in October 1591 he was deprived of his offices and thrown into Georgenburg prison of the Königstein Fortress by order of Frederick William, duke of Saxe-Altenburg, the regent for the young Elector Christian II. In May 1593, in the Leipzig Calvinist storm the houses of wealthy Calvinist-minded merchants were stormed and plundered.

His trial was delayed until 1595, and then, owing partly to the interference of the imperial court of justice (Reichskammergericht), dragged on for six years. At length it was referred by Emperor Rudolph II to a court of appeal at Prague, and Krell sentenced to death. He was decapitated in the Jüdenhof in Dresden on 9 October 1601. He is commemorated by a paving stone with the inscription "Kr" at the spot of his execution in the Dresden Stallhof.

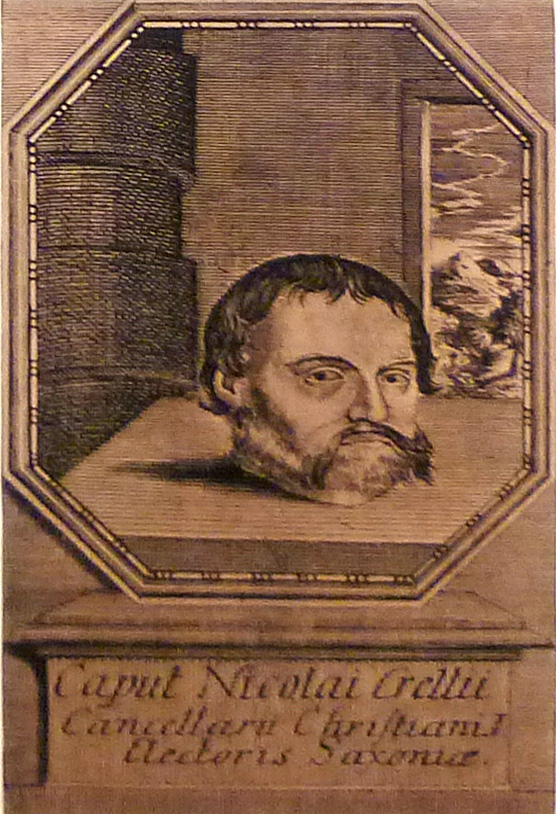
Severed head of Nikolaus Krell on an engraving

Krell was not the only individual accused of Crypto-Calvinism. The influential physician Caspar Peucer was also charged and subsequently imprisoned for years.
