= Elisabeth of Brunswick-Wolfenbüttel, Duchess of Saxe-Altenburg =

Elisabeth of Brunswick-Wolfenbuttel
- Duchess of Saxe-Altenburg
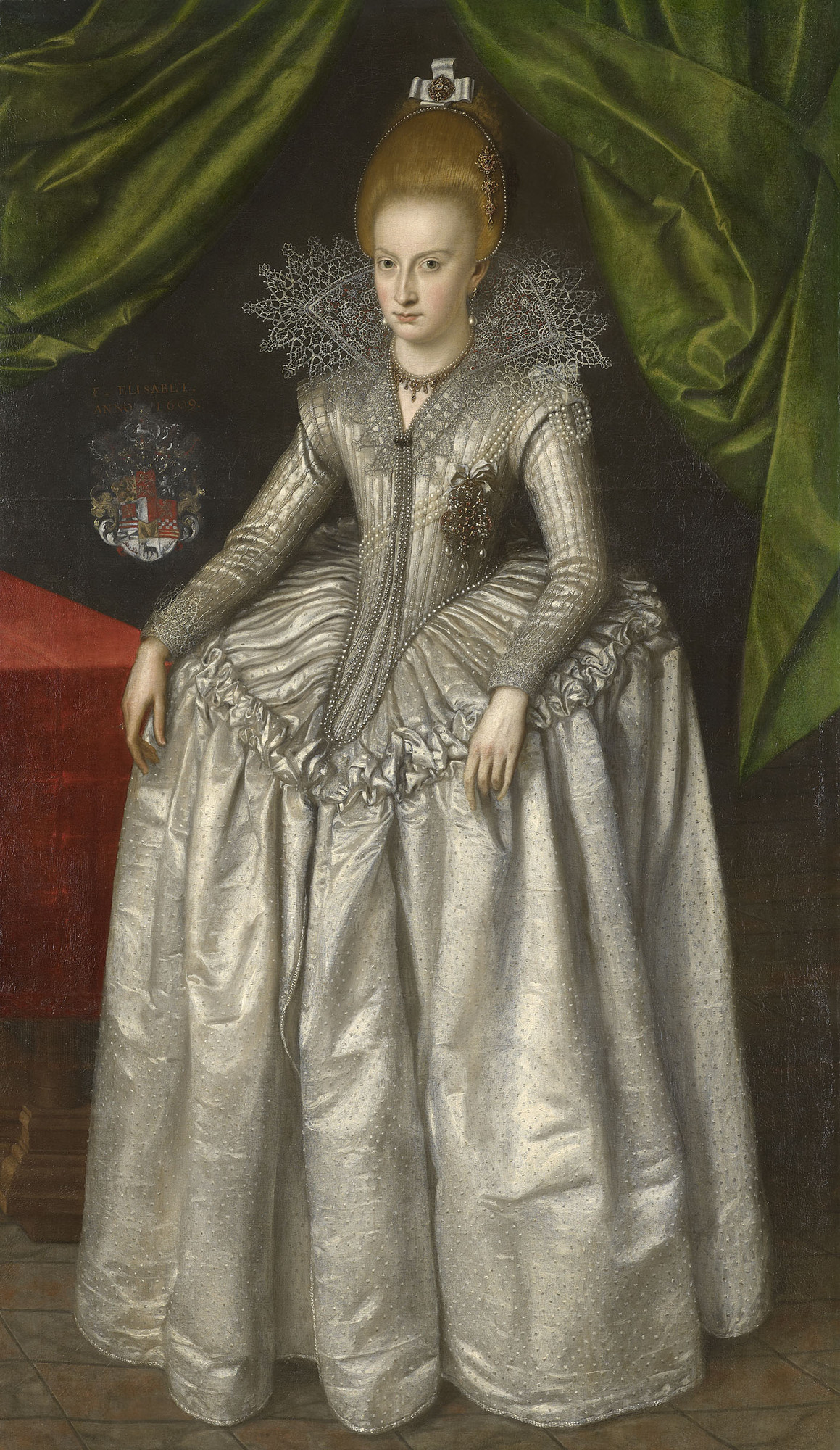
- Born: 23 June 1593; Wolfenbüttel
- Died: 25 March 1650 (aged 56); Altenburg
- Spouse: August of Saxony (m. 1612; died 1615) John Philip of Saxe-Altenburg (m. 1618; died 1639)
- Issue: Elisabeth Sophie, Duchess of Saxe-Gotha-Altenburg
- House: House of Welf
- Father: Henry Julius of Brunswick-Wolfenbüttel
- Mother: Elizabeth of Denmark and Norway

Elisabeth of Brunswick-Wolfenbüttel (23 June 1593 – 25 March 1650) was a German princess of Brunswick-Wolfenbüttel who became a Duchess of Saxe-Altenburg by marriage.

== Life ==
Elisabeth was born in Wolfenbüttel, the daughter of Duke Henry Julius of Brunswick-Wolfenbüttel (1564–1613) from his second marriage with Elizabeth (1573–1625), eldest daughter of King Frederick II of Denmark.

Elisabeth married first on 1 January 1612 in Dresden, to Duke August of Saxony (1589–1615), the administrator of the diocese of Naumburg. August suddenly died at the age of 26, after only three years of marriage.

Elisabeth's second husband was John Philip of Saxe-Altenburg (1597–1639). They married on 25 October 1618 in Altenburg.

Elisabeth died on 25 March 1650 in Altenburg and was buried in the Brethren Church in Altenburg, to which she had donated a beaker. The motto of the Duchess, who was with both an Albertine and an Ernestine, was: All my delight is in God. An oval gold ducats exists, depicting Elisabeth exists, showing her effigy on the obverse and a crowned "E" on the reverse. Elisabeth was a member of the virtuous society under the name the Pious.

== Offspring ==
From her second marriage, Elisabeth had only one daughter:

- Elisabeth Sophie (1619–1680), married in 1636 Duke Ernst I of Saxe-Gotha (1601–1675)
