= Christian II of Saxony =

Elector of Saxony from 1591 to 1611

Christian II
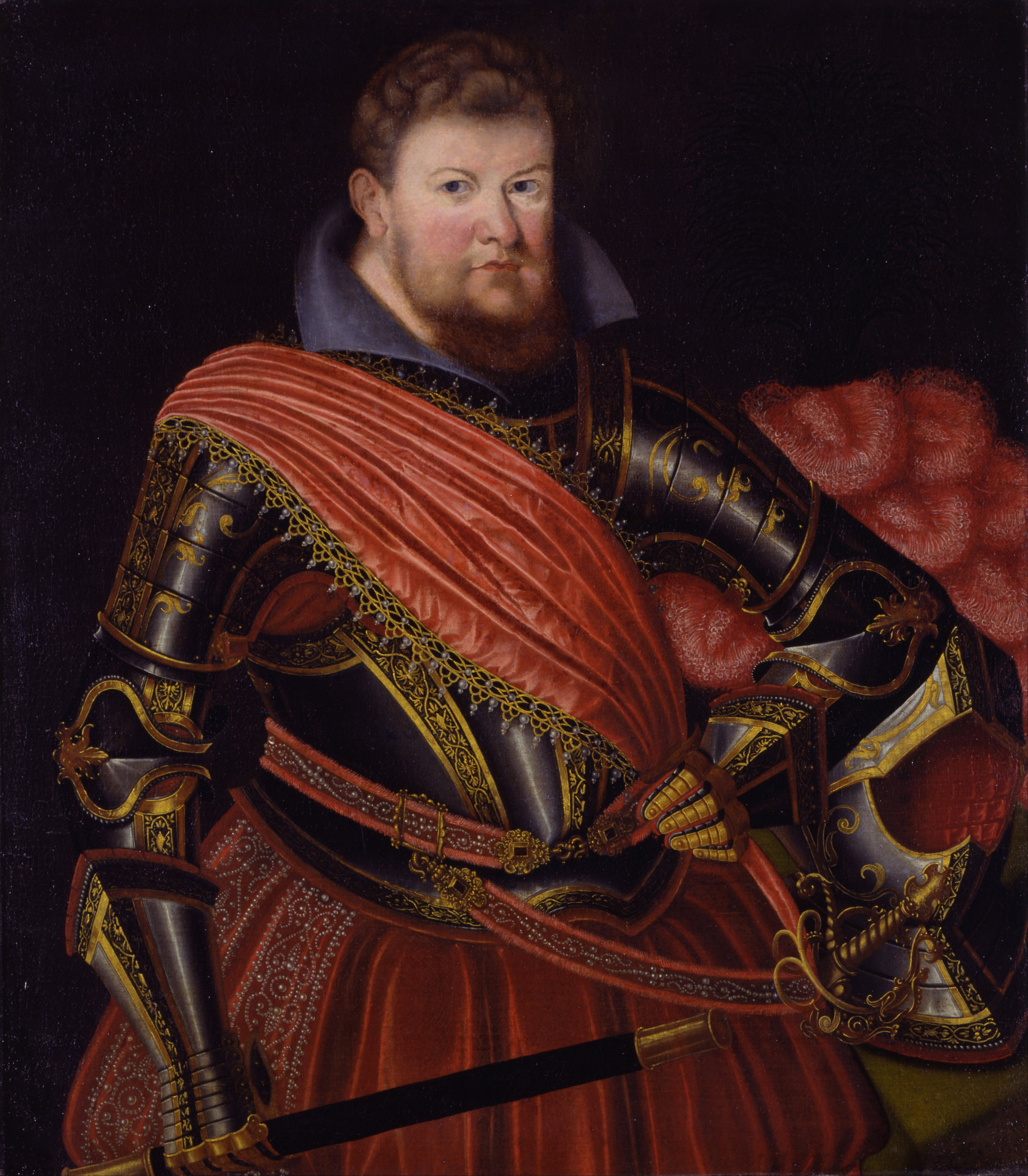

Elector of Saxony
- Reign: 25 September 1591 – 23 June 1611
- Predecessor: Christian I
- Successor: John George I
- Regent: Frederick William I, Duke of Saxe-Weimar
- Born: 23 September 1583; Dresden, Electorate of Saxony, Holy Roman Empire
- Died: 23 June 1611 (aged 27); Dresden, Electorate of Saxony, Holy Roman Empire
- Burial: Freiberg Cathedral
- Spouse: Hedwig of Denmark (m. 1602)
- House: Wettin (Albertine line)
- Father: Christian I, Elector of Saxony
- Mother: Sophie of Brandenburg
- Religion: Lutheran

Christian II (23 September 1583 – 23 June 1611) was Elector of Saxony from 1591 to 1611.

== Early life and background ==
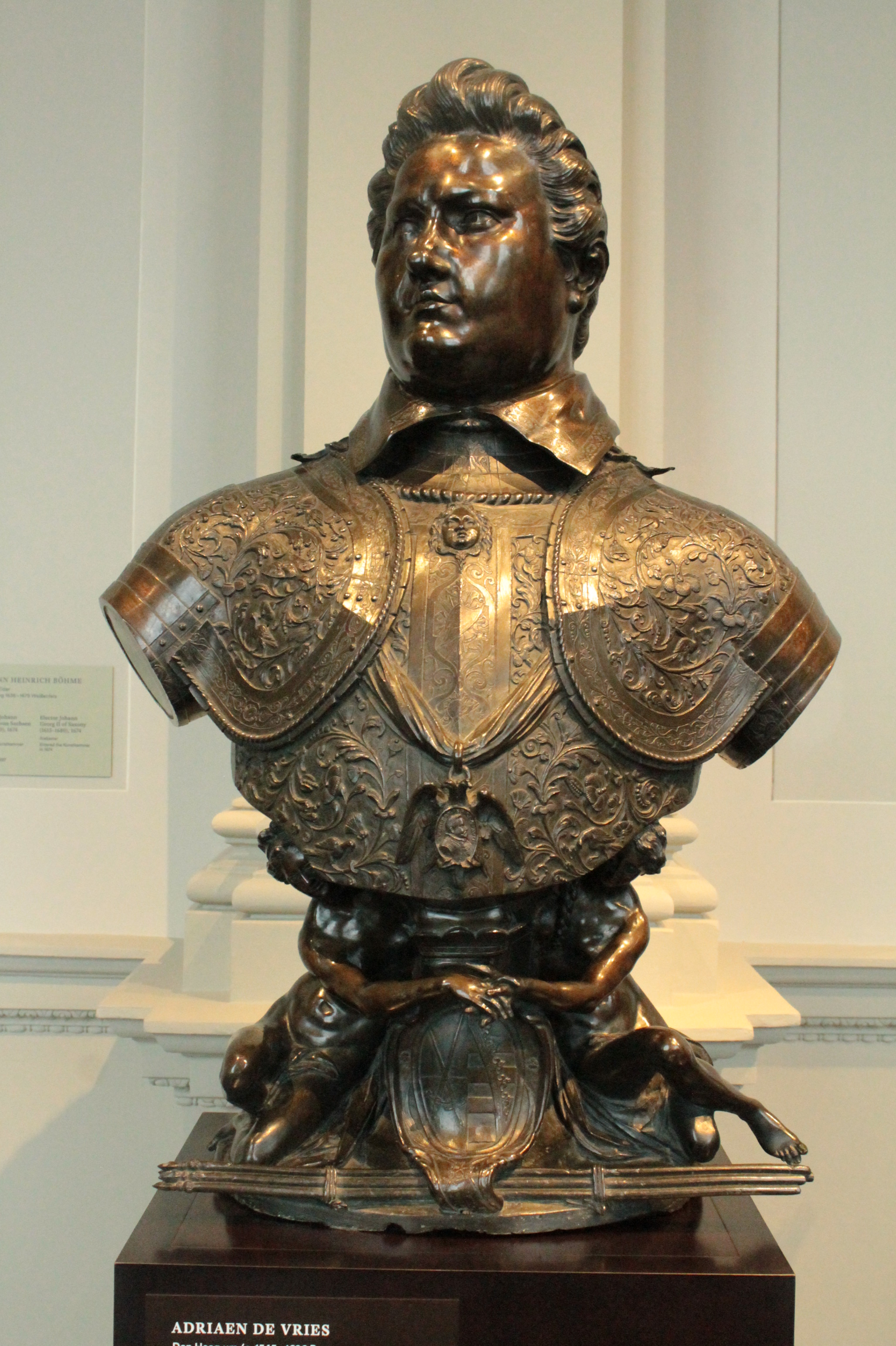
Christian II of Saxony by Adriaen de Vries 1603, Museum of Old Masters, Dresden

He was born in Dresden, the eldest son of Christian I, Elector of Saxony and Sophie of Brandenburg, the daughter of John George, Elector of Brandenburg. He belonged to the Albertine branch of the House of Wettin. The Albertine Wettins had become enfeoffed with the Saxon electorate in 1547 after Duke Moritz of Saxony backed the emperor in the Schmalkaldic War, siding against his cousin, Elector Johann Friedrich I, of the agnatically senior Ernestine line. Moritz was succeeded in the electorate by his brother August, who remained staunchly Lutheran and a steadfast ally of the emperor, well-aware that the Albertine Wettins owed their status to imperial favour. August established much of Saxony's politically moderate tactics and policies that would be closely followed by Christian II.

When August died in 1586, Christian I succeeded him as the Elector of Saxony and rejected his father's orthodoxy; Christian I was a committed Philippist and his chancellor Nikolaus Krell introduced a Philippist bible in 1589, despite mounting popular opposition. An alcoholic and gambling addict, Christian I allowed Krell to dominate his court. The internal shift at the Saxon court also saw a rapprochement with the Palatinate in January 1591, which Christian I intended to steer towards a more moderate course. This alliance quickly collapsed upon Christian I's sudden death in September, leading to Christian II succeeding his father at the age of eight.

== Elector of Saxony ==
=== Minority and regency ===
Christian succeeded to the electorship of Saxony and as a result of his youth, his cousin, Duke Friedrich Wilhelm I of Saxe-Weimar, and maternal grandfather, Elector Johann Georg of Brandenburg, assumed the regency of the electorate. The young elector's reign was immediately hit with internal strife; Christian I's unexpected death had sparked rumours that he had been poisoned by a Lutheran establishment in Saxony to forestall a Calvinist reformation. From 1591 to 1593, Christian's mother Sophie of Brandenburg orchestrated a reactionary purge of Philippists and crypto-Calvinists, imprisoning Krell and obliging all pastors to swear allegiance to the Lutheran Book of Concord, earning approval from Saxony's Lutheran populace. Convinced that he had corrupted her late husband, Sophie worked to have Krell executed, though found herself obstructed by the imperial courts.

Over the course of Christian's minority, Saxony returned to its orthodox stance in imperial politics and drifted into political passivity, as Christian's regents were reluctant to take any risks. Christian II came of age in September 1601.

=== Imperial politics ===
Like his father, Christian II suffered from alcoholism and was even less able to assert himself than his father, allowing his mother to dominate Saxon politics. Sophie worked to maintain Saxony's support of Emperor Rudolf II despite the lack of any tangible benefits, with a Saxon privy councillor noting in 1610 "politically, we're papists". Despite numerous delays from the imperial courts of justice, eventually the Reichshofrat confirmed the death sentence of Krell, despite lack of evidence of any conspiracy and pleas of mercy from Elizabeth I of England and Henri IV of France. On 9 October 1601, Krell was publicly executed in Dresden, with Sophie taking the seat of honour. This act of revenge was widely interpreted across the empire as Christian's determination to oppose Calvinism. In Dresden, on 12 September 1602, Christian married Hedwig, daughter of the King Frederick II of Denmark. This marriage was childless.

The internal strife and growing conservatism in Saxony allowed for the more militant Palatinate to reassert itself as the leading Protestant principality and seek the establishment of a new Protestant alliance, now with the backing of Prince Christian I of Anhalt-Bernburg. While the Palatinate led six Protestant congresses with the intention of withholding assistance for the emperor's war against the Turks, Christian II boycotted these congresses which greatly depowered the Palatine's authority. The Palatinate and Anhalt managed to gain the support of Ansbach and Hessen-Kassel for a new Protestant Union, but Christian II refused to attach Saxony to the cause, and further lack of support from Denmark, England, and France saw Ansbach and Hessen-Kassel ultimately side with Saxony in imperial politics. The atmosphere became so hostile that when someone shot at Christian II while he was out riding in April 1603, Saxony accused Christian of Anhalt of planning an assassination.

Christian II's support of imperial policy wavered during the 1608 Reichstag; Christian had come to agree with the Palatinate's argument for itio in partes in imperial institutions. Saxon prestige meant that Christian II was now the spokesman of Protestant issues and the Palatinate began to fall in line with Saxony's moderate language. However, Saxony's moderation became untenable with the Habsburg counterdemand for the return of all Catholic church property confiscated by Protestant princes since 1552, a significant hardening of the Catholic position. The Protestant initiative passed back to the Palatinate and moderation from Saxony was drowned out amidst rising passions, culminating in a Palatine walkout. The collapse of the 1608 Reichstag suggested the futility in Christian II's faith in imperial institutions and safeguards for Protestant princes. Christian of Anhalt capitalised on the discontent and united his peers behind the Protestant Union on 14 May, under the leadership of Frederick IV, Elector Palatine. The union's Palatinate leadership was provisional, for there was hope that Christian II would join and lead the northern German principalities, however Saxony's continued refusal to join ensured that the northeastern princes remained neutral. In 1609, the death of Duke Johann Wilhelm of Jülich-Cleves-Berg saw a succession crisis emerge over his rich and vast territories. The leading claimants were Brandenburg and Palatinate-Neuburg and their troops jointly occupied the duchies. Despite moderation from Saxony, Rudolf II was unable to decide on the matter and arbitrarily enfeoffed Christian II with the entire Jülich-Cleves inheritance on 7 July; Saxony was well-aware of its inability to hold the already occupied duchies and pushed for Rudolf to establish a new peace conference.

silver Memorial Taler (Sterbetaler / Begräbnistaler) minted in 1611 to commemorate the death of Christian II

Christian II died in Dresden on 23 July 1611; after having participated in a tournament in full armour, he climbed off his horse, drank a large amount of beer to cool down, and suddenly died from a heart attack. Having left no legitimate children with his wife, his brother Johann Georg succeeded him as the Elector of Saxony.

== Sources ==
- Groß, Reiner (2007). Die Wettiner. Stuttgart: Kohlhammer Verlag.
- Wilson, Peter H. (2009). Europe's Tragedy: A History of the Thirty Years War. Allen Lane. ISBN 978-0-7139-9592-3.
- Wilson, Peter (2016). Heart of Europe: A History of the Holy Roman Empire. Cambridge: Harvard University Press.

Christian II of Saxony House of Wettin Born: 23 September 1583 Died: 23 June 1611
Regnal titles
Preceded by Christian I	Elector of Saxony; 1591–1611	Succeeded by John George I
