= Elisabeth of Brunswick-Lüneburg, Duchess of Guelders =

- Born: 11 September 1494; Celle
- Died: 2 April 1572 (aged 77); Geldern
- Buried: Parish church in Geldern
- Noble family: House of Guelph
- Spouse: Charles II, Duke of Guelders
- Father: Henry I of Lüneburg
- Mother: Margarete of Saxony

Elisabeth of Brunswick-Lüneburg (11 September 1494 in Celle – 2 April 1572 in Geldern) was a Duchess of Brunswick-Lüneburg by birth and by marriage Duchess of Guelders.

== Life ==
Elizabeth was a daughter of Duke Henry I of Brunswick-Luneburg (1468–1532) from his marriage to Margaret (1469–1528), daughter of Elector Ernest of Saxony.

Elizabeth married on 7 December 1518 in Celle to Charles II, Duke of Guelders (1467–1538). In the marriage contract Charles had kept open the line of succession in Lorraine. Elisabeth was promised a jointure consisting of the distring and city of Geldern, plus an annual pension of 4000 gold guilders. The marriage remained childless. On 1528 in Gorinchem, Charles II of Guelders reached a compromise with Emperor Charles V: Charles II would retain the Duchy of Guelders for the rest of his life, however, when he died, Charles V would inherit the Duchy.

Elisabeth survived her husband by 34 years. She resided at her wittum in Geldern. As a devote Catholic, she supported her local parish church and the church in neighbouring Kerken generously, with monetary gifts and gifts in kind. In 1566, she suppressed an attempt to introduce the Reformation in her territory.

She died in Geldern on 2 April 1572 and was buried under the high altar of her parish church. A grave monument had been planned during her lifetime, however, it was not completed.

== Ancestors ==
Ancestors of Elisabeth of Brunswick-Lüneburg, Duchess of Guelders

8. Frederick II, Duke of Brunswick-Lüneburg
4. Otto V, Duke of Brunswick-Lüneburg
9. Magdalene of Brandenburg (1412–1454)
2. Henry the Middle, Duke of Brunswick-Lüneburg
10. John IV, Count of Nassau-Siegen
5. Anne of Nassau-Siegen
11. Mary of Looz-Heinsberg
1. Elisabeth of Brunswick-Lüneburg, Duchess of Guelders
12. Frederick II, Elector of Saxony
6. Ernest, Elector of Saxony
13. Margaret of Austria, Electress of Saxony
3. Margaret of Saxony, Duchess of Brunswick-Lüneburg
14. Albert III, Duke of Bavaria
7. Elisabeth of Bavaria, Electress of Saxony
15. Anna of Brunswick-Grubenhagen-Einbeck

== Sources ==
- Nijsten, Gerard (2004). In the Shadow of Burgundy: The Court of Guelders in the Late Middle Ages. Cambridge University Press.
