= Frederick II of Brunswick =

Frederick II, Duke of Brunswick-Lüneburg
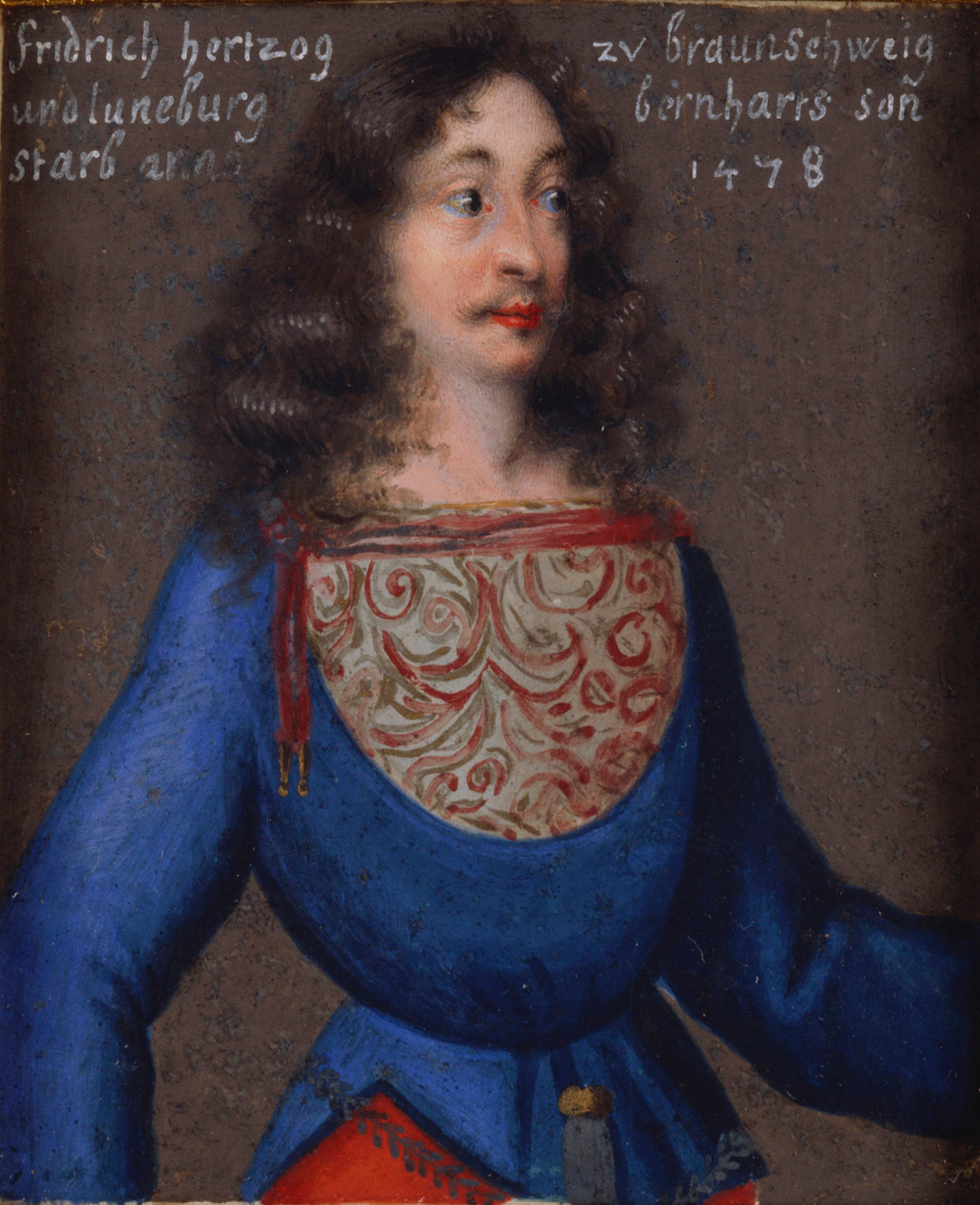
- Anonymous portrait (17th century)
- Born: 1418
- Died: 19 March 1478; Celle
- Noble family: House of Guelph
- Spouse: Magdalene of Brandenburg
- Issue: Bernhard II; Otto the Victorious; Gottfried; Margaret
- Father: Bernard I, Duke of Brunswick-Lüneburg
- Mother: Margaret of Saxony

Frederick II (German: Friedrich II.), also known as Frederick the Pious (German: der Fromme) (1418–1478) was a prominent German nobleman from the House of Guelph who served and ruled as the Duke of Brunswick-Lüneburg and Prince of Lüneburg from 1434 to 1457 and from 1471 to 1478. Born on 10 November 1418, he was the son of Duke Bernard I of Brunswick-Lüneburg and his wife, Margaret of Saxony.

== Life ==
After the death of his father, Bernard, Frederick assumed joint rule of the Principality of Lüneburg alongside his brother Otto. Their reign was marked by significant developments, including the extensive expansion of Celle Castle and the implementation of reforms aimed at improving the legal rights of farmers in relation to their landlords. Upon Otto's death in 1446, Frederick became the sole ruler of the principality. In 1452, he established a monastery dedicated to the Holy Cross (Heylig Kreuz) and invited Franciscan friars to settle in Celle.

In 1457, Frederick transferred governance of the principality to his son, Bernard, and entered monastic life himself. However, following the death of his second son, Otto V, in 1471, Frederick left the monastery to assume control once more, acting as regent for his three-year-old grandson, Henry. Frederick was ultimately interred in the church of the Franciscan monastery he had founded in Celle.

== Descendants ==
In 1437 Frederick II married Magdalene (1412–1454), daughter of Frederick I, Elector of Brandenburg, and had three children by her:

1. Bernhard II (died 1464) married Mathilda of Holstein-Schauenburg (died 1468)
2. Otto the Victorious (1439–1471) married Anne of Nassau-Siegen (1440/41–1514)
3. Gottfried (1441-1465) never married
4. Margaret (1442–1512) married Henry, Duke of Mecklenburg-Stargard (died 1466)

== Ancestors ==
Ancestors of Frederick II of Brunswick

8. Magnus the Pious, Duke of Brunswick-Lüneburg
4. Magnus II, Duke of Brunswick-Lüneburg
9. Sophie of Brandenburg-Stendal
2. Bernard I, Duke of Brunswick-Lüneburg
10. Bernhard III, Prince of Anhalt-Bernburg
5. Catherine of Anhalt-Bernburg
11. Agnes of Saxony
1. Frederick II, Duke of Brunswick-Lüneburg
12. Rudolf I, Duke of Saxe-Wittenberg
6. Wenceslas I, Duke of Saxe-Wittenberg
13. Agnes of Lindow-Ruppin
3. Margaret of Saxony
14. Francesco I da Carrara
7. Cecilia of Carrara
15. Fina di Buzzacarini

Frederick II of Brunswick House of Welf Cadet branch of the House of Este Born: 1418 Died: 19 March 1478
German nobility
Preceded by Bernard I	Duke of Brunswick-Lüneburg; Princes of Lüneburg until 1446 joint reign with brother Otto IV; 1434–1457	Succeeded by Bernard II
Preceded by Otto V the Victorious	Duke of Brunswick-Lüneburg; Prince of Lüneburg; 1471–1478	Succeeded by Henry the Middle
