= Minsk Voivodeship =

Voivodeship of the Grand Duchy of Lithuania

Coordinates: 53°54′13″N 27°33′16″E

Minsk Minsk Voivodeship Województwo mińskie
- Voivodeship of the Grand Duchy of Lithuania, later Polish–Lithuanian Commonwealth
- 1566–1793
- Coat of arms

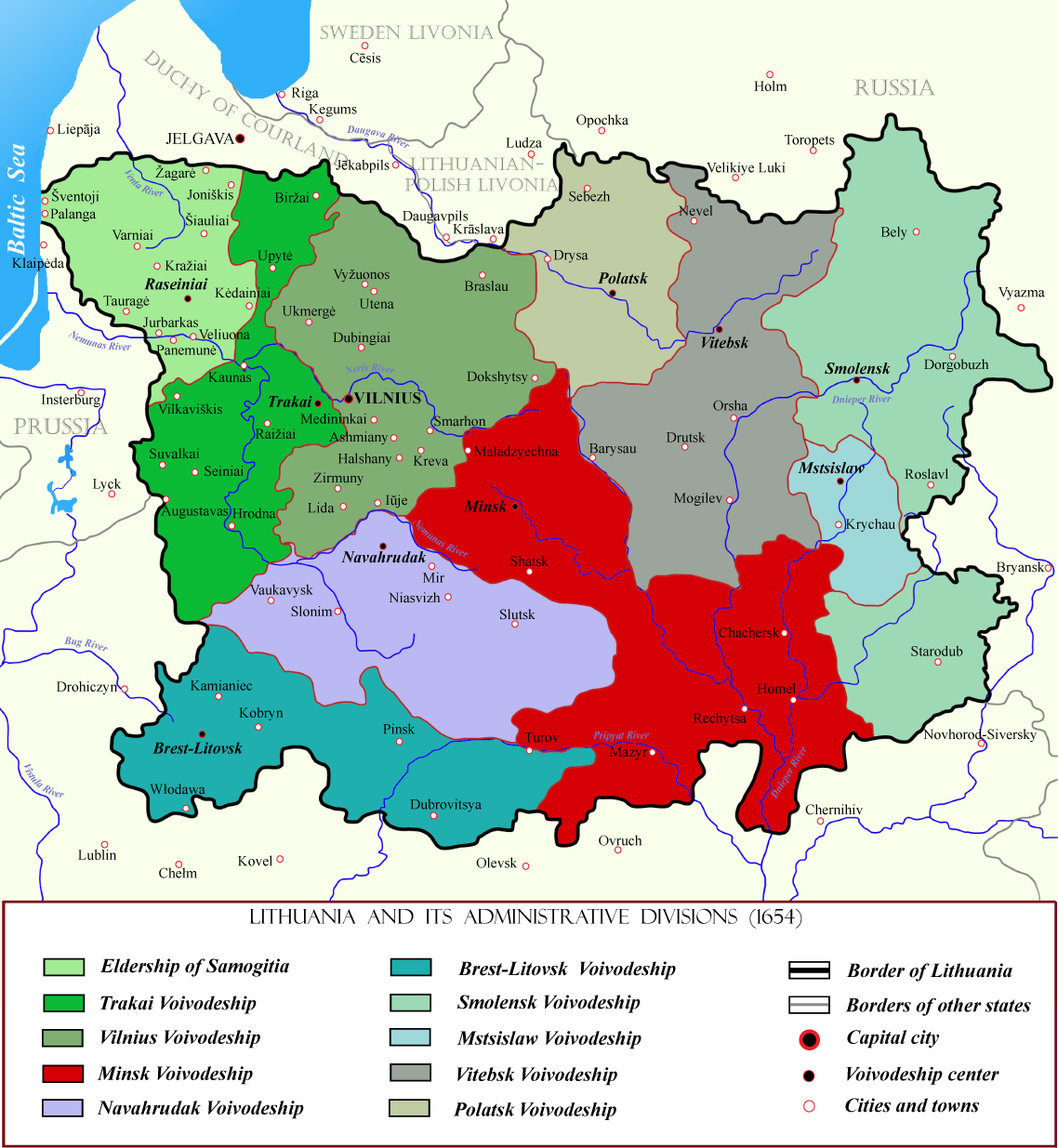
- Minsk Voivodeship in red. Voivodeship's borders did not change since the Union of Lublin.
- Capital: Minsk
- Area
- 55,500 km^{2} (21,400 sq mi)
- History
  - Established: 1566
  - Second partition of the Polish–Lithuanian Commonwealth: 1793
- Political subdivisions: counties: three
Preceded by	Succeeded by
Principality of Minsk	Russian Empire

Minsk Voivodeship (Belarusian: Менскае ваяводзтва, romanized: Menskaje vajavodztva; Polish: Województwo mińskie; Lithuanian: Minsko vaivadija; Latin: Palatinatus Minscensis) was a unit of administrative division and local government in Grand Duchy of Lithuania since 1566 and later in Polish–Lithuanian Commonwealth, until the partitions of the Commonwealth in 1793. Centred on the city of Minsk and subordinate to the Grand Duchy of Lithuania, the region continued the traditions – and shared the borders – of several previously existing units of administrative division, notably a separate Duchy of Minsk, annexed by Lithuania in the 13th century. It was replaced with Minsk Governorate in 1793.

== Geography ==
The voivodeship was stretched along the Berezina and Dneper rivers, with the earlier river having both its source and its estuary within the limits of the voivodeship, as well as most of its basin. To the north east it bordered Polotsk, Vitebsk and Mscislaw voivodeships. To the east it bordered with the lands of Chernigov (on both sides of the Dneper and Sozh rivers), while to the south-east it was delimited by the river Snov. Further southwards the voivodeship was bordering the land of Kiev. Across the basin of the Pripyat river the land of Minsk was bordering the Brześć Voivodeship (across Ubort river) and Nowogródek Voivodeship (across Ptsich river). Further northwards it was bordering the capital of the Grand Duchy, the Vilnius Voivodeship.

== History ==
Minsk had been a capital of a semi-independent duchy at least since 1067. Raided on a yearly basis by the Lithuanians, by the 12th century it was made a fief and in the 14th century it was directly incorporated into the Grand Duchy. In 1441 the city of Minsk was granted with a city charter, by the king Casimir IV Jagiellon. His son, Alexander Jagiellon extended the privilege in 1496 and granted the town with Magdeburg Laws. Since then, the entire region shared the fate of its capital city. In 1773 a post-Jesuit academy had been founded in Minsk by the Commission of National Education.

== Politics ==
All voivodeships played an important role within the Polish political system, extended to Lithuania by the Polish–Lithuanian unions. Following the final Union of Lublin of 1569, the Minsk Voivodeship received two seats within the Senate. The seats were held ex officio by the voivod and the castellan of Minsk. Each of the three powiats organized its own Sejmik, which had a right to elect two members of Sejm each, and two deputies to the Lithuanian Tribunal.

The three cities were also entitled to house local courts. Since 1599, the Tribunal of Lithuania did also held sessions in Minsk (every three years, other cities it visited were Vilnius and Navahrudak). The court held there served the role of the highest juridical authority for all of Ruthenian voivodeships, that is Minsk, Nowogródek, Vitebsk, Mstislav and Kiev. Following the first partition of Poland in 1775, the tribunal abandoned Minsk and held its sessions in Hrodna.

Notable voivodes of Minsk include Balcer Strawiński (1631–33), Aleksander Suszka (1633–38) and Mikołaj Sapieha (since 1638).

== Voivodes of Minsk Voivodeship ==
Map showing Mińsk Voivodeship of the Polish–Lithuanian Commonwealth.

- Gabriel Hornostaj (1566–76)
- Mikołaj Sapieha (Elder) (1576–88)
- Bohdan Sapieha (1588–93)
- Jan Abramowicz (1593–96)
- Andriusz Zawisza (1596–98)
- Jan Pac (1600–11)
- Mikołaj Sapieha (1611–18)
- Piotr Tyszkiewicz (1618–31)
- Balcer Strawiński (1631–33)
- Aleksander Suszka (1633–38)
- Mikołaj Sapieha (1638)
- Aleksander Massalski (1638–43)
- Andriusz Massalski (1643–45)
- Aleksander Ogiński (1645–49)
- Gideon Rajecké (1649–54)
- Krzysztof Ciechanowiecki (1654–55)
- Krzysztof Rudomina-Dusiacki (1655)
- Jan Sebastian Kęsztort (1656–67)
- Kazimierz Białłozor (1667–80)
- Michael Siasickis (1680–98)
- Władysław Jozafat Sapieha (1699–1709)
- Krzysztof Zenovicz (1709–17)
- Krzysztof Stanisław Zawisza (1720–21)
- Jan Kazimierz Toad (1721–54)
- Jan August Hylzen (1754–67)
- Józef Jerzy Hylzen (1767–70)
- Tadeusz Burzyński (1770–73)
- Józef Mikołaj Radziwiłł (1773–84)
- Adam Chmara (1784–93)

== Colours ==
Much like other Ruthenian lands, the Minsk voivodeship signed its documents with the Pogoń (Chase) coat of arms. The flag was Or, in field Gules a chase Carnation. The official uniform was a crimson kontusz and żupan, with a navy blue collar. The powiat of Rechytsa adopted a white żupan with white collar.
