= Ernest I of Schauenburg =

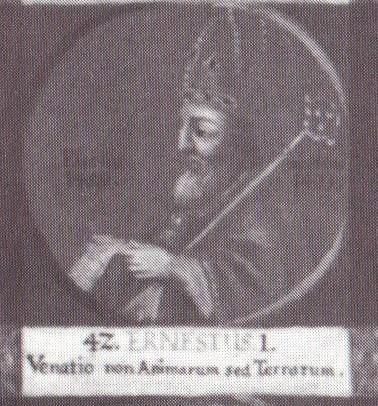
Ernest as the 42nd Bishop of Hildesheim on a painting with medallion portraits of all the Hildesheim bishops to the end of the 18th century. Latin inscription reads: "Hunt for territories, not for souls".

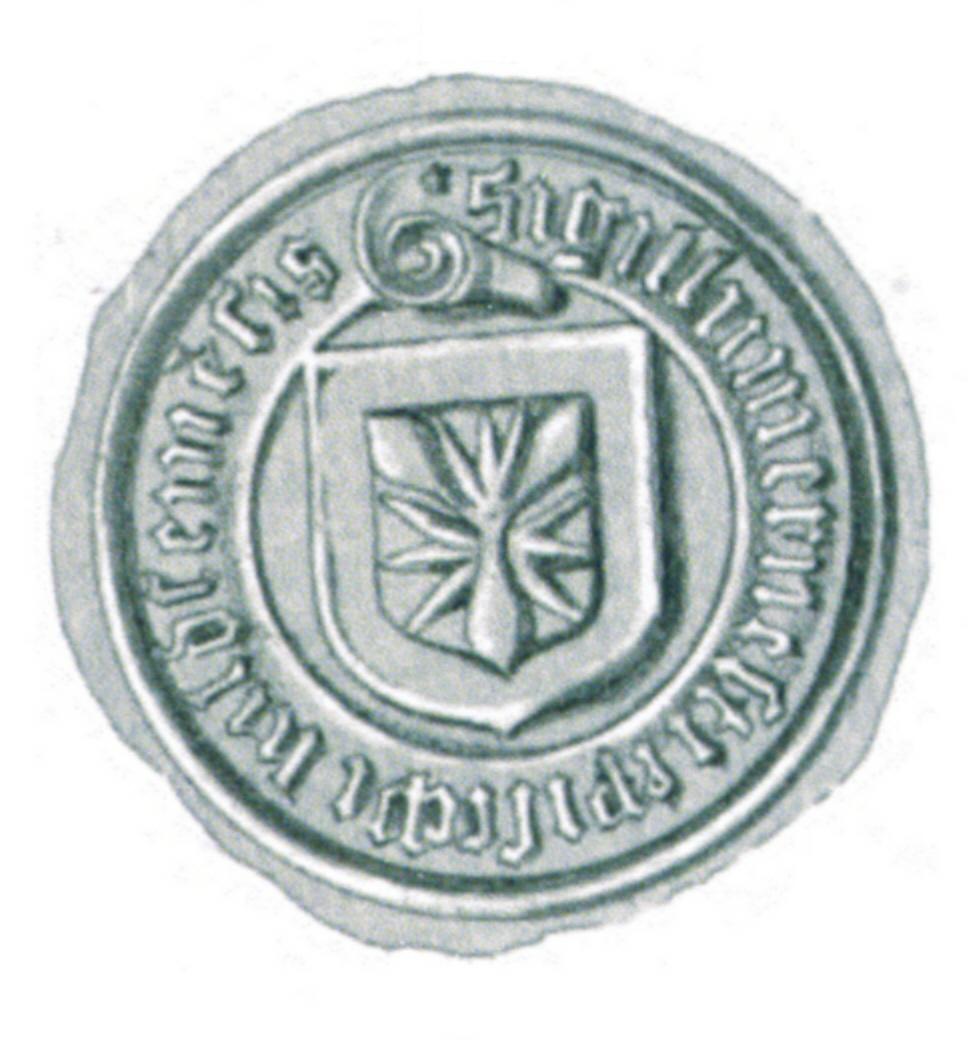
Seal of Ernest I of Schauenburg from around 1565

Ernest I of Schauenburg (German: Ernst I. von Schauenburg) (ca. 1441 – 1471) became the Bishop of Hildesheim in 1458.

The son of Otto of Holstein-Schauenburg became a canon in Hildesheim in 1445. In 1458 (at the age of seventeen) he was chosen as the bishop and installed in the following year. He was devoted to hunting and warfare. In 1459 he introduced restrictions to the church's jurisdiction.

He was unable, however, to fend off the devastation of his bishopric by the neighbouring princes. During his time in office, the Seven Chapters (Sieben Stifter) emerged for the first time as part of the Territory of the former Principality of Hildesheim. In 1469, his city forged a defensive alliance with Duke Otto of Lüneburg. He died of grief on 22/23 Jul 1471, as a result of the misfortune suffered in the war with Duke Frederick.

== Sources ==
Preceded by Bernard III of Brunswick-Lüneburg	Bishop of Hildesheim; 1458–1471	Succeeded by Henning of Haus
