= Pious =

Pious may refer to:

- Farshad Pious (born 1962), Iranian retired footballer
- Minerva Pious (1903–1979), American actress
- Robert Pious (1908–1983), American painter and illustrator

== See also ==
- List of people known as the Pious
- Piety
- Hasid, a Jewish honorific that can be translated as "pious"
- Salih (literal translation: "Pious"), a prophet mentioned in the Quran
