= Anna of Brunswick =

Anna of Brunswick may refer to:

- Anna of Brunswick-Wolfenbüttel (died 1432), spouse of Frederick IV, Duke of Austria
- Anna of Brunswick-Grubenhagen (1414–1474), spouse of Albert III, Duke of Bavaria
- Anna of Brunswick-Lüneburg (1502–1568), spouse of Barnim XI
- Archduchess Anna of Austria (1528–1590), Duchess of Bavaria and daughter of Anna of Bohemia and Hungary
