= Józef Mikołaj Radziwiłł =

Polish–Lithuanian noble (1736–1813)

- Prince
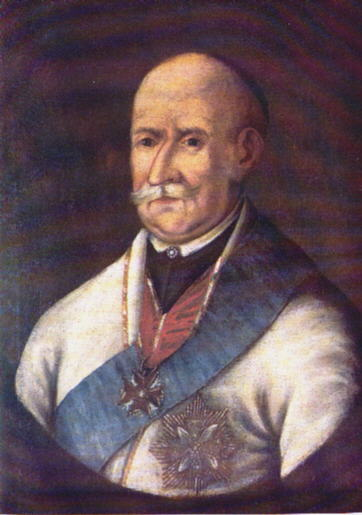

- Coat of arms: Trąby
- Born: 13 November 1736; Kraków
- Died: 15 February 1813 (aged 76)
- Family: Radziwiłł
- Consort: Elżbieta Chodkiewicz
- Issue: with Angelika Miączyńska; Konstancja Radziwiłł; Wiktoria Radziwiłł; Anna Radziwiłł; Antoni Radziwiłł
- Father: Marcin Mikołaj Radziwiłł
- Mother: Aleksandra Bełchacka

Prince Józef Mikołaj Radziwiłł (Lithuanian: Juzefas Mikalojus Radvila; 13 November 1736–1813) was a Polish–Lithuanian noble (szlachcic).

The 8th Ordynat of Kleck, Grand Clerk of Lithuania since 1764, voivode of Minsk Voivodeship since 1773, castellan of Trakai since 1784, voivode of Trakai Voivodeship since 1788 and Knight of Malta.

Knight of the Order of the White Eagle, awarded in 1777.
