= Adalbert of Saxony =

Administrator of Mainz

Adalbert III of Saxony
- Born: 8 May 1467; Meissen
- Died: 1 May 1484 (aged 16); Aschaffenburg
- Noble family: House of Wettin
- Father: Ernest, Elector of Saxony
- Mother: Elisabeth of Bavaria-Munich

Adalbert of Saxony (8 May 1467 in Meissen – 1 May 1484 in Aschaffenburg) was administrator of the Archdiocese of Mainz as Adalbart III.

Adalbert was the son of Elector Ernest of Saxony and his wife Elisabeth of Bavaria-Munich. In order to protect the Thuringian areas of the Archdiocese of Mainz around Erfurt and in the Eichsfeld area, archbishop Diether von Isenburg and the cathedral chapter of Mainz appointed Aldalbert, who was still a minor, in 1477 as Provisor of the city of Erfurt and High Bailiff of Rusteberg Castle in Rustenfelde in the Eichsfeld. In 1479, Adalbert was made a member of the cathedral chapter in Mainz.

In 1480, he was elected coadjutor with the right to succeed as archbishop. This election result was confirmed by Pope Sixtus IV in 1481, despite the Pope's reservations. After Dieter died, Adalbert succeeded him as ruler of the Archbishopric of Mainz on 8 May 1482. Since he was too young to be ordained as bishop, he became administrator. In 1483, he demanded that the city of Erfurt recognize the suzerainty of Mainz over the city. The archbishop's residence, Martinsburg Castle in Mainz, was completed during Adalbert's reign.

Adalbart died in 1484, before he could be ordained as bishop, so he was never archbishop. He is therefore depicted without mitre and pallium.

Adalbert was unmarried. However, he had an illegitimate daughter named Sybilla.

Adalbert of Saxony House of Wettin Born: 8 May 1467 Died: 1 May 1484
| Preceded by Diether of Isenburg | Archbishop of Mainz; 1482-1484 | Succeeded by Berthold of Henneberg |
