= List of people known as the Pious =

The epithet the Pious may refer to:

- Adalbert I, Count of Vermandois (c. 915/917–988)
- Albert III, Duke of Bavaria (1401–1460)
- Bolesław the Pious (1224/27–1279), Duke of Greater Poland and various other realms
- Boleslaus II, Duke of Bohemia (died 999)
- Ernest I, Duke of Saxe-Gotha (1601–1675), also Duke of Saxe-Altenburg
- Frederick II, Duke of Brunswick (1418–1478), also Prince of Lüneburg
- Frederick III, Elector Palatine (1515–1576)
- Henry II the Pious (c. 1196/1207–1241), Duke of Silesia and Duke of Kraków and thus High Duke of all Poland as well as Duke of Southern Greater Poland
- John II, Duke of Cleves (died 1521)
- John III of Portugal (1502–1557), King of Portugal and the Algarves
- Judah he-Hasid (disambiguation) ("Judah the Pious"), two people
- Louis the Pious (778–840), King of Acquitaine, King of the Franks, and co-Emperor (as Louis I) with his father, Charlemagne
- Magnus I, Duke of Brunswick-Lüneburg (died 1369)
- Maria I of Portugal (1734–1816), first undisputed queen regnant of Portugal
- Mikołaj Sapieha (1581–1644), Lithuanian Great Standard-Keeper, Voivode of Minsk, Voivode of Brześć Litewski, and castellan of Vilnius in the Polish-Lithuanian Commonwealth
- Robert II of France (972–1031), King of France
- Rudolph III of Burgundy (993–1032), last king of an independent Burgundy
- Sigwin von Are (died 1089), Archbishop of Cologne
- Simeon the Just (fl. third century), Jewish High Priest during the time of the Second Temple
- Stanisław Radziwiłł (1559–1599), Great Lithuanian Marshal
- Sulpitius the Pious, seventh century Bishop of Bourges
- William II, Count of Provence (c. 987–1019)
- William V, Duke of Bavaria (1548–1626)

== See also ==
- Leopold V, Duke of Austria (1157–1194), known as the Virtuous, also Duke of Styria
