= Mikołaj Sapieha (1581–1644) =

Nobleman of Poland and Lithuania

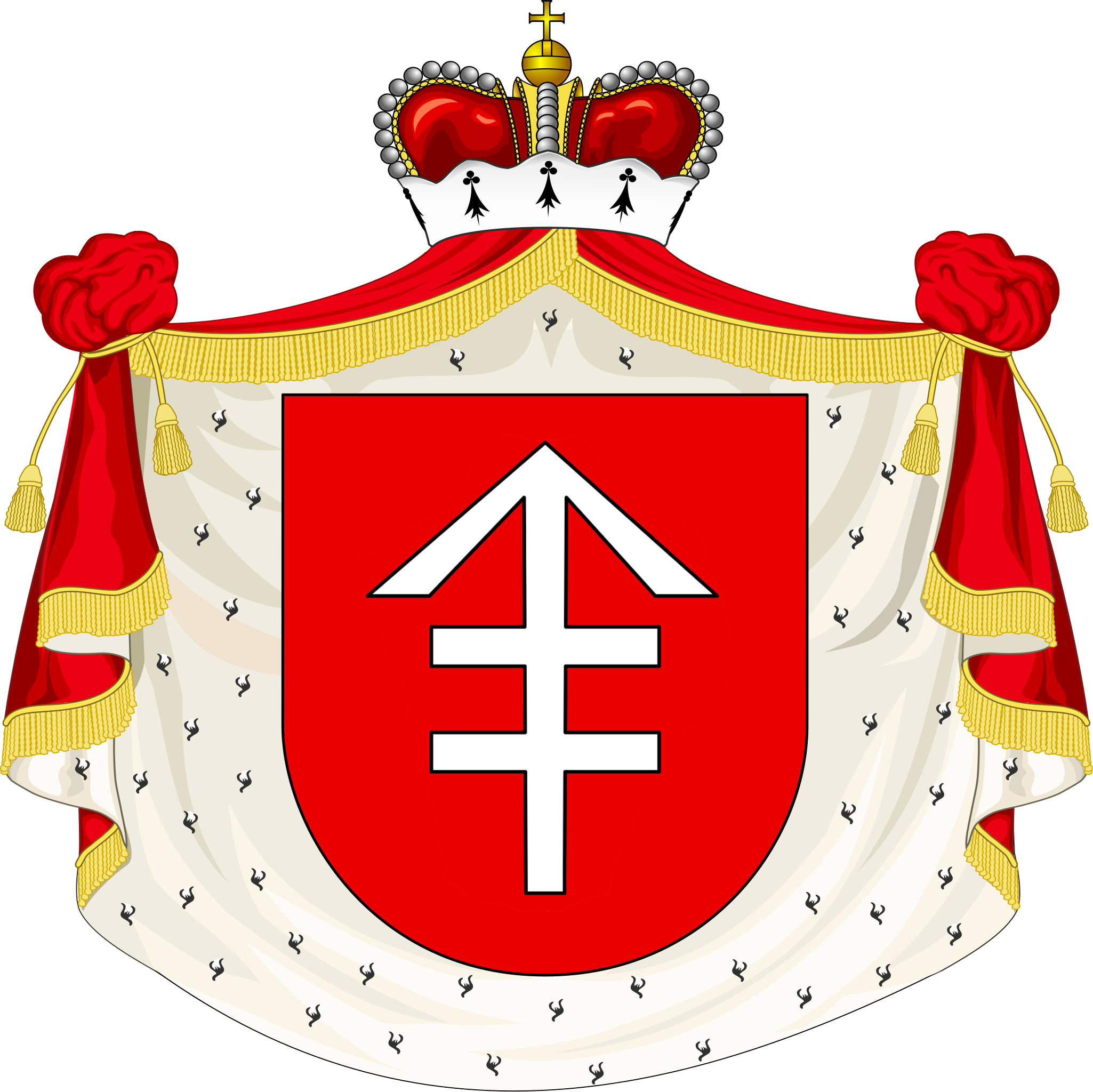
- Coat of arms
- Born: 1581
- Died: 14 March 1644; Lublin
- Noble family: Sapieha
- Father: Mikołaj Sapieha (d. 1599)
- Mother: Hanna Wiśniowiecka

Mikołaj Sapieha (Lithuanian: Mykalojus Sapiega) (1581–1644) also known as Pobożny ("Pious") was a Polish–Lithuanian nobleman and Grand Lithuanian Standard-Keeper. He was also Voivode of Minsk, Voivode of Brześć Litewski and Castellan of Vilnius.

In 1638 he became Voivode of Minsk (from July), before taking the post of Voivode of Brześć Litewski in November that year. In 1642 he became the Castellan of Vilnius.

== Sources ==
- Zofia Kossak-Szczucka, Błogosławiona Wina, Warszawa 1953
- Historia Sanktuarium i cudownego obrazu Matki Bożej Kodeńskiej (in Polish)
