= Margaret of Saxony, Duchess of Brunswick-Lüneburg =

Margarete of Saxony
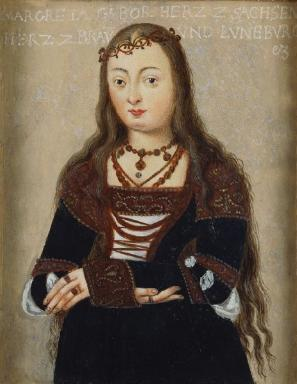
- Margarete of Saxony, Duchess of Brunswick-Lüneburg
- Born: 4 August 1469; Meissen
- Died: 7 December 1528 (aged 59); Weimar
- Burial: Church of St. Peter und Paul in Weimar
- Spouse: Henry I of Lüneburg (m. 1487)
- Issue Detail: Elisabeth, Duchess of Guelders; Otto I, Duke of Brunswick-Lüneburg-Harburg; Ernest I, Duke of Brunswick-Lüneburg; Duchess Apollonia; Anna, Duchess of Pomerania; Francis,Duke of Brunswick-Gifhorn
- House: Wettin
- Father: Ernest, Elector of Saxony
- Mother: Elizabeth of Bavaria

Margarete of Saxony (4 August 1469 in Meissen – 7 December 1528 in Weimar) was a Saxon princess of the Ernestine line of the house Wettin by birth and by marriage a Duchess of Brunswick-Lüneburg.

== Life ==
Margarete was a daughter of the Elector Ernest of Saxony (1441–1486) from his marriage to Elizabeth (1443–1484), a daughter of the Duke Albert III of Bavaria-Munich. Her brothers Frederick the Wise and John the Steadfast were Electors of Saxony; her sister Christina was Queen of Denmark.

Margarete married on 27 February 1487 in Celle with Duke Henry I of Brunswick-Lüneburg (1468–1532). Henry had already been sent to the Saxon court as a 12-year-old. Marriage negotiations presumably began in 1469, as Henry's father, Otto V had formed an alliance with Margarete's uncle William. The Saxon side had delayed the marriage until the expansion of the Celle Castle was completed, as the district and castle of Celle had been promised to Margarete as her wittum.

Margarete died in 1528 and was buried in the Church of St. Peter and Paul in Weimar.

== Issue ==
1. Anna (born: 1492; died young)
2. Elisabeth (1494–1572), married in 1518 Duke Charles II of Guelders (1467–1538)
3. Otto I (1495–1549), Duke of Brunswick-Lüneburg married in 1527 Meta of Campe (died: 1580)
4. Ernest I the Confessor (1497–1546), Duke of Brunswick-Lüneburg, married in 1528 Princess Sophia of Mecklenburg (1508–1541)
5. Apollonia (1499–1571), nun
6. Anna (1502–1568), married in 1525 Duke Barnim IX of Pomerania (1501–1573)
7. Francis (1508–1549), Duke of Brunswick-Gifhorn, married in 1547 princess Clara of Saxe-Lauenburg (1518–1576)
