= Anna of Brunswick-Lüneburg (1502–1568) =

Duchess consort of Pomerania (1502–1568)

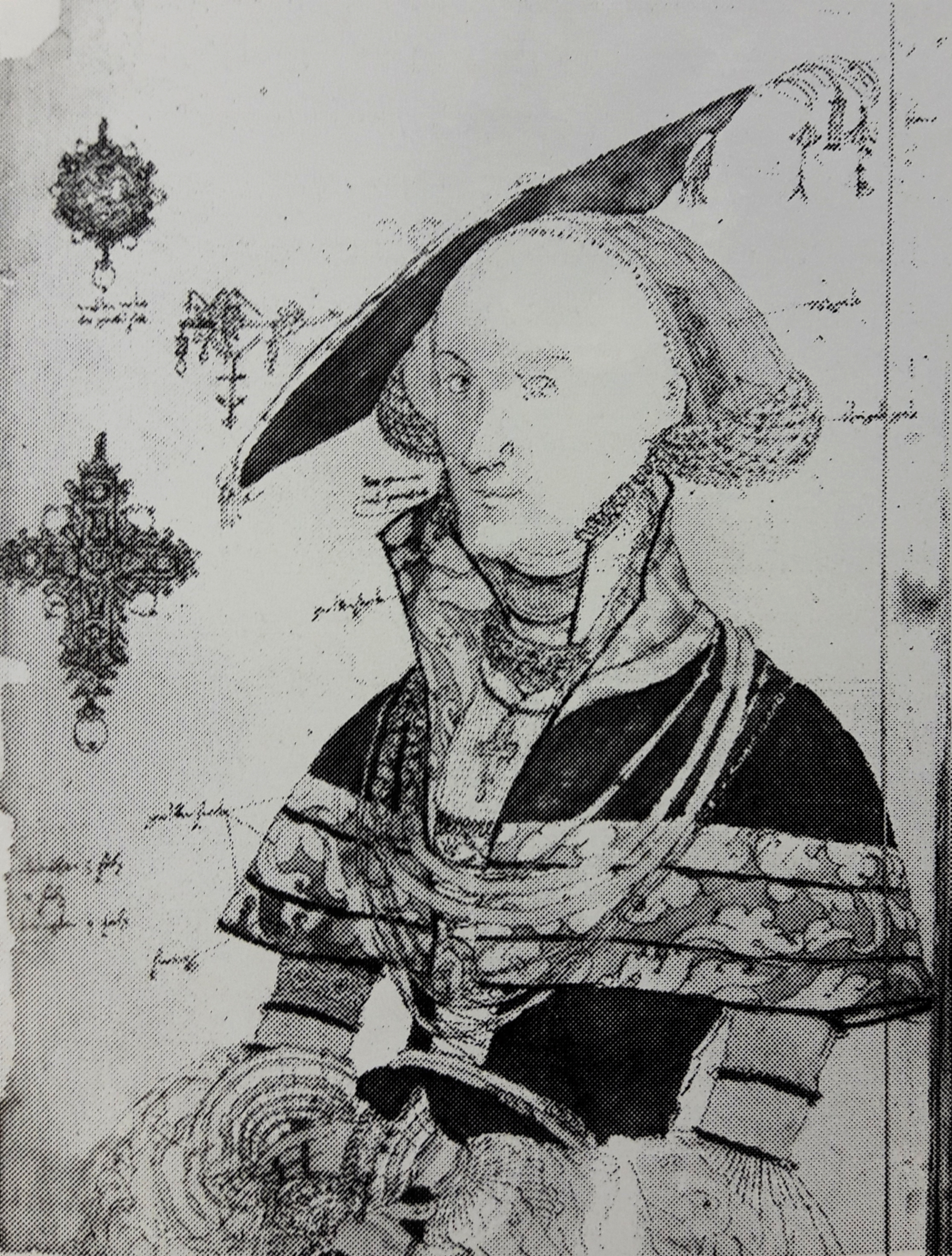
- Study for portrait of Anna of Brunswick-Lüneburg by Lucas Cranach the Elder or workshop, c. 1545
- Born: 6 December 1502; Celle
- Died: 6 November 1568 (aged 65); Szczecin
- Buried: Church of St. Otto in Szczecin
- Noble family: House of Guelph
- Spouse: Barnim XI, Duke of Pomerania
- Father: Henry I of Lüneburg
- Mother: Margarete of Saxony

Anna of Brunswick-Lüneburg (6 December 1502 in Celle – 6 November 1568 in Szczecin) was a princess of Brunswick-Lüneburg by births and marriage Duchess of Pomerania.

== Life ==
Anna was a daughter of the Duke Henry I of Lüneburg (1468–1532) from his marriage to Margaret (1469–1528), daughter of the Elector Ernest of Saxony.

She married on 2 February 1525 in Szczecin Duke Barnim XI of Pomerania (1501–1573). On the occasion of their marriage, Barnim concluded a defensive alliance with her father. In exchange for her dowry of 12000guilders Anna was promised the city and district of Stolp as her Wittum. In 1536, she was promised the district of Rügenwalde instead. Anna died before her husband, so that these promises never had to be applied.

Anna died in 1568 and was buried in the Church of St. Otto in Szczecin.

Anna was one of the strongest opponents of her brother-in-law George. She felt that he put her husband at a disadvantage in the government of Pomerania and that George's intent to marry Margaret of Brandenburg was undermining her own position. Anna was a driving force behind the division of Pomerania in 1532.

== Issue ==
From her marriage, Anna had the following children:

- Maria (1527–1554), married in 1544 to Count Otto IV of Schauenburg-Pinneberg (1517–1576)
- Dorothea (1528–1558), married in 1554, Count John I of Mansfeld-Hinterort (d. 1567)
- Alexandra (b. 1534; died young)
- Elizabeth (1537–1554)
- Anna (1531–1592), married:
  1. in 1557 to Prince Karl I of Anhalt-Zerbst (1534–1561)
  2. in 1566 to Burgrave Henry VI of Plauen (1536–1572)
  3. in 1576 to Count Jobst II of Barby-Mühlingen (1544–1609)
- Sibylla (1541–1564)
- Bogislaw XII (c. 27 August 1542 – before 15 September 1542)
