= Elisabeth of Bavaria, Electress of Saxony =

Elisabeth of Bavaria-Munich
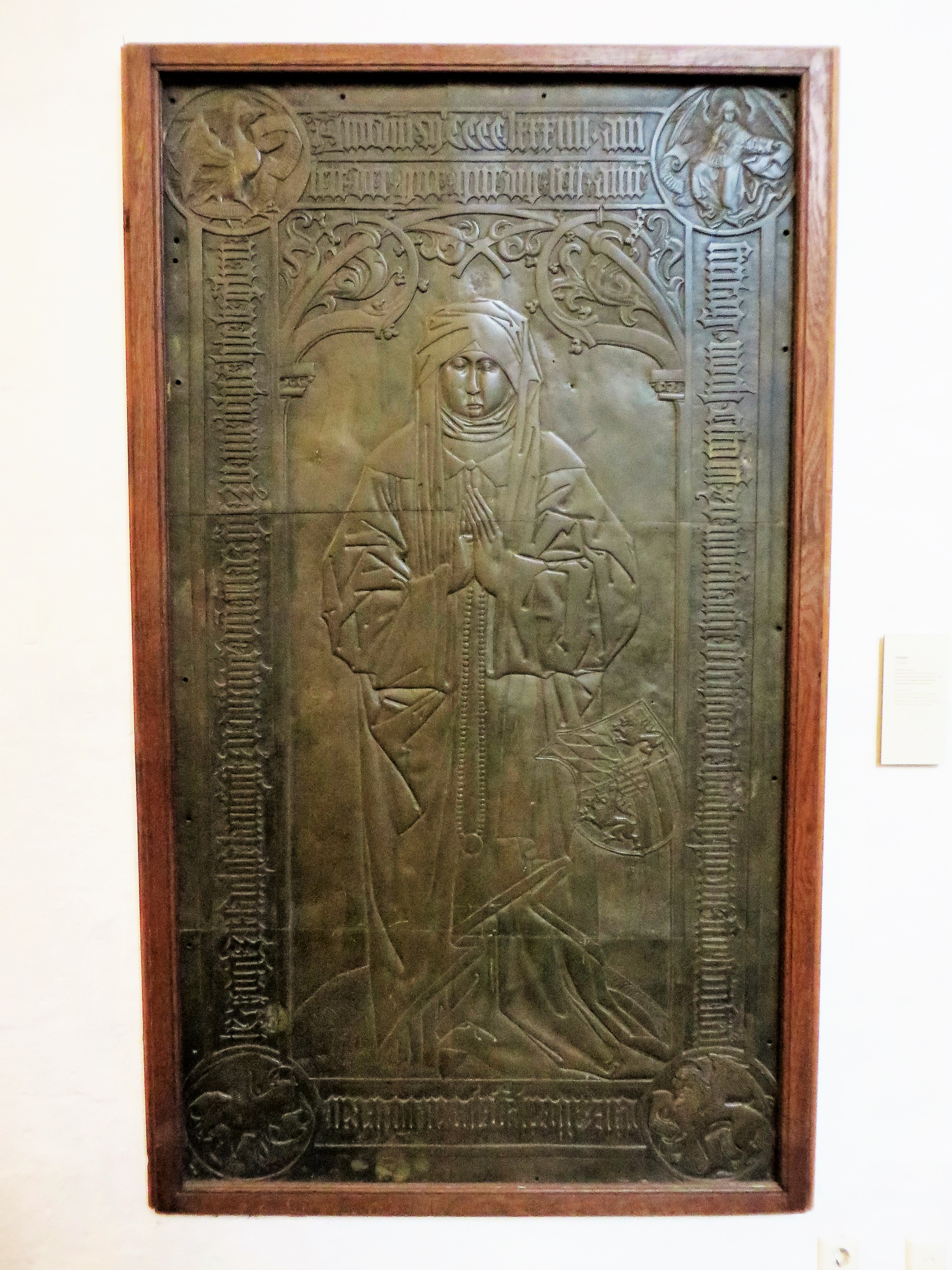
- Grave of Elisabeth of Bavaria-Munich.

Electress consort of Saxony
- Tenure: 7 September 1464 – 5 March 1484
- Born: 2 February 1443; Munich
- Died: 9 March 1537 (aged 94); Leipzig
- Burial: Paulinerkirche, Leipzig
- Spouse: Ernest, Elector of Saxony (m. 1460)
- Issue Detail: Christina, Queen of Denmark; Frederick III, Elector of Saxony; Ernest, Bishop of Halberstadt; Aldabert III, Administrator of Mainz; John, Elector of Saxony; Margarete, Duchess of Brunswick-Lüneburg; Wolfgang of Saxony
- House: Wittelsbach
- Father: Albert III, Duke of Bavaria
- Mother: Anna of Brunswick-Grubenhagen-Einbeck

Elisabeth of Bavaria-Munich (2 February 1443 – 5 March 1484) was a princess of Bavaria-Munich by birth and by marriage Electress of Saxony.

== Life ==
Elizabeth was a daughter of the Duke Albert the Pious of Bavaria-Munich (1401–1460) from his marriage to Anna of Brunswick-Grubenhagen-Einbeck (1420–1474), daughter of the Duke Eric I of Brunswick-Grubenhagen.

She married on 25 November 1460 in Leipzig with the prince who later became the Elector Ernest of Saxony (1441–1486). The engagement took place some ten years before and the marriage should have taken place in 1456, according to the marriage agreement. In 1471, a new palace was built on the Castle Hill in Meissen, as a residence for the royal household. Elisabeth was a key influencing factor for the careful education of her children and especially their scientific training. The marriage of the royal couple was seen as happy and Ernest loved his wife dearly.

The Princess, who is considered the matriarch of the Ernestine line of the House of Wettin, She died on 5 March 1537, in Leipzig, Saxony, Germany, at the age of 94, and was buried in Leipzig, Amt Leipzig, Saxony. At the end of her life, she was bedridden and for her care a bed with wheels and a hoist was used. Elisabeth died almost simultaneously with her son Adalbert and her mother-in-law Margaret. Ernest died in August of the same year. Elizabeth's son, Frederick the Wise was said to have written to Spalatin that he had ridden from one funeral to the next.

== Children ==
From their marriage with Ernest, Elizabeth had the following children:

- Christina (1461–1521)

married in 1478 King John I of Denmark, Norway and Sweden (1455–1513)

- Frederick the Wise (1462–1525), Elector of Saxony
- Ernest (1464–1513), Archbishop of Magdeburg, Administrator of Halberstadt
- Adalbert (1467–1484), Administrator of the Archdiocese of Mainz.
- John the Steadfast (1468–1532), Elector of Saxony

married firstly in 1500 Princess Sophie of Mecklenburg-Schwerin (1481–1503)
married secondly in 1513 Princess Margarete of Anhalt (1494–1521)

- Margarete (1469–1528)

married in 1487 Duke Henry I of Brunswick-Lüneburg (1468–1532)

- Wolfgang (1473–1478)

== Footnotes ==
Elisabeth of Bavaria, Electress of Saxony House of Wittelsbach Born: 7 September 1464 Died: 5 March 1486
Royal titles
Preceded by Margaret of Austria	Electress consort of Saxony; 7 September 1464 – 5 March 1486	Vacant Title next held by Sibylle of Cleves
