= Margaret of Brunswick-Lüneburg (1442–1512) =

- Born: 1442
- Died: 8 April 1512; Wienhausen
- Buried: Chapel of All Saints at Wienhausen Abbey
- Noble family: House of Guelph
- Spouse: Henry, Duke of Mecklenburg-Stargard
- Father: Frederick II, Duke of Brunswick-Lüneburg
- Mother: Magdalene of Brandenburg

Margaret of Brunswick-Lüneburg (1442 – 8 April 1512 in Wienhausen) was a princess of Brunswick-Lüneburg by birth and by marriage a Duchess of Mecklenburg-Stargard.

== Life ==
Margaret was a daughter of the Duke Frederick II of Brunswick-Lüneburg (1418–1478) from his marriage to Magdalene (1412–1454), the daughter of Elector Frederick I of Brandenburg.

In 1452, Margaret became the third wife of the Duke Henry of Mecklenburg-Stargard (1412–1466). As a dowry she brought with her 8000guilders, which her husband doubled. After her husband's death, she lived on her jointure in Plau am See, which Henry had promised to her.

With the death of her stepson Ulrich II the Mecklenburg-Stargard line died out and the indebted country fell to Mecklenburg-Schwerin, which was not responsible for the maintenance of Stargard's widow. Margaret then lived in Celle for a while. The dispute between the houses of Brunswick-Lüneburg and Mecklenburg-Schwerin about her jointure at Plau am See dragged on until her death.

Margaret spent her 46-year-long widowhood in abject poverty. In letters to their relatives, they said that they would suffer even hunger and thirst. In 1499 she was, under pressure from the Dukes of Brunswick, admitted as a permanent resident to Wienhausen Abbey. She was financially supported by her sister-in-law Anne, the widow of her brother Otto V, who sent her only 12 guilders per year.

She died on 8 April 1512 in Wienhausen and was buried there in the Chapel of All Saints.

== Issue ==
From her marriage Margaret had two daughters:

- Magdalene (1461–1532)

married firstly, in 1475, with Duke Wartislaw X of Pomerania (1435–1478)
married secondly, in 1482, with Count Burkhard of Barby-Mühlingen (d. 1505)

- Anna (1465–1498), a nun in Ribnitz Monastery

== Ancestors ==
Ancestors of Margaret of Brunswick-Lüneburg (1442–1512)

8. Magnus II, Duke of Brunswick-Lüneburg
4. Bernard I, Duke of Brunswick-Lüneburg
9. Catherine of Anhalt-Bernburg
2. Frederick II, Duke of Brunswick-Lüneburg
10. Wenceslas I, Duke of Saxe-Wittenberg
5. Margaret of Saxony
11. Cecilia of Carrara
1. Margaret of Brunswick-Lüneburg
12. Frederick V, Burgrave of Nuremberg
6. Frederick I, Elector of Brandenburg
13. Elisabeth of Meissen
3. Magdalene of Brandenburg
14. Frederick, Duke of Bavaria
7. Elisabeth of Bavaria-Landshut
15. Maddalena Visconti
