= Brest Litovsk Voivodeship =

Voivodeship of the Grand Duchy of Lithuania

Coordinates: 52°05′12″N 23°39′32″E

Brest-Litovsk Voivodeship Brest-Litovsk Voivodeship Województwo brzesko-litewskie
- Voivodeship of the Grand Duchy of Lithuania, later Polish–Lithuanian Commonwealth
- 1566–1795
- Flag Coat of arms

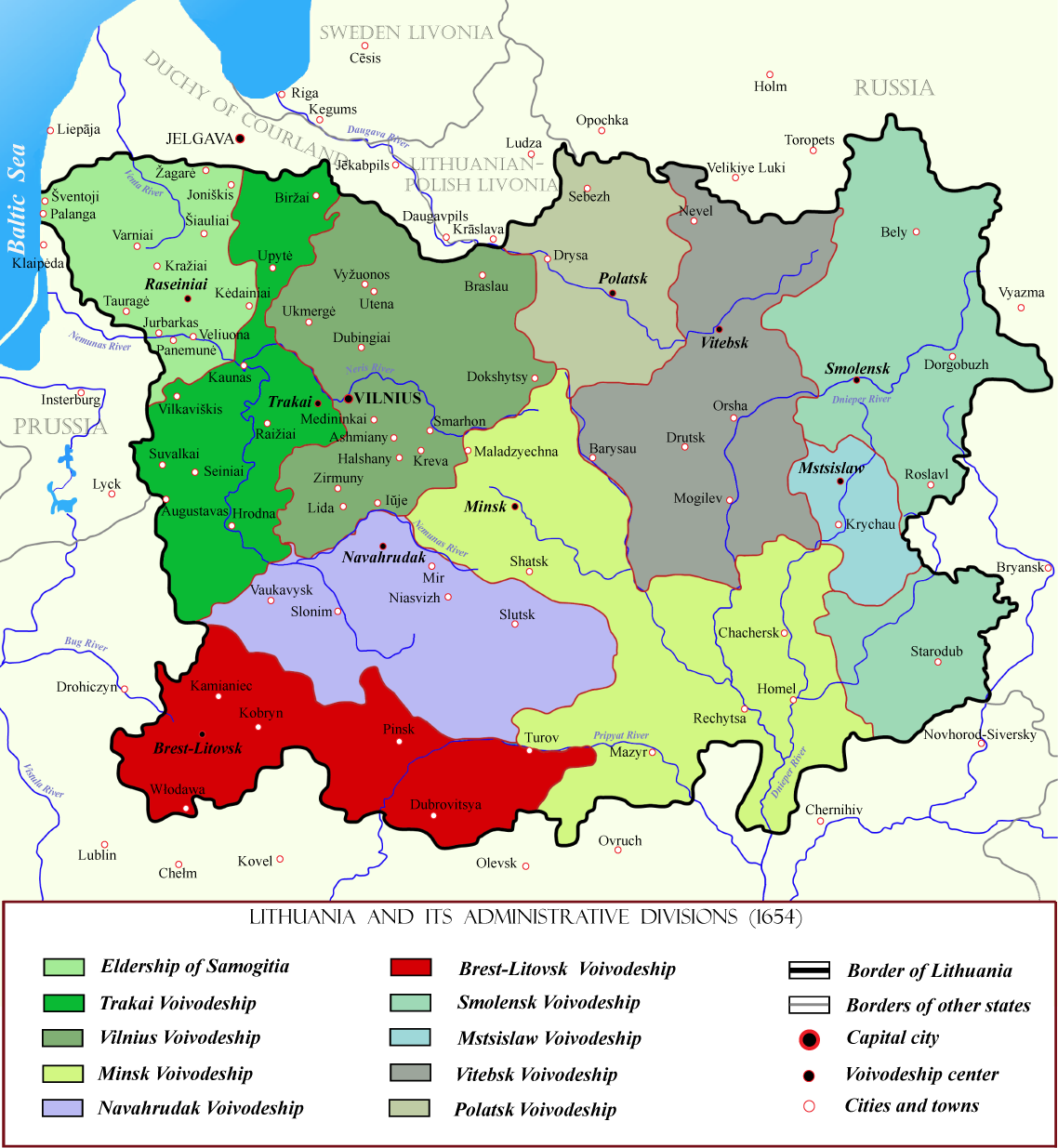
- Brest-Litovsk Voivodeship in red. Voivodeship's borders did not change since the Union of Lublin.
- Brześć Litewski Voivodeship in Polish–Lithuanian Commonwealth
- Capital: Brest-Litovsk
- Area
- 40,600 km^{2} (15,700 sq mi)
- History
  - Established: 1566
  - Third partition of the Polish–Lithuanian Commonwealth: 1795
- Political subdivisions: counties: two
Preceded by	Succeeded by
Duchy of Lithuania	Russian Empire
- Today part of: Belarus; Poland; Ukraine

Brest Litovsk Voivodeship (Belarusian: Берасьцейскае ваяводзтва; Polish: Województwo brzeskolitewskie) was a unit of administrative territorial division and a seat of local government (voivode) in the Grand Duchy of Lithuania (Polish–Lithuanian Commonwealth) from 1566 until the May Constitution in 1791, and from 1791 to 1795 (partitions of Poland) as a voivodeship in Poland. It was constituted from Brest-Litovsk and Pinsk counties.

== History ==
It was created from the southern part of Trakai Voivodeship in 1566. In 1791 Kobryn and Pinsk-Zarzeche (whose center was Poltnica, now Plotnitsa) counties were created. Pinsk-Zarzeche county was renamed Zapynsky and its seat was moved to Stolin. After the Second Partition of Poland, in 1793, Pinsk and Zapynsky counties became part of the Russian Empire's Minsk Governorate. The remainder of it was dissolved in 1795 and became part of Slonim Governorate.

== Governors ==
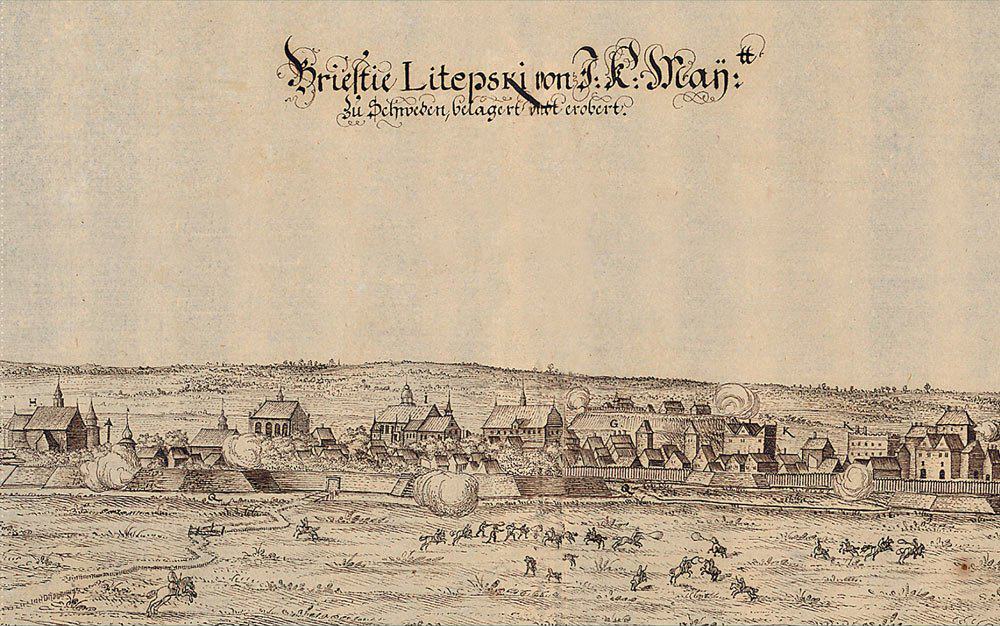
Brześć Litewski, capital of the voivodeship, in the 17th century

Voivodeship Governor (Wojewoda) seat:

- Brest-Litovsk

Voivodes:

- Jerzy Ilinicz (1566)
- Jerzy Tyszkiewicz Łohojski (1566-1576)
- Gabriel Hornostaj (1576-1587)
- Mikołaj Michał Sapieha (1587-1588)
- Jan Kiszka (1589—1592)
- Krzysztof Zenowicz (Zienowicz) (1592—1615)
- Jan Ostafi Tyszkiewicz Łohojski (1615-1631)
- Aleksander Ludwik Radziwiłł (1631–1635)
- Mikołaj Sapieha (XI 1638-VII 1642)
- Teofil Iwan Tryzna (1642—1644)
- Andrzej Massalski (1645-1651/1652)
- Jerzy Klonowski (1652—1653)
- Maksymilian Brzozowski (1653-1659)
- Kazimierz Ludwik Jewłaszewski (1659—1664)
- Jakub Teodor Kuncewicz (1664—1666/1667)
- Melchior Stanisław Sawicki (1666—1668)
- Krzysztof Piekarski (1668-1672)
- Stefan Kurcz (1672—1702)
- Krzysztof Komorowski (1702-1708)
- Władysław Jozafat Sapieha (1709-1733)
- Kazimierz Leon Sapieha (1735-1738)
- Adam Tadeusz Chodkiewicz (1738-1745)
- Jan Michał Sołłohub (1745-1748)
- Karol Józef Sapieha (1748-1768)
- Jan Antoni Horain (1768-1777)
- Mikołaj Tadeusz Łopaciński (1777—1778)
- Jan Tadeusz Zyberg (1783—1795)
