= Anne of Nassau-Siegen =

German countess (1440/41–1514)

- Duchess Consort of Brunswick-Lüneburg; Countess Consort of Katzenelnbogen
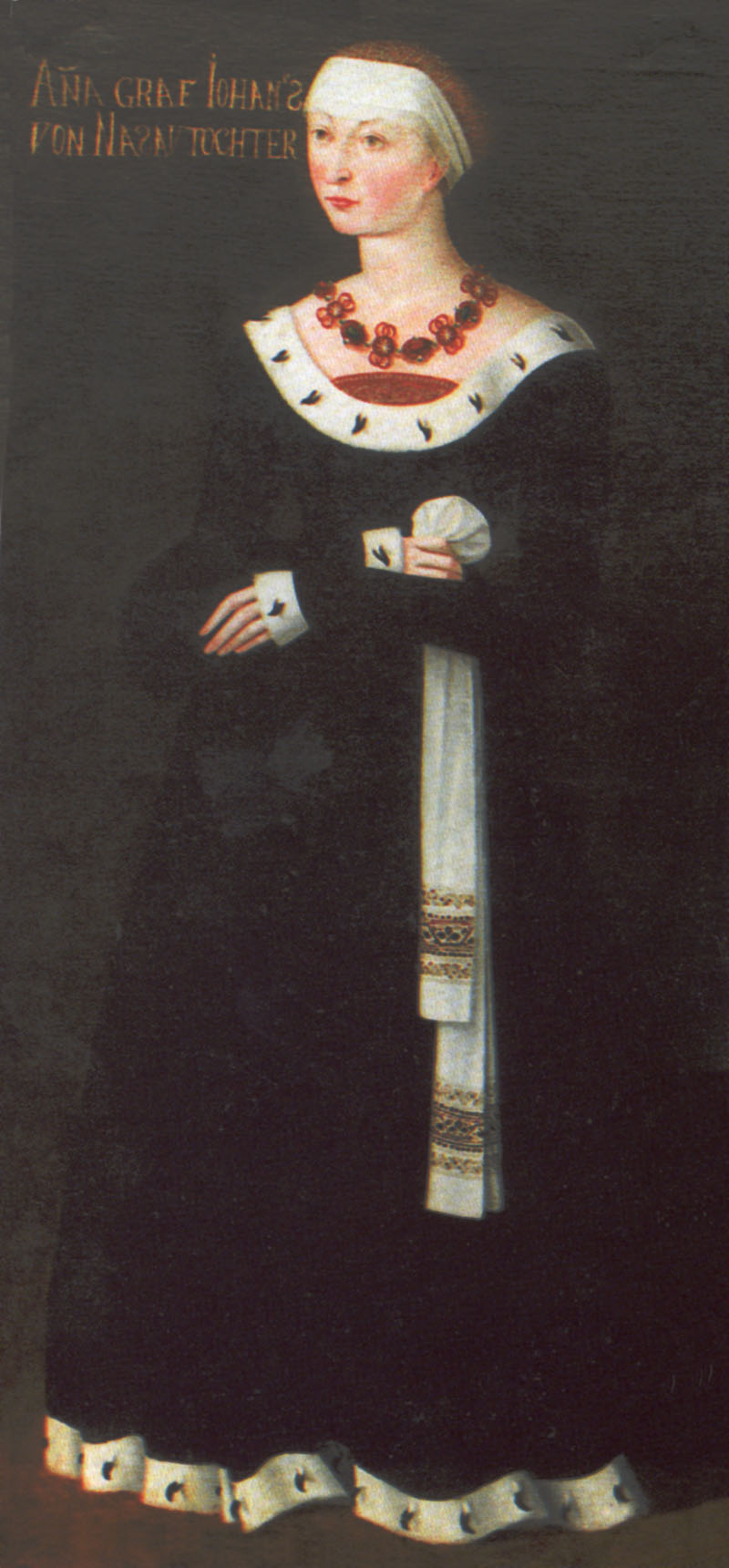
- Countess Anne of Nassau-Siegen. Anonymous portrait, c. 1460.

- Coat of arms
- Full name: Anne Countess of Nassau-Siegen
- Native name: Anna Gräfin von Nassau-Siegen
- Born: Anna Gräfin zu Nassau, Vianden und Diez, Frau zu Breda; 1440 or 1441
- Died: 5 or 8 April 1514; Celle
- Noble family: House of Nassau-Siegen
- Spouses: Otto II the Victorious of Brunswick-Lüneburg; Philip the Elder of Katzenelnbogen
- Issue Detail: Henry the Middle
- Father: John IV of Nassau-Siegen
- Mother: Mary of Looz-Heinsberg

Countess Anne of Nassau-Siegen (Note: In many sources she is called Anne of Nassau-Dillenburg. The County of Nassau-Siegen is erroneously called Nassau-Dillenburg in many sources. The county was not named after the small, unimportant city of Dillenburg, which did not even have a church until 1491, but after the, for that time, large city of Siegen, the economic centre of the county and the counts' main residence. See Lück (1981), passim. It is also evident from the numbering of the reigning counts with the given name John. One John without regal number who ruled the County of Nassau-Dillenburg in the period 1303–1328, and eight counts by the name of John who ruled the County of Nassau-Siegen in the period 1362–1638.) (1440 or 1441 – 5 or 8 April 1514), German: Anne Gräfin von Nassau-Siegen, official titles: Gräfin zu Nassau, Vianden und Diez, Frau zu Breda, was a countess from the House of Nassau-Siegen, a cadet branch of the Ottonian Line of the House of Nassau, and through marriage successively Duchess of Brunswick-Lüneburg and Countess of Katzenelnbogen. She acted as regent of the Duchy of Brunswick-Lüneburg for her son in the period of 1479–1486.

== Biography ==
It is not known where and when Anne was born, some reasons suggest that she was born at the end of 1440 or 1441. (Note: Schutte (1979), p. 41 and Katzenelnbogen, Anna Gräfin von state that she was born in 1440 or 1441. Katzenelnbogen, Anna Gräfin von also states that she was born in Dillenburg. The latter is very unlikely as her parents resided in Breda at that time according to Van Ditzhuyzen (2004), p. 152.) She was the eldest daughter of Count John IV of Nassau-Siegen and his wife Lady Mary of Looz-Heinsberg.

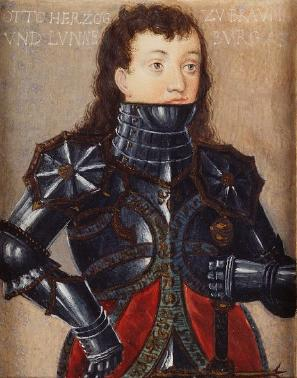
Duke Otto II the Victorious of Brunswick-Lüneburg, Anne's first husband. Anonymous portrait, 1595. Royal Collection.

Anne married on 28 October 1467 to Duke Otto II the Victorious of Brunswick-Lüneburg (1439 – January 1471 (Note: The date of death 8 or 19 January 1471 in Schutte (1979), p. 41, 8 January 1471 in Dek (1970), p. 69, 19 January 1471 in Vorsterman van Oyen (1882), p. 94, and 17 January 1471 in Spehr (1880), p. 492.)), who had succeeded his brother Duke Bernard II in 1464. As her dower she received the District of Lüchow. Anne already became a widow in January 1471. Her son Henry succeeded his father. As Henry was still a minor, he was under the custody and regency of his paternal grandfather Duke Frederick II the Pious, who had been in a monastery since 1457. Anne had her dower Lüchow Castle rebuild between 1471 and 1473.

Anne remarried on 24 January 1474 to Count Philip the Elder of Katzenelnbogen (1402 – 28 July 1479 (Note: The date of death 27 or 28 July 1479 in Schutte (1979), p. 41, and 27 June 1479 in Vorsterman van Oyen (1882), p. 94.)). Philip had previously married on 24 February 1422 to Countess Anne of Württemberg (d. 16 April 1471). From his first marriage Philip had three children. The eldest son, Philip the Younger, had married Anne's first cousin Ottilie of Nassau-Siegen, but died already in 1453. The second son Eberhard died three years later. Finally there was a daughter, Anne, who was married to Landgrave Henry III the Rich of Hesse-Marburg.

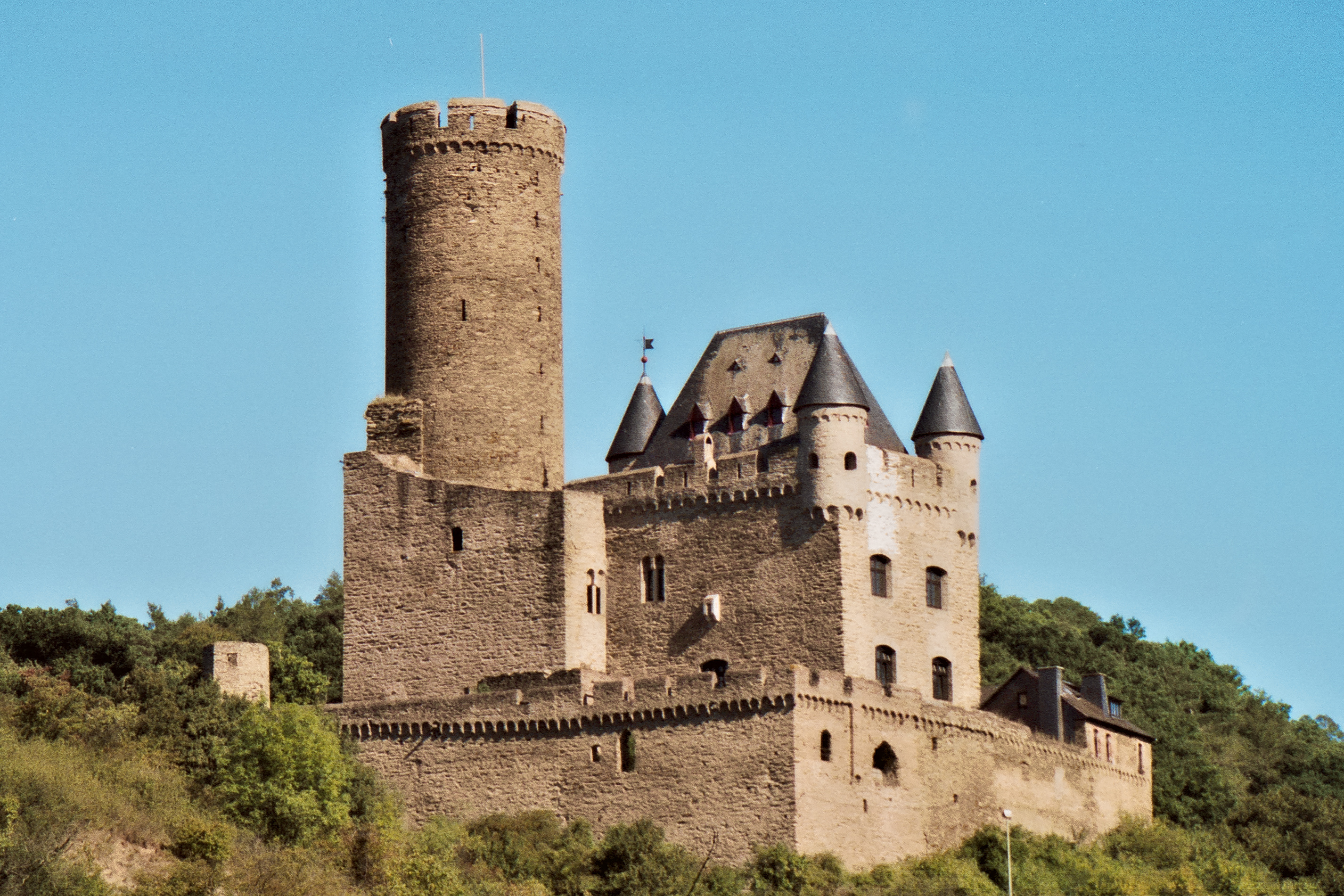
Burgschwalbach, Anne's dower in Katzenelnbogen. Photo: Johannes Robalotoff, 2004.

Anne's second marriage was arranged by Anne's parents with the cooperation of the estates of the realm of the County of Katzenelnbogen. If a son had been born from the marriage between the 72 years old Philip and the 32 years old Anne, the later seizure of the County of Katzenelnbogen by the Landgraviate of Hesse, which had its legal basis in the marriage of Philip's daughter Anne to Henry III of Hesse-Marburg, could have been avoided. This would have been entirely in the interest of the Counts of Nassau. The marriage contract stipulated that Anne should receive an annual income of 1600 guilders in interest and in kind as a dower. Philip assigned Burgschwalbach to his bride as her dower residence, together with the associated lordship and all rights of use; income derived from these lordship rights, for example from court fines and other fees, was not to be deducted from her other income. As a morning gift, Philip obligated himself to allocate her 200 guilders annually, which Anne was allowed to use as she saw fit after his death, for example for the salvation of her soul. In return, Anne was to bring an annual dowry of 400 guilders into the marriage. This dowry consisted of the income from her dower in the Duchy of Brunswick-Lüneburg, the District of Lüchow, which she leased for a sum of 666 guilders annually. For the first time, a firm will on the part of Anne becomes perceptible: as her father-in-law Duke Frederick the Pious and his councillors objected to the lessee she had chosen because they were at feud with him, Anne did not bow to the duke's wishes, but prevailed with regard to the lease agreement. When she left Celle and the Duchy of Brunswick-Lüneburg at the end of 1473, Anne left her five-year-old son in the care of her father-in-law and sister-in-law Margaret as the only female relative. This was customary and even legally binding for the children of a princely widow from her first marriage. After all, Henry was the sole heir to the duchy. What feelings moved Anne in this is unknown, and how the young duke experienced the departure of his mother, is also unknown.

Soon after her marriage to Philip, Anne became the pawn in her father's political intrigue. An attempt was made to poison her. A priest accused of multiple murders, Johann von Börnich, confessed that, at the instigation of close confidants of the Landgrave of Hesse, he had given her a goblet of poisoned wine at a service he celebrated in the chapel of Rheinfels Castle in Katzenelnbogen in January 1474, allegedly before the marriage. After she had drunk some of the wine, Anne fell ill; apparently she had been poisoned. All that is certain, however, is that she suffered from a fever and recovered quickly. The attending physician did not find any signs of poisoning. During the interrogation on the rack, Johann von Börnich accused Hans von Dörnberg, the Hofmeister of the Landgrave of Hesse, in particular. The Landgraviate of Hesse would inherit the County of Katzenelnbogen, and thus would benefit from Philip's heirless death and an untimely death of Anne. Because Anne's father instituted criminal proceedings against von Börnich, Hesse's reputation was dealt a heavy blow as an alleged instigator of murder.

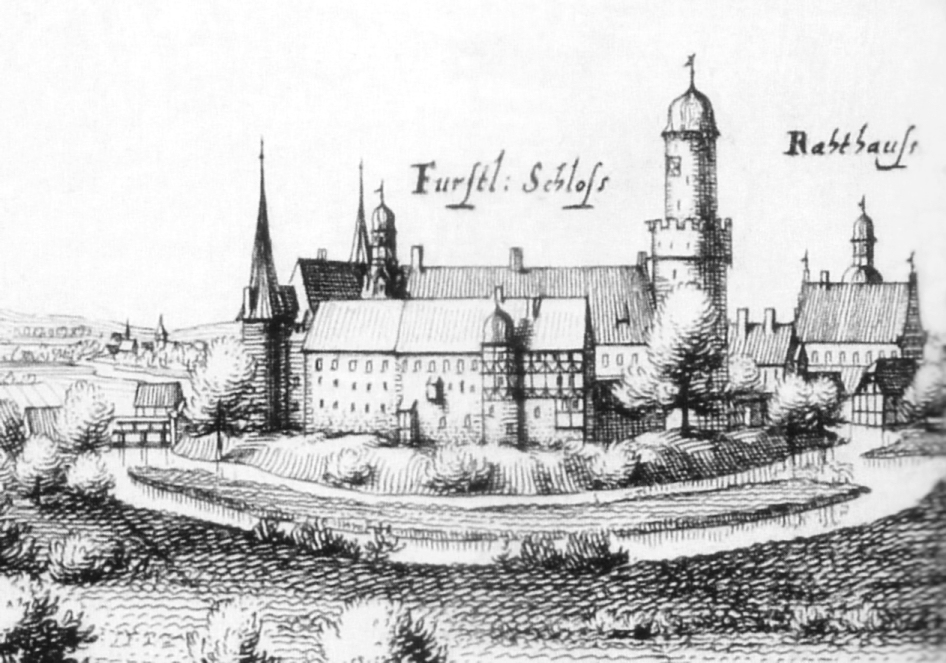
Lüchow Castle, Anne's dower in Brunswick-Lüneburg. Engraving by Matthäus Merian, 1654.

After Philip's death in 1479, Anne moved to her dower in Burgschwalbach and in the same year to Lüneburg and Celle. As her father-in-law Duke Frederick the Pious had died in 1478, Anne took over custody and regency for her son Henry, with the participation of secular and ecclesiastical councillors and the town council of the city of Lüneburg, in a wise and prudent manner. During her regency (1479–1486) Anne was able to reduce the duchy's debts and establish a sound financial administration. After her regency ended in 1486, Anne lived in her town house in Celle, and for a time also in her dower Lüchow Castle, but she also kept in touch with her old homeland and often stayed in Dillenburg or at the spa in Bad Ems.

A close relationship existed between Anne in Celle and her youngest brother Count John V. Based on the lively correspondence between them, it is even possible to reconstruct a trade exchange between the Duchy of Brunswick-Lüneburg and the County of Nassau-Siegen. In any case, Anne regularly sent her relatives in Siegen and Dillenburg fresh or smoked salmon, eels and other North Sea delicacies such as salted sturgeon and plaice, while John sent his sister cast iron pans from Siegen in return. An account from 1487 shows that on 13 July she was in Siegen, together with her brother John, to supervise the progress of the building activities of the Franciscan monastery he had founded there.

Anne died in Celle on 5 or 8 April 1514, (Note: The date of death 8 April 1514 in Dek (1970), p. 69, and 5 April 1514 in Vorsterman van Oyen (1882), p. 94, and Katzenelnbogen, Anna Gräfin von.) and was buried there.

== Issue ==
From the marriage of Anne and Otto the following child was born:

1. Duke Henry the Middle (15 September 1468 – Wienhausen, 19 February 1532). He married:
  1. in Celle on 27 February 1487 to Princess Margaret of Saxony (Meissen, 4 August 1469 – Weimar, 7 December 1528).
  2. around 1528 to Anna von Campe.

The marriage of Anne and Philip remained childless.

== Ancestors ==
Ancestors of Anne of Nassau-Siegen
| Great-great-grandparents | Otto II of Nassau-Siegen (c. 1305–1350/51) ⚭ 1331; Adelaide of Vianden (d. 1376) | Adolf II of the Mark (d. 1347) ⚭ 1332; Margaret of Cleves (d. after 1348) | John II of Polanen (d. 1378) ⚭ 1348; Oda of Horne (d. before 1353) | John II of Salm (d. after 1400) ⚭ after 1355; Philippa of Valkenburg (?–?) | John I of Heinsberg (d. 1334) ⚭ c. 1324; Catherine of Voorne (d. 1366) | William I of Jülich (d. 1362) ⚭ 1324; Joanna of Hainaut (1311/13–1374) | Bernhard of Solms (d. 1347/49) ⚭ ? (?–?) | Philip VI of Falkenstein (d. 1372/73) ⚭ before 1363; Agnes of Falkenstein (d. 1380) |
| Great-grandparents | John I of Nassau-Siegen (c. 1339–1416) ⚭ 1357; Margaret of the Mark (d. 1409) | | John III of Polanen (d. 1394) ⚭ 1390; Odilia of Salm (d. 1428) | | Godfrey II of Heinsberg (d. 1395) ⚭ 1357; Philippa of Jülich (d. 1390) | | Otto I of Solms (d. 1410) ⚭ Agnes of Falkenstein (c. 1358–1409) | |
| Grandparents | Engelbert I of Nassau-Siegen (c. 1370–1442) ⚭ 1403; Joanne of Polanen (1392–1445) | | | | John II of Looz-Heinsberg (d. 1438) ⚭ 1423; Anne of Solms (d. 1433) | | | |
| Parents | John IV of Nassau-Siegen (1410–1475) ⚭ 1440; Mary of Looz-Heinsberg (1424–1502) | | | | | | | |

== Literature ==
- Boehn, Otto von (1957). "Anna von Nassau, Herzogin von Braunschweig-Lüneburg". Niedersächsisches Jahrbuch für Landesgeschichte (PDF) (in German). Vol. Band 29. Hildesheim: August Lax Verlagsbuchhandlung. pp. 24–120.
- Demand, Karl E. (1955). "Die letzten Katzenelnbogener Grafen und der Kampf um ihr Erbe". Nassauische Annalen (in German). Vol. Band 66. Wiesbaden: Verein für Nassauische Altertumskunde und Geschichtsforschung. pp. 93–132.
- Halliday, Andrew (1820). A History of the House of Brunswick and Lunenburgh.

== Sources ==
- "Katzenelnbogen, Anna Gräfin von". Hessische Biografie (in German). 15 April 2021.
- Aßmann, Helmut & Menk, Friedhelm (1996). Auf den Spuren von Nassau und Oranien in Siegen (in German). Siegen: Gesellschaft für Stadtmarketing Siegen e.V.
- Becker, E. (1983) [1950]. Schloss und Stadt Dillenburg. Ein Gang durch ihre Geschichte in Mittelalter und Neuzeit. Zur Gedenkfeier aus Anlaß der Verleihung der Stadtrechte am 20. September 1344 herausgegeben (in German) (Neuauflage ed.). Dillenburg: Der Magistrat der Stadt Dillenburg.
- Brachthäuser, Christian (1 October 2016). "Kloster, Krypta, Kontroversen. Zum 500. Todesjahr des Siegener Landesherrn Johann V. Graf zu Nassau, Katzenelnbogen, Vianden und Diez, Herr Breda, Grimbergen und Diest (1455–1516)" (PDF). Universitätsstadt Siegen.
- Dek, A.W.E. (1970). Genealogie van het Vorstenhuis Nassau (in Dutch). Zaltbommel: Europese Bibliotheek.
- Van Ditzhuyzen, Reinildis (2004) [1992]. Oranje-Nassau. Een biografisch woordenboek (in Dutch) (3rd ed.). Haarlem: Becht. ISBN 90-230-1124-4.
- Huberty, Michel; Giraud, Alain & Magdelaine, F. & B. (1981). l'Allemagne Dynastique (in French). Vol. Tome III: Brunswick-Nassau-Schwarzbourg. Le Perreux: Alain Giraud. ISBN 2-901138-03-9.
- Lück, Alfred (1981) [1967]. Siegerland und Nederland (in German) (2nd ed.). Siegen: Siegerländer Heimatverein e.V.
- Schmidt, Heinrich (1969). "Heinrich der Mittlere". Neue Deutsche Biographie (in German). Vol. Band 8. Berlin: Duncker & Humblot. pp. 350–351. ISBN 3-428-00189-3.
- Schutte, O. (1979). "Genealogische gegevens". In Tamse, C.A. (ed.). Nassau en Oranje in de Nederlandse geschiedenis (in Dutch). Alphen aan den Rijn: A.W. Sijthoff. pp. 40–44. ISBN 90-218-2447-7.
- Spehr, Ferdinand (1880). "Heinrich der Mittlere, Herzog von Braunschweig-Lüneburg". Allgemeine Deutsche Biographie (in German). Vol. Band 11. Leipzig: Duncker & Humblot. p. 492.
- Streich, Brigitte. "Anna, die letzte Gräfin von Katzenelnbogen". Graf von Katzenelnbogen (in German).
- Vorsterman van Oyen, A.A. (1882). Het vorstenhuis Oranje-Nassau. Van de vroegste tijden tot heden (in Dutch). Leiden & Utrecht: A.W. Sijthoff & J.L. Beijers.

Anne of Nassau-Siegen House of Nassau-Siegen Born: 1440/41 Died: 5 or 8 April 1514
Regnal titles
| Vacant Title last held by Matilda of Holstein-Schauenburg | Duchess Consort of Brunswick-Lüneburg; 28 October 1467 – January 1471 | Vacant Title next held by Margaret of Saxony |
| Vacant Title last held by Anne of Württemberg | Countess Consort of Katzenelnbogen; 24 January 1474 – 28 July 1479 | Succeeded by Anne of Katzenelnbogen |
| Preceded by Frederick II of Brunswick-Lüneburg | Duchess Regent of Brunswick-Lüneburg; 1479 – 1486 | Son became of age |
