= Magdalene of Brandenburg (1412–1454) =

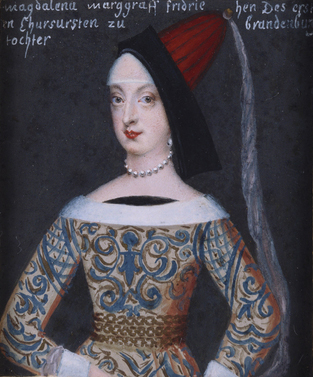
- Born: c. 1412
- Died: 27 October 1454; Scharnebeck
- Noble family: House of Hohenzollern
- Spouse: Frederick II, Duke of Brunswick-Lüneburg
- Issue: Bernard II; Otto V, Duke of Brunswick-Lüneburg; Margaret
- Father: Frederick I, Elector of Brandenburg
- Mother: Elisabeth of Bavaria

Magdalene of Brandenburg (born: c. 1412; died: 27 October 1454 in Scharnebeck) was a princess of Brandenburg by birth and by marriage Duchess of Brunswick-Lüneburg.

== Life ==
Magdalena was the daughter of Elector Frederick I of Brandenburg (1371–1440) from his marriage to Elizabeth (1383-1442 ), daughter of Duke Frederick "the Wise" of Bavaria-Landshut. Magdalene's brothers were Electors of Brandenburg, one after the other, first Frederick II, then Albrecht III Achilles.

She married on 3 July 1429 in Tangermünde with Duke Frederick II of Brunswick-Lüneburg (1418–1478). The marriage had been arranged by Emperor Sigismund, like the marriage of her sister Cecilia with Duke William "the Victorious" of Brunswick-Wolfenbüttel. Both couples were engaged on 3 March 1420. Magdalena brought a dowry of 10000Rhenish guilders into the marriage, for which Wichard von Rochow had vouched, and was promised Bodenteich Castle as her wittum, but later received the city and castle of Lüchow instead.

== Issue ==
From her marriage Magdalena had the following children:

- Bernard II (1432–1464), Duke of Brunswick-Lüneburg

married in 1463 Countess Mathilde von Holstein-Schauenburg (d. 1468)

- Otto V, Duke of Brunswick-Lüneburg (1438/39-1471), Duke of Brunswick-Lüneburg

married in 1467 Countess Anne of Nassau-Siegen (1440/41–1514)

- Margaret (1442–1512)

married in 1452 Duke Henry of Mecklenburg-Stargard (d. 1466)
