= Ernest, Elector of Saxony =

Elector of Saxony from 1464 to 1486

Ernest
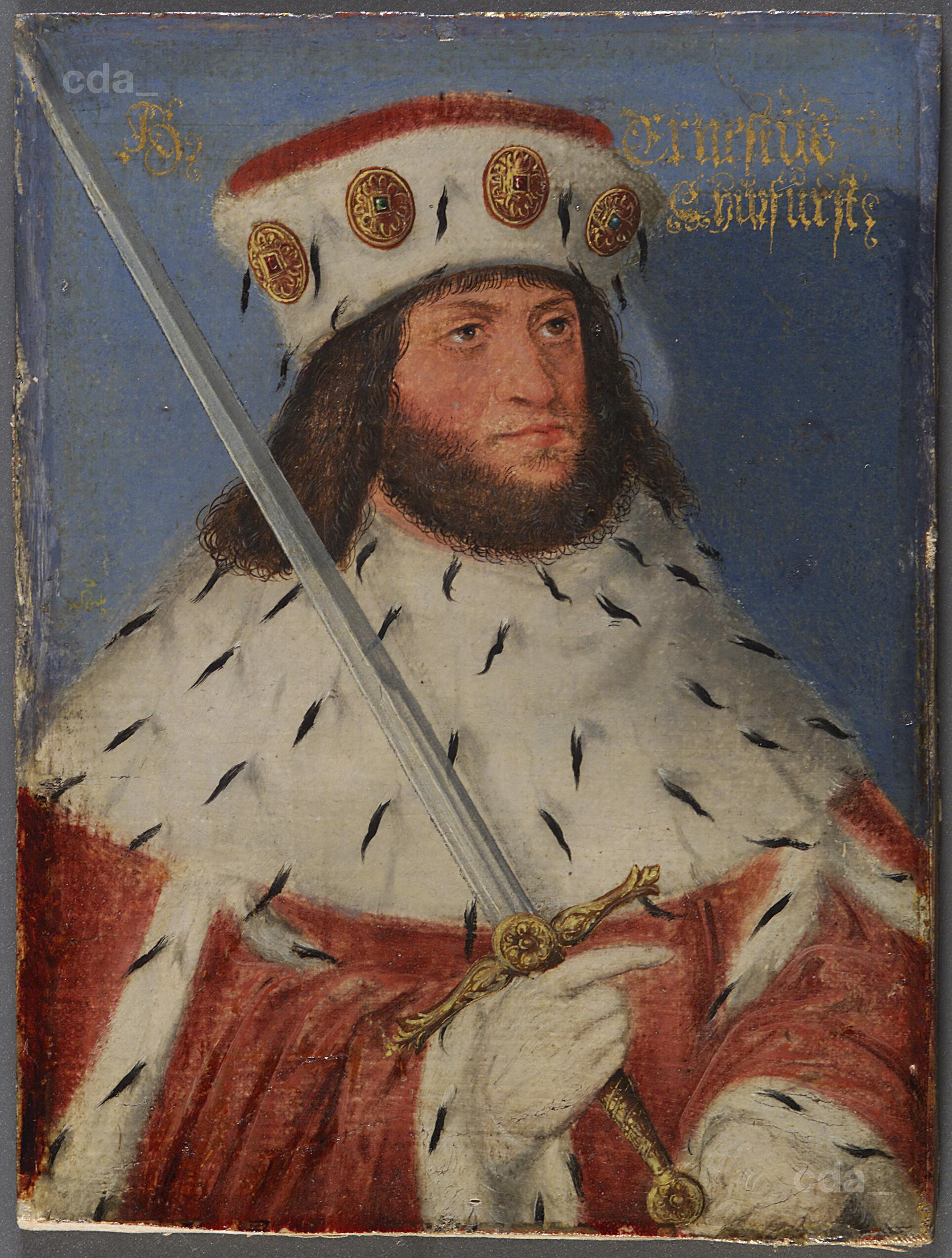
- Portrait by Lucas Cranach the Younger

Elector of Saxony
- Reign: 7 September 1464 – 26 August 1486
- Predecessor: Frederick II
- Successor: Frederick III

Landgrave of Thuringia
- Reign: 17 September 1482 – 26 August 1486
- Predecessor: William II
- Successor: Frederick VI
- Born: 24 March 1441; Meissen, Margravate of Meissen, Holy Roman Empire
- Died: 26 August 1486 (aged 45); Colditz Castle, Electorate of Saxony, Holy Roman Empire
- Burial: Meissen Cathedral
- Spouse: Elisabeth of Bavaria-Munich (m. 1460; died 1537)
- Issue Detail: Christina, Queen of Denmark; Frederick III, Elector of Saxony; Ernest, Bishop of Halberstadt; Adalbert III, Administrator of Mainz; John, Elector of Saxony; Margarete, Duchess of Brunswick-Lüneburg; Wolfgang of Saxony
- House: Wettin (Ernestine line) (Founder)
- Father: Frederick II, Elector of Saxony
- Mother: Margaret of Austria

Ernest (24 March 1441 – 26 August 1486), known in German as Ernst, was Elector of Saxony from 1464 to 1486. He established the Ernestine line of Saxon princes.

== Biography ==
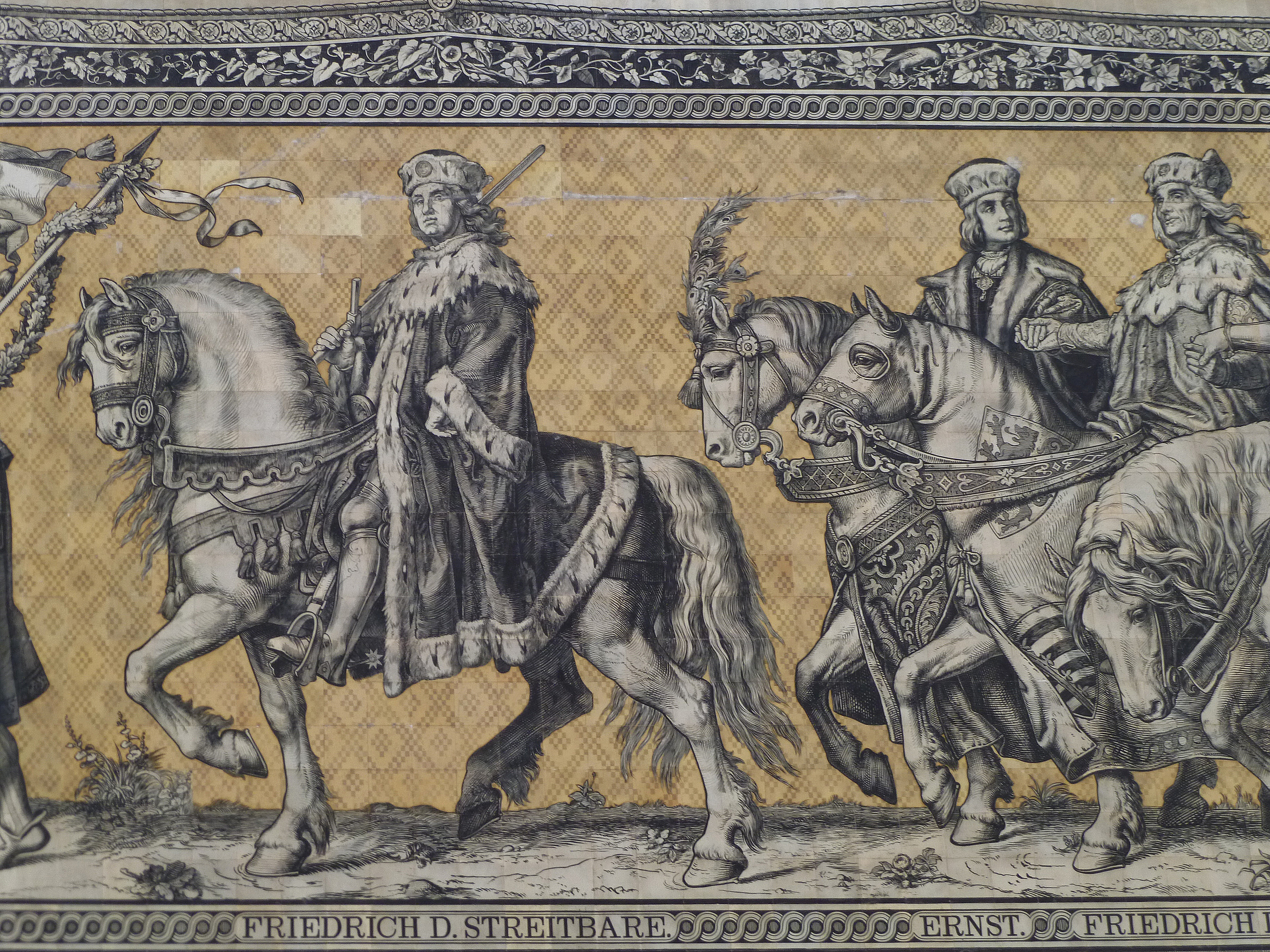
Frederick I, Elector of Saxony (1381–1428), Ernest, Elector of Saxony (1464–1486) and Frederick II, Elector of Saxony (1428–1464); Fürstenzug, Dresden, Germany

Ernst was born in Meissen, the second son (but fourth in order of birth) of the eight children of Frederick II, Elector of Saxony and Margaret of Austria, sister of Frederick III, Holy Roman Emperor. The death of his older brother Frederick (1451) made him the new heir apparent to the position of Elector of Saxony.

In 1455 Ernst was briefly kidnapped, along with his brother Albert, by the knight Kunz von Kaufungen an episode famous in German history as the Prinzenraub (i.e. The Stealing of the Princes).

In 1464, he succeeded his father as Elector of Saxony, and annexed Thuringia in 1482, and three years later (Treaty of Leipzig, 1485) shared his territory with his brother Albert, until he arranged the division of the common possession.

According to the Treaty of Leipzig he received an area around Wittenberg, the southern Thuringian part, the Vogtland and parts of the Pleissnerland. As a residence he selected Wittenberg. He provided for the welfare of the country and introduced the constitution.

One year after the division, Ernest died in Colditz, at the age of 45 years, the consequence of a fall from a horse.

== Children ==
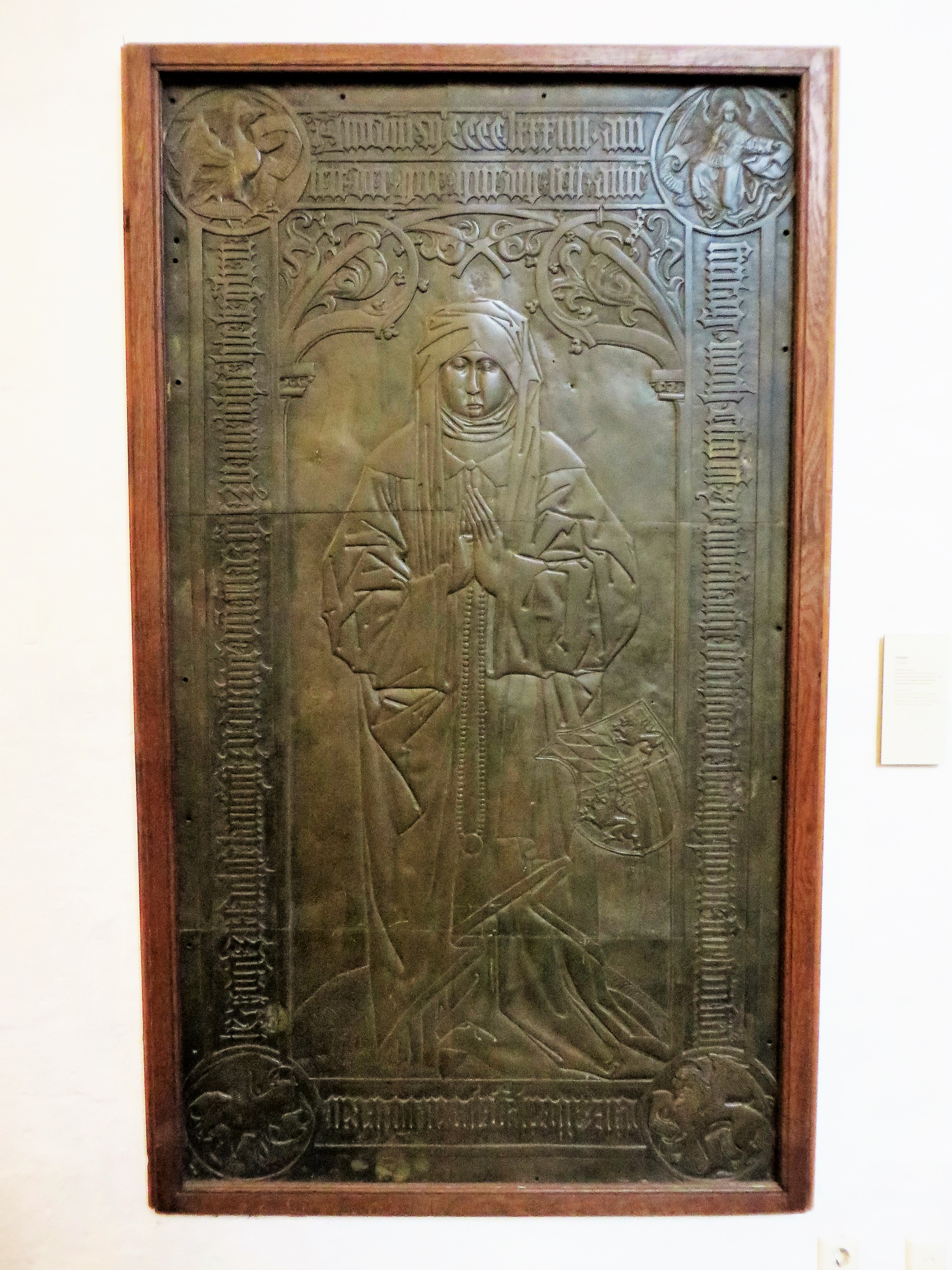
Ernest's wife, Elisabeth of Bavaria.

In Leipzig on 19 November 1460, Ernst married Elisabeth of Bavaria. They had seven children:

1. Christina (25 December 1461, Torgau – 8 December 1521, Odense), married on 6 September 1478 to King John I of Denmark
2. Frederick III, Elector of Saxony (17 January 1463, Torgau – 5 May 1525, Lockau)
3. Ernest (26 June 1464, Meissen – 3 August 1513, Halle), Archbishop of Magdeburg (1476–1480), Bishop of Halberstadt (1480–1513)
4. Adalbert (8 May 1467, Meissen – 1 May 1484, Aschaffenburg), Administrator of Mainz
5. Johann, Elector of Saxony (30 June 1468, Meissen – 16 August 1532, Schweinitz)
6. Margarete (4 August 1469, Meissen – 7 December 1528, Weimar), married on 27 February 1487 to Henry I of Lüneburg
7. Wolfgang (c. 1473, Meissen – c. 1478, Torgau).

== Ancestry ==
Ancestors of Ernest, Elector of Saxony

8. Frederick III, Landgrave of Thuringia
4. Frederick I, Elector of Saxony
9. Catherine of Henneberg-Schleusingen
2. Frederick II, Elector of Saxony
10. Henry the Mild, Duke of Brunswick-Lüneburg
5. Catherine of Brunswick
11. Sofie of Pomerania-Wolgast
1. Ernest, Elector of Saxony
12. Leopold III, Duke of Austria
6. Ernest, Duke of Austria
13. Viridis Visconti
3. Margaret of Austria
14. Siemowit IV, Duke of Masovia
7. Cymburgis of Masovia
15. Alexandra of Lithuania

== Sources ==
- Trim, David J. B. (2003). The Chivalric Ethos and the Development of Military Professionalism. BRILL. ISBN 978-9004120952.

Ernest, Elector of Saxony House of Wettin Born: 24 March 144126 August
Regnal titles
Preceded by Frederick II	Elector of Saxony; 1464–1486	Succeeded by Frederick III
Preceded by William II	Landgrave of Thuringia; 1482–1486	Succeeded by Frederick VI
