= Bernard II of Brunswick-Lüneburg =

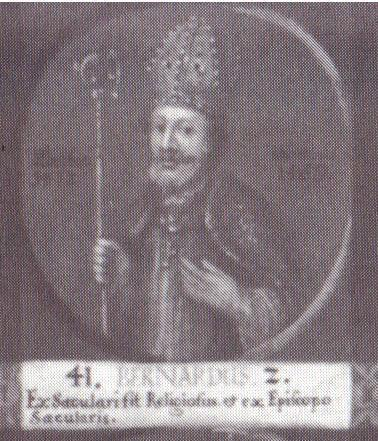
Bernard II, 41st bishop of Hildesheim

Bernard II, Duke of Brunswick-Lüneburg, (about 1437 – 1464) was the Bishop of Hildesheim (as Bernard III) from 1452 to 1457, as well as Prince of Lüneburg from 1457 to 1464.

== Life ==
Bernard was the son of Frederick the Pious and his wife Magdalene of Brandenburg. In 1452, Bernard was elected at the request of the Bishop of Hildesheim to be his coadjutor and later became his successor when the bishop died. However, the bishop's aspiration that in selecting a Welf the bishopric would strengthen its position vis-a-vis the Welf Principality of Brunswick-Wolfenbüttel proved elusive because Bernard felt obliged to support the interests of his family first. At the request of his father, he left the bishopric in 1457 to take over the Principality of Lüneburg, which he ruled jointly with his brother, Otto the Victorious, until his death on 9 Feb 1464. He married Matilda of Holstein-Schauenburg, daughter of Otto II, Count of Schauenburg-Pinneberg, in 1463, but the marriage was childless. Matilda went on to be the second wife of William the Victorious, Duke of Brunswick-Lüneburg.

== Ancestors ==
Ancestors of Bernard II of Brunswick-Lüneburg

8. Magnus II, Duke of Brunswick-Lüneburg
4. Bernard I, Duke of Brunswick-Lüneburg
9. Catherine of Anhalt-Bernburg
2. Frederick II, Duke of Brunswick-Lüneburg
10. Wenceslas I, Duke of Saxe-Wittenberg
5. Margaret of Saxony
11. Cecilia of Carrara
1. Bernard II, Duke of Brunswick-Lüneburg
12. Frederick V, Burgrave of Nuremberg
6. Frederick I, Elector of Brandenburg
13. Elisabeth of Meissen
3. Magdalene of Brandenburg
14. Frederick, Duke of Bavaria
7. Elisabeth of Bavaria-Landshut
15. Maddalena Visconti

== See also ==
- Duchy of Brunswick-Lüneburg
- Principality of Lüneburg
- Prince-Bishopric of Hildesheim

== Sources ==
- Die Diözese Hildesheim. In Vergangenheit und Gegenwart von Thomas Scharf-Wrede ISBN 3-7954-1721-X
- Geckler, Christa (1986). Die Celler Herzöge: Leben und Wirken 1371–1705. Celle: Georg Ströher. ISBN 3-921744-05-8. OCLC 255990175.
- Ferdinand Spehr (1875). "Bernhard von Braunschweig-Lüneburg" . Allgemeine Deutsche Biographie (in German). Vol. 2. Leipzig: Duncker & Humblot. p. 418.

Bernard II of Brunswick-Lüneburg House of Welf Cadet branch of the House of Este Born: about 1437 Died: 1464
German nobility
Catholic Church titles
Preceded by Magnus of Saxe-Lauenburg	Prince-Bishop of Hildesheim as Bernard III; 1452–1457	Succeeded by Ernest I of Schauenburg
Regnal titles
Preceded by Frederick II the Pious	Duke of Brunswick-Lüneburg; Prince of Lüneburg as Bernard II; 1457–1464	Succeeded by Otto V the Victorious
