= Henry I, Duke of Brunswick =

Duke of Brunswick-Wolfenbüttel (1468-1532)

Henry the Middle
- Duke of Brunswick-Lüneburg
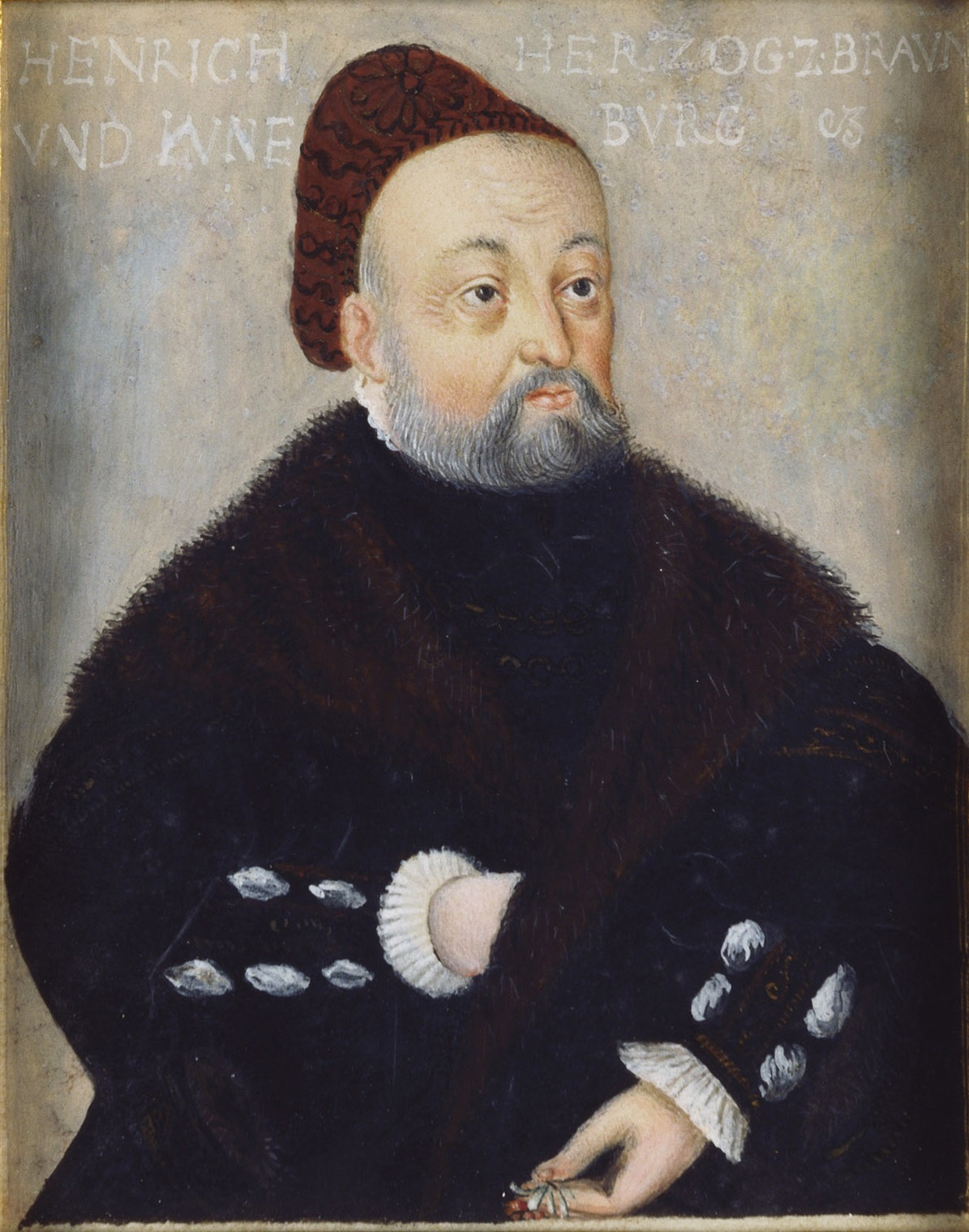
- Henry the Middle, Duke of Brunswick-Lüneburg
- Born: 15 September 1468; Lüneburg
- Died: 9 February 1532 (aged 63); Wienhausen
- Burial: Abbey of Wienhausen
- Spouse: Margarete of Saxony (m. 1487; died 1528): Anna von Campe (m. ?)
- Issue: Elisabeth, Duchess of Guelders; Otto I, Duke of Brunswick-Lüneburg-Harburg; Ernest I, Duke of Brunswick-Lüneburg; Duchess Apollonia; Anna, Duchess of Pomerania; Francis, Duke of Brunswick-Gifhorn; Franz Heinrich; Heinrich
- House: Welf
- Father: Otto V of Lüneburg
- Mother: Anne of Nassau-Siegen

Henry the Middle (15 September 1468 – 9 February 1532), also known as “Heinrich der Mittlere” in German, was a member of the House of Welf and ruled as the Duke of Brunswick-Lüneburg. His official title was Duke of Brunswick-Wolfenbüttel, a principality within the Holy Roman Empire. Henry earned the nickname “the Middle” to distinguish him from other Henrys in the Welf dynasty.

== Life ==
Henry of Brunswick-Lüneburg, the son of Otto V of Lüneburg and Anne of Nassau-Siegen, was born in 1468. In 1486, Henry took control of Lüneburg from his mother, who had been regent since the death of Henry's grandfather, Frederick II, Duke of Brunswick-Lüneburg. Henry's reign was marked by the complications relating to the Hildesheim Prince-Bishopric Feud. Henry was on the side of the bishop, and was against the nobility of Hildesheim and the Welfs of Brunswick. In 1519, Henry was victorious in the Battle of Soltau, though the intervention of the newly elected Emperor Charles V transformed the victory achieved on the battlefield into a defeat. Henry was on the side of the French during the election, and so earned the enmity of Charles V. Henry's two eldest sons became regents of the country, and Henry went into exile at the French king's court. Henry returned in 1527 during the beginning of the Reformation in Lüneburg, and tried to regain control of the land with help from those opposed to the Reformation. His attempt failed, and Henry returned to France, only to return in 1530. He spent his last days in the princely house in Lüneburg, which had been given to him by his eldest son. After the death of his first wife, Margaret of Saxony, Henry married, unequally, Anna von Campe. He was buried in the abbey of Wienhausen where his gravestone can still be seen today.

== Children ==
Henry and Margarete of Saxony (1469–1528) had the following children:

- Anne (1492–??)
- Elisabeth (1494–1572) m. Charles II, Duke of Guelders (1467–1538)
- Otto I (1495–1549)
- Ernest I the Confessor (1497–1546)
- Apollonia (1499–1571) Nun
- Anna (1502–1568) m. February 2, 1525 Duke Barnim IX of Pomerania (1501–1573)
- Francis (1508–1549)

From his second marriage to Anna von Campe he had two sons:

- Franz Heinrich, died young in France
- Heinrich, died young in captivity in Celle

== Literature ==
- Ferdinand Spehr: Heinrich der Mittlere. In: Allgemeine Deutsche Biographie (ADB). Bd. 11, Leipzig 1880, S. 492–495.

== Sources ==
- Whaley, Joachim (2012). Germany and the Holy Roman Empire. Vol. I: Maximilian I to the Peace of Westphalia, 1493–1648. Oxford University Press. ISBN 9780198731016.

Henry I, Duke of Brunswick House of Welf Cadet branch of the House of Este Born: 1468 Died: 19 February 1532
German nobility
Preceded by Frederick the Pious	Duke of Brunswick-Lüneburg; Prince of Lüneburg; 1479–1520	Succeeded by Ernest I and Otto
