= Otto V of Brunswick =

Otto V
- Duke of Brunswick-Lüneburg
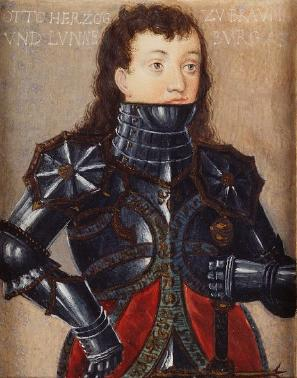
- Otto V the Victorious, Duke of Brunswick-Lüneburg (1439–71)
- Born: 1439
- Died: 9 January 1471
- Noble family: House of Guelph
- Spouse: Anne of Nassau-Siegen
- Issue: Henry the Middle, Duke of Brunswick-Lüneburg
- Father: Frederick II, Duke of Brunswick-Lüneburg
- Mother: Magdalena of Brandenburg

Otto V, known as the Victorious or the Magnanimous (1439 – January 9, 1471; in German: Otto der Siegreiche, der Großmütige), served as the Duke of Brunswick-Lüneburg and the Prince of Lüneburg from 1457 until his death. He ruled alongside his brother, Bernard, until Bernard died in 1464.

Otto and Bernard were the sons of Frederick II, Duke of Brunswick-Lüneburg, and succeeded him as ruling princes when Frederick retired. After Otto's death, his father returned to rule.

== Life ==
Otto was the son of Frederick II of Brunswick-Lüneburg and Magdalena of Brandenburg. After his brother died without issue, Otto took over the Principality of Lüneburg in 1464. Otto's reign was marked by the monastic reform movements of his time which he tried to implement in the Lüneburg monasteries. He entered Wienhausen Abbey, removed a number of art treasures which, in Otto's opinion were contrary to the ideal of monastic simplicity, and sent the abbess to be "re-educated in a monastery that was already reformed." According to a legend, Otto was killed at a tournament on the Celle jousting field. Today, a horseshoe in plaster marks the spot where Duke Otto the Magnanimous is supposed to have had the accident in 1471.

== Family ==
Otto married Anne of Nassau-Siegen in 1467. They had the following children:

- William (died 1470)
- Henry (c. 1467–1532)

== Ancestors ==
Ancestors of Otto V of Brunswick

8. Magnus II, Duke of Brunswick-Lüneburg
4. Bernard I, Duke of Brunswick-Lüneburg
9. Catherine of Anhalt-Bernburg
2. Frederick II, Duke of Brunswick-Lüneburg
10. Wenceslas I, Duke of Saxe-Wittenberg
5. Margaret of Saxony
11. Cecilia of Carrara
1. Otto V, Duke of Brunswick-Lüneburg
12. Frederick V, Burgrave of Nuremberg
6. Frederick I, Elector of Brandenburg
13. Elisabeth of Meissen
3. Magdalene of Brandenburg
14. Frederick, Duke of Bavaria
7. Elisabeth of Bavaria-Landshut
15. Maddalena Visconti

== Sources ==
- Geckler, Christa (1986). Die Celler Herzöge: Leben und Wirken 1371–1705. Celle: Georg Ströher. ISBN 3-921744-05-8. OCLC 255990175.

Otto V, Duke of Brunswick-Lüneburg House of Welf Cadet branch of the House of Este Born: 1439 Died: 9 January 1471
German nobility
Preceded by Bernard II	Duke of Brunswick-Lüneburg; Prince of Lüneburg; 1464–1471	Succeeded by Frederick II the Pious
