= House of Welf =

European royal dynasty

House of Welf (Guelf, Guelph)
- Parent house: Este (agnatic); Elder Welf (cognatic)
- Country: Germany, Italy, United Kingdom of Great Britain and Ireland
- Founded: 11th century
- Founder: Welf I, Duke of Bavaria
- Final ruler: Ernest Augustus, Duke of Brunswick
- Titles: List: Holy Roman Emperor; Emperor of Russia; Empress of India; King of the Romans; King of Great Britain; King of Ireland; King of Italy; King of Burgundy; King of Hanover; King of the United Kingdom of Great Britain and Ireland; Duke of Brunswick-Lüneburg; Duke of Brunswick; Duke of Bavaria; Duke of Saxony; Duke of Spoleto; Prince of Lüneburg; Prince of Brunswick-Wolfenbüttel; Count Palatine of the Rhine; Margrave of Tuscany; Elector of Hanover; Lord of Mann; Count of Paris
- Estates: Brunswick & Hanover
- Deposition: 1918; 108 years ago (in Germany)
- Cadet branches: House of Hanover

The House of Welf (also Guelf, Guelph or Welph) is a European dynasty that has included many German and British monarchs from the 11th century to the 20th century and Emperor Ivan VI of Russia in the 18th century. The originally Franconian family from the Meuse-Moselle area was closely related to the imperial family of the Carolingians.

== Origins ==
The (Younger) House of Welf is the older branch of the House of Este, a dynasty whose earliest known members lived in Veneto and Lombardy in the late 9th/early 10th century, sometimes called Welf-Este. The first member was Welf I, Duke of Bavaria, also known as Welf IV. He inherited the property of the Elder House of Welf when his maternal uncle Welf III, Duke of Carinthia and Verona, the last male Welf of the Elder House, died in 1055.

Welf IV was the son of Welf III's sister Kunigunde of Altdorf and her husband Albert Azzo II, Margrave of Milan. In 1070, Welf IV became Duke of Bavaria.

Welf II, Duke of Bavaria married Countess Matilda of Tuscany, who died childless and left him her possessions, including Tuscany, Ferrara, Modena, Mantua, and Reggio, which played a role in the Investiture Controversy. Since the Welf dynasty sided with the Pope in this controversy, partisans of the Pope came to be known in Italy as Guelphs (Guelfi).

The first genealogy of the Welfs is the Genealogia Welforum, composed shortly before 1126. A much more detailed history of the dynasty, the Historia Welforum, was composed around 1170. It is the earliest history of a noble house in Germany.

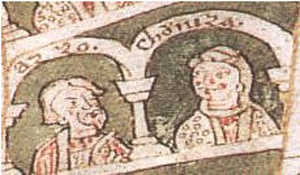
Kunigunde of Altdorf, sister of Welf III, wife of Albert Azzo II of Este, Margrave of Milan, parents of Welf IV

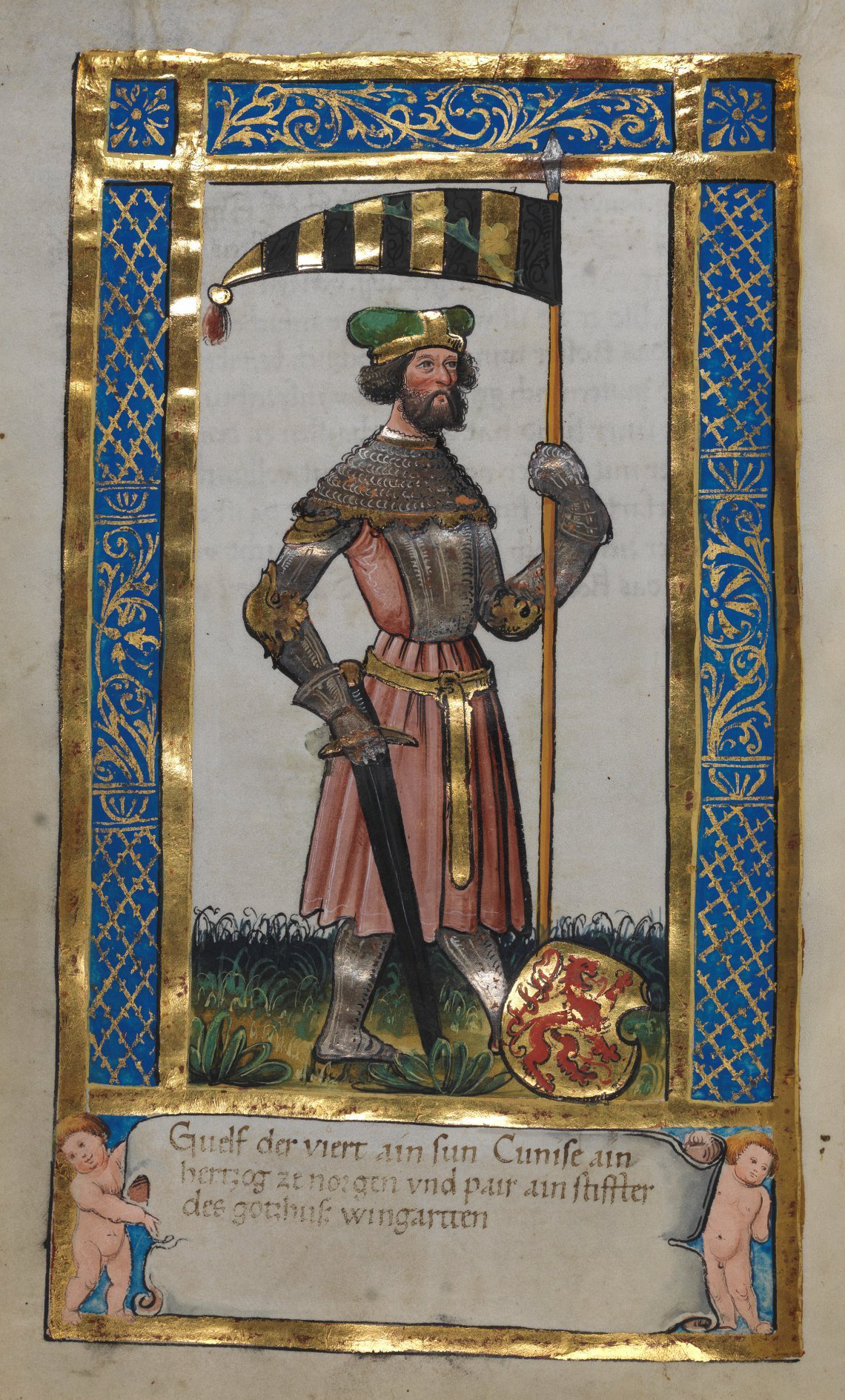
Welf I, Duke of Bavaria (c. 1030/1040 – 1101)

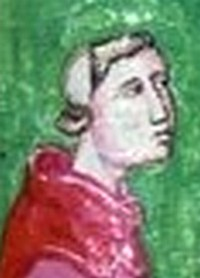
Welf II, Duke of Bavaria (1073–1120)

== Bavaria and Saxony ==
Henry IX, Duke of Bavaria, from 1120 to 1126, was the first of the three dukes of the Welf dynasty called Henry. His wife Wulfhild was the heiress of the house of Billung, possessing the territory around Lüneburg in Lower Saxony. Their son, Henry the Proud, was the son-in-law and heir of Lothair II, Holy Roman Emperor and became also Duke of Saxony on Lothair's death.

Lothair left his territory around Brunswick, inherited from his mother of the Brunonids, to his daughter Gertrud. Her husband Henry the Proud became then the favoured candidate in the imperial election against Conrad III of the Hohenstaufen. Henry lost the election, as the other princes feared his power and temperament, and was dispossessed of his duchies by Conrad III.

Henry's brother Welf VI (1115–1191), Margrave of Tuscany, later left his Swabian territories around Ravensburg, the original possessions of the Elder House of Welf, to his nephew Emperor Frederick I, and thus to the House of Hohenstaufen.

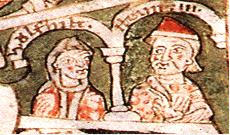
Henry the Black, duke of Bavaria (1075–1126) and his wife Wulfhild of Billung

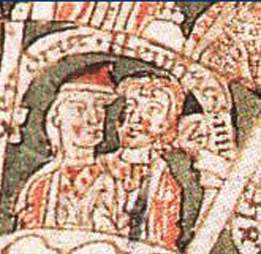
Henry the Proud (1102–1139), Duke of Bavaria and Saxony, and his wife Gertrud of Saxony, daughter of Lothair II, Holy Roman Emperor, Duke of Saxony

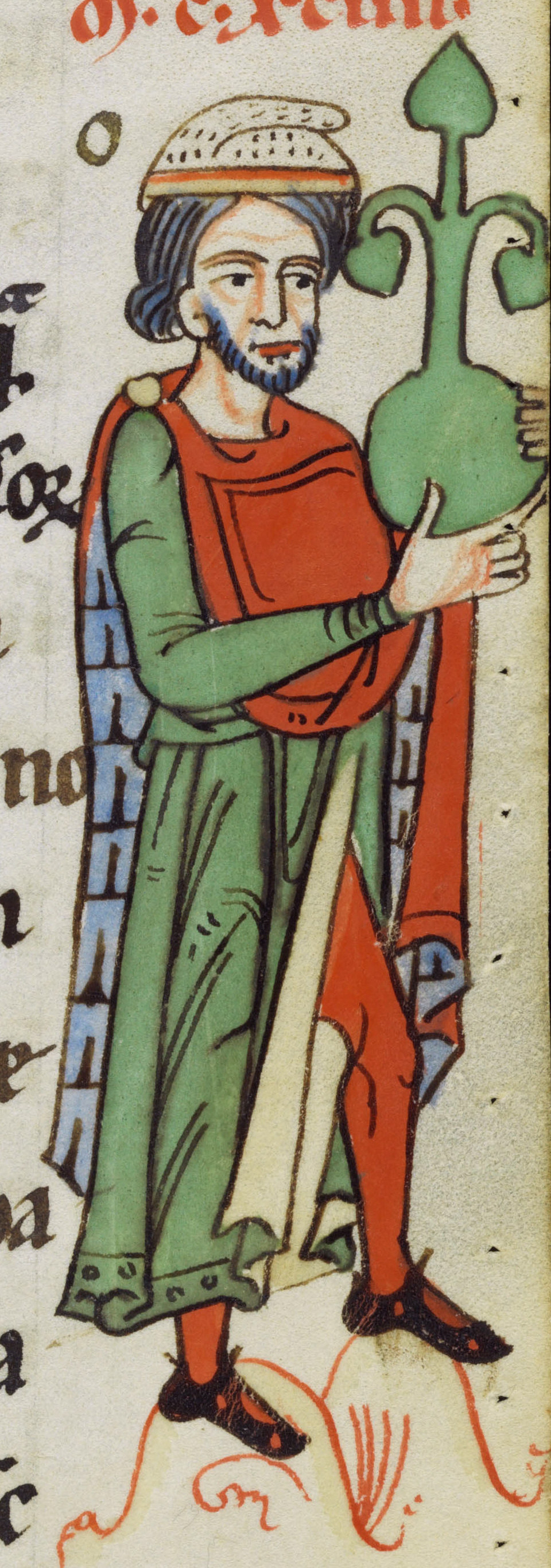
Welf VI (1115–1191), Margrave of Tuscany

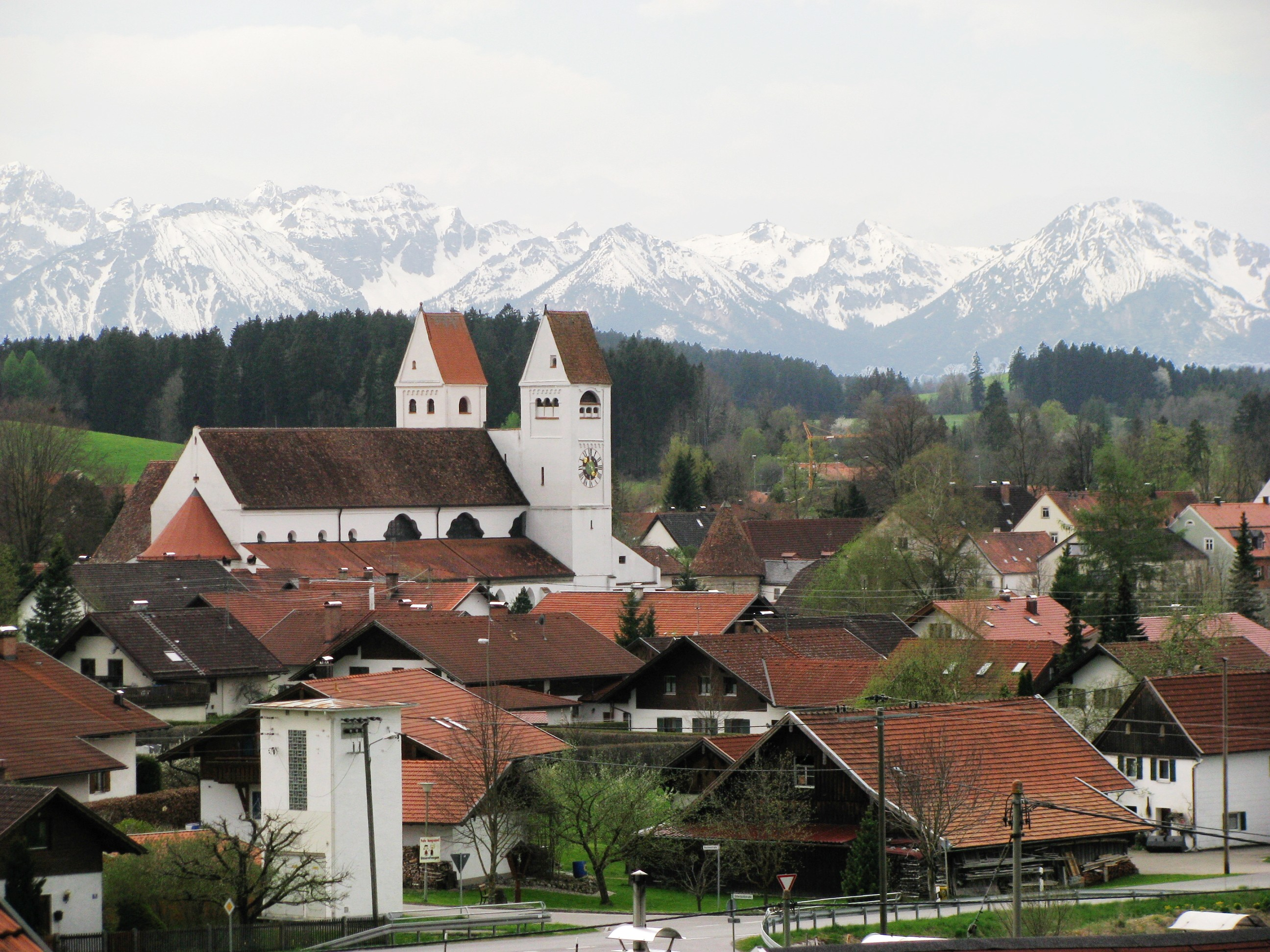
Steingaden Abbey, Swabia, place of burial of its founder Welf VI (d. 1191)

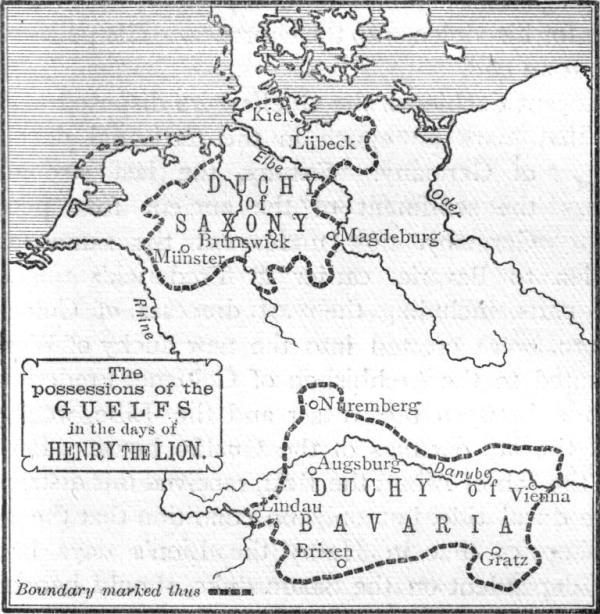
The possessions of the Welfs in the days of Henry the Lion

The next duke of the Welf dynasty Henry the Lion (1129/1131–1195) recovered his father's two duchies, Saxony in 1142, Bavaria in 1156 and thus ruled vast parts of Germany. In 1168 he married Matilda (1156–1189), the daughter of Henry II of England and Eleanor of Aquitaine, and sister of Richard I of England, gaining ever more influence. His first cousin, Frederick I, Holy Roman Emperor of the Hohenstaufen dynasty, tried to get along with him, but when Henry refused to assist him once more in an Italian war campaign, conflict became inevitable.

Dispossessed of his duchies after the Battle of Legnano in 1176 by Emperor Frederick I and the other princes of the German Empire eager to claim parts of his vast territories, he was exiled to the court of his father-in-law Henry II in Normandy in 1180. He returned to Germany three years later.

Henry made his peace with the Hohenstaufen Emperor in 1185 and returned to his much diminished lands around Brunswick without recovering his two duchies. Bavaria had been given to Otto I, Duke of Bavaria, and the Duchy of Saxony was divided between the Archbishop of Cologne, the House of Ascania and others. Henry died at Brunswick in 1195.

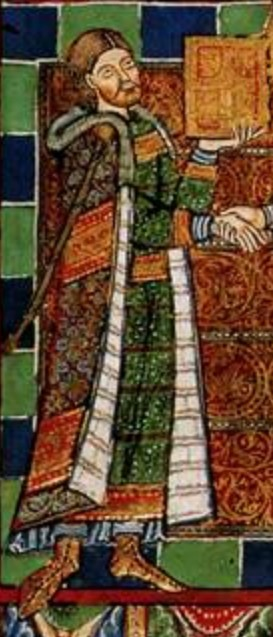
Henry the Lion (1130–1195), Duke of Bavaria and Saxony

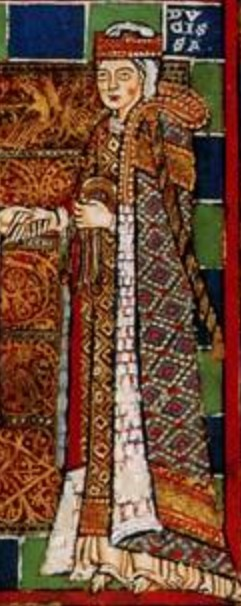
Matilda Plantagenet (1156–1189), wife of Henry the Lion, sister of Richard I of England

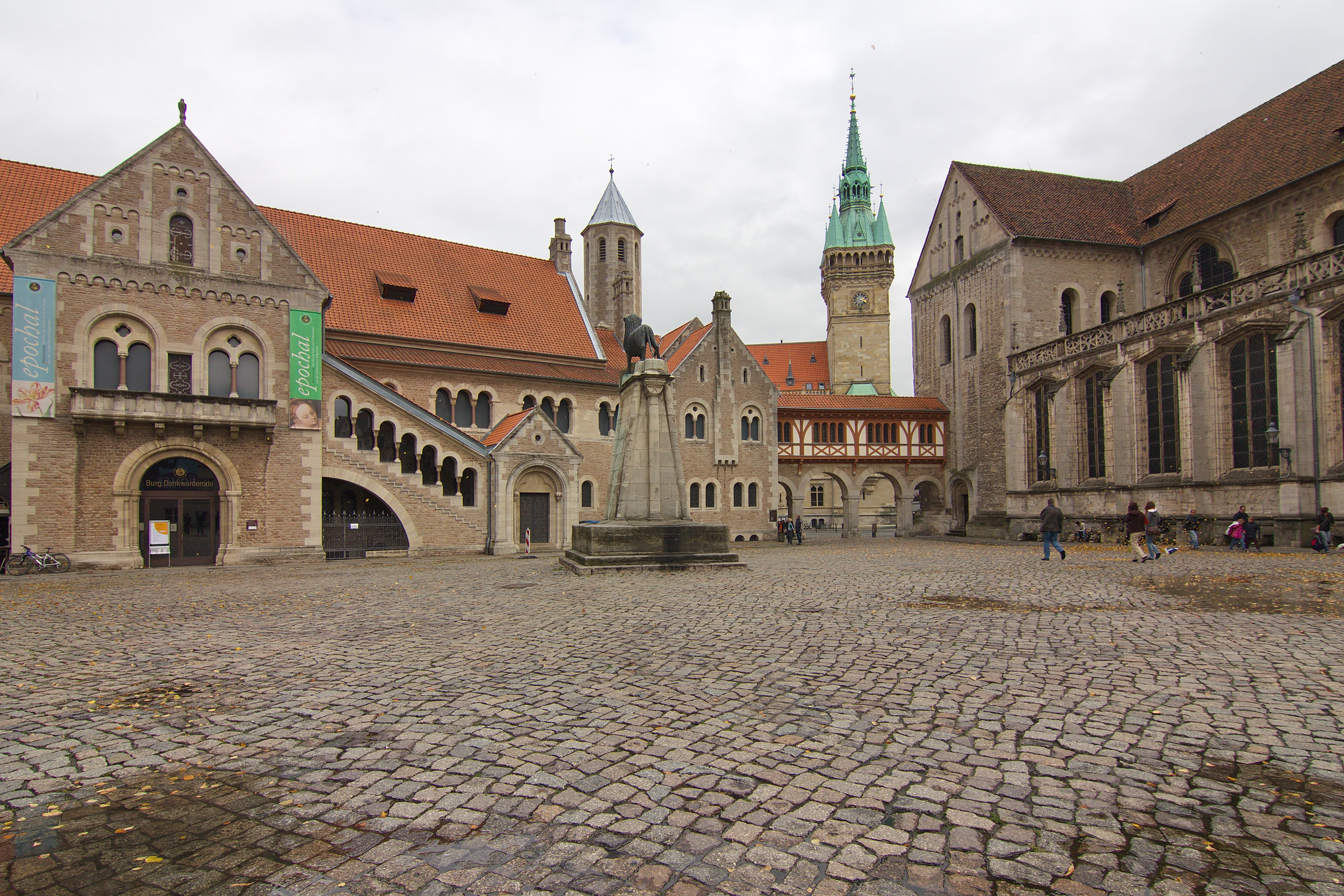
Henry's Dankwarderode Castle in Brunswick

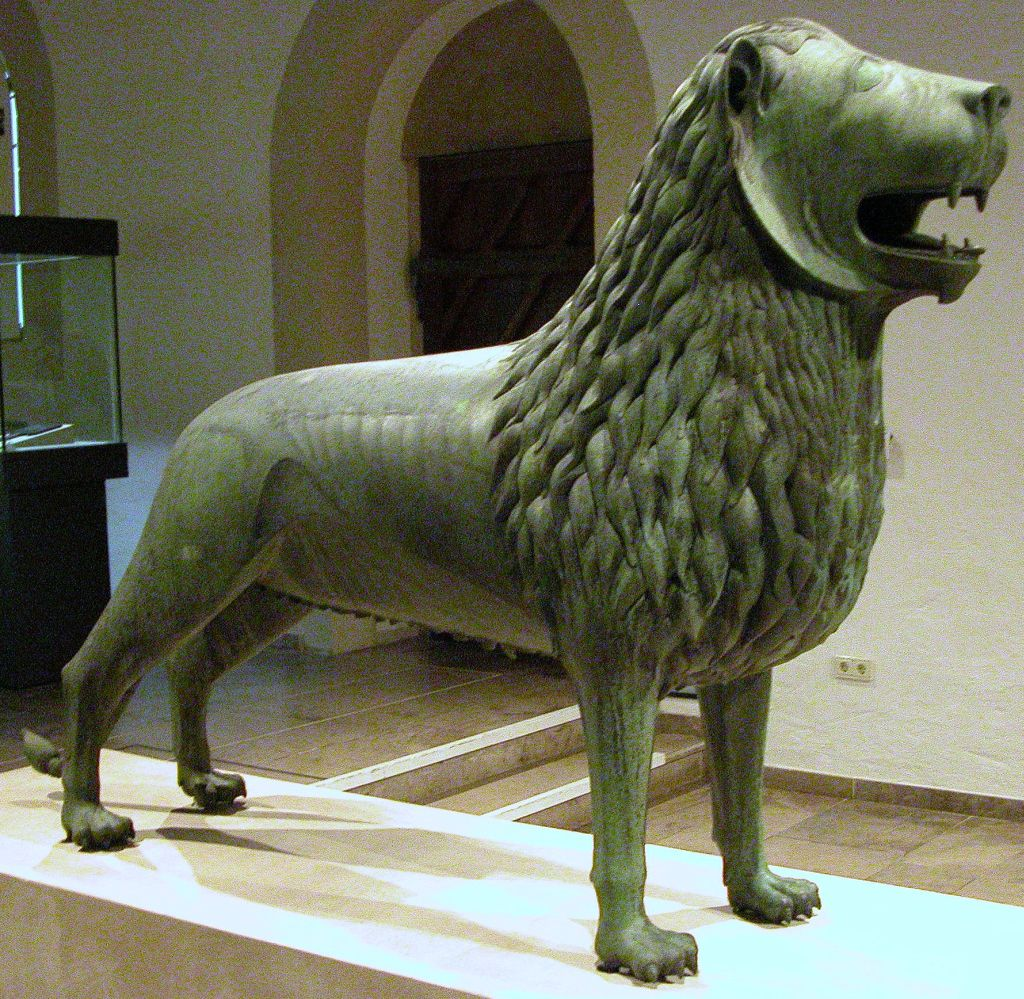
Henry's Brunswick Lion

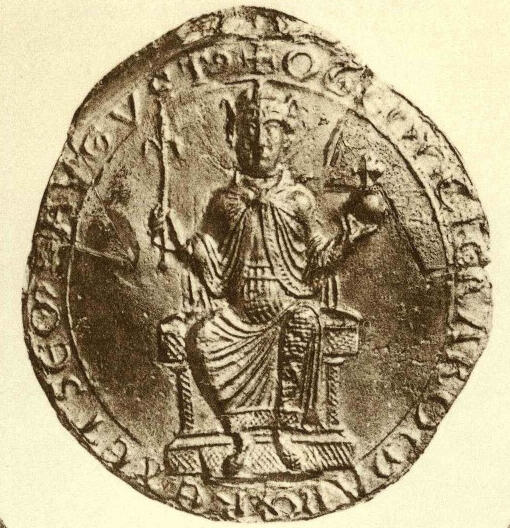
Otto IV, Holy Roman Emperor, son of Henry the Lion and Matilda of England

== Brunswick and Hanover ==
Henry the Lion's son, Otto of Brunswick, was elected King of the Romans and crowned Holy Roman Emperor Otto IV after years of further conflicts with the Hohenstaufen emperors. He incurred the wrath of Pope Innocent III and was excommunicated in 1215. Otto was forced to abdicate the imperial throne by the Hohenstaufen Frederick II. He was the only Welf to become Holy Roman Emperor.

Coat-of-arms of the Duchy of Brunswick-Lüneburg

Henry the Lion's grandson Otto the Child became duke of a part of Saxony in 1235, the new Duchy of Brunswick-Lüneburg, and died there in 1252. The duchy was divided several times during the High Middle Ages amongst various lines of the House of Welf. The subordinate states had the legal status of principalities within the duchy, which remained as an undivided imperial fief. Each state was generally named after the ruler's residence, e.g., the rulers of Brunswick-Wolfenbüttel originally lived in Wolfenbüttel.

Whenever a branch of the family died out in the male line, the territory was given to another line, as the duchy remained enfeoffed to the family as a whole rather than its individual members. All members of the House of Welf, male or female, bore the title Duke/Duchess of Brunswick-Lüneburg in addition to the style of the subordinate principality. By 1705, the subordinate principalities had taken their final form as the Electorate of Hanover and the Principality of Brunswick-Wolfenbüttel, and these would become the Kingdom of Hanover and the Duchy of Brunswick after the Congress of Vienna in 1815.

=== Principality of Brunswick-Wolfenbüttel ===
In 1269 the Principality of Brunswick was formed following the first division of the Duchy of Brunswick-Lüneburg. In 1432, as a result of increasing tensions with the townsfolk of Brunswick, the Brunswick Line moved their residence to Wolfenbüttel Castle, thus the name Wolfenbüttel became the unofficial name of this principality. With Ivan VI of Russia the Brunswick line even had a short intermezzo on the Russian imperial throne in 1740. Not until 1754 was the residence moved back to Brunswick, into the new Brunswick Palace. In 1814 the principality became the Duchy of Brunswick, ruled by the senior branch of the House of Welf.

=== Principality of Calenberg – later Electorate of Brunswick-Lüneburg ===
Coat of Arms of the Electorate of Brunswick-Lüneburg (1708)

In 1432 the estates gained by the Principality of Brunswick-Wolfenbüttel between the Deister and Leine split away as the Principality of Calenberg. In 1495 it was expanded around Göttingen and in 1584 went back to the Wolfenbüttel Line. In 1634, as a result of inheritance distributions, it went to the House of Luneburg residing at Celle Castle. In 1635 it was given to George, younger brother of Prince Ernest II of Lüneburg, who chose Hanover as his residence.

New territory was added in 1665, and in 1705 the Principality of Luneburg was taken over by the Hanoverians. In 1692 Duke Ernest Augustus from the Calenberg-Hanover Line acquired the right to be a prince-elector of the Holy Roman Empire as the Prince-Elector of Brunswick-Lüneburg. Colloquially the Electorate was known as the Electorate of Hanover. In 1814 it was succeeded by the Kingdom of Hanover.

=== British succession ===
Religion-driven politics placed Ernest Augustus's wife Sophia of the Palatinate in the line of succession to the British crown by the Act of Settlement 1701, written to ensure a Protestant succession to the thrones of Scotland and England at a time when anti-Catholic sentiment ran high in much of Northern Europe and Great Britain. Sophia died shortly before her first cousin once removed, Anne, Queen of Great Britain, the last sovereign of the House of Stuart.

Sophia's son George I succeeded Queen Anne and formed a personal union from 1714 between the British crown and the Electorate of Hanover, which lasted until well after the end of the Napoleonic Wars more than a century later, through the dissolution of the Holy Roman Empire and the rise of a new successor kingdom. The British royal family became known as the House of Hanover.

Coat of arms of the Hanoverian Kings of Great Britain (1714–1801)

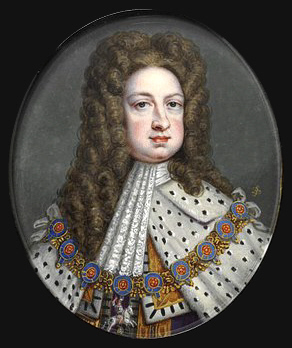
George I (1714–1727)

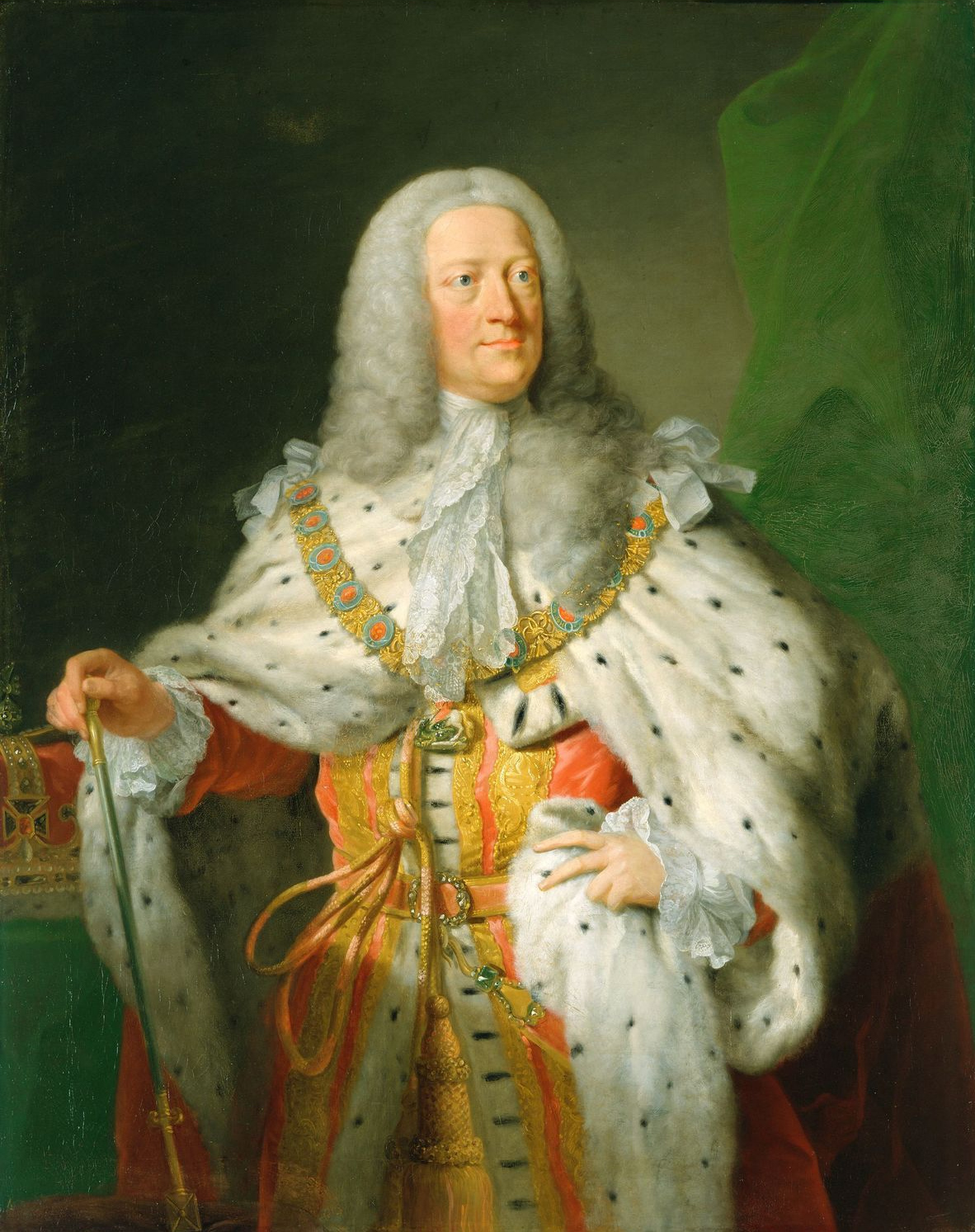
George II (1727–1760)

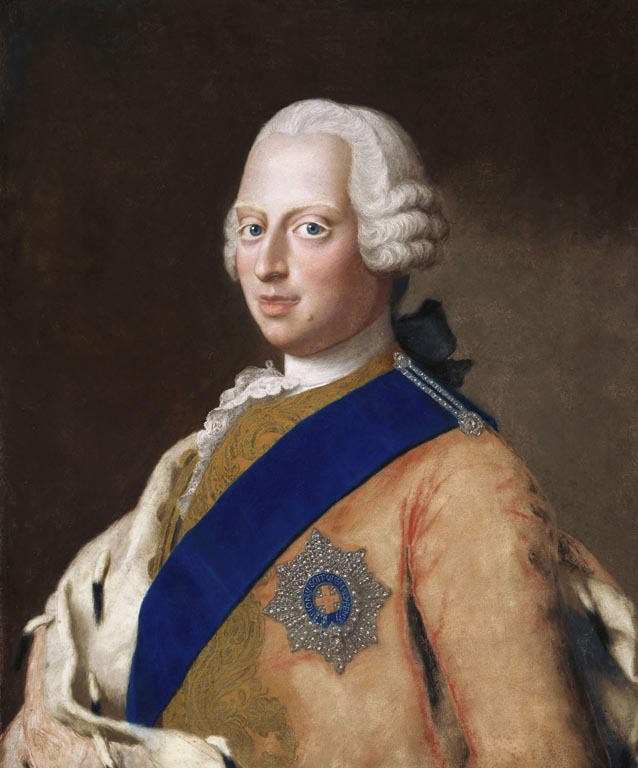
Frederick, Prince of Wales (b. 1707 d. 1751)

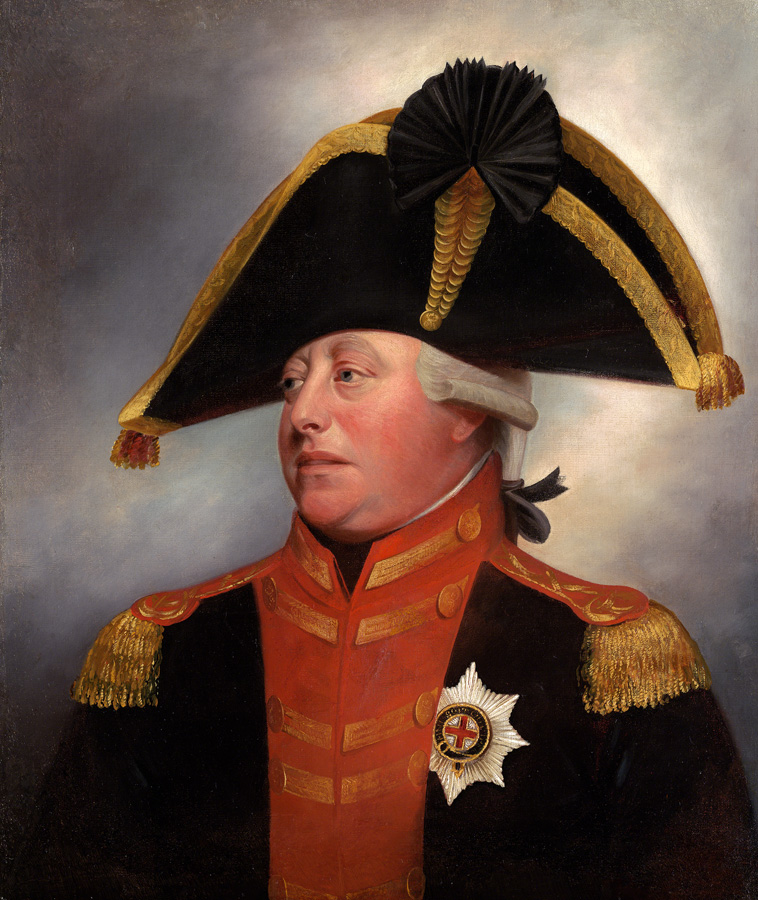
George III (1760–1820)

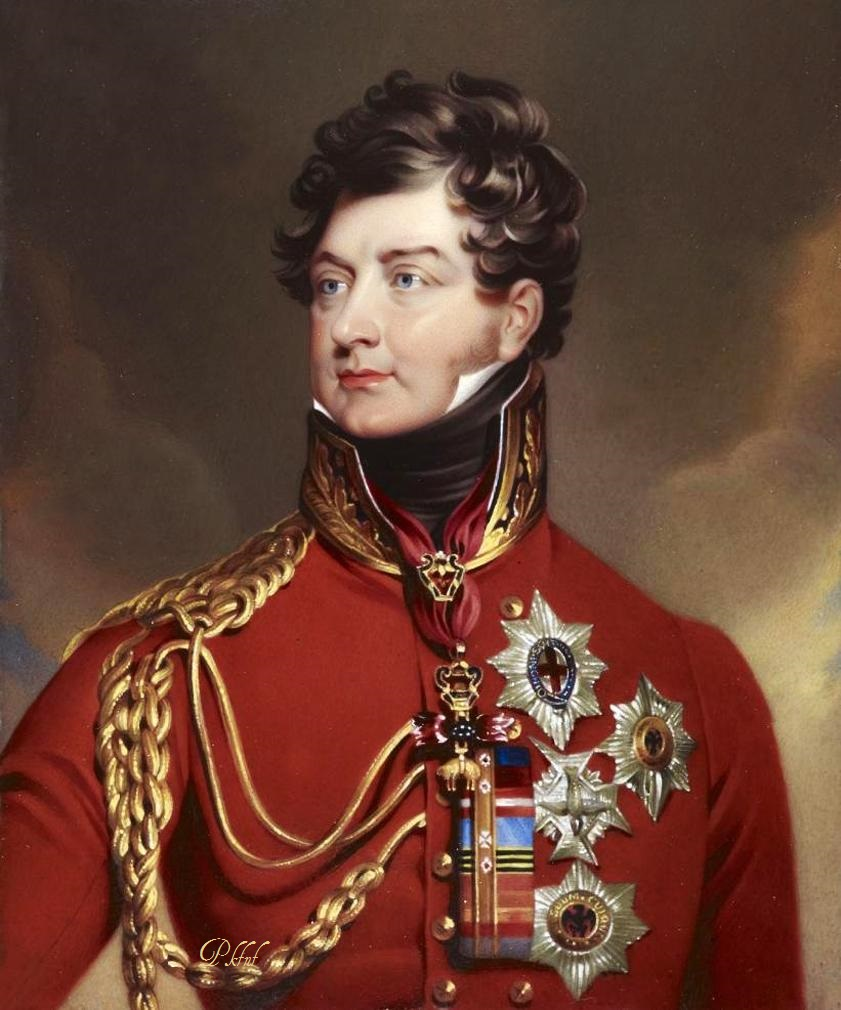
George IV (1820–1830)

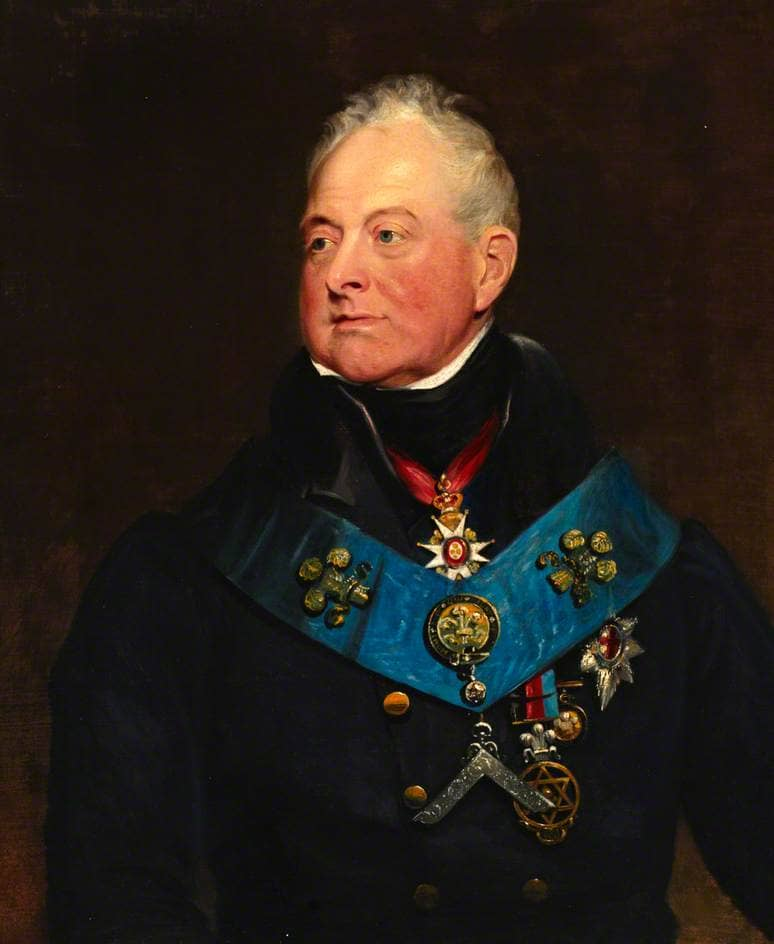
William IV (1830–1837)

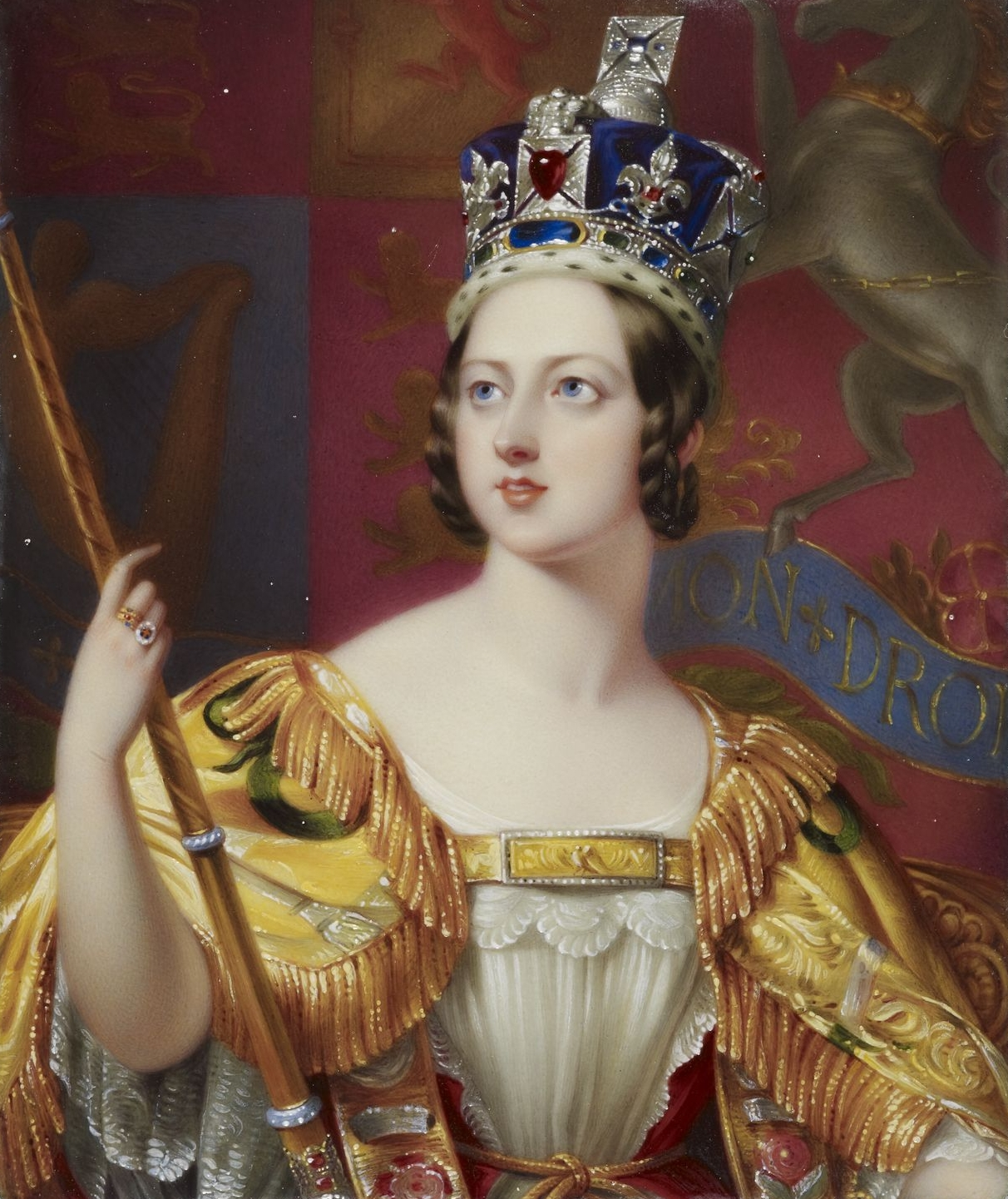
Victoria (1837–1901)

=== Kingdom of Hanover ===
The "Electorate of Hanover" (the core duchy) was enlarged with the addition of other lands and became the Kingdom of Hanover in 1814 at the Congress of Vienna. During the first half of the nineteenth century, the Kingdom was ruled as personal union by the British crown from its creation under George III of the United Kingdom, the last elector of Hanover until the death of William IV in 1837.

At that point, the crown of Hanover went to William's younger brother, Ernest Augustus, Duke of Cumberland and Teviotdale under the Salic law requiring the next male heir to inherit, whereas the British throne was inherited by an elder brother's only daughter, Queen Victoria. Her offspring belong to the House of Saxe-Coburg and Gotha: in 1917 the name was changed to the House of Windsor.

The Kingdom of Hanover was lost in 1866 by Ernest Augustus's son George V of Hanover, Austria's ally during the Austro-Prussian War, when it was annexed by Prussia after Austria's defeat and became the Prussian province of Hanover. The Welfs went into exile at Gmunden, Austria, where they built Cumberland Castle.

Coat of arms of the kingdom of Hanover 1837

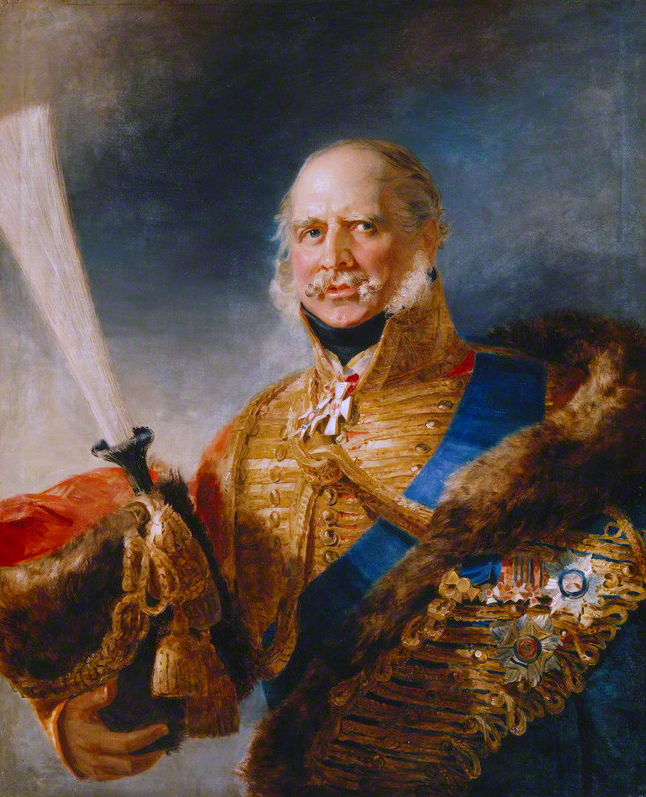
Ernest Augustus, King of Hanover

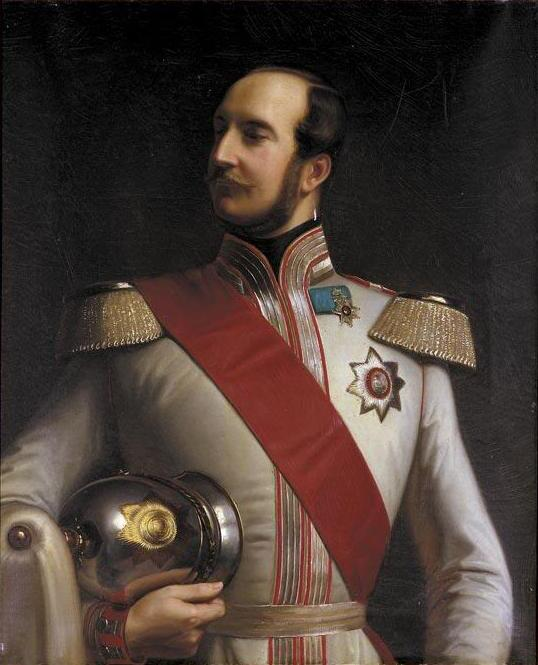
King George V of Hanover

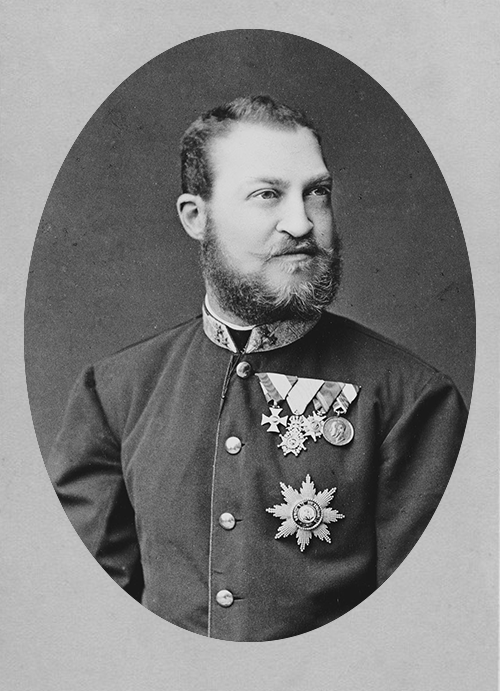
Ernst August, Crown Prince of Hannover

=== Brunswick succession ===
Coat-of-arms of the Duchy of Brunswick

Ernest Augustus, Duke of Brunswick and Wolfenbüttel, 1913-1918

The senior line of the dynasty had ruled the much smaller principality of Brunswick-Wolfenbüttel, created the sovereign Duchy of Brunswick in 1814. This line became extinct in 1884. Although the Duchy should have been inherited by the Duke of Cumberland, son of the last king of Hanover, Prussian suspicions of his loyalty led the duchy's throne to remain vacant until 1913, when the Duke of Cumberland's son, Ernst August, married the daughter of Kaiser Wilhelm II and was allowed to inherit it. His rule there was short-lived, as the monarchy came to an end following the First World War in 1918.

=== Welf Dynasty Today ===
The Welf dynasty continues to exist. The last member sitting on a European throne was Frederica of Hanover, daughter of Ernest Augustus, the last Duke of Brunswick, was the Queen of Greece († 1981), mother of Queen Sofía of Spain and King Constantine II of Greece. Frederica's brother Prince George William of Hanover married Princess Sophie of Greece and Denmark, sister of Prince Philip, Duke of Edinburgh. The House's head is Queen Frederica's nephew Ernst August, the third and present husband of Princess Caroline of Monaco.

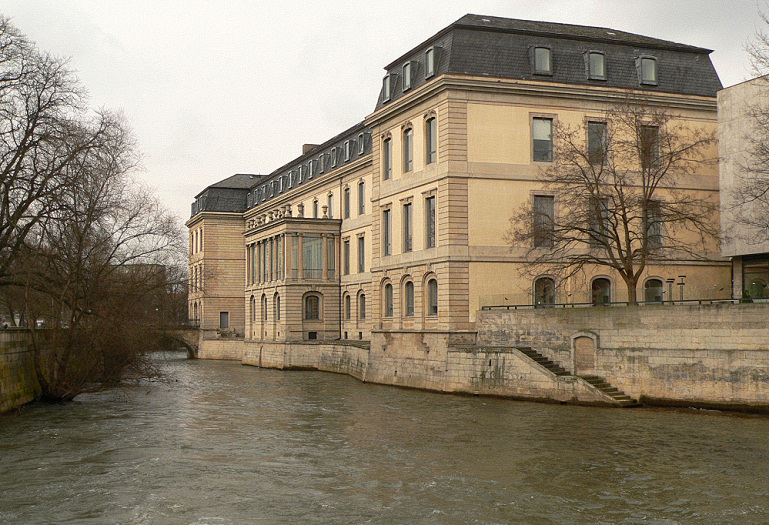
The Leine Palace in Hanover

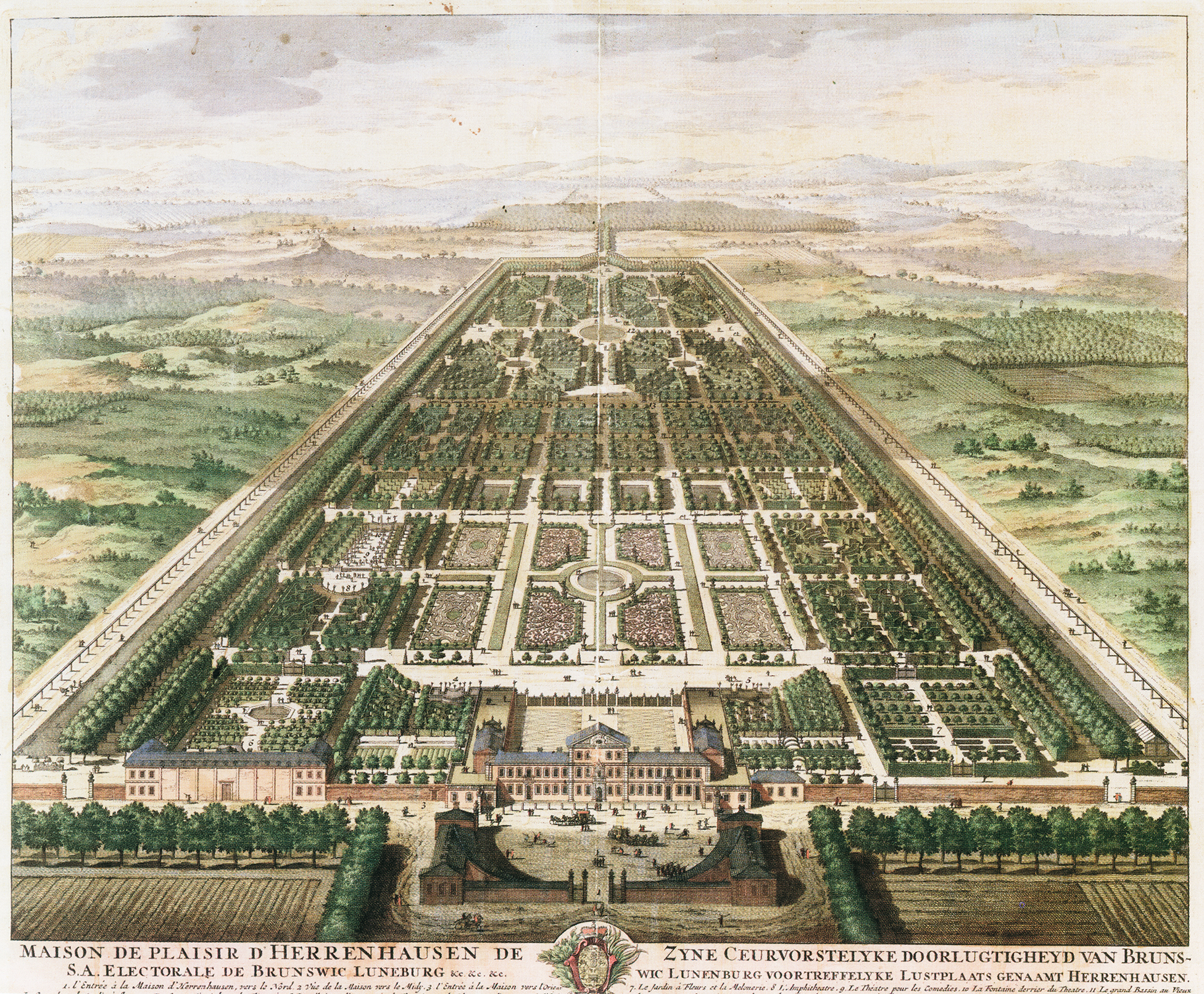
Herrenhausen Palace and Herrenhausen Gardens in Hanover

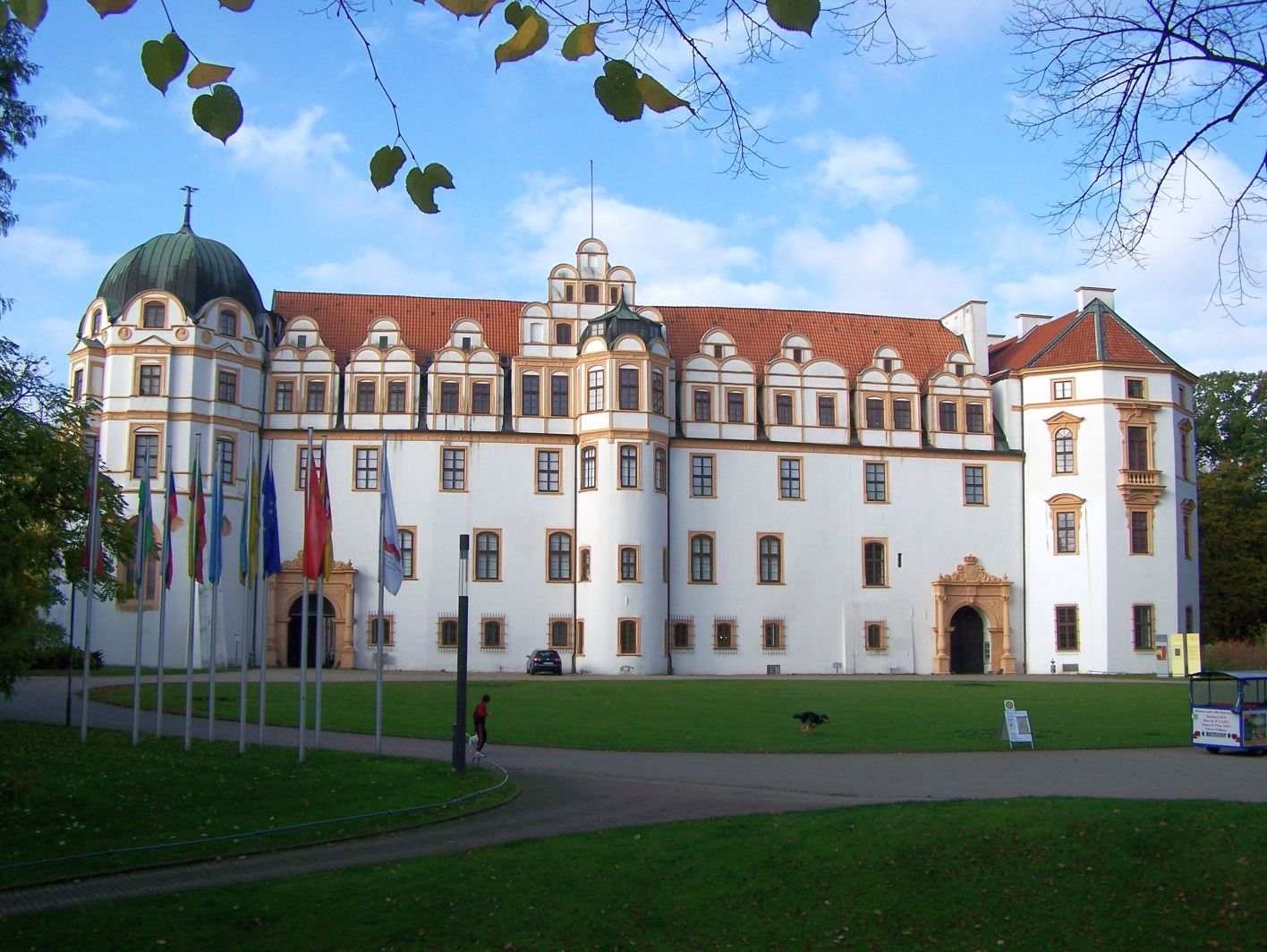
Celle Castle

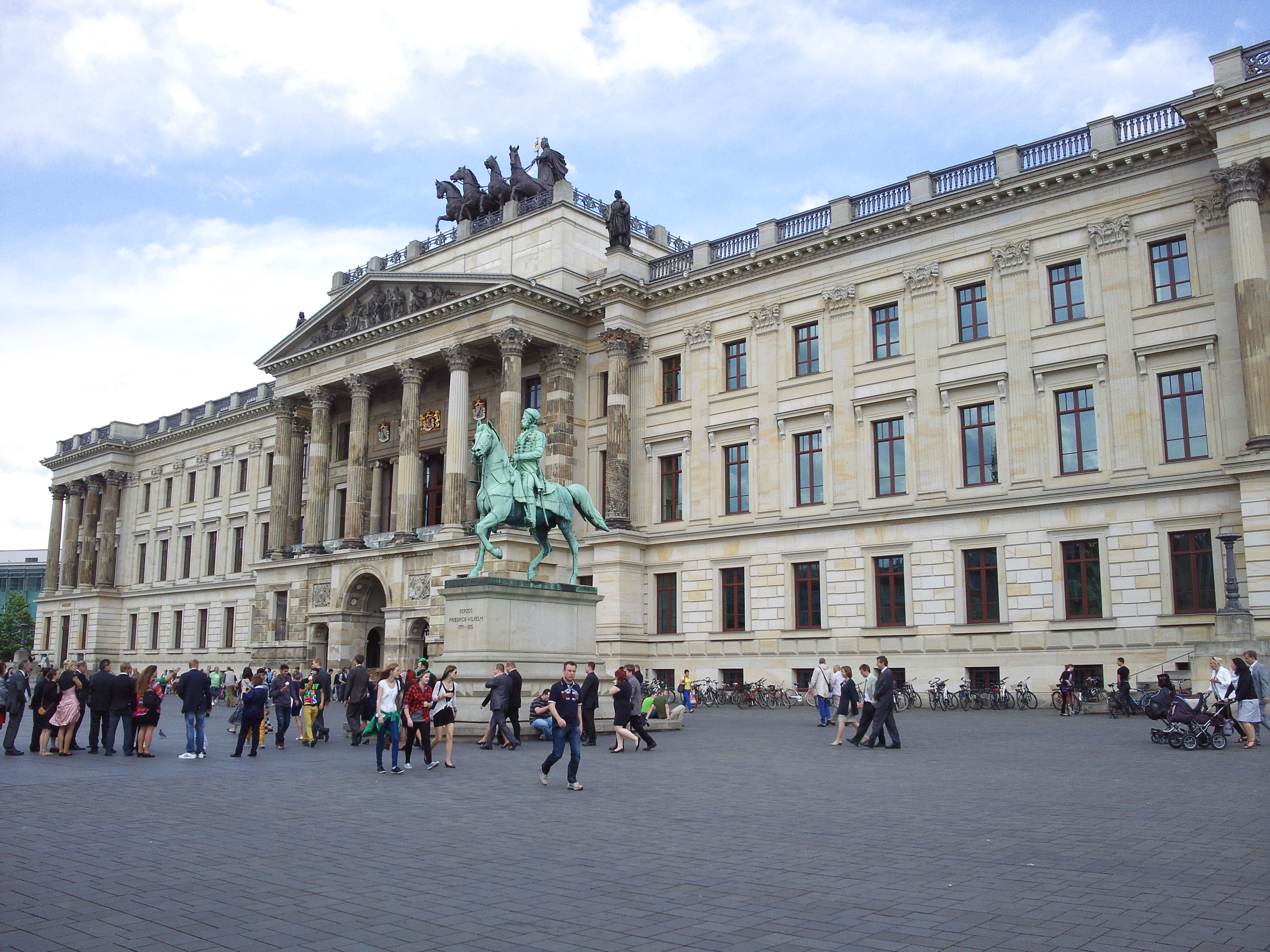
Brunswick Palace

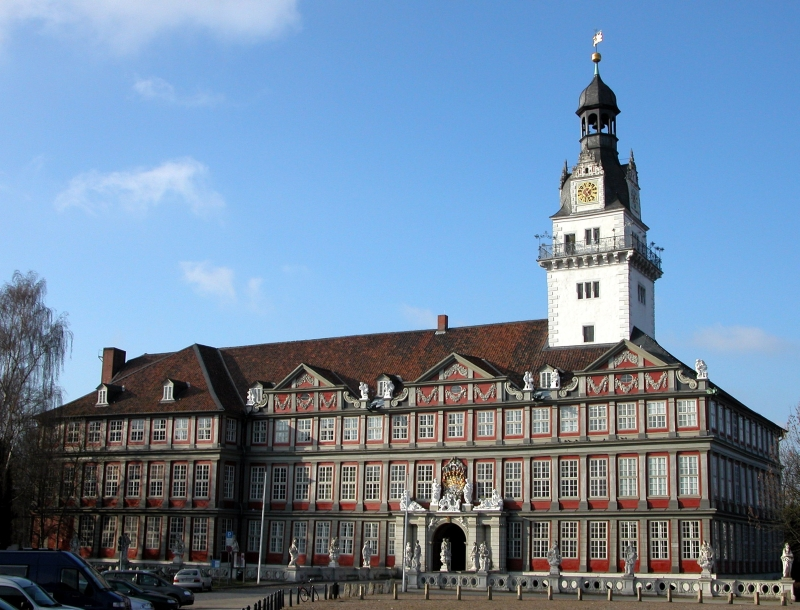
Wolfenbüttel Castle

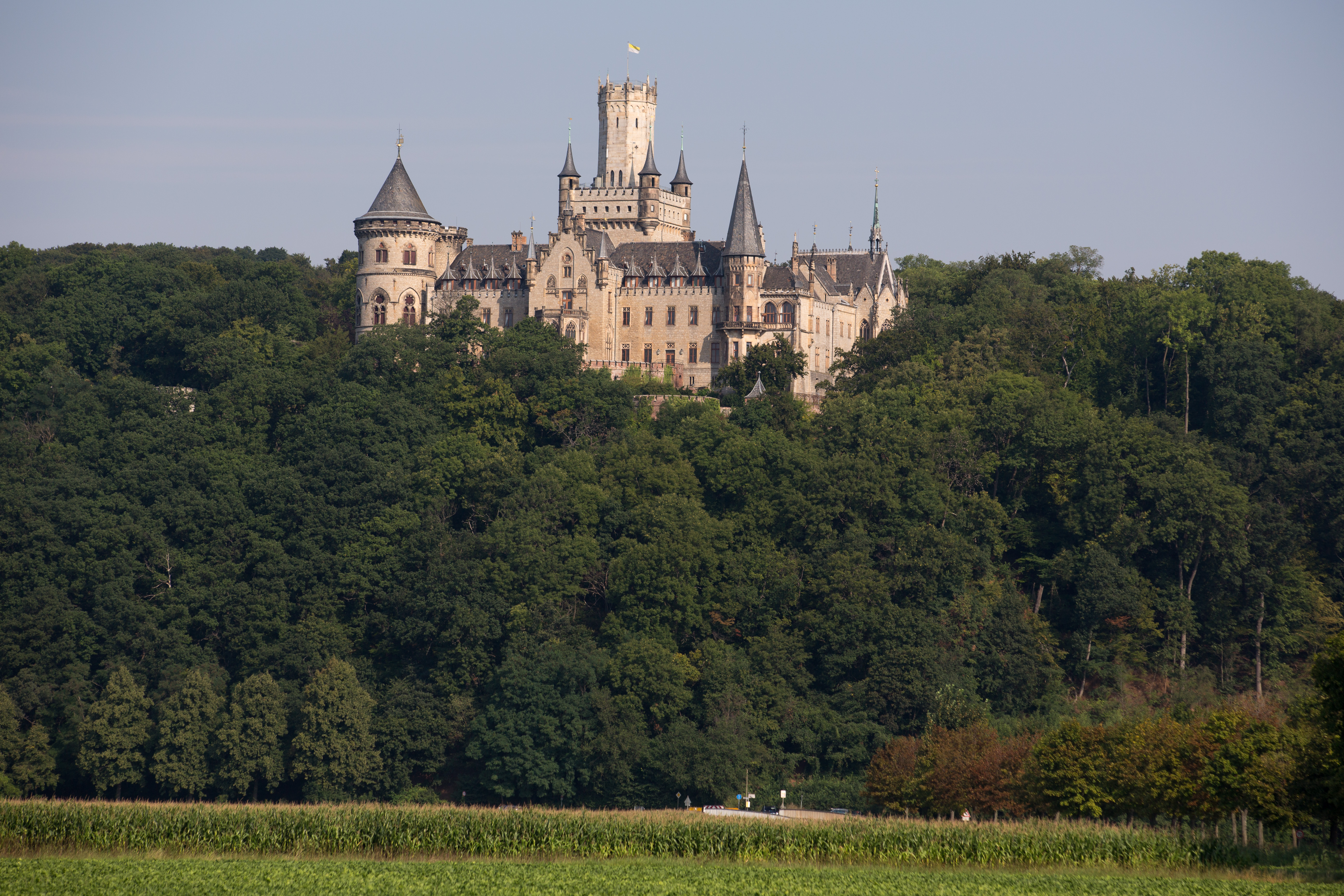
Marienburg Castle (Hanover)

== Rulers ==
=== House of Welf ===
Partitions under Welf rule

County of Auxerre (866–888); Raised to: Kingdom of Upper Burgundy (888–1032)	County of Altdorf (820–1191)
Annexed to the Holy Roman; Empire	County; Palatine of the Rhine (1195–1267)	Lordship of Lüneburg (1126–1235); Raised to: Duchy of Brunswick-Lüneburg (1235–1269)
Annexed to House of Wittelsbach	Principality of Brunswick (1269–1291)	Principality of Lüneburg (1st creation) (1269–1369)
Principality of Grubenhagen (1291–1596) (Note: Grubenhagen was firstly annexed to Wolfenbüttel, but in 1617 was a part of Lüneburg.)	Principality of Wolfenbüttel (1st creation) (1291–1292)
Principality of Göttingen (1291–1463)
Principality of Wolfenbüttel (2nd creation) (1344–1400)	Lüneburg under Ascanian rule (1373–1388)
Principality of Lüneburg (2nd creation) (1388–1705)
Principality of Calenberg (1st creation) (1432–1584)	Principality of Wolfenbüttel (3rd creation) (1409–1485)
Principality of Wolfenbüttel (4th creation) (1494–1807)
Principality of Calenberg (2nd creation) (1634–1692); Raised to Electorate of Hanover (1692–1866)
Annexed by France
Duchy of Brunswick (1813–1918)
Annexed by Prussia

Table of rulers

Ruler	Born	Reign	Ruling part	Consort	Death	Notes
Elder House of Welf
Welf (I)	c. 775; Son of Rothard of the Argengau	c. 800 – 3 October 825	County of Altdorf	Hedwig of Bavaria four children	3 October 825 aged 49–50	Eponymous founder of the family.
Conrad I the Elder	c. 800; Son of Welf I (a) and Hedwig of Bavaria	3 October 825 – 864	County of Altdorf	Adelaide of Tours three children	864 aged 63–64	
Welf I	c. 835; First son of Conrad I and Adelaide of Tours	864 – 876	County of Altdorf	Unknown at least one child	876 aged 40–41	Also Count at Linzgau, Alpgau and possibly Argengau.
Conrad II the Younger	c. 835; Second son of Conrad I and Adelaide of Tours	864 – 876	County of Auxerre	Waldrada of Worms one child	876 aged 40–41	
Eticho	c. 850; Son of Welf I (b)	876 – 911	County of Altdorf	Egila three children	c. 911	
Rudolf I	859; Son of Conrad II and Waldrada of Worms	876 – 25 October 911	County of Auxerre (until 888) Kingdom of Upper Burgundy (from 888)	Guilla of Provence c. 880 four children	25 October 911 aged 51–52	First King of Burgundy, from 888.
Henry I of the Golden Plough (Note: The numbering of the first Henrys and Welfs follows the one established in the Historia Welforum. See Historia Welforum Weingartensis, MGH SS XXI.)	c. 880; Son of Eticho and Egila	911 – 935	County of Altdorf	Atha of Hohenwart three children	c. 935 aged 54–55	
Rudolf II	c. 880; Son of Rudolf I and Guilla of Provence	25 October 911 – 11 July 937	Kingdom of Upper Burgundy	Bertha of Swabia; 922 two children	11 July 937 aged 56–57	Also King of Italy (922–926).
Rudolf I	c. 910; Son of Henry I and Atha of Hohenwart	935 – 950	County of Altdorf	Siburgis/Richlind at least one child	c. 950 aged 39–40	
Conrad III the Peaceful	925; Son of Rudolf II and Bertha of Swabia	11 July 937 – 19 October 993	Kingdom of Upper Burgundy	Adelaide of Bellay one child Matilda of France; 866 four children	19 October 993 aged 67–68	
Rudolf II	c. 940; Son of Rudolf I and Siburgis/Richlind	950 – 10 March 990	County of Altdorf	Ita of Öhningen three children	10 March c. 990 aged 49–50	
Henry II	c. 960; First son of Rudolf II and Ita of Öhningen	990 – 15 November 1000	County of Altdorf	Unmarried	15 November 1000	Left no descendants. He was succeeded by his brother.
Rudolf III the Pious	970; Son of Conrad III and Matilda of France	19 October 993 – 6 September 1032	Kingdom of Upper Burgundy	Agiltrude (d.1011) no children Ermengarde of Burgundy; 28 June 1011 no children	6 September 1032 aged 61–62	After his childless death, the Kingdom was inherited by his niece.
Welf II	c. 960; Second son of Rudolf II and Ita of Öhningen	15 November 1000 – 10 March 1030	County of Altdorf	Imiza of Luxembourg; 1017 two children	10 March 1030; Bodman-Ludwigshafen aged 69–70	
Welf III	1007; Son of Welf II and Imiza of Luxembourg	10 March 1030 – 13 November 1055	County of Altdorf	Unmarried	13 November 1055; Bodman-Ludwigshafen aged 47–48	Also Duke of Carinthia. By intercession of his aunt Richlind of Altdorf, he inherited the property of her late husband, Adalbert II, count of Ebersberg. Left no descendants, and his inheritance passed to his nephews, sons of his sister Kunigunde.
The Altdorf property, which had been donated by Welf III to the Weingarten Abbey, was transferred, by widow Imiza of Luxembourg, then its Abbess and also mother of the late count, to Welf IV, son of her daughter Kunigunda.
Gisela	11 November 990; Daughter of Herman II, Duke of Swabia and Gerberga of Burgundy	6 September 1032 – 15 February 1043	Kingdom of Upper Burgundy (Conradine dynasty)	Brun I, Count of Brunswick; 1002 three children Ernest I, Duke of Swabia; 1012 two children Conrad II, Holy Roman Emperor; 1016 three children	15 February 1043; Goslar aged 52	Gisela was heiress of her maternal uncle, which lead to the annexation of the kingdom to the Holy Roman Empire.
Upper Burgundy annexed to the Holy Roman Empire
Younger House of Welf
Welf IV	c. 1035; Solesino (?); Son of Albert Azzo II, Margrave of Milan and Kunigunde of Altdorf	13 November 1055 – 6 November 1101	County of Altdorf	Ethelinde of Northeim; 1062 no children Judith of Flanders; 1071 three children	6 November 1101; Paphos aged 65–66	Son of Kunigunde of Altdorf and Albert Azzo II, Margrave of Milan, inherited his maternal family's possessions. Also Duke of Bavaria (1070–1077 and 1096–1101).
Welf V the Fat	1072; First son of Welf IV and Judith of Flanders	6 November 1101 – 4 September 1120	County of Altdorf	Matilda of Tuscany; 1088/89 no children	24 September 1120 aged 47–48	Left no children, and the county went to his brother. Also Duke of Bavaria.
Henry III the Black	1075; Second son of Welf IV and Judith of Flanders	4 September 1120 – 13 December 1126	County of Altdorf	Wulfhilde of Saxony; 1095 eight children	13 December 1126; Ravensburg aged 50–51	Inherited by marriage possessions in the Luneburg, to the north.
Henry IV the Proud	1108; Second son of Henry (III) and Wulfhilde of Saxony	13 December 1126 – 20 October 1139	Lordship of Lüneburg	Gertrude of Süpplingenburg; 1202 one child	20 October 1139; Quedlinburg aged 30–31	Children of Henry the Black, Welf VI and Henry the Proud divided their inheritance: Welf VI kept the original possessions to the south, and Henry the northern ones, besides inheriting his father's title of Duke of Bavaria (1136–38), and conquering also the title of Duke of Saxony (1137–1139) inherited from their mother. Welf VI would also go on to become Margrave of Tuscany and Duke of Spoleto (1152–1160 and 1167–1173). In 1129, after Henry the Proud's defeat against Lothair III, Holy Roman Emperor, his sister Sophia was given a seat at Regensburg. From c. 1150 until his death in 1167, Welf VI's son, Welf VII, was associated to his father, but predeceased him. After Welf VI's death, Altdorf was annexed to the Holy Roman Empire.
Welf VI the Mild	1115; Third son of Henry (III) and Wulfhilde of Saxony	13 December 1126 – 15 December 1191	County of Altdorf	Uta of Schauenburg c. 1130 two children	15 December 1191; Memmingen aged 75–76	
Welf VII	1135; Son of Welf VI and Uta of Schauenburg	c. 1150 – 12 September 1167	County of Altdorf	Unmarried	12 September 1167; Siena aged 31–32	
Sophia	1105; Daughter of Henry (III) and Wulfhilde of Saxony	1129 – 10 July 1145	County of Altdorf (at Regensburg)	Berthold III, Duke of Zähringen c. 1120 no children Leopold, Margrave of Styria c. 1122 four children	10 July 1145 aged 39–40	
Regency of Gertrude of Süpplingenburg (1139–1142)						Inherited Brunswick from his mother after her death in 1143. Also Duke of Saxony (1142–1180) and Duke of Bavaria (1156–1180). When Frederick I, Holy Roman Emperor, became king of Germany, he restored Bavaria to the Welf line.
Henry V the Lion	1129; Ravensburg; Son of Henry (I) and Gertrude of Süpplingenburg	20 October 1139 – 6 August 1195	Lordship of Lüneburg	Clementia of Zähringen; 1147 three children Matilda of England; 1168 five children	6 August 1195; Braunschweig aged 65–66	Inherited Brunswick from his mother after her death in 1143. Also Duke of Saxony (1142–1180) and Duke of Bavaria (1156–1180). When Frederick I, Holy Roman Emperor, became king of Germany, he restored Bavaria to the Welf line.
Henry (V) the Elder (Note: Numbered V as Count Palatine of the Rhine)	1173; First son of Henry (II) and Matilda of England	6 August 1195 – 1212	County Palatine of the Rhine (also at Stade and Altencelle, in Lüneburg)	Agnes of Hohenstaufen; 1193 three children Agnes of Landsberg; 1209 no children	28 April 1227; Braunschweig aged 53–54	Inherited the land jointly until 1213, when after William's death, they resigned this possessions in favor that William's son, the inheritor of the Luneburg property. Henry was Count Palatine of the Rhine (1195–1213), and Otto was Holy Roman Emperor (1212–1218). Henry also inherited, after William's death, extensive properties near the Elbe and the Weser.
Otto	1175; Third son of Henry (II) and Matilda of England	6 August 1195 – 19 May 1218	Lordship of Lüneburg (at Haldensleben)	Beatrice of Swabia; 1212 no children Maria of Brabant; 19 May 1214; Maastricht no children	19 May 1218; Harzburg aged 42–43	Inherited the land jointly until 1213, when after William's death, they resigned this possessions in favor that William's son, the inheritor of the Luneburg property. Henry was Count Palatine of the Rhine (1195–1213), and Otto was Holy Roman Emperor (1212–1218). Henry also inherited, after William's death, extensive properties near the Elbe and the Weser.
William Longsword	11 April 1184; Winchester; Fourth son of Henry (II) and Matilda of England	6 August 1195 – 12 December 1213	Lordship of Lüneburg	Helena of Denmark; 1202; Hamburg one child	12 December 1213; Lüneburg aged 29	Inherited the land jointly until 1213, when after William's death, they resigned this possessions in favor that William's son, the inheritor of the Luneburg property. Henry was Count Palatine of the Rhine (1195–1213), and Otto was Holy Roman Emperor (1212–1218). Henry also inherited, after William's death, extensive properties near the Elbe and the Weser.
Haldensleben re-merged in Lüneburg
Henry (VI) the Younger (Note: Numbered VI as Count Palatine of the Rhine)	1196; Son of Henry (III) and Agnes of Hohenstaufen	1212 – 26 April 1214	County Palatine of the Rhine	Unmarried	26 April 1214 aged 17–18	After his death the Palatinate was inherited by his sister.
Regency of Otto IV, Holy Roman Emperor (1213–1218)						He was raised to Duke and recognised as such in 1235, by Frederick II, Holy Roman Emperor
Otto I the Child (Note: As the first Duke of Brunswick-Luneburg, the numbering restarts from here.)	1204; Son of William and Helena of Denmark	12 December 1213 – 9 June 1252	Duchy of Brunswick-Lüneburg	Matilda of Brandenburg; 1228 ten children	9 June 1252; Lüneburg aged 47–48	He was raised to Duke and recognised as such in 1235, by Frederick II, Holy Roman Emperor
Agnes	1201; Daughter of Henry (III) and Agnes of Hohenstaufen	26 April 1214 – 1267	County Palatine of the Rhine	Otto IV, Duke of Bavaria; 1222; Worms five children	1267 aged 65–66	Her marriage with Otto, Duke of Bavaria determined the annexation of the county to the patrimony of the House of Wittelsbach.
County Palatine of the Rhine was inherited by the House of Wittelsbach
Albert I the Tall	1236; First son of Otto I and Matilda of Brandenburg	9 June 1252 – 15 August 1279	Principality of Brunswick (until 1269 co-ruling in Brunswick-Lüneburg)	Elisabeth of Brabant; 1254 no children Alexia of Montferrat; 1263 seven children	15 August 1279; Braunschweig aged 42–43	Children of Otto I, they shared rule of the land until 1269. Albert became Prince of Brunswick and John a Prince of Luneburg.
John	1242; Second son of Otto I and Matilda of Brandenburg	9 June 1252 – 13 December 1277	Principality of Lüneburg (until 1269 co-ruling in Brunswick-Lüneburg)	Liutgard of Holstein-Itzehoe; 1265 five children	13 December 1277; Braunschweig aged 34–35	Children of Otto I, they shared rule of the land until 1269. Albert became Prince of Brunswick and John a Prince of Luneburg.
All Welf lines continued to bear the title "Duke of Brunswick-Lüneburg" between the division of 1269 and the end of the Holy Roman Empire in 1806. This was an additional title to the representation of their actual territorial lordship. However, as this is a list of rulers, the list goes beyond the use of the title, going through all generations until the end of the noble family representation in the land, in 1918.
Regency of Albert I, Duke of Brunswick-Lüneburg (1277–1279); Regency of Conrad of Brunswick-Lüneburg, Prince-Bishop of Verden (1277–1282)						His rule was marked by several feuds, financed by pledges (Verpfändungen), involving border and property disputes with his neighbours. Otto restricted the rights of the knights and safeguarded public order.
Otto II the Strict	1266; Son of John and Liutgard of Holstein-Itzehoe	13 December 1277 – 10 April 1330	Principality of Lüneburg	Matilda of Bavaria; 1288 five children	10 April 1330 aged 63–64	His rule was marked by several feuds, financed by pledges (Verpfändungen), involving border and property disputes with his neighbours. Otto restricted the rights of the knights and safeguarded public order.
Henry I the Admirable	August 1267; First son of Albert I and Alexia of Montferrat	15 August 1279 – 7 September 1322	Principality of Grubenhagen (until 1291 co-ruling at Brunswick)	Agnes of Meissen; 1282 sixteen children	7 September 1322; Einbeck aged 55	Children of Albert I, ruled jointly. In 1291 divided the land: Henry received Grubenhagen, William Wolfenbüttel and Albert Göttingen. William died without descendants, and Albert reunited his land with his brother's. Wolfenbüttel became part of Göttingen.
Albert II the Fat	1268; Second son of Albert I and Alexia of Montferrat	15 August 1279 – 22 September 1318	Principality of Göttingen (until 1291 co-ruling at Brunswick)	Rixa of Werle; 1284 ten children	22 September 1318 aged 49–50	Children of Albert I, ruled jointly. In 1291 divided the land: Henry received Grubenhagen, William Wolfenbüttel and Albert Göttingen. William died without descendants, and Albert reunited his land with his brother's. Wolfenbüttel became part of Göttingen.
William I	1270; Third son of Albert I and Alexia of Montferrat	15 August 1279 – 30 September 1292	Principality of Wolfenbüttel (until 1291 co-ruling at Brunswick)	Elisabeth of Hesse; 1290 no children	30 September 1292; Braunschweig aged 21–22	Children of Albert I, ruled jointly. In 1291 divided the land: Henry received Grubenhagen, William Wolfenbüttel and Albert Göttingen. William died without descendants, and Albert reunited his land with his brother's. Wolfenbüttel became part of Göttingen.
Wolfenbüttel briefly annexed to Göttingen
Otto (I) the Mild	24 June 1292; First son of Albert II and Rixa of Werle	22 September 1318 – 30 August 1344	Principality of Göttingen	Judith of Hesse; 1311 no children Agnes of Brandenburg-Salzwedel; 1319 no children	30 August 1344; Göttingen aged 52	By marriage inherited the Altmark region, which he sold c.1340. Left no descendants. His inheritance went to his brothers.
Henry II of Greece	c.1295 First son of Henry I and Agnes of Meissen	7 September 1322 – 1351	Principality of Grubenhagen	Jutta of Brandenburg-Stendal; 1318 four children Helvis of Ibelin; 1324 six children	c.1355 Grubenhagen aged 59–60	Sons of Henry I, ruled jointly.
John I	c.1295 Second son of Henry I and Agnes of Meissen	7 September 1322 – 1325	Principality of Grubenhagen	Unmarried	c.1370 Einbeck aged 59–60	Sons of Henry I, ruled jointly.
Ernest I	1297; Third son of Henry I and Agnes of Meissen	7 September 1322 – 9 March 1361	Principality of Grubenhagen	Adelheid of Everstein-Polle; June 1335 nine children	9 March 1361 aged 63–64	Sons of Henry I, ruled jointly.
William	1298; Fourth son of Henry I and Agnes of Meissen	7 September 1322 – 1360	Principality of Grubenhagen	Unmarried	1360 aged 61–62	Sons of Henry I, ruled jointly.
Otto III	1296; Second son of Otto II and Matilda of Bavaria	10 April 1330 – 19 August 1352	Principality of Lüneburg	Matilda of Mecklenburg; 1311 three children	19 August 1352 aged 55–56	Sons of Otto II, ruled jointly. After Otto's death in 1352, William ruled alone. His death without descendants precipitated the Lüneburg War of Succession in 1370.
William II the Elder	c. 1300; Fourth son of Otto II and Matilda of Bavaria	10 April 1330 – 23 November 1369	Principality of Lüneburg	Hedwig of Ravensberg; 7 April 1328 one child Maria; After 1387 one child Sophia of Anhalt-Bernburg; 12 March 1346 no children Agnes of Saxe-Lauenburg; 1363 no children	23 November 1369; Lüneburg aged 68–69	Sons of Otto II, ruled jointly. After Otto's death in 1352, William ruled alone. His death without descendants precipitated the Lüneburg War of Succession in 1370.
Magnus I the Pious	1304; Seventh son of Albert II and Rixa of Werle	30 August 1344 – 1369	Principality of Wolfenbüttel	Sophia of Brandenburg-Stendal; 1327 eight children	1369 aged 64–65	Younger brothers of Otto, divided the inheritance.
Ernest I	1305; Eighth son of Albert II and Rixa of Werle	30 August 1344 – 24 April 1367	Principality of Göttingen	Elisabeth of Hesse; 1337 three children	24 April 1367 aged 61–62	Younger brothers of Otto, divided the inheritance.
Albert I	c. 1339; First son of Ernest I and Adelaide of Eberstein-Polle	9 March 1361 – 1383	Principality of Grubenhagen	Agnes of Brunswick-Lüneburg; 1371 one child	1383 aged 43–44	Children of Ernest I, divided their inheritance. John II abdicated 1364 to join the clergy and Albert became sole ruler.
John II	c. 1339; Second son of Ernest I and Adelaide of Eberstein-Polle	9 March 1361 – 1364	Principality of Grubenhagen	Unmarried	18 January 1401 aged 61–62	Children of Ernest I, divided their inheritance. John II abdicated 1364 to join the clergy and Albert became sole ruler.
Frederick I	1350; Third son of Ernest I and Adelaide of Eberstein-Polle	9 March 1361 – 4 May 1421	Principality of Grubenhagen (at Osterode)	Adelaide of Anhalt-Bernburg one child	4 May 1421 aged 70–71	Children of Ernest I, divided their inheritance. John II abdicated 1364 to join the clergy and Albert became sole ruler.
Otto (II) the Evil	1330; Son of Ernest I and Elisabeth of Hesse	24 April 1367 – 13 November 1394	Principality of Göttingen	Mirolawa of Holstein-Plön (d.1376); 19 November 1357 no children Margarethe of Jülich-Berg; 1379 two children	13 November 1394; Hardegsen aged 63–64	
Magnus II of the Necklace (Torquatus)	1328; Son of Magnus I and Sophia of Brandenburg-Stendal	1369 – 25 July 1373	Principality of Wolfenbüttel (with Principality of Lüneburg)	Katherine of Anhalt-Bernburg; 1327 eight children	25 July 1373; Leveste aged 44–45	Inherited Wolfenbüttel from his father. However, the Lüneburg War of Succession allowed his succession also in this duchy. However, the War of Succession brought, after his death, the dukes of Saxe-Wittenberg to the government.
After the death of Magnus II with the Necklace, a treaty (the Reconciliation of Hanover) was agreed between the widow of Magnus II and her sons and the claimers, Albert of Saxe-Wittenberg and his uncle Duke Wenceslaus I of Saxe-Wittenberg: the estates of the Principality were to pay homage both to the Welfs and to the Ascanians, and the two noble houses would govern the state alternately. Initially, the land would be given to the two Ascanians from Wittenberg, and after their death it would go to the sons of the fallen Duke Magnus II. After their death, rule of the Principality was to revert to the Ascanians. In order to underpin the agreement, in 1374 Albert of Saxe-Lüneburg married Catharina, the widow of Magnus II. The treaty also envisaged the creation of a statutory body representing the estates, which was to supervise the treaty. However, 1373–1388 would be the only period in which a Brunswick-Luneburg land was not ruled by a Welf: Albert of Saxe-Wittenberg (1373–1385), son of Elisabeth, daughter of William II.; Wenceslaus I, Duke of Saxe-Wittenberg (1385–1388), uncle of the previous; In the wake of his death, Elector Wenceslas appointed Bernard, his brother-in-law, as co-regent involved him in the government. But his younger brother Henry did not agree with this ruling, and after vain attempts to reach an agreement, the fight flared up again in the spring of 1388. Elector Wenceslas had to assemble an army without the help of Bernard, supported by the town of Lüneburg. From Winsen an der Aller, he wanted to attack Celle, which was held by Henry and his mother. During the preparations Elector Wenceslas fell seriously ill and died shortly thereafter. According to legend, he was poisoned. Lüneburg continued the preparations, formed an alliance with the Bishop of Minden and Count of Schaumburg and set up his own army. On 28 May 1388, battle was joined at Winsen an der Aller; it ended in victory for Henry. According to the provisions of the Treaty of Hanover from the year 1373, after the death of Wensceslas, the Principality passed to the House of Welf. In 1389, an inheritance agreement between the Welfs and the Ascanians was concluded, the treaty of 1374 was abolished, and the Principality was secured for the Welfs.
Frederick I	1357; First son of Magnus II nad Catherine of Anhalt-Bernburg	25 July 1373 – 5 June 1400	Principality of Wolfenbüttel	Anna of Saxe-Wittenberg; 1386 two children	5 June 1400; Kleinenglis aged 42–43	Children of Magnus II. As the eldest, Frederick inherited Wolfenbuttel alone, while his younger brothers held Luneburg sinceits recovery in 1388. After Frederick I's childless death in 1400, the remaining brothers exchanged feuds until 1428.
Henry (I) the Mild	1355; Second son of Magnus II and Catherine of Anhalt-Bernburg	15 May 1388 – 14 October 1416	Principality of Lüneburg	Sophia of Pomerania; 11 November 1388 two children Margaret of Hesse; 30 January 1409; Kassel one child	14 October 1416 aged 60–61	Children of Magnus II. As the eldest, Frederick inherited Wolfenbuttel alone, while his younger brothers held Luneburg sinceits recovery in 1388. After Frederick I's childless death in 1400, the remaining brothers exchanged feuds until 1428.
Henry (I) the Mild	1355; Second son of Magnus II and Catherine of Anhalt-Bernburg	5 June 1400 – 1409	Principality of Wolfenbüttel	Sophia of Pomerania; 11 November 1388 two children Margaret of Hesse; 30 January 1409; Kassel one child	14 October 1416 aged 60–61	Children of Magnus II. As the eldest, Frederick inherited Wolfenbuttel alone, while his younger brothers held Luneburg sinceits recovery in 1388. After Frederick I's childless death in 1400, the remaining brothers exchanged feuds until 1428.
Bernard I	1358; Third son of Magnus II and Catherine of Anhalt-Bernburg	15 May 1388 – 1409 1428 – 11 June 1434	Principality of Lüneburg	Margaret of Saxe-Wittenberg; 1386 three children	11 June 1434; Celle aged 75–76	Children of Magnus II. As the eldest, Frederick inherited Wolfenbuttel alone, while his younger brothers held Luneburg sinceits recovery in 1388. After Frederick I's childless death in 1400, the remaining brothers exchanged feuds until 1428.
Bernard I	1358; Third son of Magnus II and Catherine of Anhalt-Bernburg	1409 – 1428	Principality of Wolfenbüttel	Margaret of Saxe-Wittenberg; 1386 three children	11 June 1434; Celle aged 75–76	Children of Magnus II. As the eldest, Frederick inherited Wolfenbuttel alone, while his younger brothers held Luneburg sinceits recovery in 1388. After Frederick I's childless death in 1400, the remaining brothers exchanged feuds until 1428.
Regency of Frederick I, Duke of Brunswick-Osterode (1383–1401)						
Eric I the Winner	c. 1380; Son of Albert I and Agnes of Brunswick-Lüneburg	1383 – 28 May 1427	Principality of Grubenhagen	Elisabeth of Brunswick-Göttingen six children	28 May 1427 aged 46–47	
Otto (III) the One-Eyed	1380; Son of Otto (II) and Margarethe of Jülich-Berg	13 November 1394 – 6 February 1463	Principality of Göttingen	Agnes of Hesse; 1408 one child	6 February 1463; Uslar aged 82–83	With no male heirs, after his death Göttingen is absorbed by Calenberg.
Göttingen annexed to Calenberg
William (III & I) the Victorious	1392; Son of Henry (I) and Sophia of Pomerania	14 October 1416 – 1428	Principality of Lüneburg	Cecilia of Brandenburg; 30 May/6 June 1423; Berlin two children Matilda of Holstein-Pinneberg; 1466 one child	25 July 1482 aged 89–90	Sons of Henry the Mild, ruled jointly. In 1428 they exchanged, with their uncle Bernard I, Lüneburg for Wolfenbüttel. In 1432 founded the Principality of Calenberg, a split-off from Lüneburg, and left the remaining Wolfenbüttel to his brother Henry IV. After the latter's death William took his lands. In 1463, attached the Principality of Göttingen to Calenberg. In 1473, William also annexed Wolfenbüttel.
William (III & I) the Victorious	1392; Son of Henry (I) and Sophia of Pomerania	1428 – 1432	Principality of Wolfenbüttel	Cecilia of Brandenburg; 30 May/6 June 1423; Berlin two children Matilda of Holstein-Pinneberg; 1466 one child	25 July 1482 aged 89–90	Sons of Henry the Mild, ruled jointly. In 1428 they exchanged, with their uncle Bernard I, Lüneburg for Wolfenbüttel. In 1432 founded the Principality of Calenberg, a split-off from Lüneburg, and left the remaining Wolfenbüttel to his brother Henry IV. After the latter's death William took his lands. In 1463, attached the Principality of Göttingen to Calenberg. In 1473, William also annexed Wolfenbüttel.
William (III & I) the Victorious	1392; Son of Henry (I) and Sophia of Pomerania	1432 – 25 July 1482	Principality of Calenberg (with Principalities of Göttingen from 1463 and Wolfenbüttel from 1473)	Cecilia of Brandenburg; 30 May/6 June 1423; Berlin two children Matilda of Holstein-Pinneberg; 1466 one child	25 July 1482 aged 89–90	Sons of Henry the Mild, ruled jointly. In 1428 they exchanged, with their uncle Bernard I, Lüneburg for Wolfenbüttel. In 1432 founded the Principality of Calenberg, a split-off from Lüneburg, and left the remaining Wolfenbüttel to his brother Henry IV. After the latter's death William took his lands. In 1463, attached the Principality of Göttingen to Calenberg. In 1473, William also annexed Wolfenbüttel.
Henry (II) the Peaceful	1411; Son of Henry (I) and Margaret of Hesse	14 October 1416 – 1428	Principality of Lüneburg	Helena of Clèves; 1436 one child	7 December 1473 aged 61–62	Sons of Henry the Mild, ruled jointly. In 1428 they exchanged, with their uncle Bernard I, Lüneburg for Wolfenbüttel. In 1432 founded the Principality of Calenberg, a split-off from Lüneburg, and left the remaining Wolfenbüttel to his brother Henry IV. After the latter's death William took his lands. In 1463, attached the Principality of Göttingen to Calenberg. In 1473, William also annexed Wolfenbüttel.
Henry (II) the Peaceful	1411; Son of Henry (I) and Margaret of Hesse	1428 – 7 December 1473	Principality of Wolfenbüttel	Helena of Clèves; 1436 one child	7 December 1473 aged 61–62	Sons of Henry the Mild, ruled jointly. In 1428 they exchanged, with their uncle Bernard I, Lüneburg for Wolfenbüttel. In 1432 founded the Principality of Calenberg, a split-off from Lüneburg, and left the remaining Wolfenbüttel to his brother Henry IV. After the latter's death William took his lands. In 1463, attached the Principality of Göttingen to Calenberg. In 1473, William also annexed Wolfenbüttel.
Wolfenbüttel briefly annexed to Calenberg
Otto II	1396; Son of Frederick I and Adelaide of Anhalt-Bernburg	4 May 1421 – 1452	Principality of Grubenhagen (at Osterode)	Schonetta of Nassau-Weilburg (d.1436); 1414 one child	1452	After his death, Osterode returned to Grubenhagen.
Osterode re-merged in Grubenhagen
Regency of Otto II, Duke of Brunswick-Osterode (1427–1440)						Sons of Eric I, were under regency until 1440, when they divided Grubenhagen. Henry kept Heldenburg Castle, and Albert Herzberg Castle, but kept the joint rule at Osterode am Harz and Einbeck. Ernest didn't participate in the division, and abdicated in 1464, to become a canon in Halberstadt.
Henry III	1416; Grubenhagen; First son of Eric I and Elisabeth of Brunswick-Göttingen	28 May 1427 – 20 December 1464	Principality of Grubenhagen (at Heldenburg from 1440)	Margaret of Żagań before 27 June 1457 two children	20 December 1464 aged 47–48	Sons of Eric I, were under regency until 1440, when they divided Grubenhagen. Henry kept Heldenburg Castle, and Albert Herzberg Castle, but kept the joint rule at Osterode am Harz and Einbeck. Ernest didn't participate in the division, and abdicated in 1464, to become a canon in Halberstadt.
Ernest II	1418; Second son of Eric I and Elisabeth of Brunswick-Göttingen	28 May 1427 – 1466	Principality of Grubenhagen	Unmarried	1466 aged 47–48	Sons of Eric I, were under regency until 1440, when they divided Grubenhagen. Henry kept Heldenburg Castle, and Albert Herzberg Castle, but kept the joint rule at Osterode am Harz and Einbeck. Ernest didn't participate in the division, and abdicated in 1464, to become a canon in Halberstadt.
Albert II	1 November 1419; Third son of Eric I and Elisabeth of Brunswick-Göttingen	28 May 1427 – 15 August 1485	Principality of Grubenhagen (at Herzberg)	Elisabeth of Waldeck; 15 October 1471 two children	15 August 1485 aged 65	Sons of Eric I, were under regency until 1440, when they divided Grubenhagen. Henry kept Heldenburg Castle, and Albert Herzberg Castle, but kept the joint rule at Osterode am Harz and Einbeck. Ernest didn't participate in the division, and abdicated in 1464, to become a canon in Halberstadt.
Otto IV the Lame	c.1400 First son of Bernard I and Margaret of Saxe-Wittenberg	11 June 1434 – 1 June 1446	Principality of Lüneburg	Elisabeth of Eberstein; 1425 one child	1 June 1446 aged 45–46	Ruled jointly. Their rule was marked by major building work to Celle Castle and also by numerous reforms which improved the legal situation of farmers vis-a-vis their local lords. Frederick abdicated to his sons and went to a monastery, but after the death of his son Otto, he left the monastery and resumed his rule.
Frederick II the Pious	1418; Second son of Bernard I and Margaret of Saxe-Wittenberg	11 June 1434 – 1457 9 January 1471 – 19 March 1478	Principality of Lüneburg	Magdalene of Brandenburg; 3 July 1429; Tangermünde three children	19 March 1478; Celle aged 59–60	Ruled jointly. Their rule was marked by major building work to Celle Castle and also by numerous reforms which improved the legal situation of farmers vis-a-vis their local lords. Frederick abdicated to his sons and went to a monastery, but after the death of his son Otto, he left the monastery and resumed his rule.
Bernard II	1437; First son of Frederick II and Magdalene of Brandenburg	1457 – 9 February 1464	Principality of Lüneburg	Matilda of Holstein-Pinneberg; 1463 no children	9 February 1464; Celle aged 26–27	Children of Frederick II, ruled jointly. Bernard was also Prince-Bishop of Hildesheim.
Otto V the Magnanimous	1439; First son of Frederick II and Magdalene of Brandenburg	1457 – 9 January 1471	Principality of Lüneburg	Anne of Nassau-Siegen; 25 September 1467; Celle two children	9 January 1471; Celle aged 31–32	Children of Frederick II, ruled jointly. Bernard was also Prince-Bishop of Hildesheim.
Regency of Albert II, Duke of Brunswick-Grubenhagen (1464–1479)						With his uncle Albert, officialized the division of Grubenhagen. However, his death without descendants allowed his cousins (sons of Albert) to reunite Grubenhagen.
Henry IV	1460; Son of Henry III and Margaret of Żagań	20 December 1464 – 6 December 1526	Principality of Grubenhagen (at Heldenburg)	Elisabeth of Saxe-Lauenburg; 26 August 1494; Einbeck no children	6 December 1526; Einbeck aged 65–66	With his uncle Albert, officialized the division of Grubenhagen. However, his death without descendants allowed his cousins (sons of Albert) to reunite Grubenhagen.
Regency of Anne of Nassau-Siegen (1478–1486)						Son of Otto V. As he opposed to the newly elected Emperor Charles V, the latter deposed him from the duchy and gave it to his sons.
Henry (III) the Middle	15 September 1468; Lüneburg; Son of Otto V and Anne of Nassau-Siegen	19 March 1478 – 1520	Principality of Lüneburg	Margaret of Saxony; 27 February 1487; Celle seven children Anna von Campe c. 1528? (morganatic) no children	19 February 1532; Wienhausen aged 63	Son of Otto V. As he opposed to the newly elected Emperor Charles V, the latter deposed him from the duchy and gave it to his sons.
Frederick III the Turbulent	1424; First son of William (III & I) and Cecilia of Brandenburg	25 July 1482 – 1485	Principality of Calenberg (at Calenberg proper)	Anna of Brunswick-Grubenhagen-Einbeck; After 1460 no children Margaret of Rietberg; 10 May 1483 no children	5 March 1495; Hann. Münden aged 70–71	Children of William III/I, divided their inheritance. Wiliam IV/II imprisoned by his brother Frederick, and took his place in Calenberg, reuniting the inheritance once again. William eventually abdicated of all his property to his sons.
William (IV & II) the Younger	1425; Second son of William (III & I) and Cecilia of Brandenburg	25 July 1482 – 1495	Principality of Calenberg (at Wolfenbüttel until 1485; at Principality of Göttingen only since 1491)	Elizabeth of Stolberg-Wernigerode; 1444 three children	7 July 1503; Hardegsen aged 77–78	Children of William III/I, divided their inheritance. Wiliam IV/II imprisoned by his brother Frederick, and took his place in Calenberg, reuniting the inheritance once again. William eventually abdicated of all his property to his sons.
Regency of Henry IV, Duke of Brunswick-Grubenhagen and Elisabeth of Waldeck (1485-1490)						In 1526 reunited Grubenhagen under his hands.
Philip I	1476; Son of Albert II and Elisabeth of Waldeck	15 August 1485 – 4 September 1551	Grubenhagen (at Herzberg; from 1526 in all Grubenhagen)	Unknown before 1509 one child Catherine of Outer Mansfeld c. 1510? nine children	4 September 1551; Herzberg am Harz aged 74–75	In 1526 reunited Grubenhagen under his hands.
Henry (IV) the Elder	14 June 1463; First son of William (IV & II) and Elisabeth of Stolberg-Wernigerode	1495 – 23 June 1514	Principality of Wolfenbüttel	Catherine of Pomerania-Wolgast; 1486 nine children	23 June 1514; Leer aged 51	Children of William IV/II, initially ruled jointly, but in 1494, they officially divided their inheritance.
Eric I the Elder	16 February 1470; Neustadt am Rübenberge; Second son of William (IV & II) and Elisabeth of Stolberg-Wernigerode	1495 – 30 July 1540	Principality of Calenberg	Katharina of Saxony; 1496/97 no children Elisabeth of Brandenburg; 7 July 1525; Stettin four children	30 July 1540; Haguenau aged 70	Children of William IV/II, initially ruled jointly, but in 1494, they officially divided their inheritance.
Henry (V) the Younger	10 November 1489; Wolfenbüttel; Son of Henry (IV) and Catherine of Pomerania-Wolgast	23 June 1514 – 11 June 1568	Principality of Wolfenbüttel	Maria of Württemberg; 1515 eight children Sophia of Poland; 22/25 February 1556 no children	11 June 1568; Wolfenbüttel aged 78	He was the last Catholic of his family. Under him the medieval fortress (Burg) was rebuilt into a castle (Schloss); he was a passionate opponent of the Lutherans, and driving force behind the Catholic alliance established against the Schmalkaldic League; the disinheritance of a third son could not be carried out.
Otto (VI & I)	24 August 1495; Celle; First son of Henry (III) and Margaret of Saxony	1520 – 11 August 1549	Principality of Lüneburg (at Harburg from 1527)	Meta von Campe; 1527 (morganatic)no children	11 August 1549; Harburg aged 53	Sons of Henry VII, ruled jointly. Otto abdicated in 1527 and founded his own estate, the Lordship of Harburg, which passed to his own descendants. Ernest was a champion of the Protestant cause during the early years of the Protestant Reformation. Francis started his co-rulership in 1536, and abdicated three years later to rule in his own estate, the Principality of Gifhorn, which was reannexed to Lüneburg after his death as he left no descendants.
Ernest I the Confessor	27 June 1497; Uelzen; Second son of Henry (III) and Margaret of Saxony	1520 – 11 January 1546	Principality of Lüneburg	Sophia of Mecklenburg-Schwerin; 2 June 1528; Schwerin seven children	11 January 1546; Celle aged 48	Sons of Henry VII, ruled jointly. Otto abdicated in 1527 and founded his own estate, the Lordship of Harburg, which passed to his own descendants. Ernest was a champion of the Protestant cause during the early years of the Protestant Reformation. Francis started his co-rulership in 1536, and abdicated three years later to rule in his own estate, the Principality of Gifhorn, which was reannexed to Lüneburg after his death as he left no descendants.
Francis	23 November 1508; Uelzen; Third son of Henry (III) and Margaret of Saxony	1520 – 23 November 1549	Principality of Lüneburg (at Duchy of Gifhorn from 1539)	Clara of Saxe-Lauenburg; 29 September 1547; Amt Neuhaus seven children	23 November 1549; Gifhorn aged 41	Sons of Henry VII, ruled jointly. Otto abdicated in 1527 and founded his own estate, the Lordship of Harburg, which passed to his own descendants. Ernest was a champion of the Protestant cause during the early years of the Protestant Reformation. Francis started his co-rulership in 1536, and abdicated three years later to rule in his own estate, the Principality of Gifhorn, which was reannexed to Lüneburg after his death as he left no descendants.
Gifhorn re-merged in Lüneburg
Regencies of Elisabeth of Brandenburg and Philip I, Landgrave of Hesse (1540–1545)						During his regency, his mother implemented the Reformation in Calenberg. She also wrote a "government manual" for Eric, with important advice that should serve him as a guide. Left no descendants, and Calenberg was annexed to Wolfenbüttel.
Eric II the Younger	10 August 1528; Dassel; Son of Eric I and Elisabeth of Brandenburg	30 July 1540 – 17 November 1584	Principality of Calenberg	Sidonie of Saxony; 17 May 1545; Hann. Münden no children Dorothea of Lorraine; 26 November 1575; Nancy no children	17 November 1584; Pavia aged 56	During his regency, his mother implemented the Reformation in Calenberg. She also wrote a "government manual" for Eric, with important advice that should serve him as a guide. Left no descendants, and Calenberg was annexed to Wolfenbüttel.
Calenberg annexed to Wolfenbüttel
Council of Regency (1546–1555)						Left no descendants. The land passed to his brothers.
Francis Otto	20 June 1530; Celle; First son of Ernest I and Sophia of Mecklenburg-Schwerin	11 January 1546 – 29 April 1559	Principality of Lüneburg	Elisabeth Magdalena of Brandenburg; 5 February 1559 no children	29 April 1559; Celle aged 28	Left no descendants. The land passed to his brothers.
Otto II the Famous	25 September 1528; Celle; Son of Otto (VI & I) and Meta von Campe	11 August 1549 – 26 October 1603	Principality of Lüneburg (at Harburg)	Margaret of Schwarzburg-Leutenberg; 8 September 1551 four children Hedwig of East Frisia; 8 October 1562 twelve children	26 October 1603; Harburg aged 75	
Ernest III	17 December 1518; Osterode am Harz; First son of Philip I and Catherine of Outer Mansfeld	4 September 1551 – 2 April 1567	Grubenhagen	Margaret of Pomerania-Wolgast; 9 October 1547; Wolgast one child	2 April 1567; Herzberg am Harz aged 48	Left no male descendants. The land passed to his brother Wolfgang.
Henry (VI)	4 June 1533; Lüchow-Dannenberg; Third son of Ernest I and Sophia of Mecklenburg-Schwerin	29 April 1559 – 19 January 1598	Principality of Lüneburg (from 1569 in Dannenberg)	Ursula of Saxe-Lauenburg; 1569 seven children	19 January 1598; Dannenberg aged 64	Brothers of Francis Otto, initially ruled jointly. In 1569, Henry founded the duchy of Dannenberg, which left to his own descendants. William ruled alone from 1569.
William V the Young	4 July 1535; Fourth son of Ernest I and Sophia of Mecklenburg-Schwerin	29 April 1559 – 20 August 1592	Principality of Lüneburg	Dorothea of Denmark; 12 October 1561 fifteen children	20 August 1592 aged 57	Brothers of Francis Otto, initially ruled jointly. In 1569, Henry founded the duchy of Dannenberg, which left to his own descendants. William ruled alone from 1569.
Wolfgang	6 April 1531; Herzberg am Harz; Fifth son of Philip I and Catherine of Outer Mansfeld	2 April 1567 – 14 May 1595	Principality of Grubenhagen	Dorothea of Saxe-Lauenburg; 10 December 1570; Osterode am Harz no children	14 May 1595; Herzberg am Harz aged 64	Like most of his predecessors, he had financial problems, so he was often forced to sell or pledge major parts of his possession and he had to demand high taxes. As he left no male descendants, the land passed to his brother Philip.
Julius	29 June 1528; Wolfenbüttel; Son of Henry (V) and Maria of Württemberg	11 June 1568 – 3 May 1589	Principality of Wolfenbüttel	Hedwig of Brandenburg; 25 February 1560; Cölln eleven children	3 May 1589; Wolfenbüttel aged	In 1584 Julius absorbed the Principality of Calenberg. By embracing the Protestant Reformation, establishing the University of Helmstedt, and introducing a series of administrative reforms, Julius was one of the most important Brunswick dukes in the early modern era.
Ernest II	31 December 1564; CelleFirst son of William V and Dorothea of Denmark	20 August 1592 – 2 March 1611	Principality of Lüneburg	Unmarried	2 March 1611; Celle aged 46	Left no descendants. The land passed to his brother, Christian.
Henry Julius	15 October 1564; Hessen; Son of Julius and Hedwig of Brandenburg	3 May 1589 – 30 July 1613	Principality of Wolfenbüttel	Dorothea of Saxony; 26 September 1585; Wolfenbüttel one child Elizabeth of Denmark; 19 April 1590; Cölln ten children	30 July 1613; Prague aged 48	In 1596 occupied Grubenhagen.
Philip II	2 May 1533; Sixth son of Philip I and Catherine of Outer Mansfeld	14 May 1595 – 4 April 1596	Principality of Grubenhagen	Clara of Brunswick-Wolfenbüttel; 1 July 1560; Wolfenbüttel no children	4 April 1596 aged 62	As he left no male descendants, the land had no heir and was occupied by the Principality of Wolfenbüttel.
Grubenhagen annexed to Wolfenbüttel, and then definitely to Lüneburg
Julius Ernest	11 March 1571; Lüchow-Dannenberg; Son of Henry (VI) and Ursula of Saxe-Lauenburg	19 January 1598 – 26 October 1636	Principality of Lüneburg (at Dannenberg)	Maria of East Frisia; 1 September 1614 two children Sybille of Brunswick-Lüneburg; 1616 two children	26 October 1636 aged 65	Left no descendants. The short-lived Dannenberg principality reverted to Lüneburg.
Dannenberg annexed to Lüneburg
William Augustus	15 March 1564; Harburg; First son of Otto II and Hedwig of East Frisia	26 October 1603 – 30 March 1642	Principality of Lüneburg (in Harburg)	Unmarried	30 March 1642; Harburg aged 78	Sons of Otto II, ruled together in Harburg. After William Augustus' death, the lordship reunited with Lüneburg.
Christopher	21 August 1570; Harburg; Fourth son of Otto II and Hedwig of East Frisia	26 October 1603 – 7 July 1606	Principality of Lüneburg (in Harburg)	Elisabeth of Brunswick-Wolfenbüttel; 28 October 1604; Harburg no children	7 July 1606; Harburg aged 35	Sons of Otto II, ruled together in Harburg. After William Augustus' death, the lordship reunited with Lüneburg.
Otto III	20 March 1572; Harburg; Fifth son of Otto II and Hedwig of East Frisia	26 October 1603 – 4 August 1641	Principality of Lüneburg (in Harburg)	Hedwig of Brunswick-Wolfenbüttel; 14 April 1621; Wolfenbüttel no children	4 August 1641; Harburg aged 69	Sons of Otto II, ruled together in Harburg. After William Augustus' death, the lordship reunited with Lüneburg.
Harburg re-merged in Lüneburg
Christian the Elder	9 November 1566; Celle; Second son of William V and Dorothea of Denmark	2 March 1611 – 8 November 1633	Principality of Lüneburg (with Grubenhagen from 1617)	Unmarried	8 November 1633; Celle aged 66	Absorbed Grubenhagen from Wolfenbüttel. As he left no descendants, the land passed to his brother, Augustus. Grubenhagen is definitively annexed to Lüneburg.
Regency of Elizabeth of Denmark (1616–1622)						Children of Henry Julius. Frederick Ulirch inheriteed the major duchy, and Sophie Hedwig a seat at Spiegelberg. Because of his alcoholism, Frederick Ulrich was deposed by his own mother, with the help of her brother, Christian IV of Denmark. She took the regency in his name. During her regency, Elizabeth lost in 1617 the Principality of Grubenhagen and left the government business for Anton von Streithorst, who nearly ruined the state by minting coins from cheap metals and thus causing inflation. Because of the bad situation of the state, the king of Denmark had Frederick take control of the government again. Frederick didn't leave descendants, and his lands passed to collateral lines of the Lüneburg Welfs.
Frederick Ulrich the Lasting (Note: Nickname given to him by the Fruitbearing Society.)	5 April 1591; Wolfenbüttel; Son of Henry Julius and Elizabeth of Denmark	1613 – 11 August 1634	Principality of Wolfenbüttel	Anna Sophia of Brandenburg; 4 September 1614; Wolfenbüttel no children	11 August 1634; Braunschweig aged 43	
Sophia Hedwig	13 June 1592; Wolfenbüttel; Daughter of Henry Julius and Elizabeth of Denmark	1613 – 13 January 1642	Principality of Wolfenbüttel (at Spiegelberg)	Ernest Casimir I, Count of Nassau-Dietz; 8 June 1607; Dillenburg two children	13 January 1642; Arnhem aged 49	
Augustus the Elder	18 November 1568; Celle; Third son of William V and Dorothea of Denmark	8 November 1633 – 1 October 1636	Principality of Lüneburg	Unmarried	1 October 1636; Celle aged 67	No legitimate issue. The land passed to his brother, Frederick IV.
Augustus the Younger (Note: Known in the Fruitbearing Society as the Liberator)	10 April 1579; Dannenberg	11 August 1634 – 17 September 1666	Principality of Wolfenbüttel	Clara Maria of Pomerania-Barth; 13 December 1607; Strelitz two children Dorothea of Anhalt-Zerbst; 26 October 1623; Zerbst five children Elisabeth Sophie of Mecklenburg; 1635 two children	17 September 1666; Wolfenbüttel aged 87	Younger son of Henry (VI). Inherited Wolfenbüttel from his cousin Frederick Ulrich, who had left no descendants. In 1643 he moved into the Residence at Wolfenbüttel, was the founder of a barock theatre and the Bibliotheca Augusta.
George the Catcher	17 February 1582; Celle; Sixth son of William V and Dorothea of Denmark	11 August 1634 – 2 April 1641	Principality of Calenberg	Anne Eleonore of Hesse-Darmstadt; 14 December 1617; Darmstadt eight children	2 April 1641; Hildesheim aged 59	Inherited Calenberg from his cousin Frederick Ulrich, who had left no descendants. Abdicated to his son in 1641.
Frederick IV	28 August 1574; Celle; Fourth son of William V and Dorothea of Denmark	1 October 1636 – 10 December 1648	Principality of Lüneburg	Unmarried	10 December 1648; Celle aged 74	As he left no descendants, the land passed to a nephew, Christian Louis, son of Frederick's brother George.
Christian Louis the Pure-Hearted	25 February 1622; Herzberg Castle; First son of George and Anne Eleonore of Hesse-Darmstadt	1641 – 10 December 1648	Principality of Calenberg	Sophia Dorothea of Schleswig-Holstein-Sonderburg-Glücksburg; 9 October 1653 no children	15 March 1665; Celle aged 43	In 1648 inherited the Principality of Lüneburg from his uncle Frederick IV, he gave Calenberg to his younger brother George William, and instead ruled the larger territory of Lüneburg.
Christian Louis the Pure-Hearted	25 February 1622; Herzberg Castle; First son of George and Anne Eleonore of Hesse-Darmstadt	10 December 1648 – 15 March 1665	Principality of Lüneburg	Sophia Dorothea of Schleswig-Holstein-Sonderburg-Glücksburg; 9 October 1653 no children	15 March 1665; Celle aged 43	In 1648 inherited the Principality of Lüneburg from his uncle Frederick IV, he gave Calenberg to his younger brother George William, and instead ruled the larger territory of Lüneburg.
George William	26 January 1624; Herzberg Castle; Second son of George and Anne Eleonore of Hesse-Darmstadt	10 December 1648 – 15 March 1665	Principality of Calenberg	Éléonore Desmier d'Olbreuse; 1676 one child	28 August 1705; Wienhausen aged 81	When his brother, Christian Louis died childless in 1665, George William inherited Luneburg. He then gave Calenberg to his next brother, John Frederick. At his death without male descendants, the land passed to his son-in-law, the Elector of Hanover. Lüneburg is annexed to Hanover.
George William	26 January 1624; Herzberg Castle; Second son of George and Anne Eleonore of Hesse-Darmstadt	15 March 1665 – 28 August 1705	Principality of Lüneburg	Éléonore Desmier d'Olbreuse; 1676 one child	28 August 1705; Wienhausen aged 81	When his brother, Christian Louis died childless in 1665, George William inherited Luneburg. He then gave Calenberg to his next brother, John Frederick. At his death without male descendants, the land passed to his son-in-law, the Elector of Hanover. Lüneburg is annexed to Hanover.
Lüneburg definitely annexed to Hanôver
Rudolf Augustus	16 May 1627; Hitzacker; Second son of Augustus and Dorothea of Anhalt-Zerbst	17 September 1666 – 26 January 1704	Principality of Wolfenbüttel	Christiane Elizabeth of Barby-Mühlingen; 1650 three children Rosine Elisabeth Menthe; 1681 (morganatic) no children	26 January 1704; Kissenbrück aged 76	Sons of Augustus the Younger, the eldest two ruled jointly from 1685 to 1702. The youngest, Ferdinand Albert, ruled from the town of Bevern. According to reports dating to 1677, Rudolf Augustus slashed a way through the Lechlum Forest, the Alten Weg ("Old Way"), later the "Barock Road" between the Lustschloss of Antoinettenruh via the little barock castle [later the Sternhaus] to the Großes Weghaus at Stöckheim; in 1671 captured the town and fortress of Brunswick. After the death of Rudolf Augustus, Anthony Ulrich returned to the throne and ruled alone. A politician, art lover and poet, he founded a museum named after him in Brunswick; he had also Salzdahlum Castle built.
Anthony Ulrich the Victorious	4 October 1633; Third son of Augustus and Dorothea of Anhalt-Zerbst	18 April 1685 – 27 March 1714	Principality of Wolfenbüttel	Elizabeth Juliana of Schleswig-Holstein-Sønderburg-Nordborg; 17 August 1656 thirteen children	27 March 1714; Salzdahlum aged 80	
Ferdinand Albert I the Wonderful	22 May 1636; Braunschweig; Son of Augustus and Elisabeth Sophie of Mecklenburg	17 September 1666 – 23 April 1687	Principality of Wolfenbüttel (at Bevern)	Christine of Hesse-Eschwege; 25 November 1667; Eschwege six children	23 April 1687; Bevern aged 50	
John Frederick	25 April 1625; Herzberg Castle; Third son of George and Anne Eleonore of Hesse-Darmstadt	1665 – 18 December 1679	Principality of Calenberg	Benedicta Henrietta of the Palatinate; 30 November 1668; Hanover three children	18 December 1679; Augsburg aged 54	As he left no male heirs, the land passed to his younger brother, Ernest Augustus.
Ernest Augustus I	20 November 1629; Herzberg Castle; Fourth son of George and Anne Eleonore of Hesse-Darmstadt	18 December 1679 – 23 January 1698	Principality of Calenberg (until 1692) Electorate of Hanover (from 1692)	Sophia of the Palatinate; 30 September 1658; Heidelberg seven children	23 January 1698; Herrenhausen Palace aged 68	In 1692, he was appointed Prince-elector by Leopold I, Holy Roman Emperor, thus raising the House of Welf to electoral dignity. The old Principality of Calenberg thus adopted the new name of Electorate of Hanover.
George I Louis	28 May 1660; Hanover; Son of Ernest Augustus I and Sophia of the Palatinate	23 January 1698 – 11 June 1727	Electorate of Hanover	Sophia Dorothea of Brunswick-Lüneburg; 22 November 1682; Celle (annulled 1694) two children	11 June 1727; Osnabrück aged 67	The electorship became effective under his rule. In 1705 reunited his father-in-law's princedom of Lüneburg to the Electorate. In 1714 was chosen for King of Great Britain, starting a personal union between Hanover and this new country. Lüneburg was definitely annexed to the Electorate. Thus the Wolfenbüttel was the remaining old land of Brunswick-Lüneburg that remained separate.
Augustus William	8 March 1662; Wolfenbüttel; Son of Anton Ulrich and Elisabeth Juliana of Schleswig-Holstein-Sonderburg-Norburg	27 March 1714 – 23 March 1731	Principality of Wolfenbüttel	Christine Sophie of Brunswick-Wolfenbüttel; 1681 no children Sophie Amalie of Holstein-Gottorp; 1695 no children Elisabeth Sophie Marie of Schleswig-Holstein-Sonderborg-Norburg; 1710 no children	23 March 1731; Wolfenbüttel aged 69	Ruler of the only land that was still not in Hanoverian lands, to which it would never belong.
George II Augustus	30 October/9 November 1683^{O.S./N.S.} Herrenhausen Palace; Son of George I Louis and Sophia Dorothea of Brunswick-Lüneburg	11 June 1727 – 25 October 1760	Electorate of Hanover	Wilhelmina Charlotte Caroline of Brandenburg-Ansbach; 22 August / 2 September 1705^{O.S./N.S.} Hanover ten children	25 October 1760; Kensington Palace, London aged 76	In personal union with Great Britain.
Louis Rudolph	22 July 1671; Wolfenbüttel; Son of	23 March 1731 – 1 March 1735	Principality of Wolfenbüttel	Christine Louise of Oettingen-Oettingen; 22 April 1690; Aurich three children	1 March 1735; Braunschweig aged 63	Left no male heirs, and his land passed to a collateral line.
Ferdinand Albert II	29 May 1680; Bevern; Son of Ferdinand Albert I and Christina Wilhelmina of Hesse-Eschwege	23 April 1687 – 2 September 1735 1 March – 2 September 1735	Principality of Wolfenbüttel (at Bevern until March 1735) Principality of Wolfenbüttel (at Wolfenbüttel proper from March 1735)	Antoinette Amalie of Brunswick-Wolfenbüttel; 15 October 1712; Braunschweig thirteen children	2 September 1735; Salzdahlum aged 55	Grandson of Augustus II, and from a collateral line of Brunswick-Bevern the family), succeeded in 1735. He was married to the daughter of the previous ruler.
Charles I	1 August 1713; Braunschweig; Son of Ferdinand Albert II and Antoinette Amalie of Brunswick-Wolfenbüttel	2 September 1735 – 26 March 1780	Principality of Wolfenbüttel	Philippine Charlotte of Prussia; 2 June 1733; Berlin thirteen children	26 March 1780; Braunschweig aged 66	Founder of the Collegium Carolinum in Brunswick, the porcelain makers of Fürstenberg, the fire office; in 1753 the Residence was moved to Brunswick.
George III William Frederick	4 June 1738; Norfolk House, London; Son of Frederick, Prince of Wales and Augusta of Saxe-Gotha	25 October 1760 – 29 January 1820	Electorate of Hanover (until 1814); Kingdom of Hanover (from 1814)	Charlotte of Mecklenburg-Strelitz; 8 September 1761; London fifteen children	29 January 1820; Windsor Castle, Berkshire aged 81	In personal union with Great Britain.
Regency of Prince George of the United Kingdom (1811–1820)						In personal union with Great Britain.
Charles II William Ferdinand	9 October 1735; Wolfenbüttel; Son of Charles I and Philippine Charlotte of Prussia	26 March 1780 – 10 November 1806	Principality of Wolfenbüttel	Augusta of Great Britain; 16 January 1764; London seven children	10 November 1806; Ottensen aged 71	Due to financial problems, was obliged to replace his father. He was the head of the Prussian Army; died in the Battle of Jena; because his son and heir died young, and two other sons were not eligible, rule passed to his youngest son.
With the dissolution of the Holy Roman Empire in 1806, the title of Duke of Brunswick-Lüneburg ceased to exist. However, its successor states continued.
Frederick William the Black Duke	9 October 1771; Braunschweig; Son of Charles II William Ferdinand and Augusta of Great Britain	16 October 1806 – 8 July 1807 1813 – 16 June 1815	Principality of Wolfenbüttel (until 1807) Duchy of Brunswick (from 1813)	Marie Elisabeth Wilhelmine of Baden; 1 November 1802; Karlsruhe three children	16 June 1815; Quatre Bras aged 43	Duke of Oels/Silesia, the "Black Duke"; recruited a Freikorps (volunteer corps), the Black Brunswickers, at the outbreak of the War of the Fifth Coalition in Bohemia in 1809, and made his way via Brunswick to the North Sea and then on to Great Britain.
On the Eve of Napoleonic era, in 1807 the Duchy was briefly annexed to the Kingdom of France, to appear again in 1813 as Duchy of Brunswick.
Regency of Prince George of the United Kingdom (1815–1823)						On the eve of the July Revolution of 1830, Charles was in Paris, and did not manage to keep the duchy for himself; his brother William took over with the agreement of the people and his international neighbours.
Charles II	30 October 1804; Braunschweig; First son of Frederick William and Marie of Baden	16 June 1815 – 9 September 1830	Duchy of Brunswick	Unmarried	18 August 1873; Geneva aged 68	On the eve of the July Revolution of 1830, Charles was in Paris, and did not manage to keep the duchy for himself; his brother William took over with the agreement of the people and his international neighbours.
George IV Augustus Frederick	12 August 1762; St James's Palace, London; First son of George III William Frederick and Charlotte of Mecklenburg-Strelitz	29 January 1820 – 26 June 1830	Kingdom of Hanover	Caroline Amelia Elizabeth of Brunswick-Wolfenbüttel; 8 April 1795; London one child	26 June 1830; Windsor Castle, Berkshire aged 67	In personal union with the United Kingdom. Named regent of his father due to his illness, succeeding him after his death in 1820. Left no male descendants. The Kingdom passed to his brother.
William IV Henry	21 August 1765; Buckingham House, London; Third son of George III William Frederick and Charlotte of Mecklenburg-Strelitz	9 September 1830 – 20 June 1837	Kingdom of Hanover	Adelaide of Saxe-Meiningen; 13 July 1818; London four children	20 June 1837; Windsor Castle, Berkshire aged 71	In personal union with the United Kingdom. Usually numbered IV as King of Hanover and the United Kingdom. As he left only illegitimate descendants, the land passed to his brother.
William	25 April 1806; Braunschweig; Second son of Frederick William and Marie of Baden	9 September 1830 – 18 October 1884	Duchy of Brunswick	Unmarried	18 October 1884; Sybillenort aged 78	
Victoria	24 May 1819; Kensington Palace, London; Daughter of Prince Edward, Duke of Kent and Strathearn and Victoria of Saxe-Coburg-Saalfeld	20 June 1837 – 22 January 1901	United Kingdom	Albert of Saxe-Coburg and Gotha; 10 February 1840; St James's Palace nine children	22 January 1901; Osborne House, Isle of Wight aged 81	End of personal union with the United Kingdom, as in this country the successor in 1837 was Queen Victoria, niece of William Henry. In Hanover the Salic Law was still active.
Ernest Augustus	5 June 1771; Buckingham House, London; Fifth son of George III William Frederick and Charlotte of Mecklenburg-Strelitz	20 June 1837 – 18 November 1851	Kingdom of Hanover	Frederica of Mecklenburg-Strelitz; 29 May 1815; Neustrelitz three children	18 November 1851; Hanover aged 80	End of personal union with the United Kingdom, as in this country the successor in 1837 was Queen Victoria, niece of William Henry. In Hanover the Salic Law was still active.
George V Frederick	27 May 1819; Berlin; Son of Ernest Augustus and Frederica of Mecklenburg-Strelitz	18 November 1851 – 20 September 1866	Kingdom of Hanover	Marie of Saxe-Altenburg; 18 February 1843; Hanover three children	12 June 1878; Paris aged 59	His reign was ended by the Austro-Prussian War, which led to the annexation of his kingdom to Prussia.
Hanover annexed to the Kingdom of Prussia
Regency of Prince Albert of Prussia (1885–1906); Regency of Duke John Albert of Mecklenburg-Schwerin (1906–1913)						His regency came to an end on 1 November 1913 when Ernest Augustus, Crown Prince of Hanover's son, was permitted to ascend to Duchy following his marriage to Princess Victoria Louise of Prussia. In 1918, with the abolition of the monarchy, all nobles titles were equally abolished.
Ernest Augustus	17 November 1887; Penzing; Son of Ernest Augustus, Crown Prince of Hanover and Thyra of Denmark	1 November 1913 – 8 November 1918	Brunswick	Victoria Louise of Prussia; 24 May 1913; Berlin five children	30 January 1953; Marienburg Castle (Hanover) aged 65	His regency came to an end on 1 November 1913 when Ernest Augustus, Crown Prince of Hanover's son, was permitted to ascend to Duchy following his marriage to Princess Victoria Louise of Prussia. In 1918, with the abolition of the monarchy, all nobles titles were equally abolished.

== Territorial Growth ==
Growth of Brunswick-Luneburg into covering the Stem Duchy of (Lower) Saxony
Stammesherzogtuemer of Saxony c. 1000

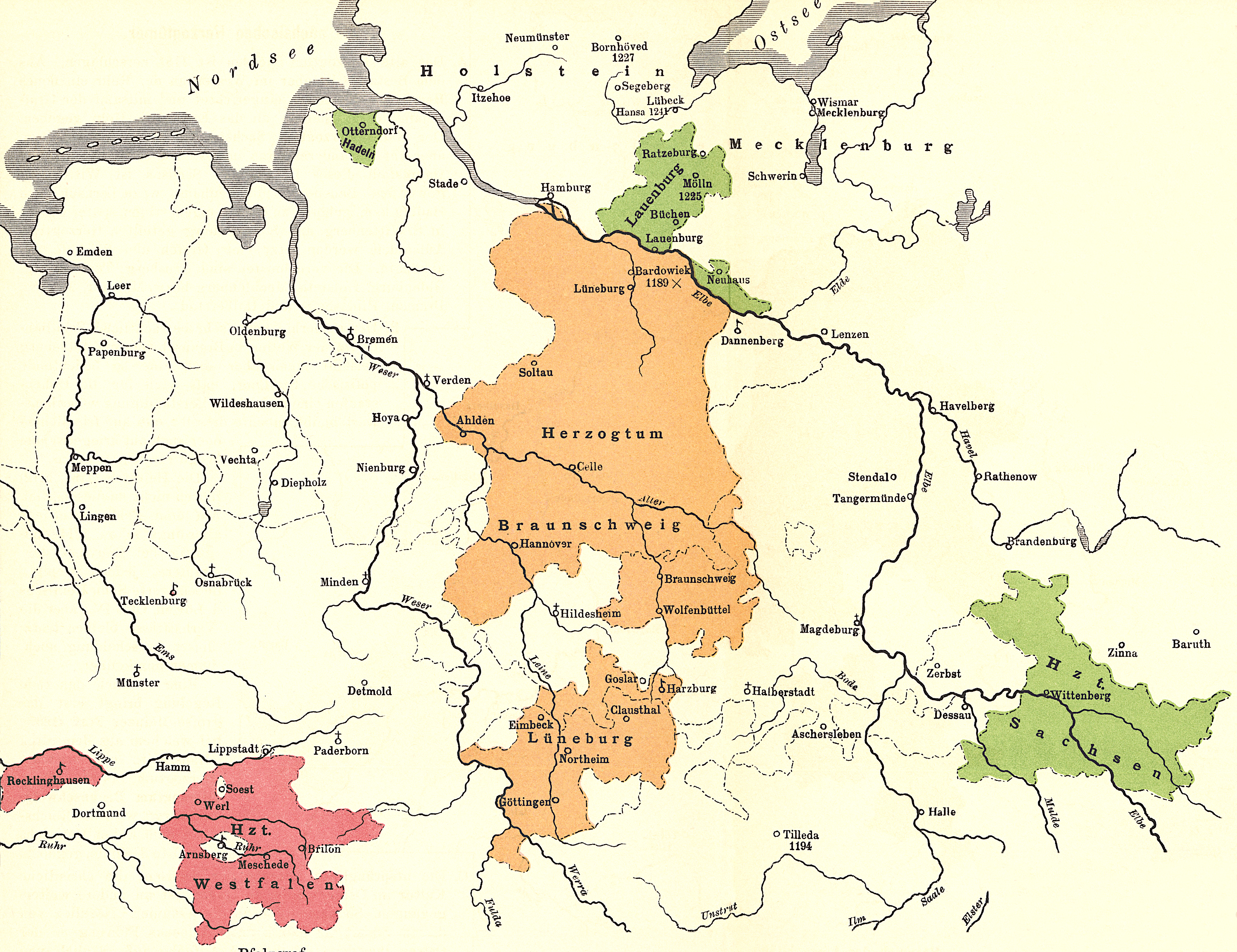
Saxon Duchies c. 1235

Lower Saxony, 1250

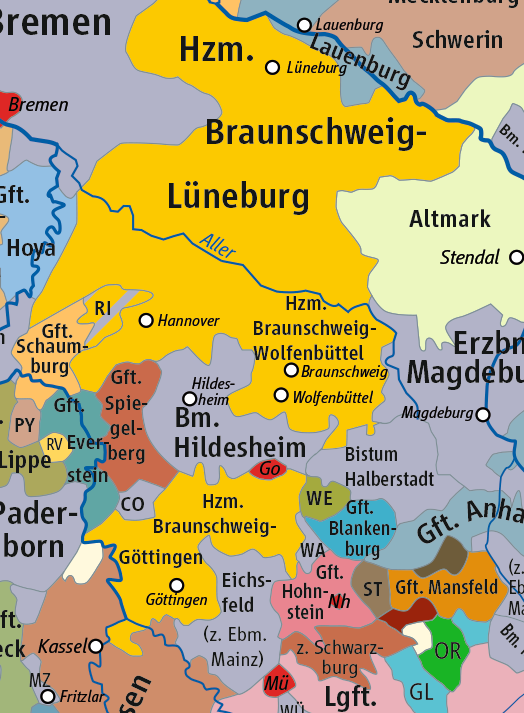
Brunswick-Luneburg, 1400

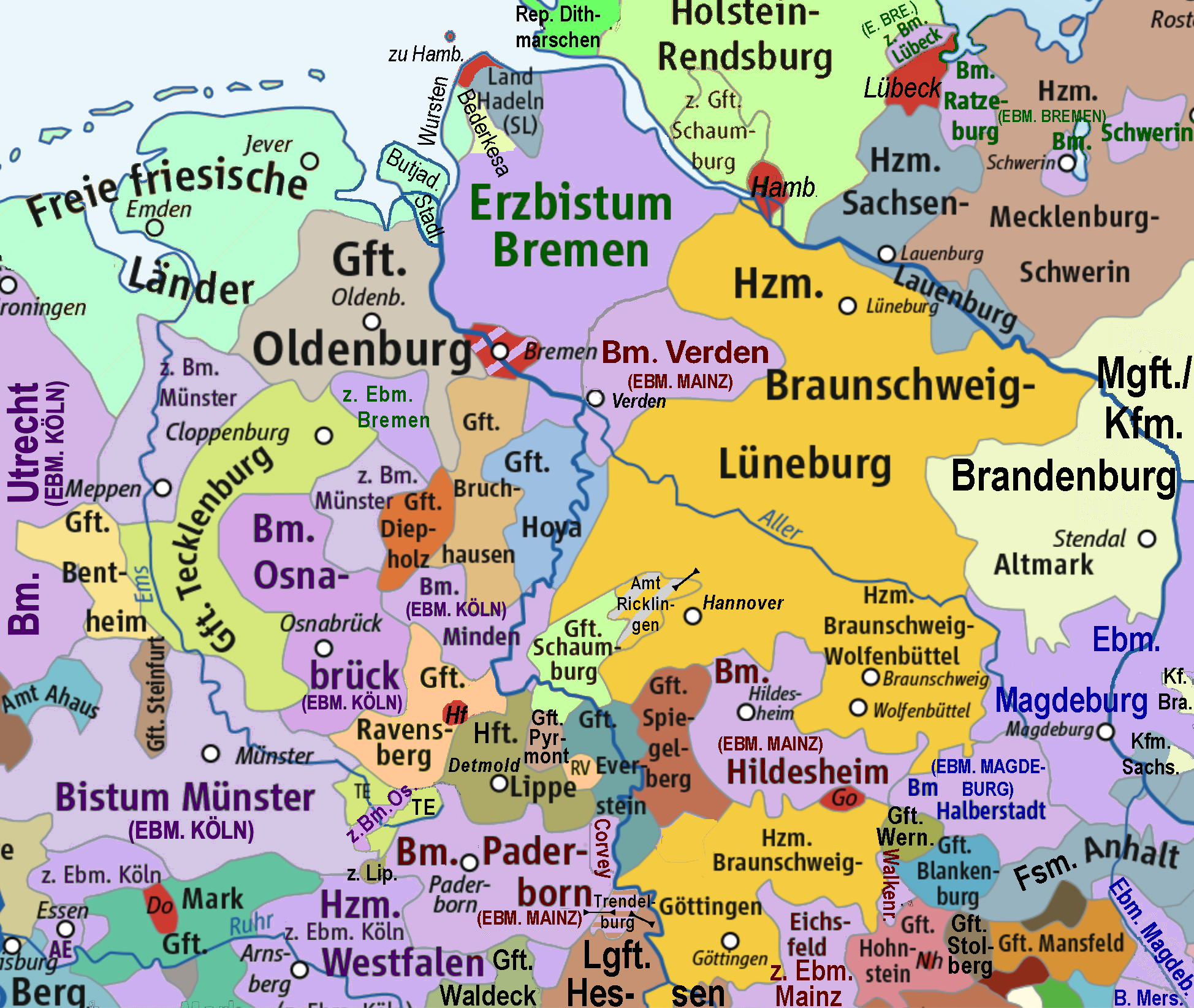
Lower Saxony, 1400

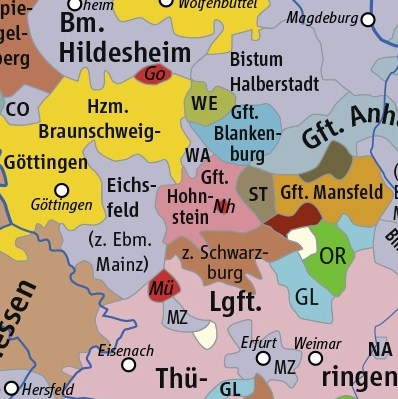
Principality of Göttingen

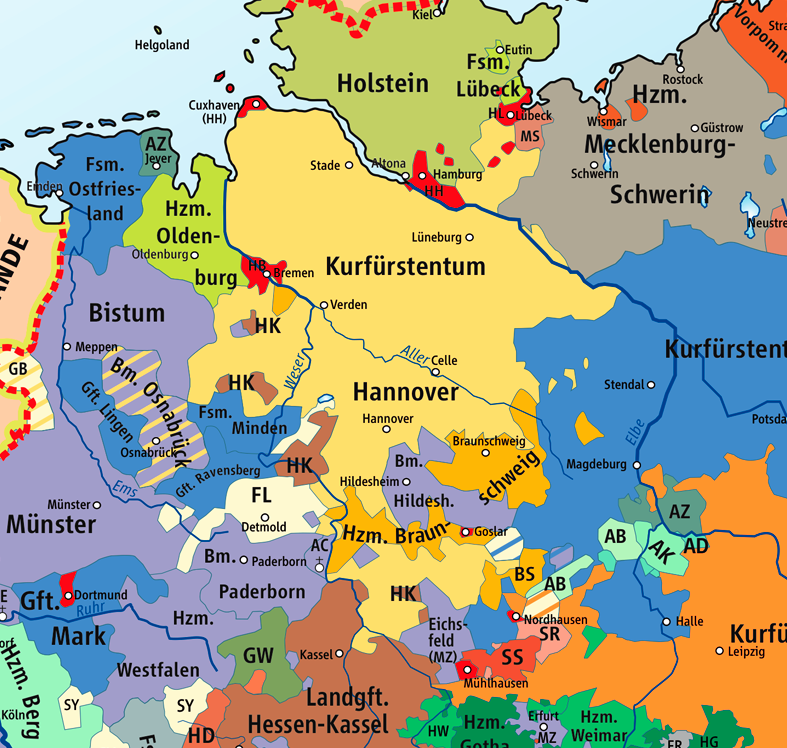
Map of the Electorate of Brunswick-Lüneburg 1789, Ausschnitt

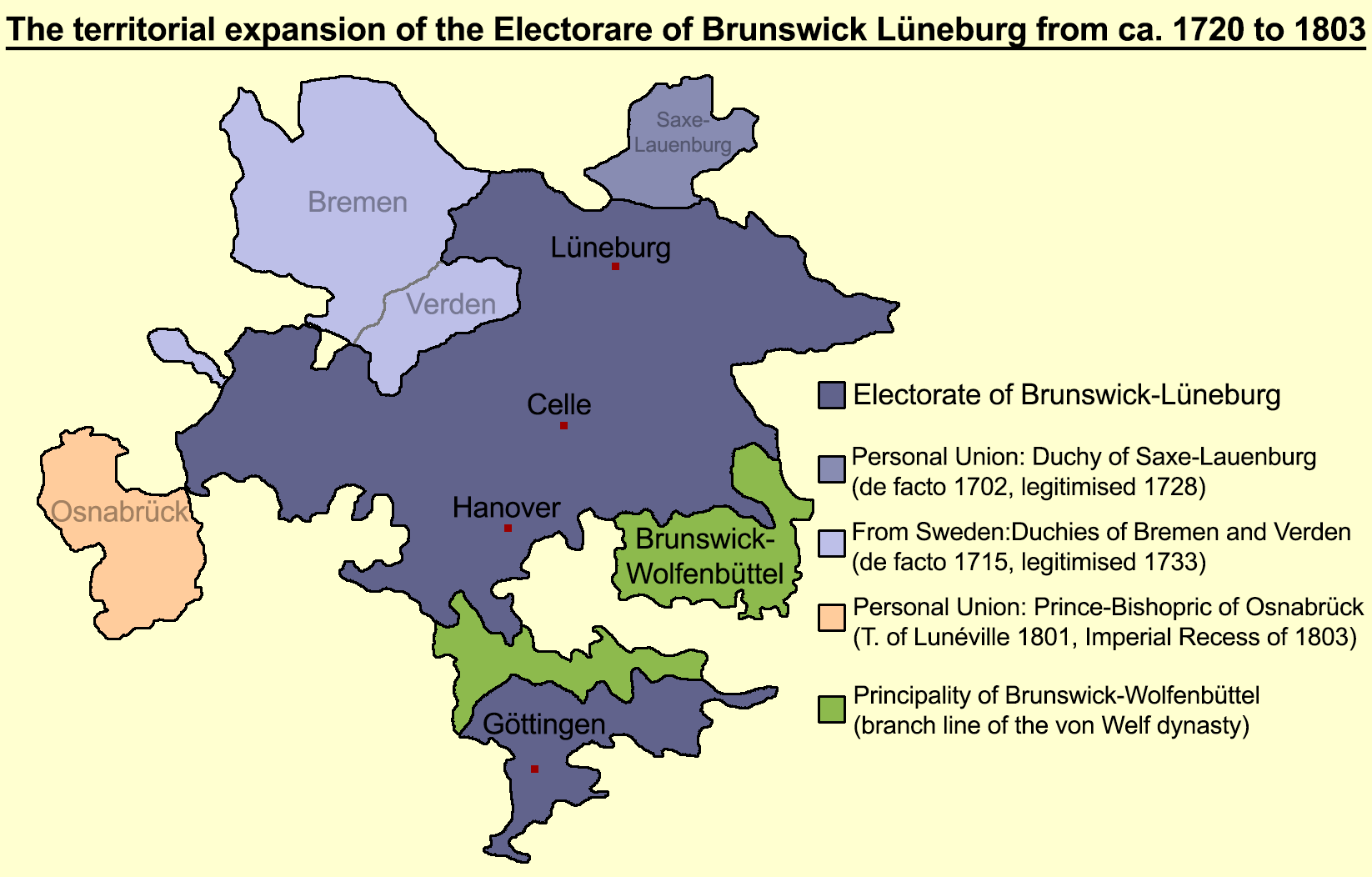
Territorial Expansion of Brunswick-Luneburg into the Electorate covering most of the Stem duchy of Saxony

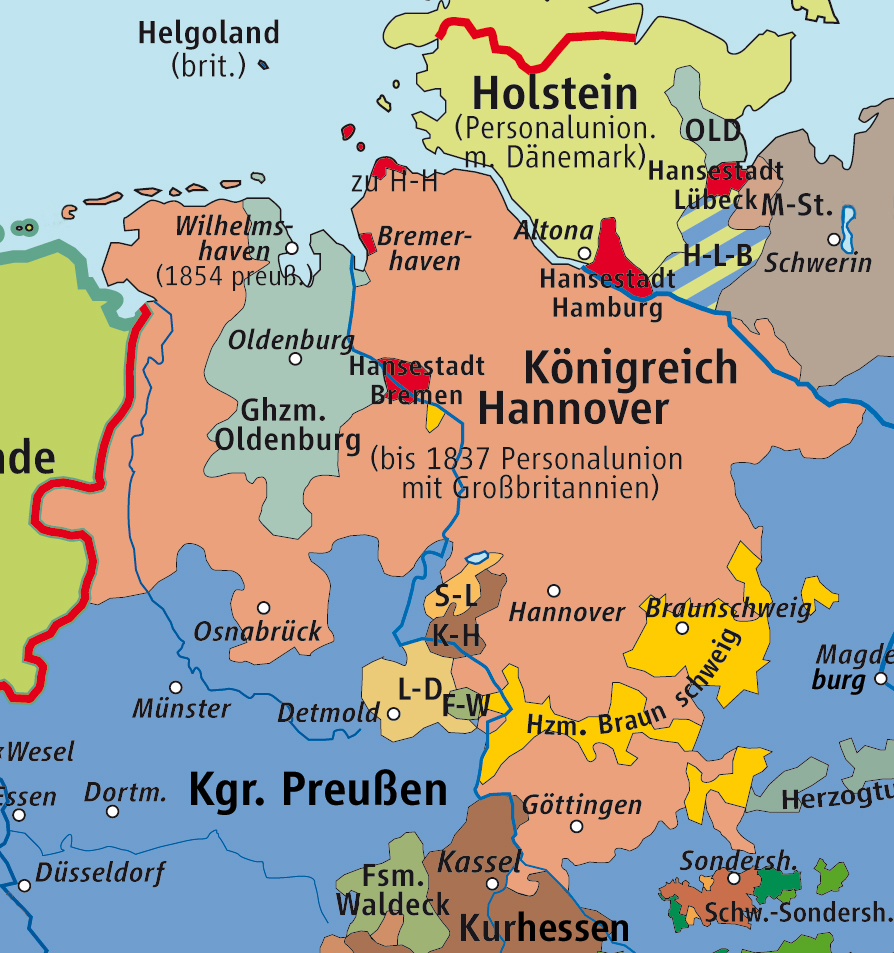
Kingdom of Hanover, 1815–1866 comprising most of old Stem duchy of Saxony

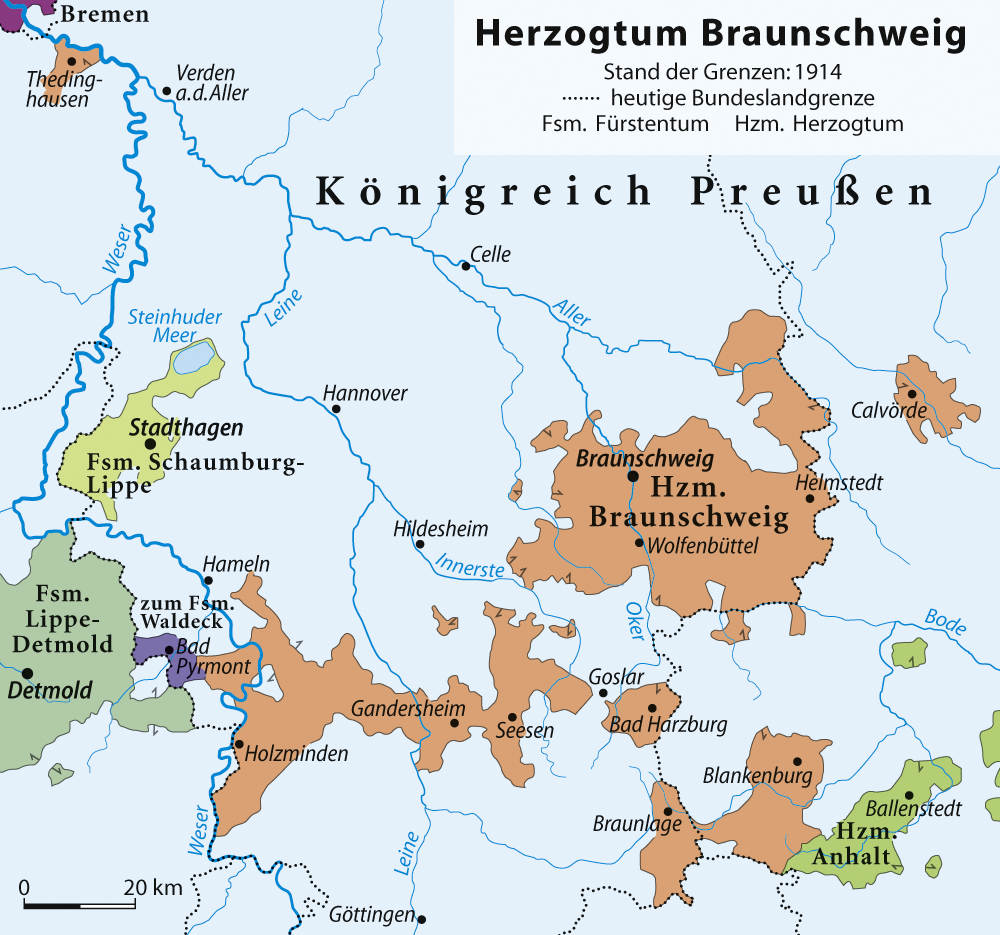
Duchy of Brunswick, 1914

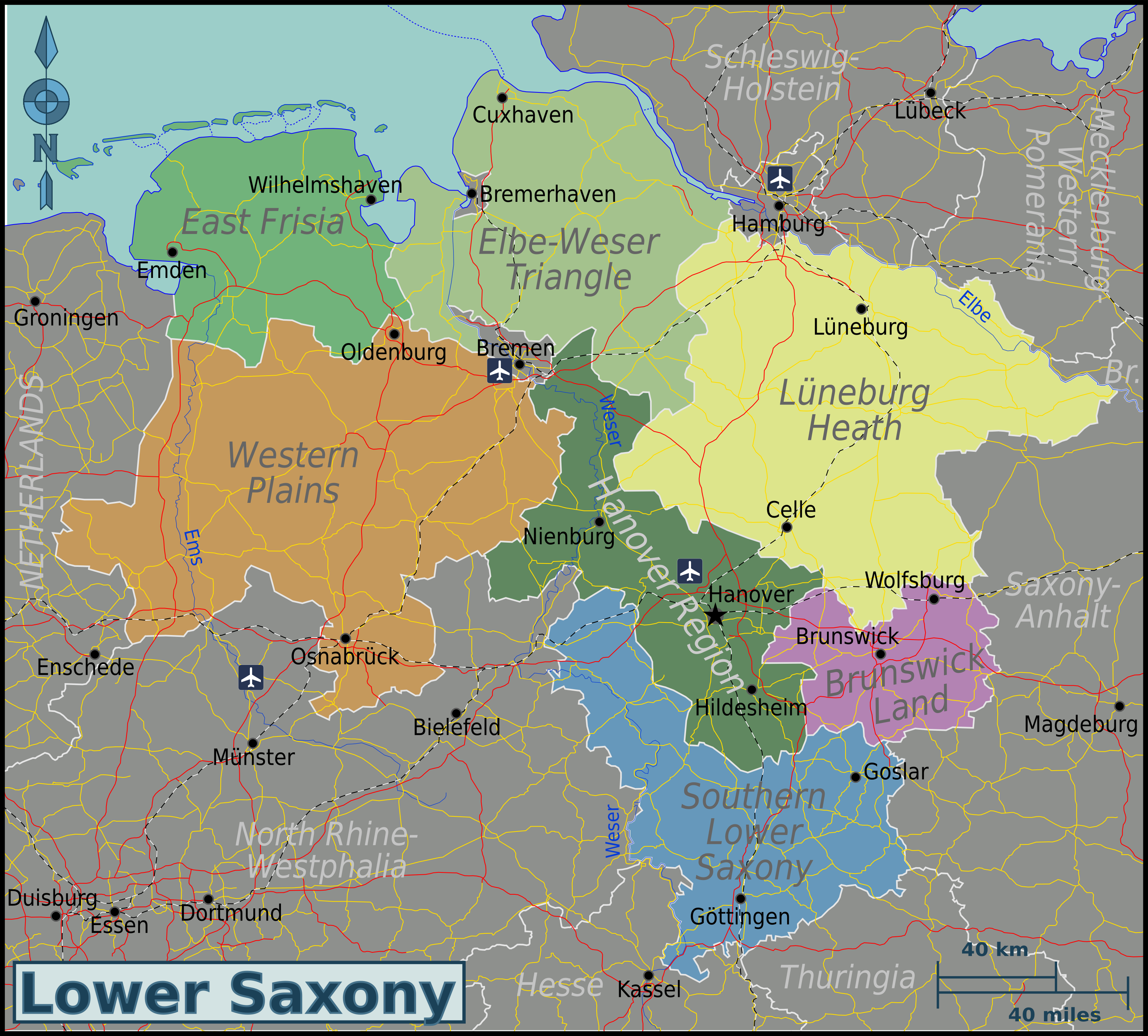
Map of the State of Lower Saxony of which the K. of Hannover comprises almost 85%.

== Family trees ==
=== Welf family tree 12th century ===
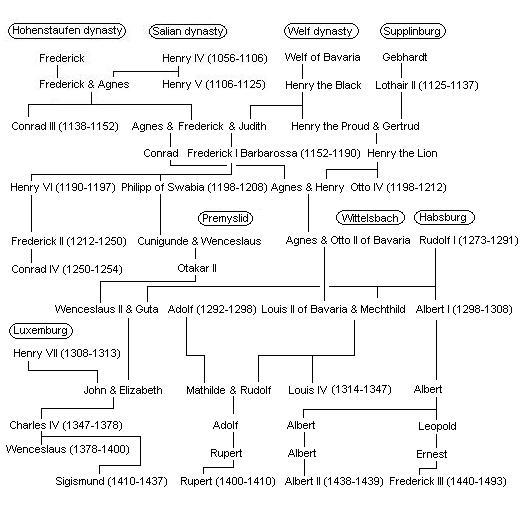

=== Family Tree of the House of Welf to Otto the Child ===
Stammbaum der Jüngere Welfinger bis zum Otto das Kind (House of Welf)

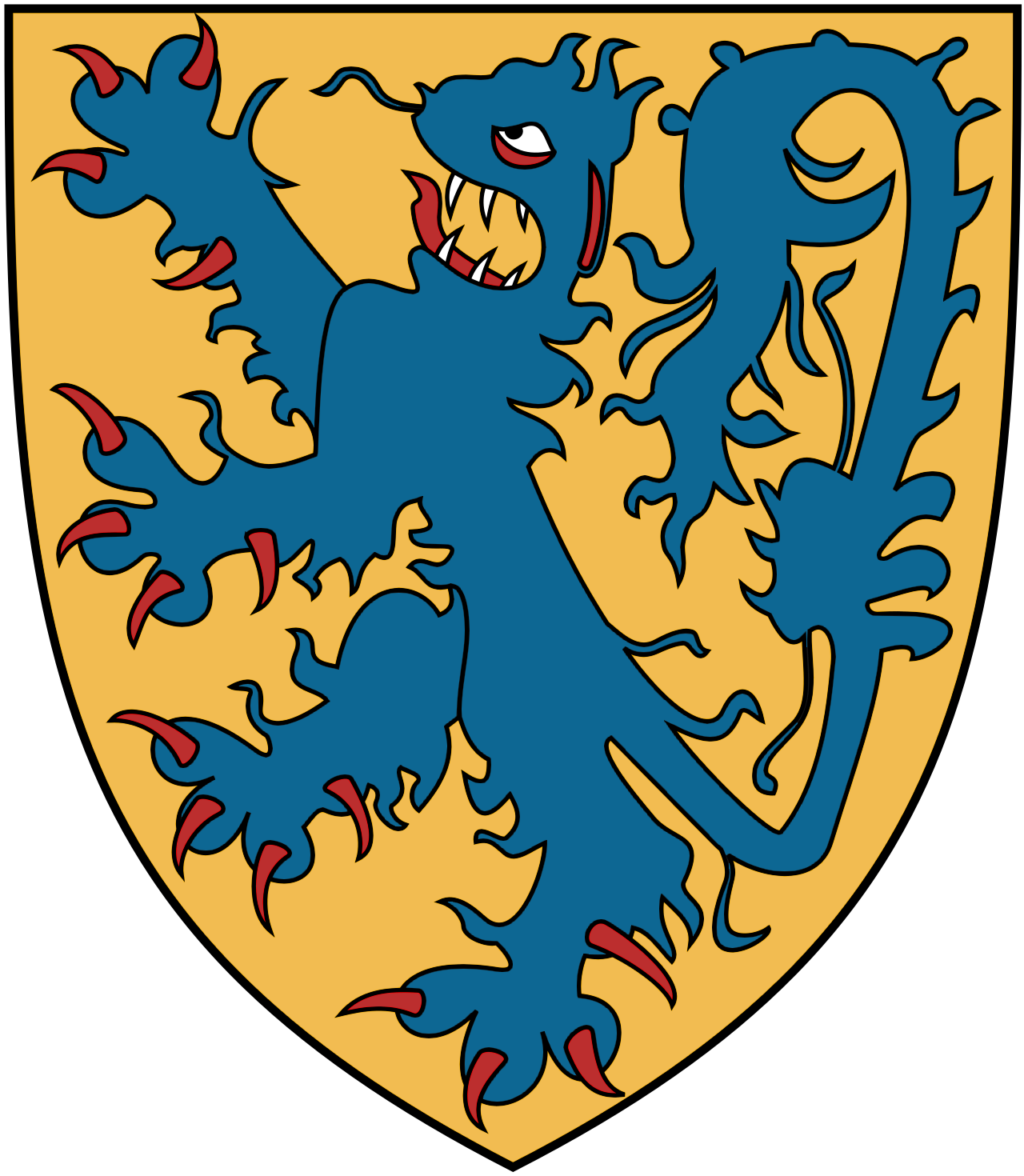
**Welf IV & I of Bavaria** (c. 1035/1040–1101) Duke of Bavaria (1070–1077) as Welf I	Fulco I of Milan; Margrave of Este
**(Younger) House of Welf**	**House of Este**	**Henry IV** (Salian) (1050 –1106), Emperor,1084–1105, K. of Germany,1054
Lothair III (1075–1137) Holy Roman Emperor (1133–1137)	**Welf V & II of Bavaria** (c. 1035/1040 –1101) Duke of Bavaria (1070–1077)	**Henry "the Black"** (1075–1126); Duke of Bavaria (Henry IX) (1120–1126) [1]	Frederick of Staufen (c.1050–1105), inv. by Henry IV as Duke of Swabia (Fred. I), 1079	Agnes of Waiblingen (1072/73–1143)
Gertrude of Süpplingenburg (1115–1143)	**Henry the Proud** (c. 1108–1139); Duke of Bavaria (as Henry X) (1126–1138), Duke of Saxony (as Henry II), Margrave of Tuscany and Duke of Spoleto, 1137	4 children: Konrad (d. 1126) Sophie (d. bef. 1147) Mathilde (d. 1183) Wulfhild (d. after1160)	Welf VI (1115–1191), margrave of Tuscany (1152–1162), duke of Spoleto (1152–1162),	Judith of Bavaria, Duchess of Swabia (1100 –1130)	Frederick II of Swabia (1090–1147); Duke of Swabia ,1105	**Conrad III**; 1093/ 1094–1152), Duke of Franconia (1116–1120), anti-K. of Germany (1127–1135), (1138–1152)
Henry the Lion (1129/1131–1195); Duke of Saxony (Henry III),1142–1180; Duke of Bavaria (Henry XII) 1156–1180 (attributed)	Matilda of England, Duchess of Saxony (1156–1189), d. of K. Henry II of England	Frederick I Barbarossa (1122–1190), Holy Roman Emperor (1155–1190
4 others: Gertrud (d. 1196) Richenza (Mathilde) (d. 1208) Lothar (d. 1190) Mathilde (d. 1219)	William of Winchester, Lord of Lüneburg/"Longsword" (1184–1213)	Henry V, Count Palatine of the Rhine (c. 1173–1227)	Otto IV (c. 1175–1218); Emperor, 1209–1218, Duke of Swabia	Philip (1177–1208), King of Germany/the Romans, 1198; Duke of Swabia, 1196–1208	Frederick V (1164–1170); Duke of Swabia, 1167	**Henry VI** (1165–1197); Emperor,1191, King of Sicily,1194 (in right of wife)
**Otto the Child** (~1204–1252),duke of Brunswick-Lüneburg,1235	Beatrice of Swabia (1198–1212), Empress, 1212	**Frederick II** "Stupor Mundi" (1194–1250); Emperor,1220; King of Sicily,1220

[1]: Henry the Black, about 1095, acquired part of the Billung estates around Lüneburg, which was the nucleus of the later Welf duchy of Brunswick-Lüneburg.

=== Family Tree of the House of Welf from Otto the Child to the 17th Century ===
Family tree of the Younger Welfinger line of Otto the Child until the 16th century (House of Welf)

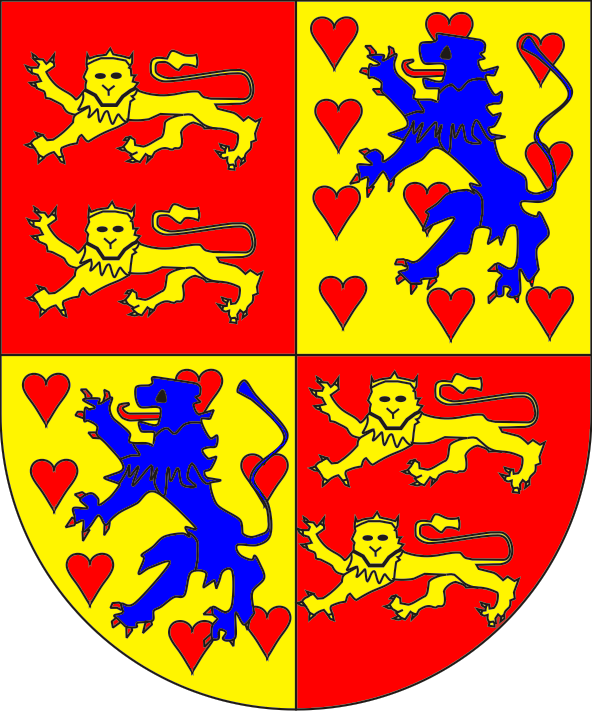
**Otto the Child** (~1204–1252) duke of Brunswick-Lüneburg, 1235
After Otto the Child the Welfs started splitting their estates between each son.	Albrecht I (1236–1279); D. of Brunswick in Wolfenbüttel, Calenberg and Göttingen in division of 1267	Johann (1242–1277); D. of Brunswick in Lüneburg in division of 1267
**Henry the Wonderful** (1267–1322); D. of Brunswick in Grubenhagen, 1291	4 Including: William (c.1270–1292); D. of Brunswick in Brunswick, Schöningen, etc., 1291 Otto (d. ~1346), Knight Templar; Lothair (1275–1335), Grand Master of the Teutonic Knights, 1331. Conrad (d. <1304) Hospitaller	**Albert II the Fat** (1268–1318); D. of Brunswick in Göttingen & Brunswick, 1291	**Otto II the Strict** (~1266–1330); D. of Brunswick in Lüneburg
Henry II (before 1296 – after 1351); D. of Brunswick in Grubenhagen, 1324 + Albert (c. 1284– >1341), Teutonic Knight + William, Duke of Brunswick-Grubenhagen (c. 1298–1360)	Ernest I (c. 1297–1361); D. of Brunswick in Grubenhagen, 1324	Magnus I the Pious (1304–1369); D. of Brunswick z. Wolfenbüttel, 1345	Otto the Mild (1292–1344); D. of Brunswick z. Brunswick, 1345	Ernest I (c. 1305–1367); Duke of Brunswick z. Göttingen, 1345	William II (about 1300–1369; Duke of Brunswick z. Lüneburg, 1330	Otto III (c. 1296–1352); Duke of Brunswick z. Lüneburg, 1330
Frederick I (c. 1350–1421); Duke of Brunswick z. Osterode (C. of Osterode, 1361	Albert I (c. 1339 – probably 1383); Duke of Brunswick z. Grubenhagen & Salzderhelden	Magnus II with the Necklace (c. 1324 – 25 July 1373); Duke of Brunswick z. Brunswick-Lüneburg, Wolfenbüttel, Lüneburg	**Luneburg**	Otto I the Evil (c. 1340–1394); Duke of Brunswick z. Göttingen
**Grubenhagen**	Eric I (c. 1383–1427); Duke of Brunswick z. Grubenhagen, 1383	Frederick I (c. 1357 – murdered 1400); Duke of Brunswick z. Wolfenbüttel, elected King of Germany, May 1400	Bernard I (c.1358 to 1364–1434); Duke of Brunswick z. Lüneburg, 1385	HenryII or III the Mild (1373–1416); Duke of Brunswick z. Lüneburg, 1400 & Wolfenbüttel, 1409	Otto II the One-eyed (c. 1380 – 6 February 1463); Duke of Brunswick z. Göttingen, 1394–1463
Henry III (1416–1464); Duke of Brunswick z. Grubenhagen, 1427	Albert II (1419–1485); Duke of Brunswick z. Grubenhagen, 1440	Frederick II the Pious (1418–78); Duke of Brunswick z. Lüneburg, 1434	Otto IV the Lame (–1466); Duke of Brunswick z. Lüneburg, 1434	William I, III, IV the Victorious (1392–1482); Duke of Brunswick z. Lüneburg 1416–28, Wolfenbüttel, 1428–32, 1473–82, Göttingen 1450–73, Calenberg, 1432–73	Henry the Peaceful (1411–1473); Duke of Brunswick z. Lüneburg, 1416–28, Wolfenbüttel, 1428–73
Henry IV (1460–1526); Duke of Brunswick z. Grubenhagen, 1464	Philip I (1476–1551); Duke of Brunswick z. Grubenhagen, 1485 + 2 others Eric b. of Paderborn and Osnabrück & ALbert (d. 1485)	Otto V the Victorious (Siegreiche) or the Magnanimous (Großmütige) (1439–1471); Duke of Brunswick z. Lüneburg, 1464	Bernhard II (about 1437–1464); Bishop of Hildesheim (as Bernard III), 1452–1457; Duke of Brunswick z. Lüneburg, 1457	William IV the Younger ((c. 1425–1503); Duke of Brunswick z. Lüneburg, 1473, Wolfenbüttel, 1482–91, Calenberg, 1484-91, Göttingen, 1484-95	Frederick III the Restless (1424–1495); Duke of Brunswick z. Lüneburg,Göttingen, Calenberg, 1482–1484	**Wolfenbuttel**
Ernest III or IV (1518–1567); Duke of Brunswick z. Grubenhagen, 1551–67	Wolfgang (1531–1595); Brunswick z. Grubenhagen, 1567–95	Phlip II (1533–1596); Brunswick z. Grubenhagen, 1595–1596	Henry the Middle (1468 – 1532); Duke of Brunswick z. Lüneburg, 1486–1520	William (d. 1470)	Henry IV the Elder (1463–1514); Duke of Brunswick z. Lüneburg, z. Calenberg, 1491–94, z.Wolfenbüttel, 1491–94, z. Wolfenbüttel, 1494–1514	Eric I the Elder (1470–1540); Imperial General; Duke of Brunswick z. Lüneburg, z. Wolfenbüttel, 1491–94, Calenberg, 1491–1540, Göttingen, 1495
**Harburg**	Otto I of Harburg (1495–1549); Duke of Brunswick z. Lüneburg, 1520-27, Harburg, 1527–49	Ernest I the Confessor; Duke of Brunswick z. Lüneburg, 1520-46	Francis (1508–1549); Duke of Brunswick-Lüneburg, 1536–39, z. Gifhorn, 1539–49	Henry V the Younger (1489–1568); Duke of Brunswick z. Lüneburg, 1514–68	Francis of Brunswick-Wolfenbüttel, Bishop of Minden (c.1492–1529) George of Brunswick-Wolfenbüttel, Archbishop of Bremen (1494–1566); Eric of Brunswick-Wolfenbüttel (c. 1500–1553), joined the Teutonic Order. William of Brunswick-Wolfenbüttel (died c. 1557), joined the Teutonic Order	Eric II (1528–1584); Duke of Brunswick & Lüneburg z. Calenberg, 1540–84, then falls to Duke Julius
James I, King of England	Otto II the Younger, or the Famous (1528–1603); Duke of Brunswick- Lüneburg z. Harburg, 1549–1603	Francis Otto (1530–1559); Duke of Brunswick-Lüneburg z. Lüneburg, 1555–59	Henry III (1533–1598); Duke of Brunswick- Lüneburg z. Lüneburg, 1559–69, z. Dannenberg 1569–1598	William the Younger (1535–1592); Duke of Brunswick-Lüneburg z. Lüneburg, 1559–92	Julius (1528–1589); Duke of Brunswick-Lüneburg z. Wolfenbüttel, 1568–89
Elizabeth Stuart, Queen of Bohemia	William Augustus (1564–1642); Duke of Brunswick-Lüneburg z. Harburg, 1603–1642	Christopher (1570–1606); Duke of Brunswick-Lüneburg z. Harburg, 1603–1606	Otto III(1572–1641); Duke of Brunswick-Lüneburg z. Harburg, 1606–1641	**Wolfenbuttel (see)**	George Odysseus (1582–1641); Duke of Brunswick-Lüneburg z.Calenberg,1635–1641	6 sons incl: * Ernest II (1564–1611), z. Lüneburg, 1592–1611: Christian (1566–1633)z. Lüneburg, 1611–1633; Augustus the Elder (1568–1636), z. Lüneburg , 1633–1636; Fred. IV (1574–1648) z. Lüneburg, 1636–1648	Henry Julius (1564–1613); Duke of Brunswick-Lüneburg z. Wolfenbüttel, 1589–1613
Charles I Louis; Elector Palatine of the Rhine	Prince Rupert of the Rhine	Sophia of the Palatine	Ernest Augustus, Elector of Hanover	Frederick Ulrich (1591–1634); Duke of Brunswick-Lüneburg z. Wolfenbüttel, 1613–1634
Charles II, Elector Palatine	Elizabeth Charlotte, Madame Palatine, Duchess of Orleans

=== Welf family tree 16th century to present ===
==== Brunswick-Wolfenbuttel ====
Stammbaum der älterer (Wolfenbuttel) Welfinger von 16. nach 19. Jahrhundert (House of Welf)

Henry III (1533 –1598); Duke of Brunswick- Lüneburg z. Lüneburg, 1559–69, z. Dannenberg 1569-98
Julius Ernst (1571–1636); Duke of Brunswick- Lüneburg z. Lüneburg, & z. Dannenberg 1598–1636, z. Wolfenbüttel, 1634–1636	Augustus the Younger (1579–1666); Duke of Brunswick- Lüneburg z. Lüneburg, & z. Dannenberg, 1636–1666, z. Wolfenbüttel,1636–1666
Rudolph Augustus (1627–1704); Duke of Brunswick- Lüneburg z. Lüneburg, & z. Dannenberg, z. Wolfenbüttel,1666–1704	Anthony Ulrich (1633–1714); Duke of Brunswick- Lüneburg z. Lüneburg, & z. Dannenberg, z. Wolfenbüttel ,1704–1714	Ferdinand Albert I (1636–1687); Duke of Brunswick- Lüneburg z. Bevern
Augustus William (1662–1731); Duke of Brunswick- Lüneburg z. Lüneburg, & z. Dannenberg, z. Wolfenbüttel,1714–1731	Louis Rudolph ( 1671–1735); Duke of Brunswick-Lüneburg z. Lüneburg, & z. Dannenberg, z. Wolfenbüttel, 1731–1735	Ferdinand Albert II (1680–1735); Duke of Brunswick- Lüneburg z. Bevern, 1687–1735, z. Wolfenbüttel, 1735
Elisabeth Christine of Brunswick-Wolfenbüttel m. Charles VI, Holy Roman Emperor (Austria)	Charlotte m. Alexei Petrovich, Tsarevich of Russia (s. of Peter the Great)	Antoinette m. her cousin Ferdinand Albert II	Charles I (1713–1780); Duke of Brunswick- Lüneburg z. Wolfenbüttel,1735–1780	Anthony Ulrich (1714–1774); Duke of Brunswick- Lüneburg m.Anna Leopoldovna of Russia, granddaughter of Tsar Ivan V, bro. of Peter the Great	Louis Ernst (1718–1788); Duke of Brunswick- Lüneburg; Duke of Courland, 1741; Field Marshal of Dutch States Army, 1749–1784	Elisabeth Christine of Brunswick-Wolfenbüttel-Bevern m. Frederick II the Great, King of Prussia	4 other sons, and 4 daughters Ferdinand (1721–1792) Luise Amalie (1722–1780) Sophie Antoinette (1724–1802) Albrecht (1725–1745) Christine Charlotte (1726–1766) Therese Natalie (1728–1778) Juliane Marie (1729–1766) Friedrich Franz (1732–1758)
Maria Theresa; Holy Roman Empress, Queen of Bohemia and Hungary	Peter II, Emperor of Russia, 1727–1730, grandson of Peter the Great (Romanov)	Charles II (1735–1806); Duke of Brunswick-Lüneburg z. Wolfenbüttel,1780–1806	4 sons, 4 daughters Sophie Karoline (1737–1817) Friedrich August (1740–1805) Albert (1742–1761) Wilhelm Adolf (1745–1770) Elisabeth (1746–1840) Auguste Dorothee (1749–1810) Leopold (1752–1785)	Ivan VI of Russia, Emperor of Russia, 1740–41 (dep.), Great-grandson of Ivan V	Peter Antonovich	Alexei Antonovich
Frederick William the Black Duke (1771–1815), d. at Battle of Quatre Bras; Duke of Brunswick- Lüneburg z. Wolfenbüttel,1806–1807, 1813–1815	5 others: Auguste (1764–1788) Karl (1766–1806) Karoline (1768–1821) Georg (1769–1811) August (1770–1820)
Charles II (1804–1873); Duke of Brunswick-Lüneburg z. Wolfenbüttel, 1815–1830	William (1806–1884); Duke of Brunswick-Lüneburg z. Wolfenbüttel,1830–1884
**Brunswick-Wolfenbuttel inherited by (younger) Hanoverian Line (see)**

==== House of Hanover ====
Some direct ancestors (fathers and sons) of the present generation are:

- Ernest Augustus, King of Hanover (1771–1851), Duke of Cumberland and Teviotdale from 1799, king from 1837
- George V of Hanover (1819–1878)
- Ernest Augustus, Crown Prince of Hanover (1845–1923)
- Ernest Augustus, Duke of Brunswick (1887–1953)
- Ernest Augustus, Prince of Hanover (1914–1987)
- Ernest Augustus, Prince of Hanover (born 1954)

House of Hanover: House of Brunswick-Lüneburg, Hanover line
Key:
: The red border indicates leaders of the House
: The bold black border indicates children of leaders
: The thin black border indicates other relatives

George; 1582–1641; Duke of Brunswick-Calenberg, Prince of Calenberg	Anna Eleonore of Hesse-Darmstadt; 1601–1659
Christian Louis; 1622–1665; Duke of Brunswick-Lüneburg, Prince of Calenberg, Prince of Lüneburg	George William; 1624–1705; Duke of Brunswick-Lüneburg, Prince of Calenberg, Prince of Lüneburg	John Frederick; 1625–1679; Duke of Brunswick-Calenberg, Prince of Calenberg	Sophie Amalie of Brunswick-Calenberg; 1628–1685	Frederick III; 1609–1670; King of Denmark	Ernest Augustus; 1629–1698; Duke of Brunswick-Lüneburg, Elector-designate of Hanover, Prince of Calenberg, Prince-bishop of Osnabrück	Sophia of Hanover; 1630–1714
Sophia Dorothea of Celle; 1666–1726	George I 1660–1727; King of Great Britain, Duke of Brunswick-Lüneburg, Prince of Calenberg, Prince of Lüneburg, Elector of Hanover	Maximilian William of Brunswick-Lüneburg; 1666–1726	Sophia Charlotte; 1668–1705; Queen in Prussia	Charles Philip of Brunswick-Lüneburg; 1669–1690	Christian Henry of Brunswick-Lüneburg; 1671–1703	Ernest Augustus; 1674–1728; Duke of York and Albany, Prince-bishop of Osnabrück
Caroline of Ansbach; 1683–1737	George II; 1683–1760; King of Great Britain, Elector of Hanover	Sophia Dorothea of Hanover; 1687–1757	Frederick William I 1688–1740; King of Prussia
Augusta of Saxe-Gotha; 1719–1772	Frederick; 1707–1751; Prince of Wales	William IV; 1711–1751; Prince of Orange	Anne; 1709–1759; Princess Royal	Amelia Sophia Eleanor; 1711–1786	Caroline Elizabeth; 1713–1757	George William; 1717–1718	William Augustus; 1721–1765; Duke of Cumberland	Mary; 1723–1772	Frederick II; 1720–1785; Landgrave of Hesse-Kassel	Louise; 1724–1751	Frederick V 1723–1766; King of Denmark
Augusta Frederica; 1737–1813	Charles William Ferdinand; 1735–1806; Duke of Brunswick	George III; 1738–1820; King of Great Britain, Duke of Brunswick-Lüneburg, Elector, then King, of Hanover	Charlotte of Mecklenburg-Strelitz; 1744–1818	Frederick William II; 1744–1797; King of Prussia	Edward; 1739–1767; Duke of York and Albany	Elizabeth Caroline; 1741–1759	William Henry; 1743–1805; Duke of Gloucester and Edinburgh	Henry; 1745–1790; Duke of Cumberland and Strathearn	Louisa; 1749–1768	Frederick; 1750–1765	Caroline Matilda; 1751–1775	Christian VII; 1749–1808; King of Denmark
Caroline of Brunswick; 1768–1821	George IV; 1762–1830; King of Great Britain, Duke of Brunswick-Lüneburg, Elector of Hanover (regent 1811–1820)	Frederick; 1763–1827; Duke of York and Albany, Prince-bishop of Osnabrück	Frederica Charlotte; 1767–1820; Princess of Prussia	Adelaide of Saxe-Meiningen; 1792–1849	William IV; 1765–1837; King of Great Britain, Elector of Hanover	Charlotte; 1766–1828; Princess Royal	Frederick I 1754–1816; King of Württemberg	Edward; 1767–1820; Duke of Kent and Strathearn	Victoria; 1786–1861; Princess of Saxe-Coburg-Saalfeld	Augusta Sophia; 1768–1840
Elizabeth; 1770–1840	Frederick VI; 1769–1829; Landgrave of Hesse-Homburg	Ernest Augustus; 1771–1851; Duke of Brunswick-Lüneburg, King of Hanover	Frederica of Mecklenburg-Strelitz; 1778–1841	Augustus Frederick; 1773–1843; Duke of Sussex	Adolphus; 1774–1850; Duke of Cambridge	Augusta; 1797–1889; Princess of Hesse-Kassel	Mary; 1776–1857	William Frederick; 1776–1834; Duke of Gloucester and Edinburgh	Sophia Matilda; 1777–1848	Octavius; 1779–1783	Alfred; 1780–1783	Amelia; 1783–1810
Leopold I 1790–1865; King of the Belgians	Charlotte; 1796–1817; Princess of Wales	George V 1819–1878; Duke of Brunswick-Lüneburg, King of Hanover	Marie of Saxe-Altenburg; 1818–1907	Charlotte; 1819; Princess of Clarence	Elizabeth; 1820–1821; Princess of Clarence	George; 1819–1904; Duke of Cambridge	Augusta; 1822–1916; Princess of Cambridge	Frederick William; 1819–1904; Grand Duke of Mecklenburg-Strelitz	Mary Adelaide; 1833–1897; Princess of Cambridge	Francis; 1837–1900; Duke of Teck	Victoria; 1819–1901; Queen of Great Britain	Albert; 1819–1861; Prince of Saxe-Coburg and Gotha
Thyra; 1853–1933; Princess of Denmark	Ernest Augustus; 1845–1923; Duke of Brunswick-Lüneburg, Crown Prince of Hanover, Duke of Cumberland and Teviotdale	Frederica; 1848–1926; Princess of Hanover	Alphons von Pawel-Rammingen; 1843–1932	Marie; 1849–1904; Princess of Hanover	Wilhelm II; 1859–1941; Emperor of Germany
Maximilian; 1867–1929; Prince of Baden	Marie Louise; 1879–1948; Princess of Hanover	George William Christian Albert Edward Alexander Friedrich Waldemar Ernst Adolf; 1880–1912; Hereditary Prince of Hanover	Alexandra; 1882–1963; Princess of Hanover	Frederick Francis IV; 1882–1945; Grand Duke of Mecklenburg-Schwerin	Olga; 1884–1958; Princess of Hanover	Christian Friedrich Wilhelm Georg Peter Waldemar; 1885–1901; Prince of Hanover	Ernest Augustus; 1887–1953; Duke of Brunswick	Victoria Louise; 1892–1980; Princess of Prussia
Ortrud; 1925–1980; Princess of Schleswig-Holstein-Sonderburg-Glücksburg	Ernest Augustus; 1914–1987; Prince of Hanover	Countess Monika zu Solms-Laubach; 1929–2015	George William; 1915–2006; Prince of Hanover	Sophie; 1914–2001; Princess of Greece and Denmark	Frederica; 1917–1981; Princess of Hanover	Paul; 1901–1964; King of Greece	Christian Oscar Ernst August Wilhelm Viktor Georg Heinrich; 1919–1981; Prince of Hanover	Mireille Dutry b. 1946	Welf Heinrich Ernst August Georg Christian Berthold Friedrich Wilhelm Louis Ferdinand; 1923–1997; Prince of Hanover	Alexandra; 1937–2015; Princess of Ysenburg and Büdingen
Count Michael von Hochberg	Marie b. 1952; Princess of Hanover	Chantal Hochuli	Ernst August b. 1954; Prince of Hanover	Caroline b. 1957; Princess of Monaco	Ludwig Rudolph; 1955–1988; Prince of Hanover	Isabella von Thurn und Valsássina-Como-Vercelli; 1962–1988	Olga Sophie Charlotte Anna b. 1958; Princess of Hanover	Alexandra b. 1959; Princess of Hanover	Andreas; 8th Prince of Leiningen	Heinrich b. 1961; Prince of Hanover	Thyra von Westernhagen
Ekaterina Igorievna Malysheva b. 1986	Ernst August b. 1983; Prince of Hanover	Christian b. 1985; Prince of Hanover	Alexandra b. 1999; Princess of Hanover

=== Complete male-line family tree ===
List of male-line members of the House of Welf

Male, male-line, legitimate, non-morganatic members of the house who either lived to adulthood, or who held a title as a child, are included. Heads of the house are in bold.

- **Adalberto the Margrave, d. c. 951**
  - **Oberto I, c. 910–975**
    - **Adalbert II of Milan**
    - **Oberto II, Margrave of Milan, c. 940–1014**
      - **Hugh, Margrave of Milan**
      - **Albert Azzo I, Margrave of Milan, 970–1029**
        - **Albert Azzo II, Margrave of Milan, 997–1097**
          - **Welf I, Duke of Bavaria, c. 1035–1101**
            - **Welf II, Duke of Bavaria, 1072–1120**
            - **Henry IX, Duke of Bavaria, 1075–1126**
              - Conrad of Bavaria, 1105–1126
              - **Henry the Proud, 1108–1139**
                - **Henry the Lion, 1130–1195**
                  - **Henry V, Count Palatine of the Rhine, 1173–1227**
                    - Henry VI, Count Palatine of the Rhine, 1196–1214
                  - Otto IV, Holy Roman Emperor, 1175–1218
                  - William of Winchester, Lord of Lunenburg, 1184–1213
                    - **Otto I, Duke of Brunswick-Lüneburg, 1204–1252**
                      - **Albert I, Duke of Brunswick, 1236–1279**
                        - **Henry I, Duke of Brunswick-Grubenhagen, 1267–1322**
                          - Otto, 1283–1309
                          - Albert, Teutonic Knight, 1284–1341
                          - **Henry II, Duke of Brunswick-Grubenhagen, 1296–1351**
                            - **Otto, Duke of Brunswick-Grubenhagen, 1320–1398**
                            - John, canon of Halberstadt, 1321–1346
                            - Louis, canon of Cammin, 1323–1373
                            - Philip of Brunswick-Grubenhagen, Constable of Jerusalem, 1332–1370
                              - John of Brunswick-Grubenhagen, Admiral of Cyprus, d. 1414
                            - Riddag, 1334–1367
                            - Balthazar, Despot of Romania, 1336–1384
                            - Thomas, 1338–1384
                            - Melchior, Bishop of Osnabrück and Schwerin, 1341–1381
                          - Frederick, c. 1291–1323
                          - Conrad, c. 1294–1320
                          - Ernest I, Duke of Brunswick-Grubenhagen, 1297–1361
                            - Albert I, Duke of Brunswick-Grubenhagen, 1339–1383
                              - **Eric I, Duke of Brunswick-Grubenhagen, 1383–1427**
                                - **Henry III, Duke of Brunswick-Grubenhagen, 1416–1464**
                                  - **Henry IV, Duke of Brunswick-Grubenhagen, 1460–1526**
                                - Ernest II, Duke of Brunswick-Grubenhagen, 1418–1466
                                - Albert II, Duke of Brunswick-Grubenhagen, 1419–1485
                                  - **Philip I, Duke of Brunswick-Grubenhagen, 1476–1551**
                                    - **Ernest III, Duke of Brunswick-Grubenhagen, 1518–1567**
                                    - Albert, 1521–1546
                                    - John, 1526–1557
                                    - **Wolfgang, Duke of Brunswick-Grubenhagen, 1531–1595**
                                    - **Philip II, Duke of Brunswick-Grubenhagen, 1533–1596**
                                  - Eric of Brunswick-Grubenhagen, Bishop of Paderborn and Osnabrück, 1478–1532
                                  - Ernest, d. 1486
                            - Ernest II, abbot of Corvey, c. 1346–1401
                            - Frederick I, Duke of Brunswick-Osterode, 1350–1421
                              - Otto II, Duke of Brunswick-Osterode, 1396–1452
                          - William, Duke of Brunswick-Grubenhagen, 1298–1360
                          - John I, Duke of Brunswick-Grubenhagen, c. 1300–1367
                        - Albert II "the Fat", Duke of Brunswick, 1268–1318
                          - Otto "the Mild", Duke of Brunswick, 1292–1344
                          - Lothar, Teutonic Knight
                          - Albert II of Brunswick-Lüneburg, Bishop of Halberstadt, 1294–1358
                          - Henry III of Brunswick-Lüneburg, Bishop of Hildesheim, 1296–1363
                          - Magnus I "the Pious", Duke of Brunswick-Lüneburg, 1304–1369
                            - Magnus II "with the Necklace", Duke of Brunswick-Lüneburg, 1324–1373
                              - Frederick I, Duke of Brunswick-Wolfenbüttel, 1357–1400
                              - Bernard I, Duke of Brunswick, 1361–1434
                                - Otto IV "the Lame", Duke of Brunswick-Lüneburg, d. 1446
                                - Frederick II "the Pious", Duke of Brunswick, 1418–1478
                                  - Bernard II, Duke of Brunswick-Lüneburg, 1437–1464
                                  - Otto V "the Victorious", Duke of Brunswick, 1439–1471
                                    - Henry I "the Middle", Duke of Brunswick, 1468–1532
                                      - Otto I, Duke of Brunswick-Harburg, 1495–1549
                                        - **Otto II, Duke of Brunswick-Harburg, 1528–1603**
                                          - Duke Otto Henry of Brunswick-Harburg, 1555–1591
                                          - John Frederick, 1557–1619
                                          - **William Augustus, Duke of Brunswick-Harburg, 1564–1642**
                                          - Enno, 1565–1600
                                          - Christopher, Duke of Brunswick-Harburg, 1570–1606
                                          - Otto III, Duke of Brunswick-Harburg, 1572–1641
                                          - John, 1573–1625
                                          - Frederick, 1578–1605
                                      - Ernest I "the Confessor", Duke of Brunswick, 1497–1546
                                        - Francis Otto, Duke of Brunswick-Lüneburg, 1530–1559
                                        - Frederick, 1532–1553
                                        - Henry, Duke of Brunswick-Dannenberg, 1533–1598
                                          - Julius Ernest, Duke of Brunswick-Dannenberg, 1571–1636
                                          - Francis, Provost of Strasbourg, 1572–1601
                                          - **Augustus II "the Younger", Duke of Brunswick, 1579–1666**
                                            - **Rudolph Augustus, Duke of Brunswick-Wolfenbüttel, 1627–1704**
                                            - **Anthony Ulrich, Duke of Brunswick, 1633–1714**
                                              - Augustus Frederick, 1657–1676
                                              - **Augustus William, Duke of Brunswick-Wolfenbüttel, 1662–1731**
                                              - **Louis Rudolph, Duke of Brunswick, 1671–1735**
                                            - Ferdinand Albert I, Duke of Brunswick-Wolfenbüttel-Bevern, 1636–1687
                                              - Augustus Ferdinand, 1677–1704
                                              - Ferdinand Albert II, Duke of Brunswick-Wolfenbüttel, 1680–1735
                                                - **Charles I, Duke of Brunswick-Wolfenbüttel, 1713–1780**
                                                  - **Charles William Ferdinand, Duke of Brunswick, 1735–1806**
                                                    - Charles George Augustus, Hereditary Prince of Brunswick-Wolfenbüttel, 1766–1806
                                                    - George William Christian, 1769–1811
                                                    - Augustus, 1770–1822
                                                    - **Frederick William, Duke of Brunswick-Wolfenbüttel, 1771–1815**
                                                      - **Charles II, Duke of Brunswick, 1804–1873**
                                                      - **William, Duke of Brunswick, 1806–1884**
                                                  - Frederick Augustus, Prince of Brunswick-Wolfenbüttel-Oels, 1740–1805
                                                  - Albert Henry, 1742–1761
                                                  - William Adolf, 1745–1770
                                                  - Leopold of Brunswick-Wolfenbüttel, 1752–1785
                                                - Duke Anthony Ulrich of Brunswick, 1714–1774
                                                  - Ivan VI of Russia, 1740–1764
                                                  - Peter Antonovich of Brunswick, 1745–1798
                                                  - Alexei Antonovich of Brunswick, 1746–1787
                                                - Duke Louis Ernest of Brunswick-Lüneburg, 1718–1788
                                                - Duke Ferdinand of Brunswick-Wolfenbüttel, 1721–1792
                                                - Albert of Brunswick-Wolfenbüttel, 1725–1745
                                                - Frederick Francis of Brunswick-Wolfenbüttel, 1732–1758
                                              - Ferdinand Christian, 1682–1706
                                              - Ernest Ferdinand, Duke of Brunswick-Wolfenbüttel-Bevern, 1682–1746
                                                - Augustus William, Duke of Brunswick-Wolfenbüttel-Bevern, 1715–1781
                                                - George Louis, 1721–1747
                                                - George Frederick, 1723–1766
                                                - Frederick Charles Ferdinand, Duke of Brunswick-Wolfenbüttel-Bevern, 1729–1809
                                              - Henry Ferdinand, 1684–1706
                                        - William the Younger, Duke of Brunswick, 1535–1592
                                          - Ernest II, Duke of Brunswick-Lüneburg, 1564–1611
                                          - Christian, Duke of Brunswick-Lüneburg, 1566–1633
                                          - Augustus the Elder, Duke of Brunswick-Lüneburg, 1568–1636
                                          - Frederick IV, Duke of Brunswick-Lüneburg, 1574–1648
                                          - Magnus of Brunswick-Lüneburg, 1577–1632
                                          - George, Duke of Brunswick, 1582–1641
                                            - Christian Louis, Duke of Brunswick-Lüneburg, 1622–1665
                                            - George William, Duke of Brunswick, 1624–1705
                                            - John Frederick, Duke of Brunswick, 1625–1679
                                            - Ernest Augustus, Elector of Hanover, 1629–1698
                                              - George I of Great Britain, 1660–1727
                                                - George II of Great Britain, 1683–1760
                                                  - Frederick, Prince of Wales, 1707–1751
                                                    - George III, 1738–1820
                                                      - George IV, 1762–1830
                                                      - Prince Frederick, Duke of York and Albany, 1763–1827
                                                      - William IV, 1765–1837
                                                      - Prince Edward, Duke of Kent and Strathearn, 1767–1820
                                                      - Ernest Augustus, King of Hanover, 1771–1851
                                                        - George V of Hanover, 1819–1878
                                                          - **Ernest Augustus, Crown Prince of Hanover, 1845–1923**
                                                            - George William, Hereditary Prince of Hanover, 1880–1912
                                                            - **Ernest Augustus, Duke of Brunswick, 1887–1953**
                                                              - **Prince Ernest Augustus of Hanover, 1914–1987**
                                                                - **Ernest Augustus of Hanover, b. 1954**
                                                                  - Ernest Augustus of Hanover, b. 1983
                                                                    - Welf Augustus von Hannover, b. 2019
                                                                  - Prince Christian of Hanover, b. 1985
                                                                    - 3 children
                                                                - Prince Louis Rudolph of Hanover, 1955–1988
                                                                  - Prince Otto Henry of Hanover, b. 1988
                                                                - Prince Henry of Hanover, b. 1961
                                                                  - Oscar Nick, b. 1996
                                                                  - Albert, b. 1999
                                                                  - Julius, b. 2006
                                                              - Prince George William of Hanover, 1915–2006
                                                                - Prince Welf, 1947–1981, issue?
                                                                - Prince George, b. 1949, issue?
                                                              - Prince Christian, 1919–1981
                                                              - Prince Guelph, 1923–1997
                                                      - Prince Augustus Frederick, Duke of Sussex, 1773–1843
                                                      - Prince Adolphus, Duke of Cambridge, 1774–1850
                                                        - Prince George, Duke of Cambridge, 1819–1904
                                                    - Prince Edward, Duke of York and Albany, 1739–1767
                                                    - Prince William Henry, Duke of Gloucester and Edinburgh, 1743–1805
                                                      - Prince William Frederick, Duke of Gloucester and Edinburgh, 1776–1834
                                                    - Prince Henry, Duke of Cumberland and Strathearn, 1745–1790
                                                  - Prince William, Duke of Cumberland, 1721–1765
                                              - Frederick Augustus, 1661–1691
                                              - Maximilian William of Brunswick-Lüneburg, 1666–1726
                                              - Charles Philip, 1669–1690
                                              - Christian Henry, 1671–1703
                                              - Ernest Augustus, Duke of York and Albany, 1674–1728
                                          - John of Brunswick-Lüneburg, 1583–1628
                                      - Francis, Duke of Brunswick-Lüneburg, 1508–1549
                                  - Godfrey, 1441–1465
                              - Otto, Archbishop of Bremen, 1364–1406
                              - Henry the Mild, Duke of Brunswick-Lüneburg, d. 1416
                                - William the Victorious, Duke of Brunswick-Lüneburg, 1392–1482
                                  - Frederick III "the Turbulent", Duke of Brunswick-Lüneburg, 1424–1495
                                  - William IV "the Younger", Duke of Brunswick-Lüneburg, 1425–1503
                                    - Henry IV "the Elder", Duke of Brunswick-Lüneburg, 1463–1514
                                      - Christopher of Brunswick-Wolfenbüttel, Archbishop of Bremen, 1487–1558
                                      - Henry V "the Younger", Duke of Brunswick-Lüneburg, 1489–1568
                                        - Charles Victor, 1525–1553
                                        - Philip, 1527–1553
                                        - Julius, Duke of Brunswick-Lüneburg, 1528–1589
                                          - Henry Julius, Duke of Brunswick-Lüneburg, 1564–1613
                                            - Frederick Ulrich, Duke of Brunswick-Lüneburg, 1591–1634
                                            - Christian the Younger of Brunswick, 1599–1626
                                          - Philip Sigismund of Brunswick-Wolfenbüttel, 1568–1623
                                          - Joachim Charles, Provost of Strasbourg, 1573–1615
                                          - Julius Augustus, Abbot of Michaelstein, 1578–1617
                                      - Francis of Brunswick-Wolfenbüttel, Bishop of Minden, 1492–1529
                                      - George of Brunswick-Wolfenbüttel, Archbishop of Bremen, 1494–1566
                                      - Eric of Brunswick-Wolfenbüttel, Teutonic Knight, 1500–1553
                                      - William of Brunswick-Wolfenbüttel, Teutonic Knight, d. 1557
                                    - Eric I "the Elder", Duke of Brunswick-Lüneburg, 1470–1540
                                      - Eric II, Duke of Brunswick-Lüneburg, 1528–1584
                                - Henry the Peaceful, Duke of Brunswick-Lüneburg, 1411–1473
                            - Louis, d. 1367
                            - Albert II, Prince-Archbishop of Bremen, d. 1395
                            - Henry, provost of Halberstadt
                            - Ernest
                          - Ernest I, Duke of Brunswick-Göttingen, 1305–1367
                            - Otto I "the Evil", Duke of Brunswick-Göttingen, 1340–1394
                              - Otto II "the One-Eyed", Duke of Brunswick-Göttingen, 1380–1463
                            - other son, clergyman
                        - William I, Duke of Brunswick-Lüneburg, 1270–1292
                        - Otto, d. c. 1346
                        - Lothar of Brunswick, 1275–1335
                        - Conrad, d. c. 1303
                      - John, Duke of Brunswick-Lüneburg, 1242–1277
                        - Otto II "the Strict", Duke of Brunswick-Lüneburg, 1266–1330
                          - John, d. 1324
                          - Otto III, Duke of Brunswick-Lüneburg, 1296–1352
                          - Louis, Bishop of Minden, d. 1346
                          - William II, Duke of Brunswick-Lüneburg, 1300–1369
                      - Otto, Bishop of Hildesheim, d. 1279
                      - Conrad of Brunswick and Lunenburg, Prince-Bishop of Verden, d. 1300
              - Welf VI, 1115–1191
                - Welf VII, 1135–1167
              - Adalbert, Abbot of Corvey
          - Fulco I, Margrave of Milan, c. 1070–1134
            - Azzo IV d'Este (d. before 1145)
            - Bonifacio I d'Este (d. 1163)
            - Fulco II d'Este (d. before 1172)
            - Alberto (d. after 1184)
            - Obizzo I d'Este (d. 1193)
              - Azzo V of Este, d. 1190
                - Azzo VI d'Este, 1170–1212
                  - Aldobrandino I d'Este, 1190–1215
                    - Contardo of Este, 1216–1249
                  - Azzo VII d'Este, 1205–1264
                    - Rinaldo d'Este, 1221–1251
                      - Obizzo II d'Este, 1247–1293, legitimised 1252
                        - Azzo VIII d'Este, d. 1308
                        - Hildebrand II of Este, Marquis of Ferrara, d. 1326
                          - Obert III of Este, Marquis of Ferrara, 1294–1352
                            - Hildebrand III of Este, Marquis of Ferrara, 1335–1361
                            - Nicholas II of Este, Marquis of Ferrara, 1338–1388
                            - Albert V of Este, Marquis of Ferrara, 1347–1393
                              - Nicholas III of Este, Marquis of Ferrara, 1383–1441, legitimised
                                - Hercules I of Este, Duke of Ferrara, 1431–1505
                                  - Alphonse I of Este, Duke of Ferrara, 1476–1534
                                    - Hercules II of Este, Duke of Ferrara, 1508–1559
                                      - Alphonse II of Este, Duke of Ferrara, 1533–1597
                                      - Louis of Este, Bishop of Ferrara, 1538–1586
                                    - Hippolyte II of Este, Archbishop of Milan, 1509–1572
                                    - Francis of Este, Marquis of Massalombarda, 1516–1578
                                    - Alphonse of Este, Marquis of Montecchio, 1527–1597, legitimised 1532
                                      - Alphonse of Este, 1560–1578
                                      - Caesar of Este, Duke of Modena and Reggio, 1562–1628
                                        - Alphonse III of Este, Duke of Modena and Reggio, 1591–1644
                                          - Francis I of Este, Duke of Modena and Reggio, 1610–1658
                                            - Alphonse IV of Este, Duke of Modena and Reggio, 1634–1662
                                              - Francis II of Este, Duke of Modena and Reggio, 1660–1694
                                            - Almeric d'Este, 1641–1660
                                            - Reynold of Este, Duke of Modena and Reggio, 1655–1737
                                              - Francis III of Este, Duke of Modena and Reggio, 1698–1780
                                                - Hercules III of Este, Duke of Modena and Reggio, 1727–1803
                                              - John Frederick of Este, 1700–1727
                                          - Obizzo d'Este, Bishop of Modena, 1611–1644
                                          - Caesar d'Este, 1614–1677
                                          - Charles Alexander d'Este, 1616–1679
                                          - Reynold d'Este, cardinal, 1618–1672
                                          - Philibert d'Este, 1623–1645
                                        - Louis of Este, Lord of Montecchio and Scandiano, 1594–1664
                                        - Hippolyte d'Este, 1599–1647
                                        - Nicholas d'Este, 1601–1640
                                        - Borso d'Este, 1605–1657
                                          - Louis d'Este, Lord of Scandiano, 1648–1698
                                          - Foresto Francis d'Este, Lord of Montecchio, 1652–1725
                                          - Caesar Ignatius d'Este, Lord of Montecchio, 1653–1713
                                        - Foresto d'Este, 1606–1639
                                      - Alexander of Este, 1568–1624, cardinal
                                  - Ferdinand of Este, 1477–1540
                                  - Hippolyte of Este, Archbishop of Esztergom, 1479–1520
                                  - Sigismund of Este, 1480–1524
                                - Sigismund of Este, 1433–1507
                          - Rinaldo
                          - Niccolò
                        - Francesco
          - Hugh V, Count of Maine, c. 1060–1131
      - Guido
      - Otbert III, Margrave of East Liguria
- Ambrose (d. 988), bishop of Aléria in Corsica

== Summary Armorial ==
Previous versions
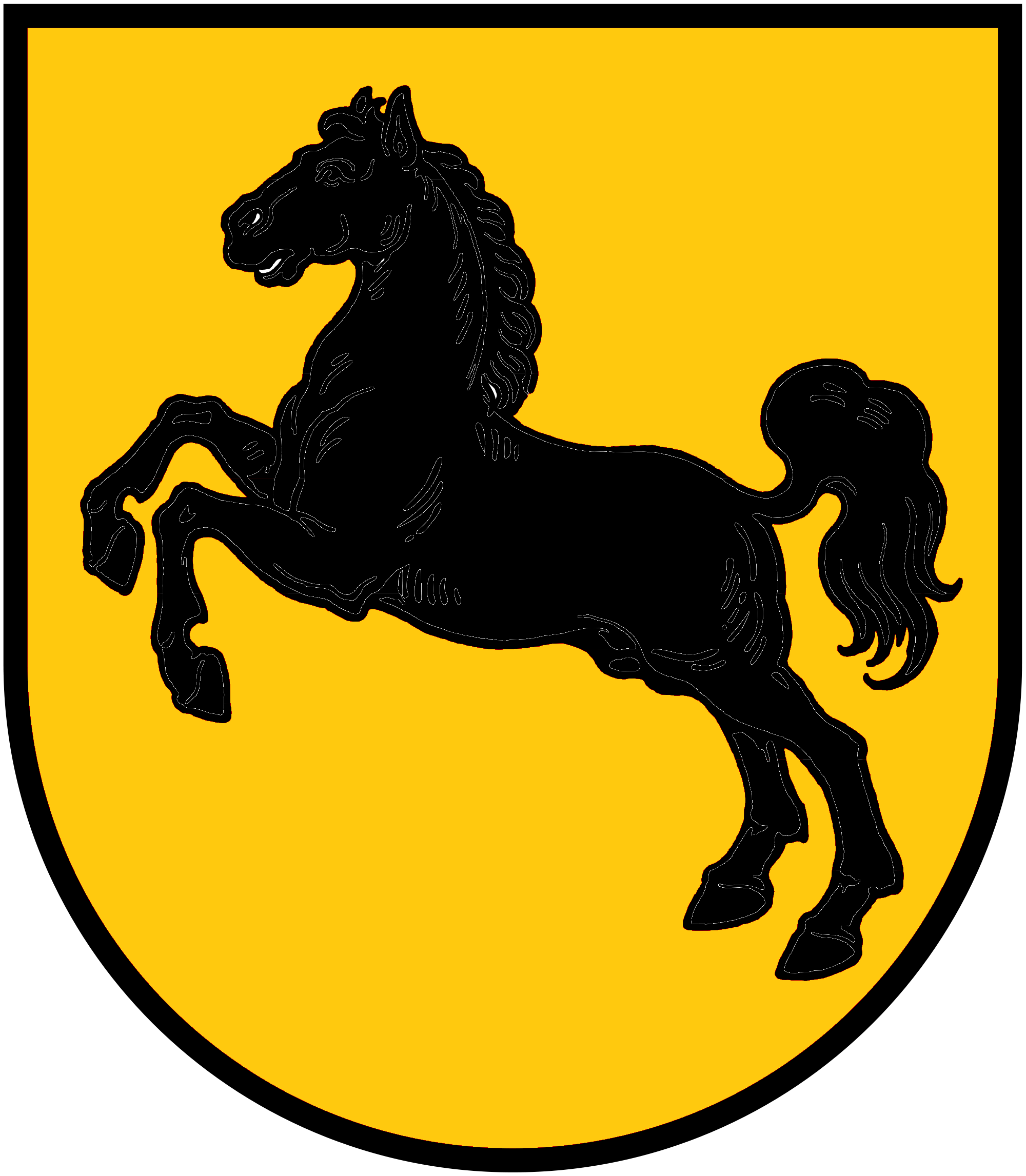
Black Saxon Steed, according to legend Duke Widukind's ensign for Old Saxony (700–785)

Widukind's White Steed as ensign of the Duchy of Saxony, claimed by the House of Welf from 1361, adopted by the Electorate of Hanover

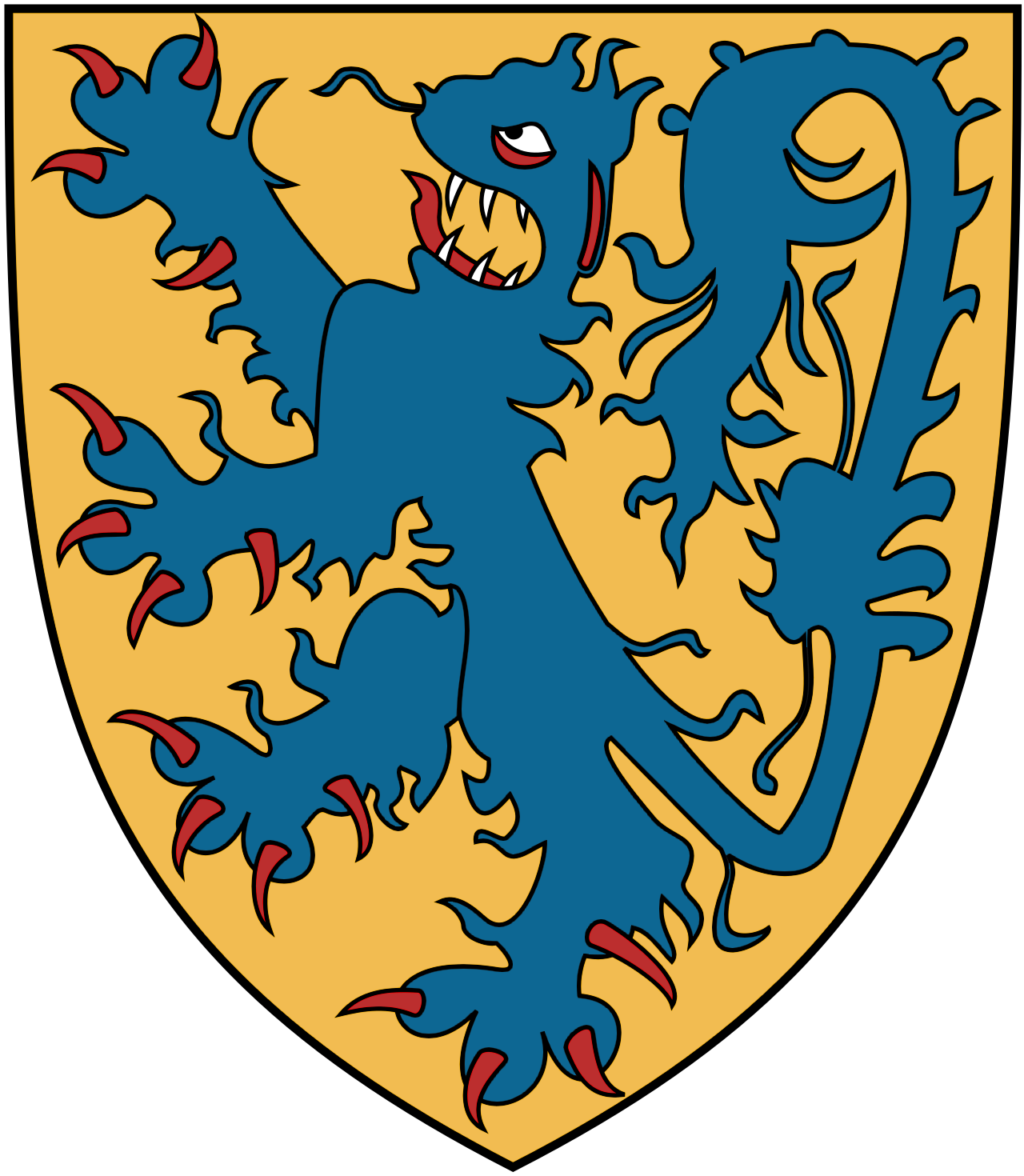
Arms of Henry the Lion (attributed?)

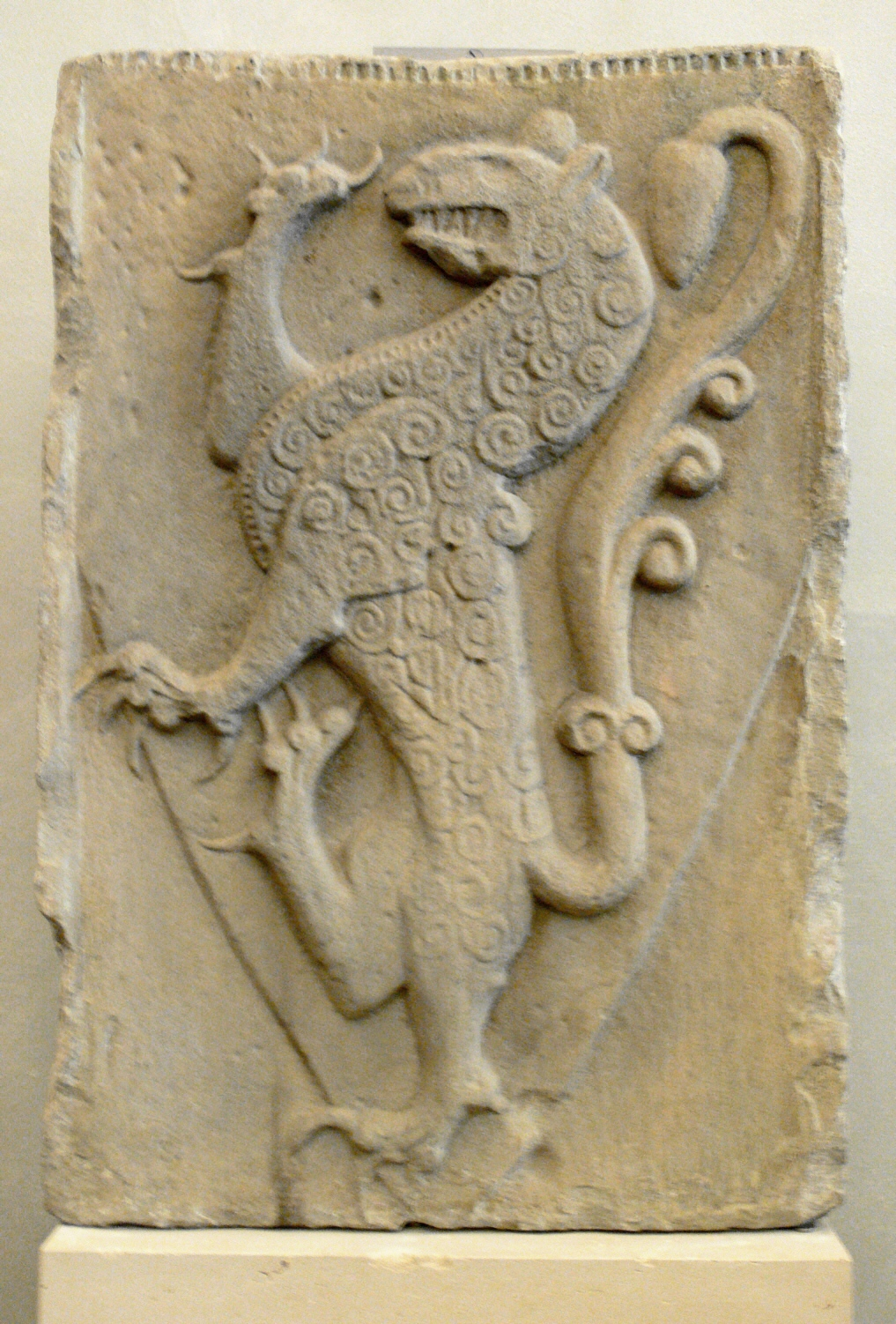
Coat of Arms of the Guelphs; Bavaria c. 1200 (margins probably late 13th century); sandstone; from Steingaden Abbey

Coat of arms of the House of Welf-Brunswick (Braunschweig), probably based on their English cousin's arms.

Coat of arms of the principality of Lüneburg, possibly based on their in-laws the Danish Royal House and Henry the Lion.

Coat of Arms of Brunswick-Lüneburg

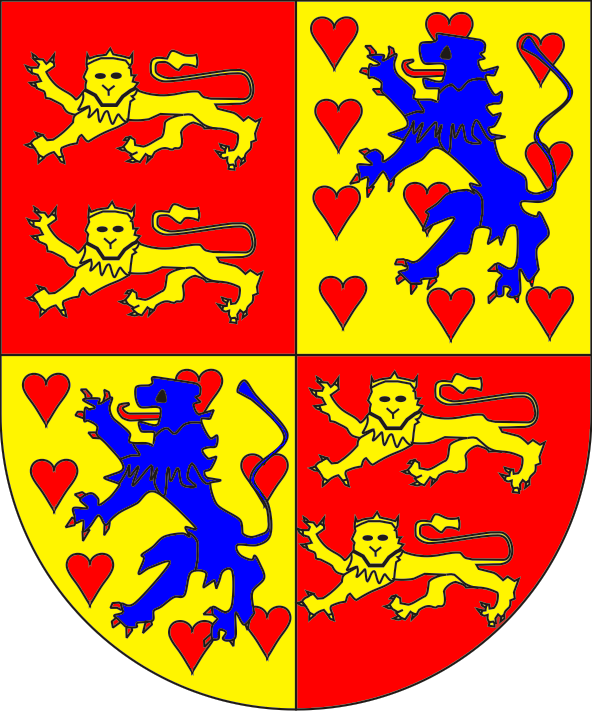
Brunswick-Luneburg 1250, 1367

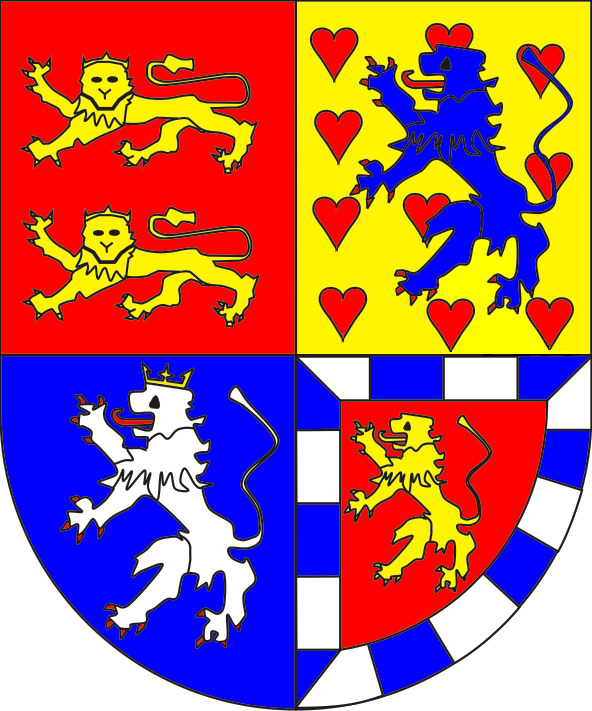
Brunswick-Luneburg 1482, coat of arms of the duchy of Brunswick-Lüneburg (1482–1582); (Note: 1: duchy of Brunswick; 2: duchy of Lüneburg; 3: county of Eberstein; 4: lordship of Homburg)

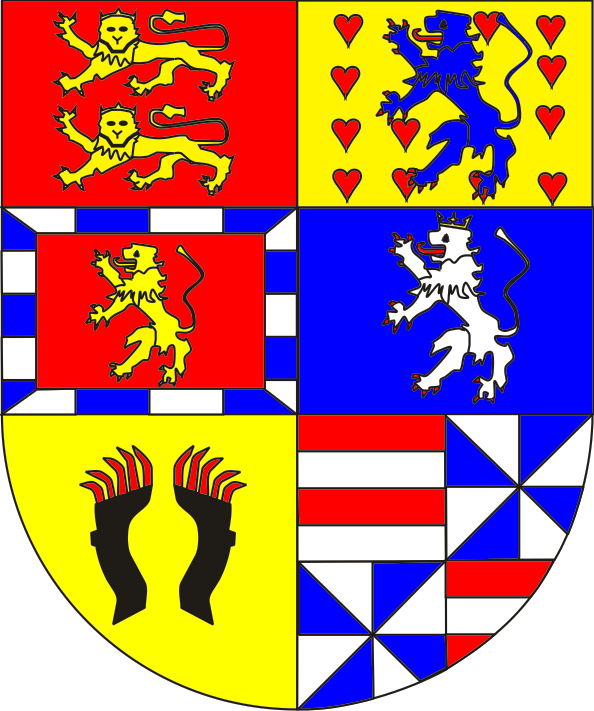
Coat of arms of the duchy of Brunswick-Wolfenbüttel (1582–1596); Brunswick-Lüneburg (1582–1624); Brunswick-Harburg (1582–1624); (Note: 1: duchy of Brunswick; 2: duchy of Lüneburg; 3: lordship of Homburg; 4: county of Eberstein; 5: county of Hoya; 6a/d: lordship of Neu-Bruchhausen; 6b/c: lordship of Alt-Bruchhausen<)

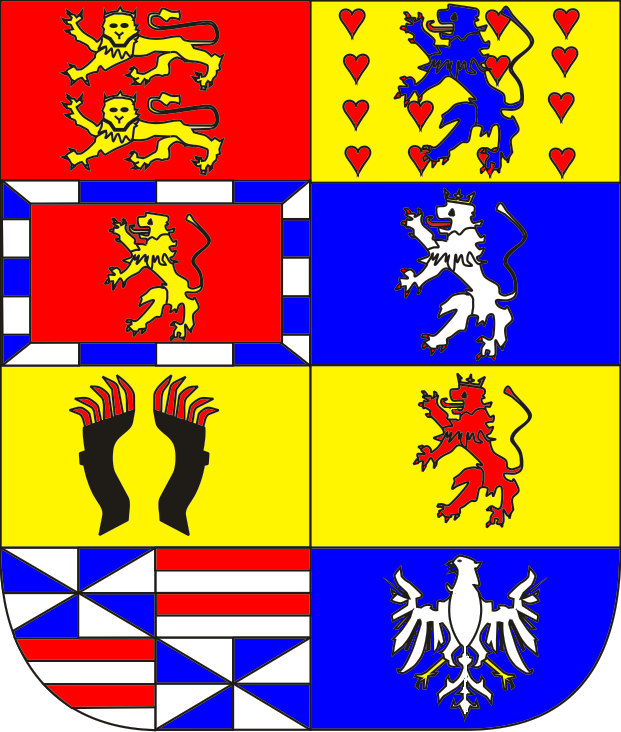
Coat of arms of the duchy of Brunswick-Lüneburg (1585); (Note: 1: duchy of Brunswick; 2: duchy of Lüneburg; 3: lordship of Homburg; 4: county of Eberstein; 5: county of Hoya (1); 6: county of Diepholz (1); 7: county of Hoya (2)[a,d: lordship of Alt-Bruchhausen; b,c: lordship of Neu-Bruchhausen]; 8: county of Diepholz(2))

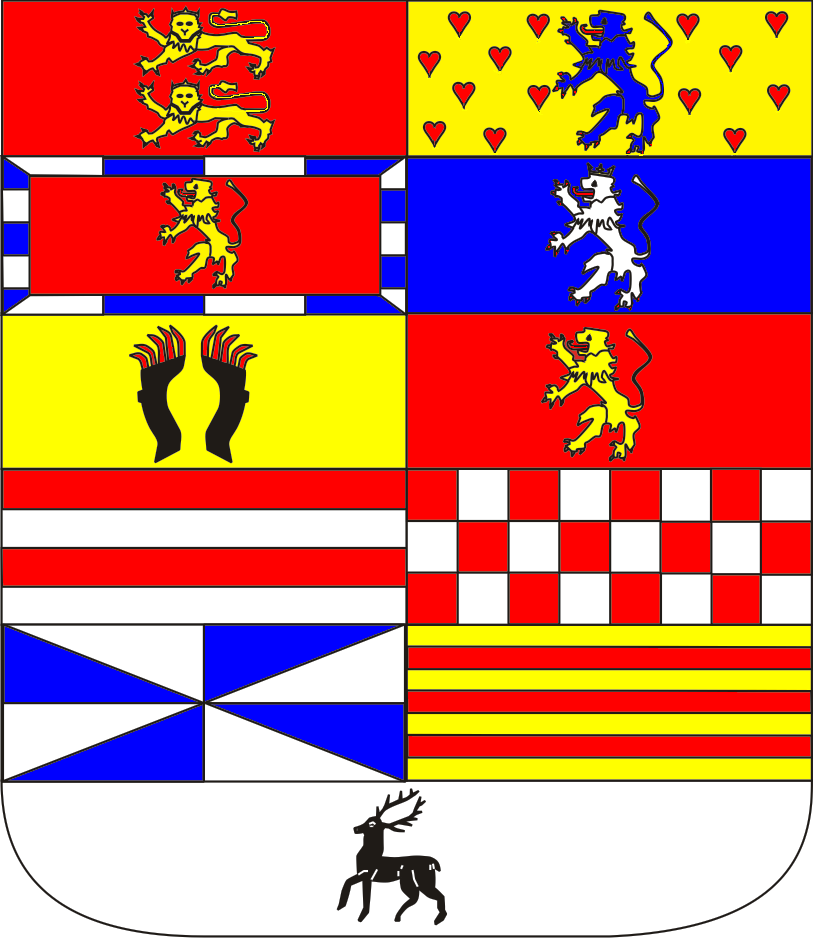
Coat of arms of the duchy of Brunswick-Lüneburg (1596–1599); (Note: 1: duchy of Brunswick; 2: duchy of Lüneburg; 3: lordship of Homburg; 4: county of Eberstein; 5: county of Hoya; 6: county of Lauterberg(1); 7: lordship of Neu-Bruchhausen; 8: county of Hohenstein; 9: lordship of Alt-Bruchhausen; 10: county of Lauterberg(2); 11: lordship of Klettenberg)

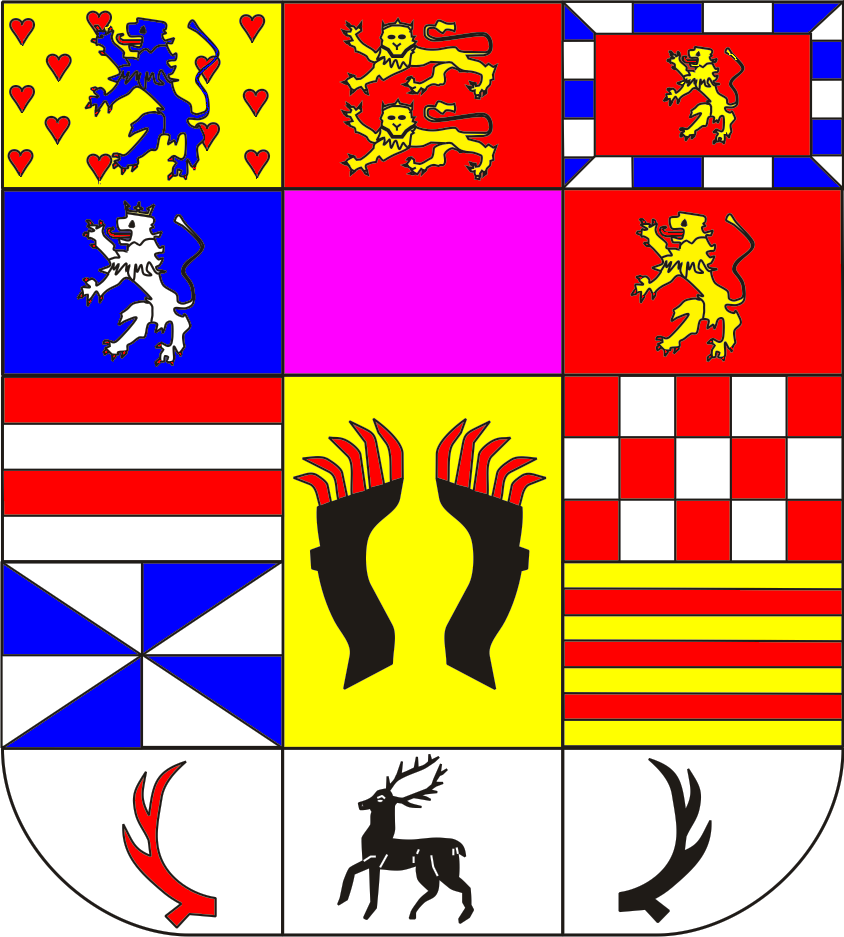
Coat of arms of the duchy of Brunswick-Lüneburg (1599–1613); (Note: 1: duchy of Lüneburg; 2: duchy of Brunswick; 3: lordship of Homburg; 4: county of Eberstein; 5: reservation?; 6: county of Lauterburg(1); 7: lordship of Neu-Bruchhausen; 8: county of Hoya; 9: county of Hohenstein; 10: lordship of Alt-Bruchhausen; 12: count of Lauterberg(2); 13: county of Regenstein; 14: county of Klettenberg; 15: county of Blankenburg.)

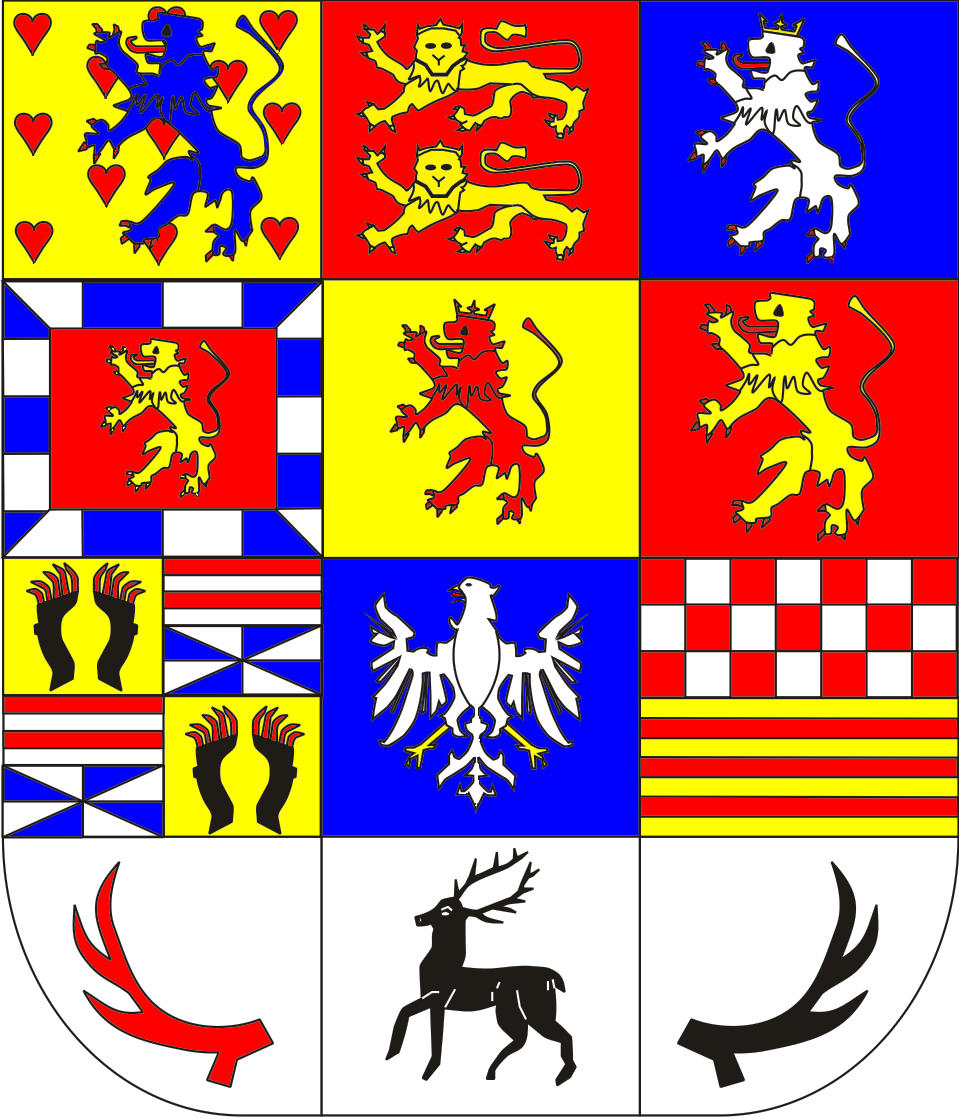
Coat of arms of the duchy of Brunswick (-Wolfenbüttel) (1634–1918); coat of arms of the electorate of Brunswick-Lüneburg; (Note: 1: duchy of Lüneburg; 2: duchy of Brunswick; 3: county of Eberstein; 4: lordship of Homburg; 5: county of Diepholz (1); 6: county of Lauterberg(1); 7a/d: county of Hoya; 7bc1: lordship of Alt-Bruchhausen; 7b/c2: lordship of Neu-Bruchhausen; 8: county of Diepholz(2); 9a: county of Hohenstein; 9b: county of Lauterberg(2); 10: county of Regenstein; 11; county of Klettenberg; 12: county of Blankenburg.)

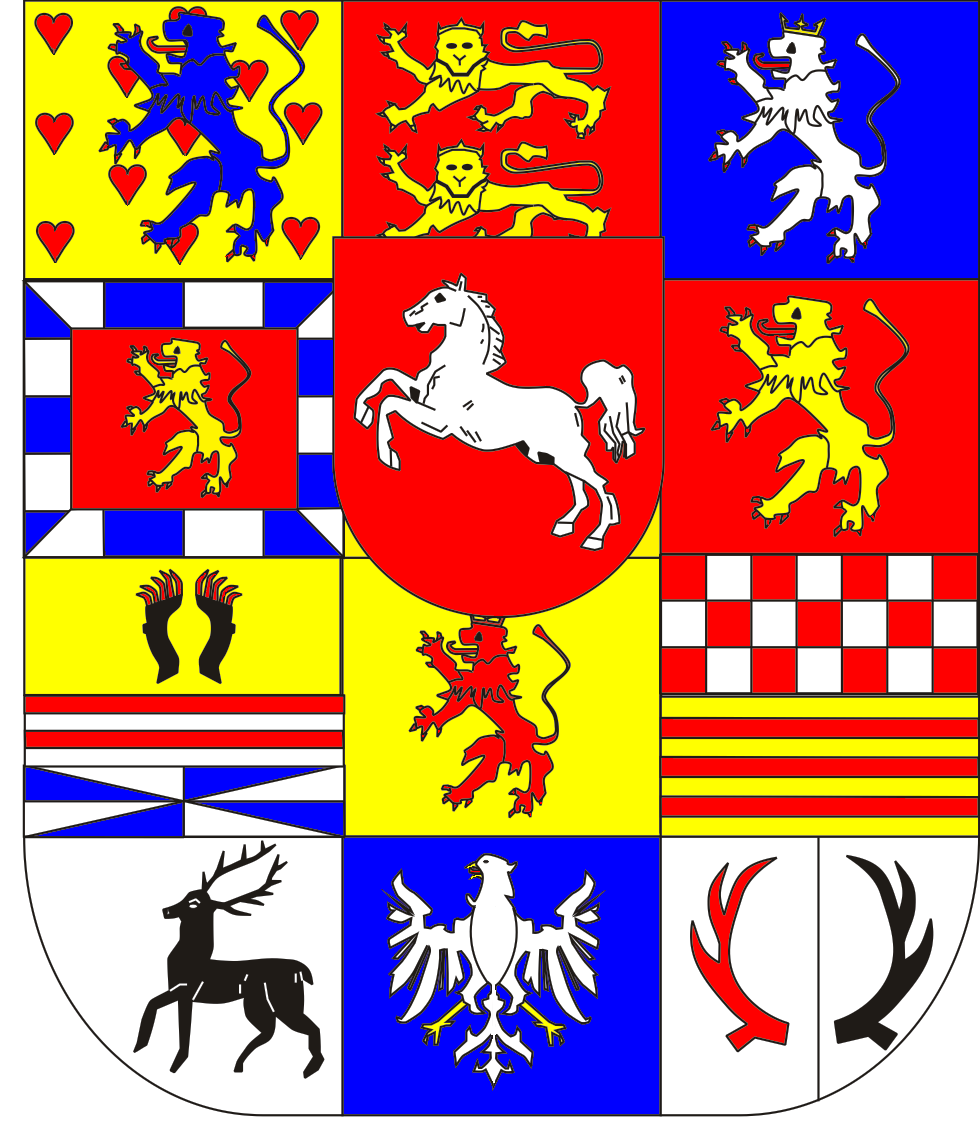
Coat of arms of the electorate of Brunswick-Lüneburg; (Note: 1: duchy of Lüneburg; 2: duchy of Brunswick; 3: county of Eberstein; 4: lordship of Homburg; 6: county of Lauterberg(1); 7a: county of Hoya; 7b: lordship of Alt-Bruchhausen; 7b2: lordship of Neu-Bruchhausen; 8: county of Diepholz(1); 9a: county of Hohenstein; 9b: county of Lauterberg(2); 10: county of Klettenberg; 11: county of Diepholz(2); 12a: county of Regenstein; 12b: county of Bankenburg; heart: duchy of Saxonia (Westphalia))

Coat of Arms of Ernest Augustus (1692–1698) & George I Louis, Electors-designate of Hanover (1698–1708) until approved by the Imperial Diet in 1708, hence the blank red electorial shield. (Note: Ecartelé, I: de gueules, à deux léopards d'or (Welf); II: de gueules, au cheval cabré d'argent, harnaché d'or (Saxe ancien our Westphalie) III: d'or, semé de cœurs de gueules, au lion d'azur (Lunebourg), IV: d'azure au lion couronné d'argent (Comté d'Eberstein), V: le cinquiéme vuide pour fair place à l'écu sur le tout, VI: de gueules au lion d'or, à la borure componnée d'argent et d'azure (Comté de Hombourg), VII: d'azure au lion d'argent; et au dessours pour VIII'eme quartier, d'argent à l'aigle éployé d'azure (Comté de Deipholt), IX: vuide pour fair place à l'écu sur le tout, X:de gueules au lion d'or; et au dessous, XI: d'or à trois fasces de gueules (Comté de Latuerberg), XII: en revenant au flanc dextre, d'argent au cerf de sable (Comté de Clettemberg), XIII: sous l'écu sur le tout, d'argent, à deux pattes d'ours adoffées, mises en pal; coupé, fascé de gueules et d'argent; recoupé, gironné d'argent et d'azur (Comtés de Hoga et de Bruchussen), XIV: échiqueté d'argent et de gules (Comté de Honstein), la pointe de l'écu, d'argent à une perche de boid de cerf de gueules, chevillée de quatre cors, posée en fasce, parti d'argent à la perche de boid de cerf de sable, chevillée de quatre cors, posée en fasce (Comtés de Reinstein et de Blanenbourg).)

Coat of Arms of George I Louis, Elector of Hanover (1708–1714) (same as his father's but with the electorial shield now filled)

Coat of arms of the HRE Arch-Treasurer

Royal Hanover Inescutcheon in Great Britain and the United Kingdom

Royal Arms of the Kingdom of Hanover

Coat of Arms of the Kingdom of Hanover (1814–1866)

Duchy of Brunswick (Note: Shield of the Duchy of Brunswick. Quarterly of 12: 1: Duchy of Lüneburg (Or semée of hearts gules, a lion rampant azure armed and langued of the second. The coat of arms of Lüneburg consisted of a blue lion on a gold field, which was sprinkled with red hearts. It was derived from the coat of arms of Denmark: the mother of Otto I, 1st Duke of Brunswick-Lüneburg was Princess Helena of Denmark. (Source: https://www.wikipe.wiki/wiki/nl/Wapens_van_Brunswijk_en_Lueneburg); 2: Duchy of Brunswick/Braunschweig (Gules, two lions passant guardant in pale or); In 1235 Otto I was elevated to Duke of Brunswick and Lüneburg by the Emperor. He was the only son of w:William of Winchester, Lord of Lunenburg, born in Winchester, England, the fifth and youngest son of the deposed Duke Henry the Lion of Saxony and Bavaria by his wife Matilda, the eldest daughter of King Henry II of England. Otto's royal lineage was accentuated by the arms designed for Brunswick and Lüneburg. The coat of arms of Brunswick consisted of two golden leopards in a red field and was derived from the coat of arms of England because of the marriage of Henry the Lion to Mathilde of England. (Source: https://www.wikipe.wiki/wiki/nl/Wapens_van_Brunswijk_en_Lueneburg); 3: County of Eberstein/Everstein (Azure, a lion rampant argent armed and langued gules crowned or); w:de:Everstein (Adelsgeschlecht); In 1425 w:Otto IV, Duke of Brunswick-Lüneburg (d.1446) (son of w:Bernard I, Duke of Brunswick-Lüneburg) married the heiress Countess Elizabeth of Eberstein (c.1415-1468), which gave him the possession of the County of Eberstein in 1408. The dukes included the arms of Eberstein and Homburg in their coat of arms in 1482. Their descendants, the later Electors of Hanover and the Dukes of Brunswick, continued to do so. (Source: https://www.wikipe.wiki/wiki/nl/Wapens_van_Brunswijk_en_Lueneburg); 4: Lordship of Homburg; in 1409 w:Bernard I, Duke of Brunswick-Lüneburg (1358/64-1434) ("Middle House of Lüneburg") bought the lordship of Homburg, whose lords had died out in 1408. (Source: https://www.wikipe.wiki/wiki/nl/Wapens_van_Brunswijk_en_Lueneburg); 5: county of Diepholz. In 1585 the lords of Diepholz died out with Frederick II. The area later named a county fell to Duke William of Brunswick-Celle, (w:William the Younger, Duke of Brunswick-Lüneburg (d.1592)) the founder of the newer branch of Lüneburg. His brother Hendrik van Brunswijk-Dannenberg (w:Henry, Duke of Brunswick-Dannenberg (1533-1598))) was the founder of the newer branch Brunswijk. They both included Diepholz's coat of arms in their coat of arms.; 6: w:de:Grafschaft Lohra; county of Lohra; county of Lauterberg; 7: 7a: w:County of Hoya; w:de:Grafschaft Hoya; In 1582 the house of Hoya died out with Count Otto VIII. Half of the county of Hoya belonged to Duke Wilhelm of Brunswick-Celle (?w:William the Younger, Duke of Brunswick-Lüneburg (1535-1592)) from the middle branch of Lüneburg, the other half to Duke Julius of Brunswick-Wolfenbüttel from the middle branch of Brunswick. The coat of arms of the County of Hoya and the associated lordships of Alt-Bruchhausen and Neu-Bruchhauden were added to the arms of both branches. Brunswijk-Wolfenbüttel carried this coat of arms until 1596 and Brunswijk-Harburg until 1624. (Source: https://www.wikipe.wiki/wiki/nl/Wapens_van_Brunswijk_en_Lueneburg); 7b1: lordship of Neu-Bruchhausen; Wappen der Grafschaft Neubruchhausen; 7b2:; lordship of Alt-Bruchhausen; 8: county of Diepholz; 9: w:de:Hohnstein (Adelsgeschlecht); county of Hohnstein; In 1593, the Klettenberg branch of the Counts of Hohnstein died out. The Counts of Stolberg inherited the county, but Brunswijk also claimed the county as liege lord. In 1596, the Dukes of Brunswick-Wolfenbüttel took up the arms in their coat of arms. Eventually the county was divided between Brunswijk and Stolberg. (Source: https://www.wikipe.wiki/wiki/nl/Wapens_van_Brunswijk_en_Lueneburg); 10: w:County of Regenstein; In 1162 the Comes de Regenstein (Count of Regenstein), Conrad, was mentioned for the first time. He was the son of Count Poppo I of Blankenburg, a vassal of the Duke of Saxony. After Poppo's death around 1161, his sons divided their heritage: Conrad took his residence at Regenstein Castle, 4 km (2.5 mi) north of Blankenburg, and became the ancestor of the noble House of Regenstein, while his brother Siegfried I retained Blankenburg Castle. In the 15th century, the Regenstein counts moved to nearby Blankenburg Castle. Regenstein fell into disrepair and became a ruin. The last male descendant of the noble family, Count John Ernest of Regenstein, died in 1599.; 11: w:de:Grafschaft Klettenberg; county of Klettenberg; in 1593, the Klettenberg branch of the Counts of Hohnstein died out.; 12: w:County of Blankenburg. In 1599 the counts of Blankenburg died out with Count Johan Ernst. The county came to Brunswick-Wolfenbüttel as a vacant fief. The arms of the counts of Blankenburg were also added. After the death of Duke Hendrik Julius in 1613, the ranking was changed by his successor Frederik Ulrich. With this duke the middle house Brunswijk (in Wolfenbüttel) died out in 1634.(Source: https://www.wikipe.wiki/wiki/nl/Wapens_van_Brunswijk_en_Lueneburg); More information see w:nl:Wapens van Brunswijk en Lüneburg)

== See also ==
- Guelph Treasure
- Family tree of German monarchs
