= Henry V of Brunswick-Lüneburg =

Duke of Brunswick-Lüneburg and Prince of Wolfenbüttel (1489–1568)

Henry V of Brunswick-Wolfenbüttel
- Duke of Brunswick-Lüneburg
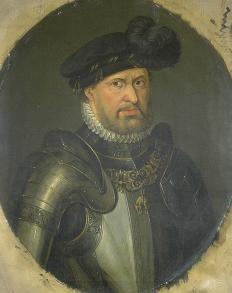
- Duke Henry the Younger

Prince of Brunswick-Wolfenbüttel
- Reign: 1514–1568
- Born: 10 November 1489; Wolfenbüttel, Brunswick-Lüneburg
- Died: 11 June 1568 (aged 78); Wolfenbüttel
- Buried: St Mary's Church, Wolfenbüttel
- Noble family: House of Welf
- Spouses: Maria of Württemberg; Sophie Jagiellon
- Issue: Margaret; Andrew; Catherine; Mary; Charles Victor; Philip; Julius; Clara
- Father: Henry IV, Duke of Brunswick-Lüneburg
- Mother: Catherine of Pomerania

Henry V of Brunswick-Wolfenbüttel (Latin: Henricus; 10 November 1489 – 11 June 1568), called the Younger, (Heinrich der Jüngere), Was a member of the House of Welf, was Duke of Brunswick-Lüneburg and ruling Prince of Brunswick-Wolfenbüttel from 1514 until his death. The last Catholic of the Welf princes, he was known for the large number of wars in which he was involved and for the long-standing affair with his mistress Eva von Trott.

== Life ==
Henry was born at Wolfenbüttel Castle, the son of Duke Henry IV of Brunswick-Lüneburg, known as Henry the Elder, and his consort Catherine, a daughter of the Griffin duke Eric II of Pomerania. His father had received the Principality of Brunswick-Wolfenbüttel in the course of a subdivision of the Brunswick lands in 1495.

Henry succeeded as ruling Prince of Wolfenbüttel when his father was killed in a 1514 battle during the Saxon feud. He soon entered into the Great Diocesan Feud with the Prince-Bishopric of Hildesheim under John IV of Saxe-Lauenburg, against whom he lost the Battle of Soltau in 1519. However, the duke profited from his support of Charles V in the succession as Holy Roman Emperor, and in 1523 the Bishopric had to cede large territories to Wolfenbüttel. Henry remained loyal to the Imperial authority during the German Peasants' War, and in 1528 he assisted Emperor Charles V in the War of the League of Cognac against King Francis I of France in Italy.

While Henry initially leaned towards Protestantism and supported parts of the Augsburg Confession in 1530, he remained Catholic. He was involved in an ongoing conflict with the Protestant Electorate of Saxony, and strongly protested when the Calenberg branch of Brunswick-Lüneburg switched to Protestantism. In 1541, under a pretext but actually to gain the fertile mines of Rammelsberg, Henry attacked the Protestant Imperial City of Goslar. When in 1542 Elector John Frederick I of Saxony and Landgrave Philip I of Hesse as members of the Protestant Schmalkaldic League came to the help of Goslar, they managed to occupy the complete Principality of Wolfenbüttel. Henry fled to the Duchy of Bavaria.

In 1545, Henry recruited an army with the support of Emperor Charles and managed to take control of parts of Wolfenbüttel. But in October he was captured by Hessian troops and kept prisoner, until the Emperor finally defeated the Schmalkaldic League at the Battle of Mühlberg, freed Henry and reinstated him in 1547. In 1550 the mercenaries of Count Volrad of Mansfeld occupied Wolfenbüttel, and Henry again fled, this time to the Emperor's troops at Metz. But Mansfeld soon left, and Henry returned. In 1553, he allied himself with Elector Maurice of Saxony against Margrave Albert Alcibiades of Brandenburg-Kulmbach, who had attacked Wolfenbüttel. This conflict culminated in the bloody Battle of Sievershausen, in which Maurice as well as Henry's two eldest sons were killed. The battle, however, ended in a victory for Henry.

Henry finally converted to Protestantism under the influence of his only remaining son, Julius, and died in 1568 at Wolfenbüttel.

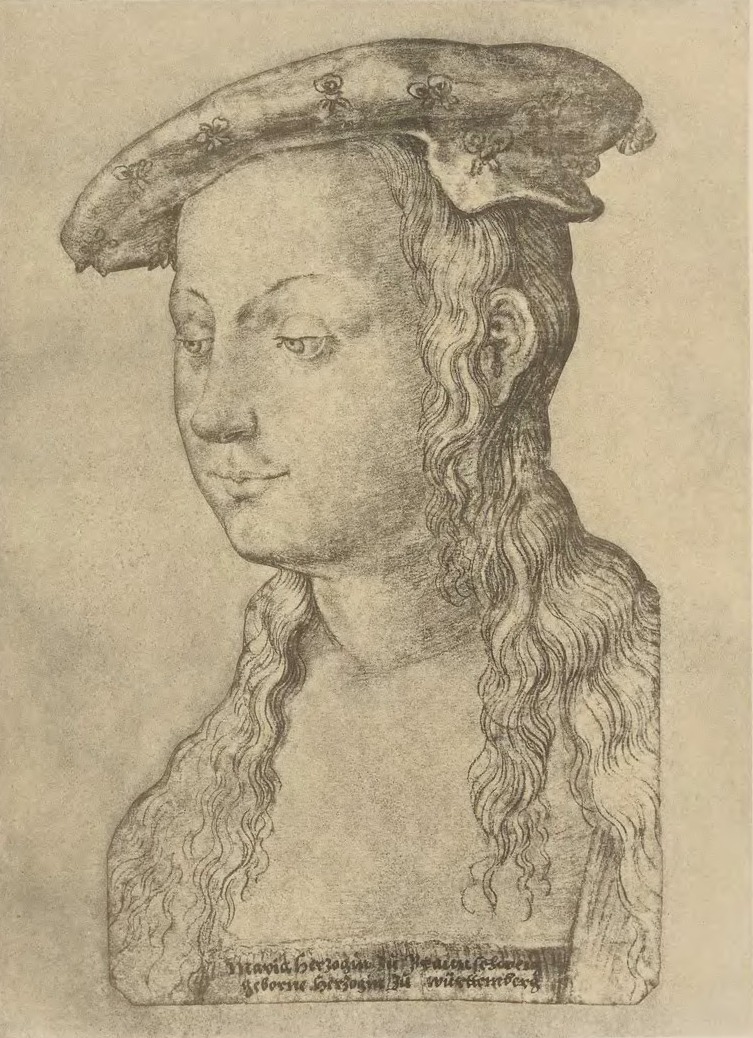
Maria of Brunswick 1496-1541

== Family ==
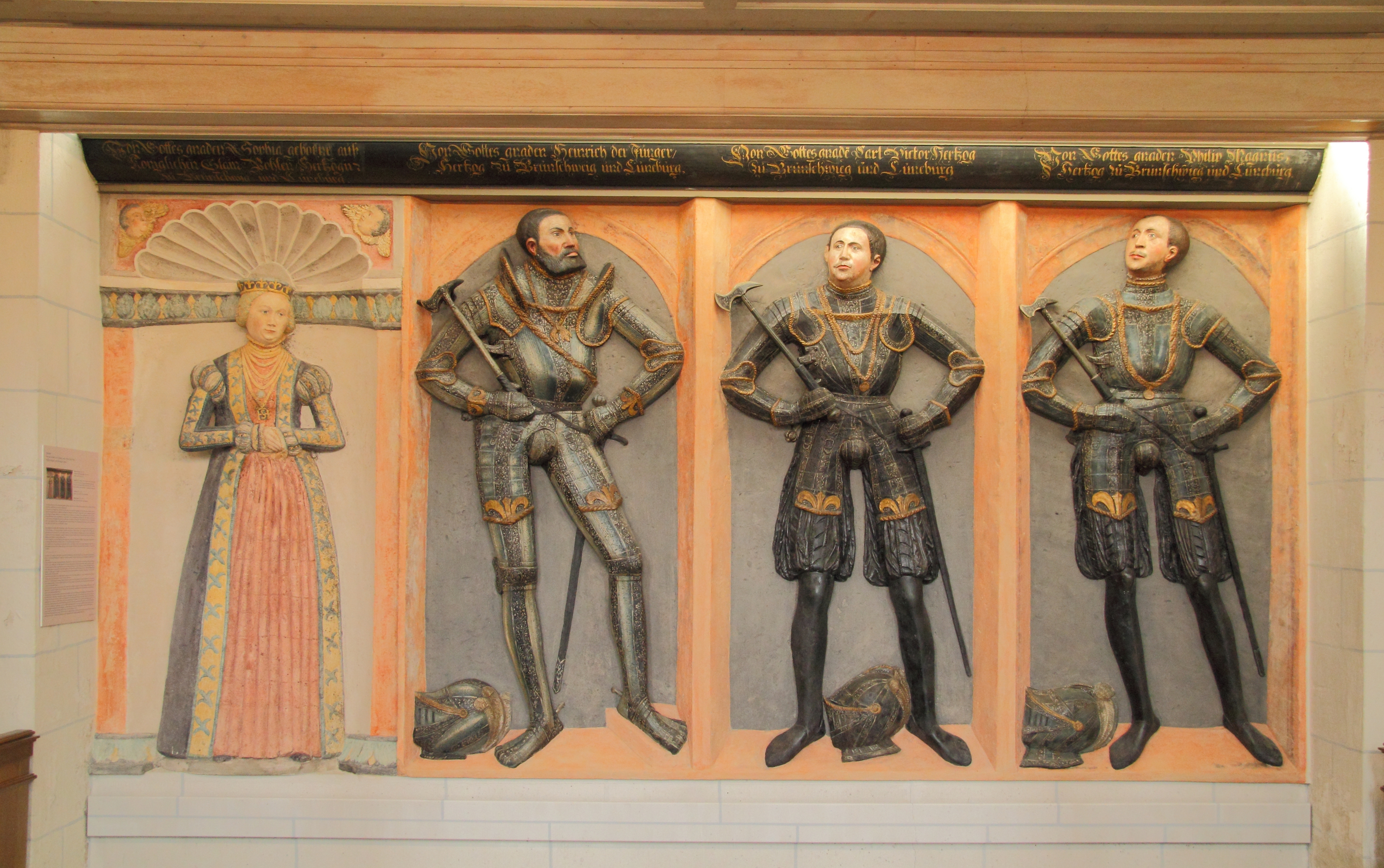
Tomb of Duke Henry, his consort Sophia, and his sons Charles Victor and Philip, St Mary's Church, Wolfenbüttel

Henry firstly married Maria (1496-1541), daughter of Henry, Count of Württemberg, former Count of Montbéliard, in 1515. They had the following children:

- Margaret (1516–1580), married John of Poděbrady, Duke of Münsterberg and Oels, in 1561
- Andrew (c. 1517–c. 1517)
- Catherine (c. 1518–1574), married Margrave John of Brandenburg-Küstrin, son of Elector Joachim I Nestor of Brandenburg in 1537
- Mary (c. 1521–1539), became Abbess of Gandersheim in 1532
- Charles Victor (1525–1553), killed in the Battle of Sievershausen
- Philip (1527–1553), killed in the Battle of Sievershausen
- Julius, Duke of Brunswick-Lüneburg (1528–1589), Prince of Wolfenbüttel from 1568
- Clara (1532–1595), succeeded her sister Mary as Abbess of Gandersheim in 1539, later married Duke Philip II of Brunswick-Lüneburg, Prince of Grubenhagen, in 1560

In 1556 Henry secondly married Sophia Jagiellon (died 1575), daughter of King Sigismund I of Poland, in 1556. The second marriage was childless.

Henry's affair with his mistress Eva von Trott (1506–1567), a lady-in-waiting to his consort Maria of Württemberg, produced ten children [1522-1558]. When rumours about his amour spread, he pretended she had died and arranged for a feigned funeral at Gandersheim Abbey, while she hid in Liebenburg Castle. Eva and the duke continued to meet even after Maria's death. She likewise had to flee from the Brunswick lands during the Schmalkaldic War in 1543, but returned and retired to Hildesheim. The ducal affair inspired Martin Luther to write his libel Wider Hans Worst in 1541.

== Sources ==
- Nowakowska, Natalia, ed. (2019). Remembering the Jagiellonians. Routledge. ISBN 978-1-138-56239-4.
- (in German) Zedlers Universal-Lexicon, vol. 12, p. 777-778
- Braunschweigische Landesgeschichte im Überblick, Braunschweig 1977
- (in German) At the House of Welf site

Henry V of Brunswick-Lüneburg House of Welf Cadet branch of the House of Este Born: 10 November 1489 Died: 11 June 1568
Regnal titles
Preceded by Henry IV	Duke of Brunswick-Lüneburg; Prince of Brunswick-Wolfenbüttel; 1514–1568	Succeeded by Julius
