= Herzberger =

Herzberger is a surname. Notable people with the surname include:

- Magda Herzberger (1926–2021), Romanian author, poet and composer
- Maximilian Herzberger (1899–1982), German mathematician and physicist
- Radhika Herzberger (born 1938), Indian writer, educationist and scholar in Sanskrit and Indology

== See also ==
- Herzberg (disambiguation)
- Herzenberg
- Hertzberger
