= Philip I of Brunswick-Grubenhagen =

Philip I, Duke of Brunswick-Grubenhagen
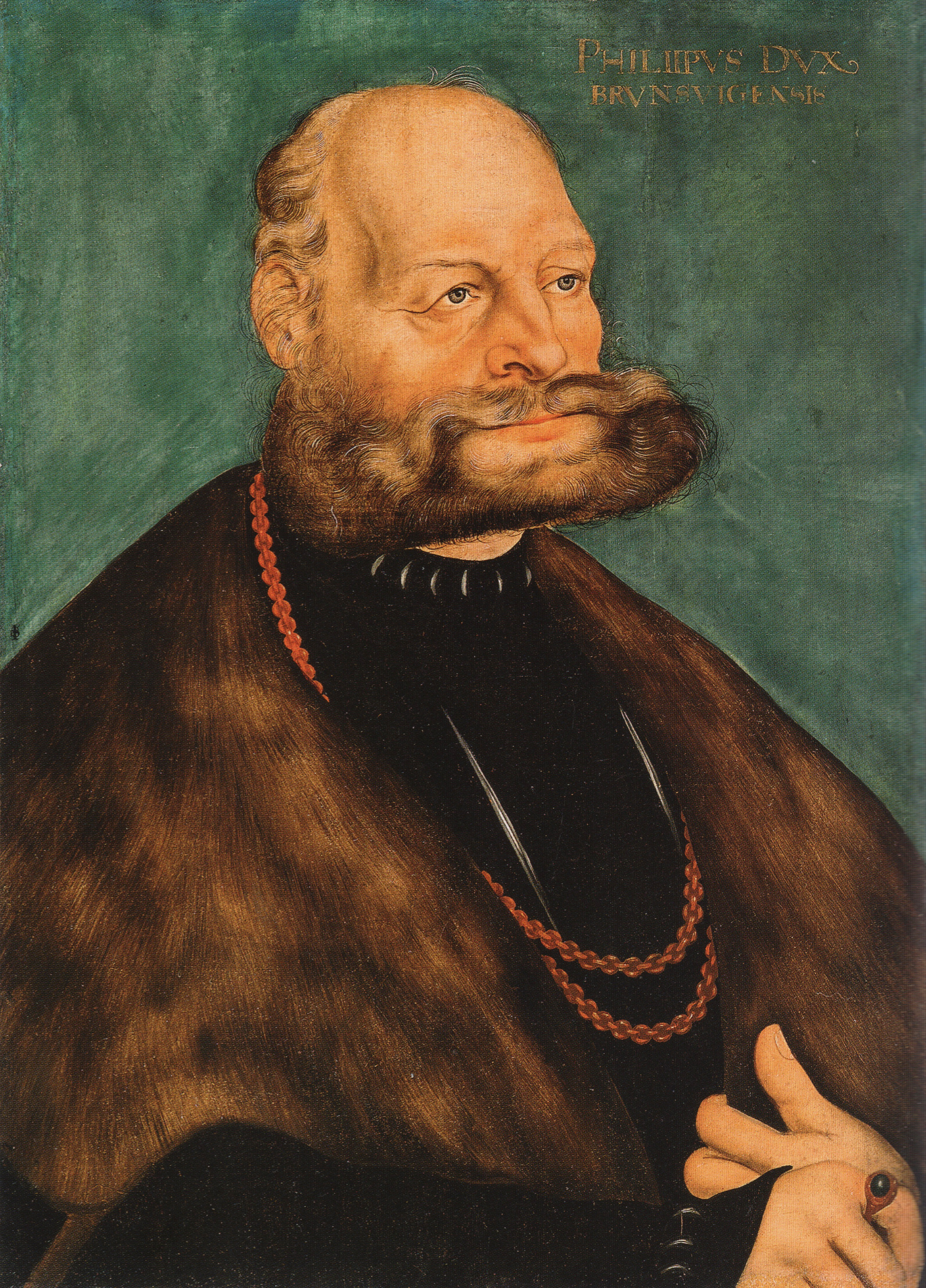
- Portrait by Lucas Cranach the Elder
- Born: 1476
- Died: 4 September 1551 (aged 74–75); Herzberg
- Spouse: N.N. Catherine of Mansfeld-Vorderort
- Issue: Ernest III; Catherine; Wolfgang; Philip II
- House: House of Guelf
- Father: Albert II, Duke of Brunswick-Grubenhagen
- Mother: Countess Elizabeth of Waldeck

Philip I, Duke of Brunswick-Grubenhagen (German: Philipp I., Herzog von Braunschweig-Grubenhagen; 1476 – 4 September 1551, Herzberg) was a member of the House of Guelph. He was ruler of the Principality of Grubenhagen. He was the second son of Duke Albert II of Grubenhagen and his wife Elizabeth, née Countess of Waldeck. Philip was the last member of the Grubenhagen line to use the title Duke of Brunswick. His successors used the title Duke of Brunswick and Lüneburg, like most other princes of the House of Guelph.

After his father's death in 1485, he was first under the guardianship of his cousin Henry IV and his mother Elisabeth. As early as 1486 he signed deeds himself. In 1494, he took up the government of his principality. His seat, Herzberg Castle, was completely destroyed in a fire in 1510. His cousin Henry died childless in 1526 and Philip inherited Henry's part of the principality, thereby reuniting all of Grubenhagen under a single Duke for the first time since 1479.

Philip was one of the first princes to follow the Reformation. He was present at the Diet of Worms in 1521 and joined the League of Torgau in 1526. In 1531, he formed, with other princes, the Schmalkaldic League. He then reformed the monasteries in his principality and in 1538, he adopted a Church order for Grubenhagen and declared the papal doctrine to be abolished. In 1546 Philip and his sons participated in a military campaign in the Schmalkaldic War in southern Germany, which ended unsuccessfully at Ingolstadt. This campaign drew the ire of Emperor Charles V. After the utter defeat of the Protestants, he was acquitted in 1548 and reinstated as Duke.

After his death in 1551, he was succeeded by his son Ernest III in the government, and after Ernest's death in 1567, Ernest was succeeded by his younger brother Wolfgang. When Wolfgang died in 1595 without male offspring, he was succeeded by Philip's youngest son, Philip II. With Philip II's death without male offspring in 1596, the male line of the Grubenhagen line of the House of Guelph died out.

== Marriage and issue ==
Philip I. was married twice. His first wife probably died in childbirth, in 1509. They had one son:

- Philip (1509–1512)

He then married Catherine of Mansfeld-Vorderort (born October 1, 1501; died 1535). They had nine children:

- Ernest III (born: 17 December 1518; died April 2, 1567), Duke of Brunswick-Grubenhagen

married Anne Margaret of Pomerania-Stettin (1551–1567)

- Elizabeth (born: 18 March 1520, died 1520)
- Albert (born: 20 October 1521; died in battle 20 October 1546)
- Phillip (born: 10 June 1523, died 1531)
- Catherine (born: 30 August 1524; died 24 February 1581)

married firstly Duke John Ernest of Saxe-Coburg;
married secondly Philip II, Count of Schwarzburg-Leutenberg

- John (born: 28 May 1526; died in the Battle of Saint-Quentin, 2 September 1557, Saint-Quentin, France)
- Barbara (born:25 January 1528; died 1528)
- Wolfgang (born: 6 April 1531; died 14 March 1595), Duke of Brunswick-Grubenhagen

married Dorothea of Saxe-Lauenburg (1567–1595)

- Philip II (born: 2 May 1533, died: 4 April 1596), Duke of Brunswick-Grubenhagen

married Clara of Brunswick-Wolfenbüttel (1595–1596)

== Ancestors ==
Ancestors of Philip I of Brunswick-Grubenhagen

8. Albert I, Duke of Brunswick-Grubenhagen
4. Eric I, Duke of Brunswick-Grubenhagen
9. Agnes of Brunswick-Lüneburg
2. Albert II, Duke of Brunswick-Grubenhagen
10. Otto I, Duke of Brunswick-Göttingen
5. Elisabeth of Brunswick-Göttingen
11. Margaret of Jülich-Berg
1. Philip I, Duke of Brunswick-Grubenhagen
12. Henry VII, Count of Waldeck
6. Wolrad I, Count of Waldeck
13. Margaret of Nassau-Wiesbaden-Idstein
3. Elisabeth of Waldeck
14. Michael I, Count of Wertheim
7. Barbara of Wertheim
15. Sophie of Henneberg

Philip I of Brunswick-Grubenhagen House of Welf Born: 1476 Died: 4 September 1551
Preceded by Albert II	Duke of Brunswick-Lüneburg; Prince of Grubenhagen; 1485–1551	Succeeded by Ernest III
