= Wolfgang, Duke of Brunswick-Grubenhagen =

Wolfgang of Brunswick-Grubenhagen
- Duke of Brunswick-Lüneburg; Prince of Grubenhagen
- Born: 6 April 1531; Herzberg
- Died: 14 May 1595 (aged 64); Herzberg
- Spouse: Dorothea of Saxe-Lauenburg
- House: House of Welf
- Father: Philip I, Duke of Brunswick-Grubenhagen
- Mother: Catherine of Mansfeld

Duke Wolfgang of Brunswick-Grubenhagen (1531–1595) was the Prince of Grubenhagen from 1567 to 1595.

Wolfgang was born on 6 April 1531 in Herzberg, the fifth son of Duke Philip I of Brunswick-Grubenhagen and his second wife, Catherine of Mansfeld. He succeeded his brother, Ernest as Duke in 1567, governing the tiny Principality of Grubenhagen. Like most of his predecessors, he had financial problems, so he was often forced to sell or pledge major parts of his possession and he had to demand high taxes.

In 1581 he gave the citizens of Herzberg the right to provide for their own fuel and timber as well as leaves for fertilizing their fields. He attempted to improve the educational level in his country by establishing a court school in Herzberg. In 1593 he dissolved the county of Lauterberg-Scharzfeld as a fief, to counter the demands of the Counts of Stolberg. In the same year, he confirmed the Harz mining regulations of 1554 and gave Herzberg citizens the right to brew beer and a licence to trade wine.

He created a pleasure garden for his wife Dorothea of Saxe-Lauenburg (born 11 March 1543; died 5 April 1586; daughter of Francis I, Duke of Saxe-Lauenburg) below Herzberg Castle.

Wolfgang died on 14 May 1595 in Herzberg and was buried next to his parents, brothers and wife in the crypt of the St. Giles Church in Osterode am Harz.

He had no children. His younger brother Philip II inherited the principality. On Philip II's death, the Grubenhagen line of the House of Welf died out.

== Ancestors ==
Ancestors of Wolfgang, Duke of Brunswick-Grubenhagen

8. Eric I, Duke of Brunswick-Grubenhagen
4. Albert II, Duke of Brunswick-Grubenhagen
9. Elisabeth of Brunswick-Göttingen
2. Philip I, Duke of Brunswick-Grubenhagen
10. Wolrad I, Count of Waldeck
5. Elisabeth of Waldeck
11. Barbara of Wertheim
1.Wolfgang, Duke of Brunswick-Grubenhagen
12. Albert V, Count of Mansfeld-Vorderort
6. Ernest II, Count of Mansfeld-Vorderort
13. Susanna of Bickenbach
3. Catherine of Mansfeld-Vorderort
14. Bruno VI of Querfurt
7. Barbara of Querfurt
15. Brigitte of Stolberg

Wolfgang, Duke of Brunswick-Grubenhagen House of Welf Born: 6 April 1531 Died: 14 May 1595
Preceded by Ernest III	Duke of Brunswick-Lüneburg; Prince of Grubenhagen; 1567–1595	Succeeded by Philip II
