= Herzberg =

Herzberg is German for "heart mountain" and may refer to:

== Places in Germany ==
- Herzberg am Harz, a town in the Osterode district, Lower Saxony
- Herzberg, Brandenburg, a town in the Elbe-Elster district, Brandenburg
- Herzberg, Ostprignitz-Ruppin, a town in the Ostprignitz-Ruppin district, Brandenburg
- Herzberg, Mecklenburg-Vorpommern, a town in the district of Parchim, Mecklenburg-Vorpommern
- Herzberg Castle, above Herzberg am Harz, Lower Saxony

== Other uses ==
- Herzberg (surname)
- 3316 Herzberg, an asteroid, named after Gerhard Herzberg

== See also ==
- Hertzberg
