= Ernest III =

Ernest III may refer to:

- Ernest III, Duke of Brunswick-Grubenhagen (1518–1567)
- Ernest III, Duke of Saxe-Hildburghausen (1655–1715)
- Ernest III, Duke of Saxe-Coburg-Saalfeld (1784–1844)
- Ernest Frederick III, Duke of Saxe-Hildburghausen (1727–1780)
