= Clara of Brunswick-Wolfenbüttel =

- Born: 16 November 1532; Wolfenbüttel
- Died: 23 November 1595 (aged 63); Herzberg Castle
- Burial: Aegidius Church in Osterode
- Spouse: Philip II, Duke of Brunswick-Grubenhagen
- House: House of Guelph
- Father: Henry II, Duke of Brunswick-Wolfenbüttel
- Mother: Maria of Württemberg

Clara of Brunswick-Wolfenbüttel (16 November 1532 in Wolfenbüttel – 23 November 1595 at Herzberg Castle) was a princess of Brunswick-Wolfenbüttel by birth. She was abbess of the secular Gandersheim Abbey and later Duchess of Brunswick-Grubenhagen by marriage.

== Life ==
Clara was the youngest daughter of the Duke Henry II of Brunswick-Wolfenbüttel (1489–1568) from his first marriage with Maria (1496–1541), daughter of the Earl Henry of Württemberg.

=== Abbess of Gandersheim ===
At the urging of her father, Clara was elected abbess of Gandersheim Abbey after the death of her sister Maria. Since Clara was only 6 years old at the time, officials acting for her father administered the abbey in her name. It is unknown if the Pope ever confirmed Clara as abbess. In any case, she never took up the position.

In 1542, troops of the Schmalkaldic League occupied Gandersheim and forced the Abbey to convert to Lutheranism. The Chapter, however, practiced passive resistance and remained Catholic. In 1543, the abbey suffered from iconoclasm. In 1547, Clara's father declared her resignation from the office of abbess, returning to the lay state.

=== Duchess of Brunswick-Grubenhagen ===
Clara married on 1 July 1560 in Wolfenbüttel with her cousin Duke Philip II of Brunswick-Grubenhagen (1533–1596). As dowry, her father gave her 20000guilders and half the jurisdiction and castle of Westerhof. The marriage remained childless. After their marriage, the couple moved to Katlenburg Castle and converted it to a Renaissance château. Clara was responsible for the installation of numerous pharmacies and distilleries. She also designed the interior of the newly built church in Rotenkirchen.

When Clara's brother Julius inherited Wolfenbüttel in 1568, he also took possession of Westerhof. Clara sued him before the Aulic Council, but in 1580, Philip confirmed Juilius's ownership. Clara then sued Julius over the inheritance of her sister Margaret. The Aulic Council created an imperial commission to look into the matter. Julius, however, rejected the commission and filed a complaint at the Diet of Augsburg of 1582 about the illegal practices of his sister.

Clara and her court moved from Katlenburg Castle to Herzberg Castle. She died in 1595, after a long illness. The court preacher and superintendent Andreas Georg Leopold delivered her funeral sermon, which was also published in printed form. Clara was buried in the Aegidius Church in Osterode am Harz.

== Ancestors ==
Ancestors of Clara of Brunswick-Wolfenbüttel

8. William II, Duke of Brunswick-Calenberg-Göttingen
4. Henry IV, Duke of Brunswick-Lüneburg
9. Elizabeth of Stolberg-Wernigerode
2. Henry V, Duke of Brunswick-Lüneburg
10. Eric II, Duke of Pomerania
5. Catherine of Pomerania
11. Sophia of Pomerania-Stolp
1. Clara of Brunswick-Wolfenbüttel
12. Ulrich V, Count of Württemberg
6. Henry, Count of Württemberg
13. Elisabeth of Bavaria-Landshut
3. Maria of Württemberg
14. John IV, Count of Salm-Obersalm
7. Eva of Salm
15. Margaret of Sierck
