= Hertzberg =

Hertzberg is a surname. Notable people with the surname include:

- A. M. Hertzberg (1852–1917), businessman in Brisbane, Australia
- Arthur Hertzberg (1921–2006), Polish-born American rabbi
- Charles Hertzberg (1886–1944), Major-General of the Royal Canadian Engineering Corps
- Daniel Hertzberg, American journalist
- Ebbe Carsten Horneman Hertzberg, Norwegian member of the Council of State Division in Stockholm 1884
- Ewald Friedrich, Count von Hertzberg (1725–1795), Prussian statesman
- Frederick Hertzberg (1923–2000), American psychologist
- Gustav Hertzberg (1826–1907), German historian
- Hendrik Hertzberg, American journalist
- Joseph Hertzberg (d. 1870), Russian writer and translator
- Nils Christian Egede Hertzberg, Norwegian Minister of Education and Church Affairs 1882–1884
- Robert Hertzberg, American attorney, businessman and politician
- Sidney Hertzberg (1922–2005), American pro basketball player
- Vicki Hertzberg, American biostatistician

== See also ==
- Hertzberg Island, Ontario
- Herzberg (disambiguation)
