= Ernest III of Brunswick-Grubenhagen =

Ernest III, Duke of Brunswick-Grubenhagen
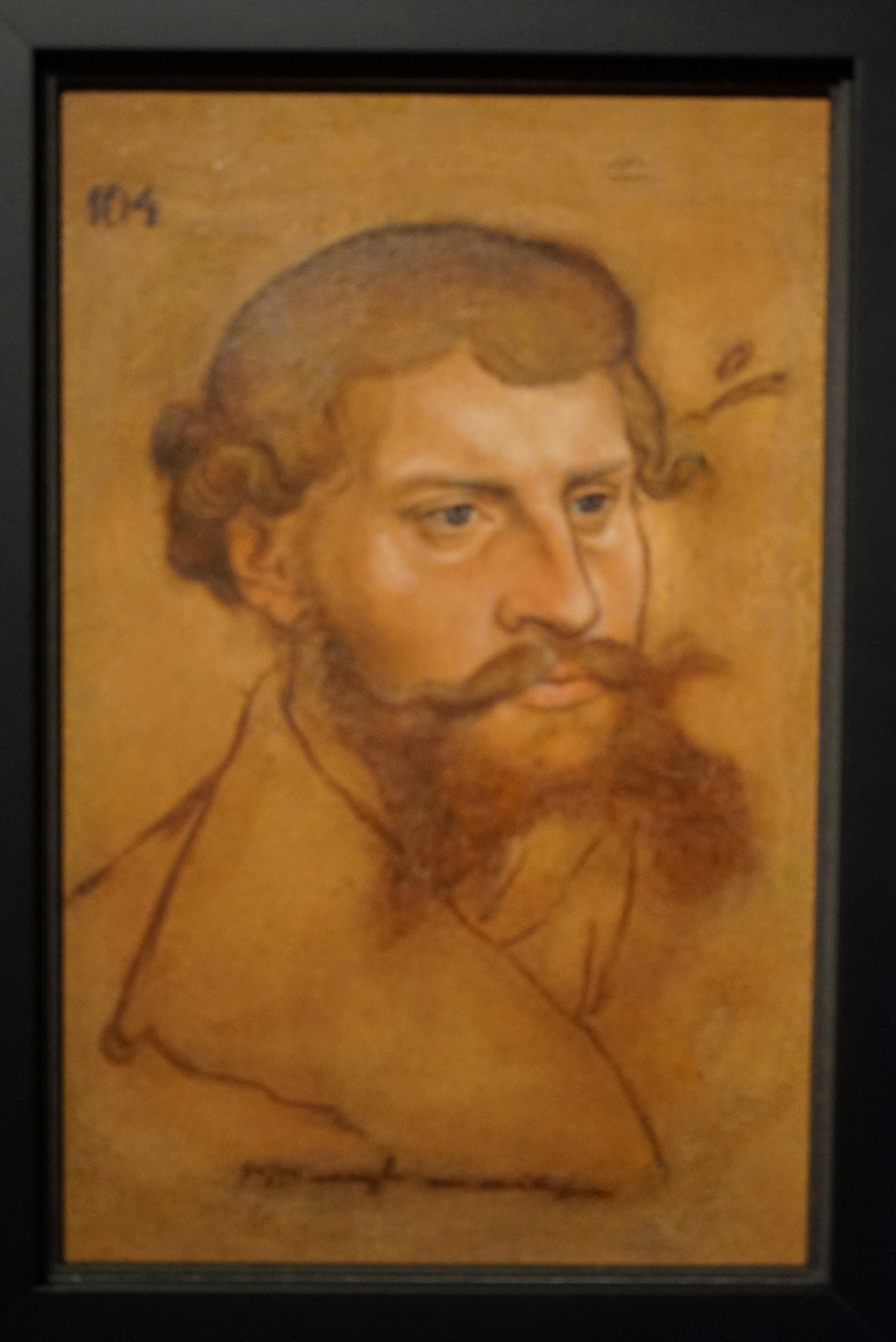
- Ernest III, by Cranach, Museum of Fine Arts, Reims
- Born: 17 December 1518; Osterode am Harz
- Died: 2 April 1567 (aged 48); Herzberg am Harz
- Spouse: Princess Margaret of Pomerania-Wolgast
- Issue: Elisabeth
- House: House of Guelph
- Father: Philip I, Duke of Brunswick-Grubenhagen
- Mother: Countess Catherine of Mansfeld-Vorderort

Ernest III of Brunswick-Grubenhagen-Herzberg (by a different counting: Ernest IV; 17 December 1518 in Osterode am Harz – 2 April 1567 in Herzberg Castle, Herzberg am Harz), was a member of the noble family of Guelph and a duke of Brunswick-Grubenhagen.

== Life ==
Ernest was the eldest son of Duke Philip I of Brunswick-Grubenhagen (1476–1551) and his second wife, Countess Catherine of Mansfeld-Vorderort (1501–1535), eldest daughter of Count Ernest II and his first wife Barbara of Querfurt. His paternal grandparents were Duke Albert II of Brunswick-Grubenhagen and his wife Countess Elisabeth of Waldeck.

Together with his father and brothers, he took part in a military campaign in southern Germany in 1546, during the Schmalkaldic War, which ended unsuccessfully at Ingolstadt.

== Marriage and issue ==
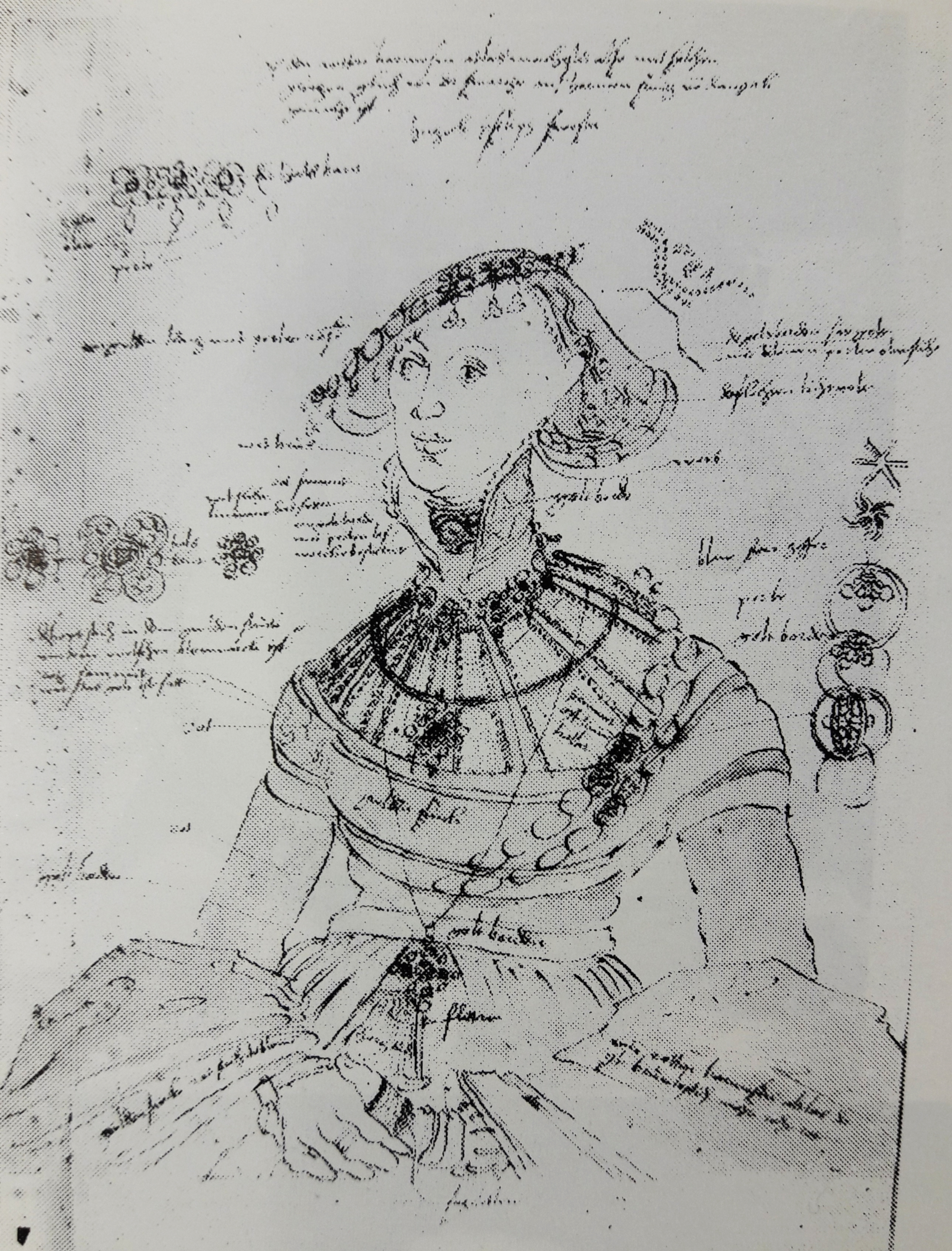
Princess Margaret of Pomerania-Wolgast (1518–1569) by Lucas Cranach the Elder

On 9 October 1547 in Wolgast, Duke Ernest III married Princess Margaret of Pomerania-Wolgast (1518–1569), eldest daughter of Duke George I of Pomerania and his first wife, Princess Amalia of the Palatinate. From this marriage only one daughter reached adulthood:

- Elizabeth (born 14 April 1550 in Salzderhelden; died: 11 February 1586 in Østerholm on Als) 19

married in August 1568 Duke John II of Schleswig-Holstein-Sonderburg (1545–1622). That marriage produced 14 children:

* Dorothea (1569–1593) married Duke Frederick IV of Legnica, Silesia
* Christian (1570–1633), Duke of Schleswig-Holstein-Sonderburg-Ærø
* Ernest (1572–1596), Duke of Schleswig-Holstein-Sonderburg
* Alexander (1573–1627), Duke of Schleswig-Holstein-Sonderburg, married Countess Dorothea of Schwarzburg-Sondershausen
* August (1574–1596), Duke of Schleswig-Holstein-Sonderburg
* Mary (1575–1640), abbess of Itzehoe
* John Adolph (1576–1624), Duke of Schleswig-Holstein-Norburg
* Anna (1577–1610) married 1601 Duke Bogislaw XIII of Pomerania
* Sophie (1579–1618) married 1607 Duke Philip II of Pomerania-Stettin
* Elizabeth (1580–1653) married 1615 Duke Bogislaw XIV of Pomerania
* Frederick (1581–1658), Duke of Schleswig-Holstein-Norburg married firstly in 1627 princess Juliana of Saxe-Lauenburg and secondly in 1632 Eleanore Princess of Anhalt-Zerbst
* Margaret (1583–1638) married 1603 Count John VII of Nassau-Siegen
* Philip (1584–1663), Duke of Schleswig-Holstein-Glücksburg married Princess Sophie Hedwig of Saxe-Lauenburg
* Albert (1585–1613), Duke of Schleswig-Holstein-Sonderburg

Because Ernest had no sons, after his death, his duchy was inherited by his younger brother Wolfgang. When he, too, died without a male heir, the duchy was inherited by their youngest brother, Philip II. With Philip's death, the Brunswick-Grubenhagen line of the House of Guelph died out, and the duchy was merged back into Brunswick-Wolfenbüttel.

== Ancestors ==
Ancestors of Ernest III of Brunswick-Grubenhagen

8. Eric I, Duke of Brunswick-Grubenhagen
4. Albert II, Duke of Brunswick-Grubenhagen
9. Elisabeth of Brunswick-Göttingen
2. Philip I, Duke of Brunswick-Grubenhagen
10. Wolrad I, Count of Waldeck
5. Elisabeth of Waldeck
11. Barbara of Wertheim
1.Ernest III, Duke of Brunswick-Grubenhagen
12. Albert V, Count of Mansfeld-Vorderort
6. Ernest II, Count of Mansfeld-Vorderort
13. Susanna of Bickenbach
3. Catherine of Mansfeld-Vorderort
14. Bruno VI of Querfurt
7. Barbara of Querfurt
15. Brigitte of Stolberg

== References and sources ==
- Paul Zimmermann: Das Haus Braunschweig-Grubenhagen, Wolfenbüttel, 1911
- Georg Max: Geschichte des Fürstentums Grubenhagen, Hannover, 1862

Ernest III of Brunswick-Grubenhagen House of Welf Cadet branch of the House of Este Born: 17 December 1518 Died: 2 April 1567
Preceded by Philip I	Duke of Brunswick-Lüneburg; Prince of Grubenhagen; 1551–1567	Succeeded by Wolfgang
