= Langeloh =

- Stadtteil of Schneverdingen
- Interactive map of Langeloh
- Location within Germany Location within Lower Saxony
- Coordinates: 53°03′59″N 09°48′05″E
- Country: Germany
- State: Lower Saxony
- District: Soltau-Fallingbostel
- Town: Schneverdingen
- Elevation: 96 m (315 ft)

Population (2011)
  - Total: 654
- Time zone: UTC+01:00 (CET)
  - Summer (DST): UTC+02:00 (CEST)
- Postal codes: 29640
- Dialling codes: 05193

Langeloh is a village within the town of Schneverdingen in the district of Soltau-Fallingbostel in the North German state of Lower Saxony. The village lies about 5 kilometres (3.1 mi) south of the town and is linked to it by the district roads (Kreisstrassen) K26 and K33. The parish is characterised by fields and moors with farm woodland and borders on the Pietzmoor.

== History ==
On 28 June 1519 in the village of Langeloh the last knights' battle in Europe - the Battle of Soltau - took place as part of the Hildesheim Diocesan Feud. A force of Hildesheim and Lüneburg troops destroyed the Brunswick-Welf army. Formerly an independent municipality, it is part of the town Schneverdingen since 1974.

== Politics ==
The parish chair is Regina Dinges.

== Culture and places of interest ==
Near Langeloh is a field of tumuli. The Böhmetal bei Huckenrieth nature reserve is partly located in the parish of Langeloh.
