= Hertzberger =

Hertzberger is a surname. Notable people with the surname include:

- Eddie Hertzberger (1904–1993), Dutch industrialist
- Herman Hertzberger (born 1932), Dutch architect
- Jeroen Hertzberger (born 1986), Dutch field hockey player
- Rosanne Hertzberger (born 1984), Dutch politician

See also

- Herzberger
