= Eva von Trott =

German royal mistress (1505–1567)

- Born: 1505; Hildesheim, Germany
- Died: January 12, 1567 (aged 61–62); Germany

Eva von Trott (1505 – 12 January 1567), was the royal mistress of Henry V, Duke of Brunswick-Lüneburg, from 1522 until 1567. The affair was a contemporary scandal and was used as propaganda against the duke of Brunswick in Wider Hans Worst by Martin Luther during the Schmalkaldic War.

== Life ==
Eva von Trott came from a noble family and was a maid of honour at the court of Brunswick. In 1522, she became the lover of Henry V. From 1524 onward, she had ten children with him.. Her family as well as the duchess demanded a discontinuation of the affair. Henry V then had Eva von Trott declared dead by the plague and a wooden doll buried in her place, while she herself was smuggled out and hidden in a castle, where Henry V continued to visit her in secret. In 1558, Henry V ended the affair and provided her with a residence in Hildesheim.

She has been portrayed in fiction.
