= Battle of Soltau =

1519 battle

Coordinates: 53°02′17″N 9°47′35″E

- Part of the Hildesheim Diocesan Feud
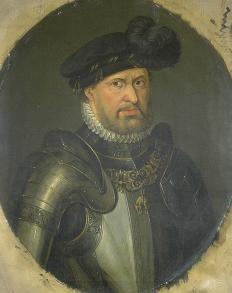
- Henry II (the Younger), who was defeated, but escaped
Date	28 June 1519
Location	near Soltau, in present-day Germany
Result	Lüneburg victory. Brunswick forces flee into the surrounding bogs

Belligerents
Brunswick; Calenberg	Lüneburg; Hildesheim

Commanders and leaders
Henry the Younger; Eric the Elder (POW)	Henry the Middle; Bishop John IV

Strength
4,000 levies 3,000 Landsknechte; 700 knights in armour 24 cannon	7,000 foot soldiers 1,500 knights in armour

Casualties and losses
Est. 3,000 to 3,500 killed	Est. 10 to 200 killed

The Battle of Soltau (German: Schlacht bei Soltau) took place on 28 June 1519 and was the military climax of the Hildesheim Diocesan Feud which lasted from 1519–1523. Some sources describe it as "the last knights' battle" (Die letzte Ritterschlacht). It is also often described as the "last medieval feud".

The feud had all the hallmarks of a typical dispute between noble families of that time. At its heart was the division of revenue and territorial claims, mainly on the land of the Bishopric of Hildesheim. Two aspects, however, made it rather different. Firstly, the main protagonists on both sides were members of the princely House of Welf family and secondly, the warring parties simultaneously supported different pretenders to the imperial elections of the Holy Roman Empire. The Brunswick-Calenberg party, with dukes Henry II of Brunswick-Wolfenbüttel and Eric I of Calenberg at its head, favoured the Habsburg Charles (later Emperor Charles V), the Lüneburg-Hildesheim coalition under Duke Henry the Middle and Bishop John IV supported the election of Francis I of France as the new emperor.

Despite their convincing victory at the Battle of Soltau, the Lüneburg-Hildesheim alliance eventually lost the war against Brunswick and Calenberg, when Emperor Charles V banned both Henry, Duke of Lüneburg, and Prince-Bishop John.

== Background ==
The forces of Brunswick numbered about 7,000 foot soldiers (of which 4,000 were feudal levies and 3,000 were professional Landsknechte) and 700 armoured cavalry (Reisige). The Lüneburgers also had purportedly over 7,000 infantrymen, but their cavalry force, of about 1,500 horse, was considerably stronger. The Brunswickians took 24 cannon and a large baggage train with them; the strength of the Lüneburg artillery is unknown. As it happened, only the lighter guns could be deployed for the battle itself. The professional infantry fought in compact squares (Gevierthaufen). Following Swiss practice, the first three to five ranks carried pikes up to six metres long, whilst the rear ranks were mainly equipped with the shorter halberds or similar. Occasionally two-handed swords and matchlock-arquebuses were carried, but they played a secondary role. Nothing is known of the weapons carried by the levies.

Both armies marched in the usual order for that period. At the head was a vanguard (Vortrab) also known as the Verlorener Haufen or 'forlorn hope', which in the case of the Brunswick force numbered some 1,500 Landsknechte, accompanied by 300 cavalry and a section of artillery (probably the field guns). This was followed by the main body of 4,500 men (500 Landsknechte, accompanied by the rest of the cavalry) and a rearguard (Nachhut) of 1,000 Landsknechte. The baggage train would have been at least as large as the army itself, especially on the Brunswick side, which took with it a large quantity of treasure and its war chest. Nothing is known about the order of march of the Lüneburg army, but it was probably similar to that of Brunswick. However, for reasons that are not explained anywhere, the Lüneburgers had allowed their foot soldiers to fall behind, so that on 28 June only their cavalry initially stood in the way of the Brunswickians.

== Prelude ==
After a long, at times parallel, pursuit both armies met around midday on the 28 June 1519 northwest of Soltau between the villages of Vahlzen and Langeloh. The weather was warm, but cloudy. Both parties occupied a rise, between which there was a piece of marshy terrain about 700 metres wide. The Brunswickians facing south had secured their flanks on two bogs, the Vahlzen Moor (Vahlzener Moor) to the west and the Dickmoor to the east (the latter appears to have been much wetter and marshier).

Precise information on the positioning of the two forces does not exist. However, it is known that the Lüneburgers had divided their cavalry into five Fähnlein, four of 225 each and one of 600 horsemen. It is reckoned that the Brunswickians had largely remained in their march formation and only assembled their 700 horsemen alongside their vanguard. If it were possible they would also have brought their field pieces into position at the edge of the hill they had now occupied. However it is likely that the two dukes in command were not agreed about the action to be taken in the face of the enemy.

== Battle ==
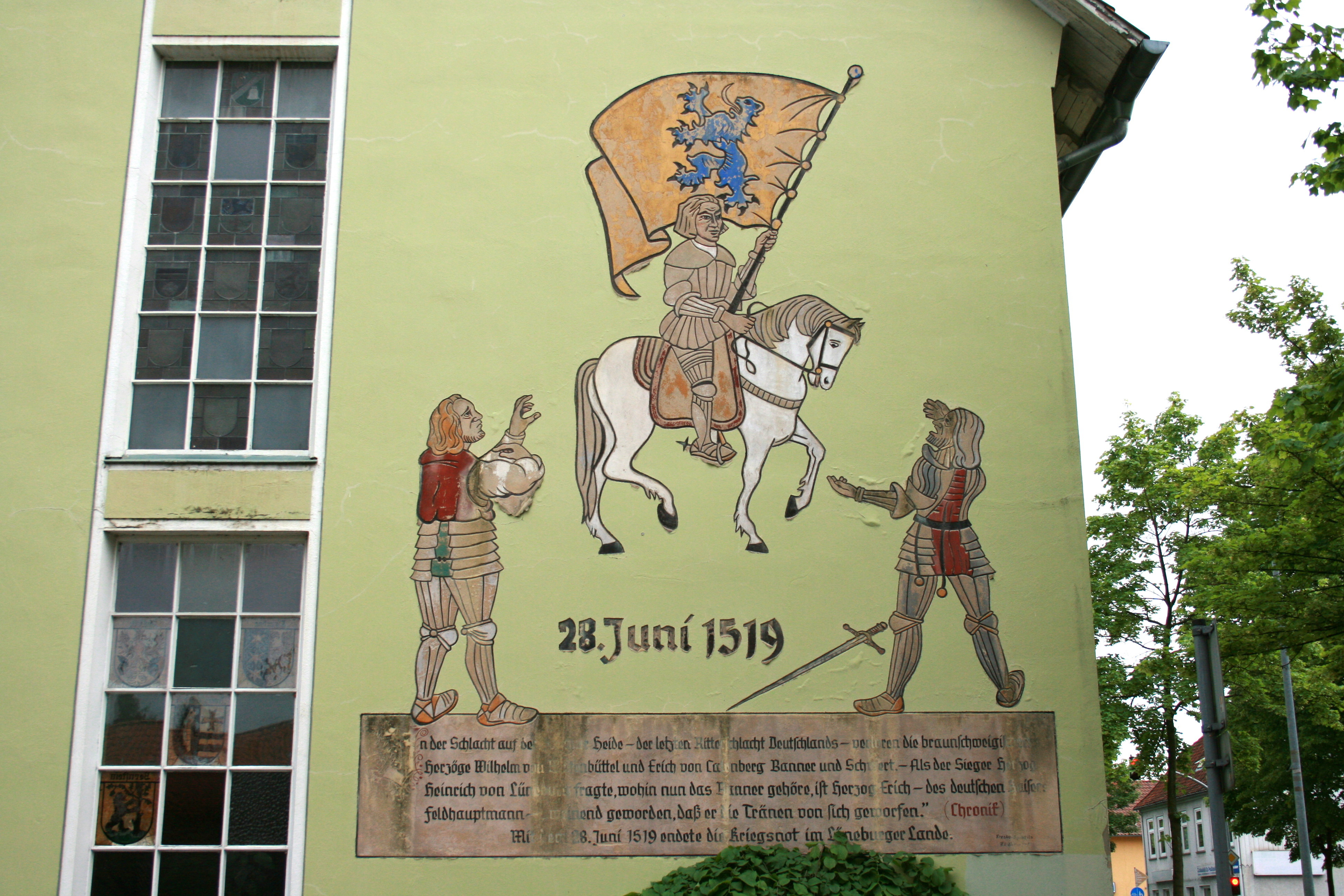
Mural of the battle on the council office building in Soltau

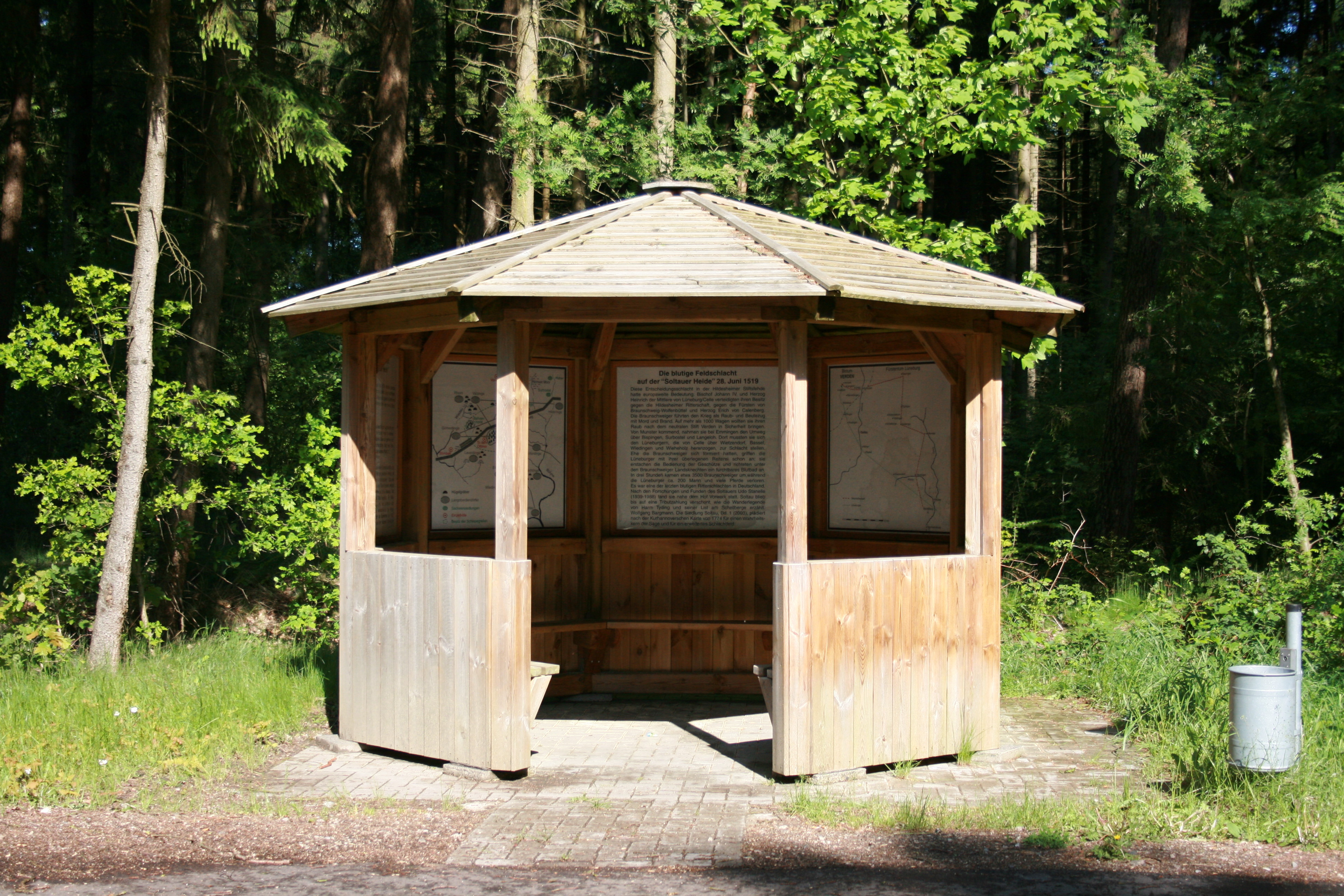
Information hut near the field of battle in Wiedingen

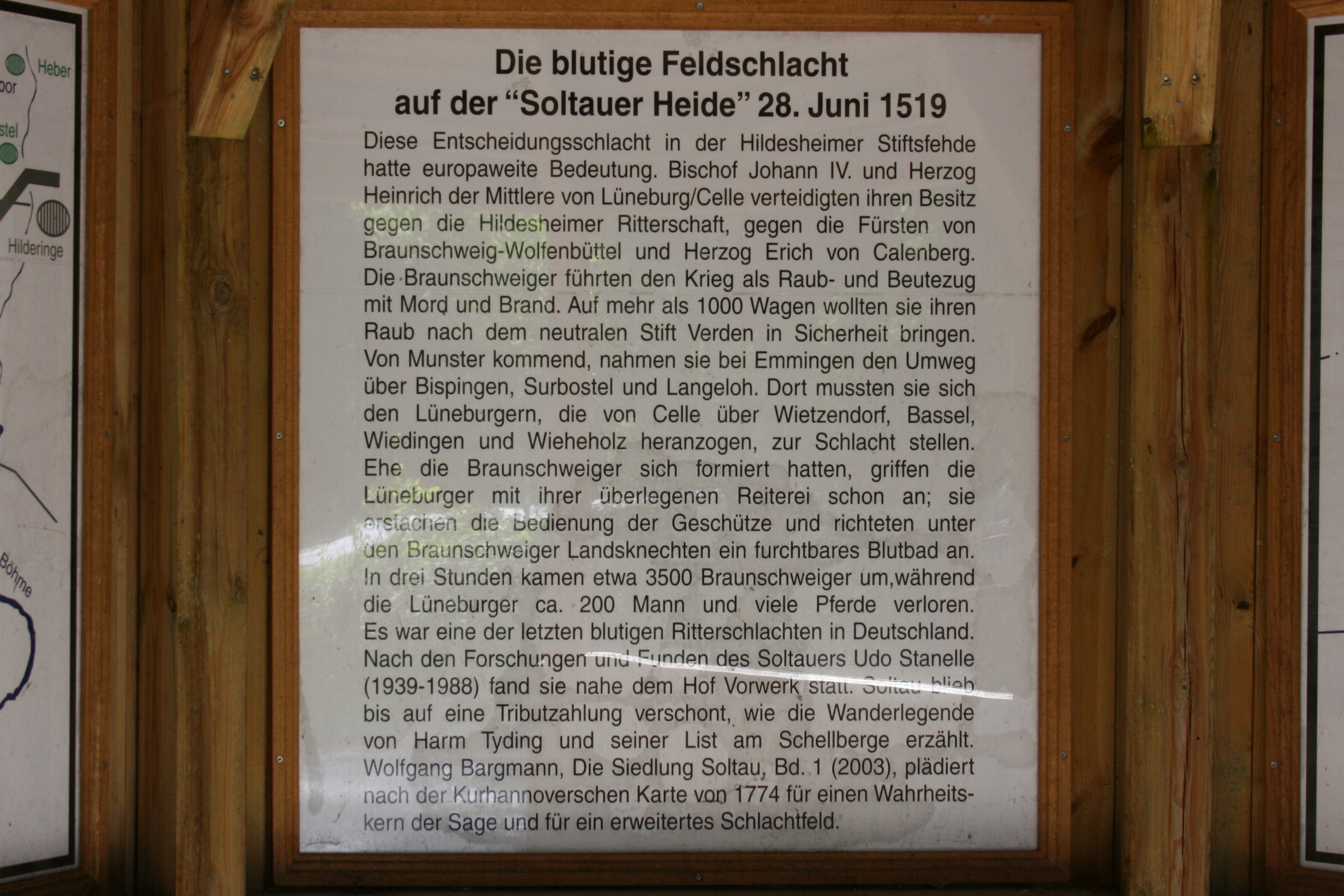
Information board

=== Opening clash ===
Oddly the battle was started by the Lüneburgers, although to begin with they only had their (albeit superior) cavalry at hand. According to the report by Henry the Middle three of his small Fähnlein of cavalry launched a frontal attack on the Brunswick horse. The fourth Lüneburg Fähnlein out-flanked the opposing body of cavalry and put it to flight headlong into the nearby Vahlzen Moor, where many of the routed horsemen lost their lives. The large Fähnlein (600 horse) had not been engaged in the battle to that point. What the Brunswick vanguard (of 1,500 Landsknechte) did during the cavalry battle is unclear. It must have been so far from its own cavalry that they could be out-flanked.

=== Attack on the Brunswick forlorn hope ===
Whilst a portion of the victorious squadrons pursued their fleeing enemy, Lüneburg's large Fähnlein of knights now attacked the isolated vanguard of their opponents, evidently supported again by an effective flanking move by the four small Fähnleins who conducted themselves very skillfully throughout. The Landknechte buckled under the shock attack of the Lüneberger cavalry, the artillerymen were cut down. As a result, the forlorn hope was shattered and routed into the Dickmoor. Because this moor was more boggy than the Vahlzen Moor, a much larger number of the routed troops lost their lives there. Now only the Brunswick main body and its rearguard remained in the field, when Lüneburg's foot soldiers finally arrived on the scene.

=== Attack on the Brunswick main body ===
The 4,500 man strong main body of the Brunswick force had apparently not left its hill. Yet despite their attackers having to advance uphill to engage it, the main body put up little resistance. This would hardly have been surprising in view of the fate of their comrades and the fact that the greater part of the main body consisted of unprofessional soldiers. It appears not to have been supported by the rearguard which may have already fled. The main body of the Brunswick army was engaged frontally by the superior Lüneburg infantry whilst enemy horsemen swarmed around its flanks. It was beaten back and fled like the vanguard before it. Had the rearguard at this stage still been in the field it would surely have been carried away with the rout of those in front of it. With that the battle itself was over. Occasional skirmishes went on into the night, the seizure of the richly laden Brunswick baggage train and its war chest being the main objective.

== Aftermath ==
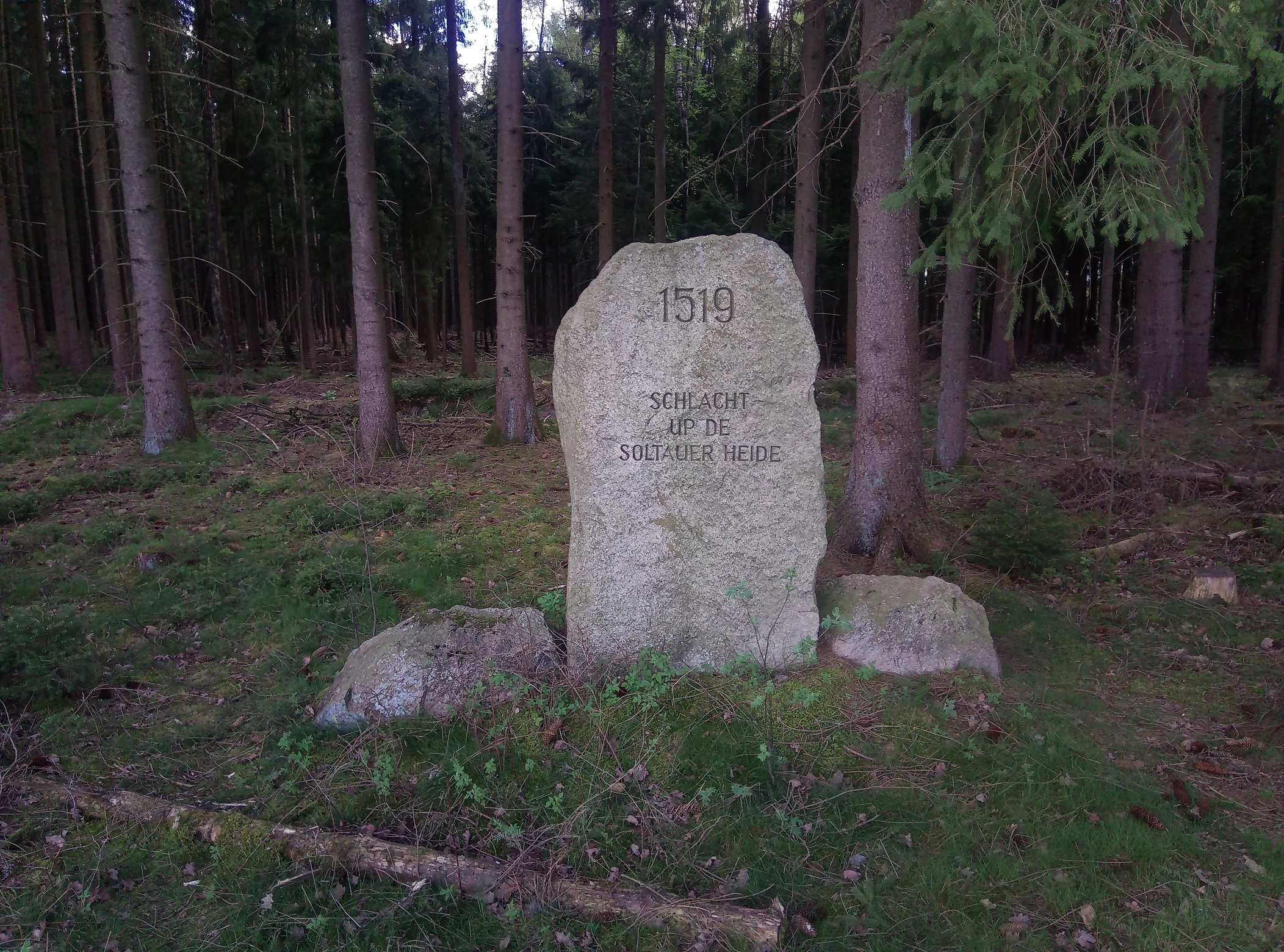
Memorial stone of the battle of Soltau

The defeated Brunswick army probably lost around 3,000 to 3,500 killed, most of them drowned in the marshes, as well as numerous prisoners (including Duke Eric I of Calenberg and William, Count of Wunstorf and Regenstein). Some 136 noblemen and 400 knight's chargers were also captured, along with the silver, tableware, and garments of the Brunswick dukes and the war chest with 10,000 Gulden. The victors, by contrast, only suffered light casualties. Reports vary between 10 and 200 dead. The first figure (10) is hardly believable, even if the favourable circumstances for the Lüneburg forces are taken into account. No figures are given for the wounded, although these usually greatly exceeded the number killed. The report of 3,000 to 3,500 dead on the Brunswick side is clearly estimated and is probably based on the number of remaining troops that gathered again after the battle. The nobility of both sides complained about the high number of horses lost in the battle. This could be due to the fact that the cavalry at Soltau did most of the work (which in the case of the Lüneburgers at least affected the first half of the battle). It is also quite feasible that the miry terrain led to the demise of many of the horses.

=== Uncertainties ===
The course of the battle is difficult to fully reconcile from the few reports. For example, it is unclear why the Lüneburg infantry dropped behind on the march, what the role of the Brunswick artillery was, how the cavalry could play the deciding role on marshy terrain and, in particular, how the Lüneburg forces were able to so easily out-flank first the enemy cavalry and then its vanguard as well.

It remains striking that the tactical advantage was on the side of the Lüneburg army from the start. It must have been the decisions of the respective leaders that created this situation. Who made these decisions and when, remains unknown. The opening engagement of the cavalry can only have taken place in the manner described if the Brunswick horsemen had charged their opponents. Otherwise it remains puzzling how the forlorn hope lost contact with its own cavalry, a factor which in the end led to the downfall of both forces.

=== Consequences ===
Eric of Calenburg was captured, but later freed on payment of a considerable ransom to Bishop John and the surrender of various castles. Henry the Younger escaped to Rothenburg Castle. Although Henry the Middle and Bishop John IV were able to take control of the regional situation for a time through their victory at Soltau, the wider political direction of the empire took a different turn. After Charles from the House of Habsburg had been elected as the new emperor, the defeated party made various attempts to show that the victors of Soltau had been in the wrong. Because the latter had supported Francis I of France, the reaction of Charles V was unsurprising. In the end the Lüneburg-Hildesheim party had to acquiesce to significant material forfeitures at the Quedlinburg Recess of 1523. The victor of Soltau, Henry the Middle, was placed under an imperial ban and by 1520 had to seek exile in France. In 1530 Charles V lifted the ban and Duke Henry was able to spend his last years at Wienhausen near Celle where he died in 1532. Bishop John was also banned and later resigned from office.
