= Wiedingen =

Village in Soltau, Lower Saxony, Germany

Coordinates: 53°00′N 9°47′E

Wiedingen is a village in the borough of Soltau in the district of Soltau-Fallingbostel in the German state of Lower Saxony. The village has 142 inhabitants (as at: 2003). The hamlets of Ellingen and Wieheholz belong to the municipality of Wiedingen.

== Location ==
Wiedingen lies on the Lüneburg Heath northwest of Soltau on the River Soltau. The B 71 federal highway and the Soltau–Neuenkirchen railway run through Wiedingen.

== History ==
- The Battle of Soltau, the last known cavalry battle, took place on 28 June 1519 near Wiedingen.
- In Wiedingen is an old defensive wall (landwehr) known as the Wall to dem Wieholte.
- The Low Saxon name is Wiegen.

== Current ==
- The television series Die Kinder vom Alstertal was shot, from the third episode, on the Menkenhof in Wiedingen.
- The chair of the parish council is Wilhelm Cassebaum (as at 2008).

== Gallery ==
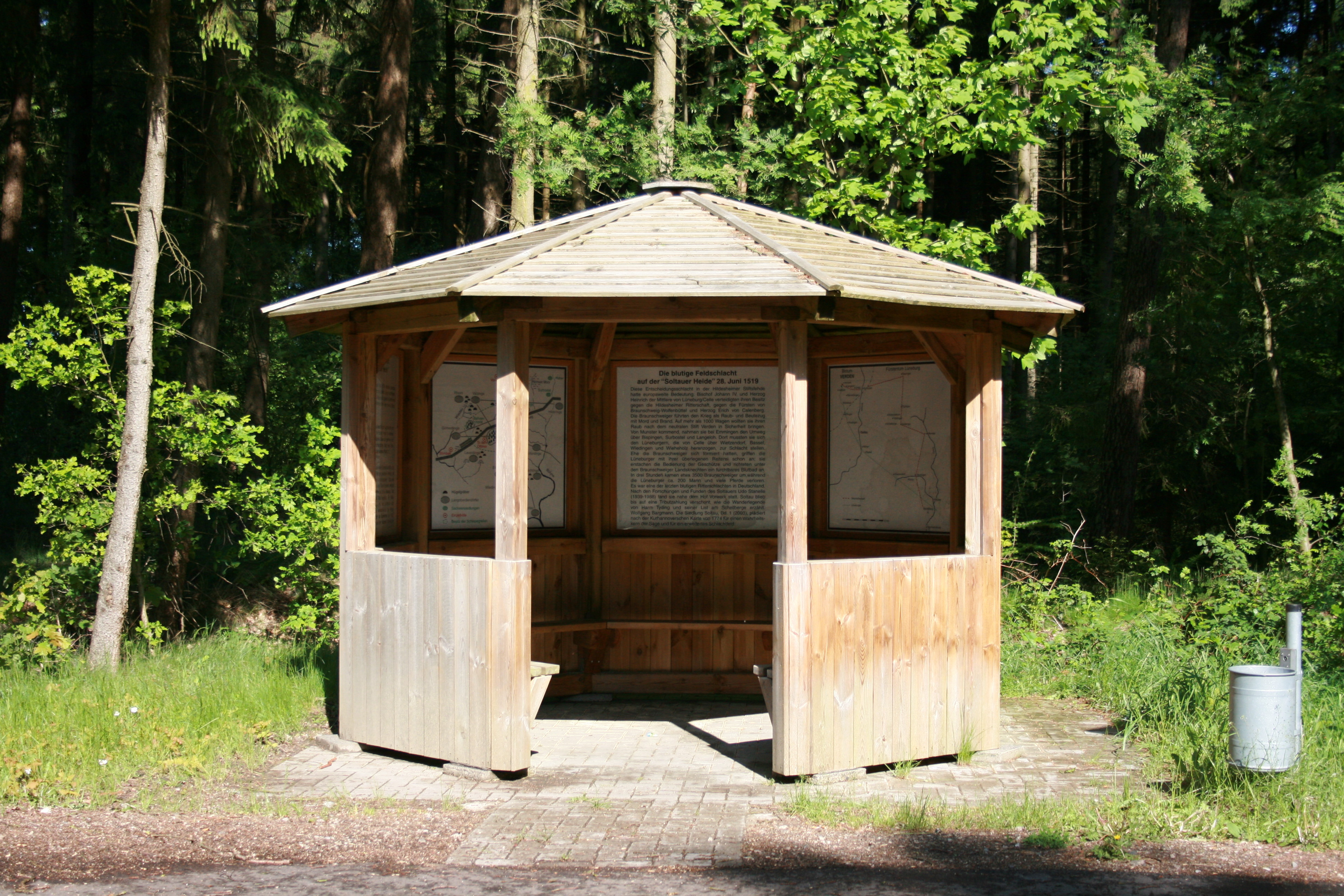
Information hut on the Battle of Soltau

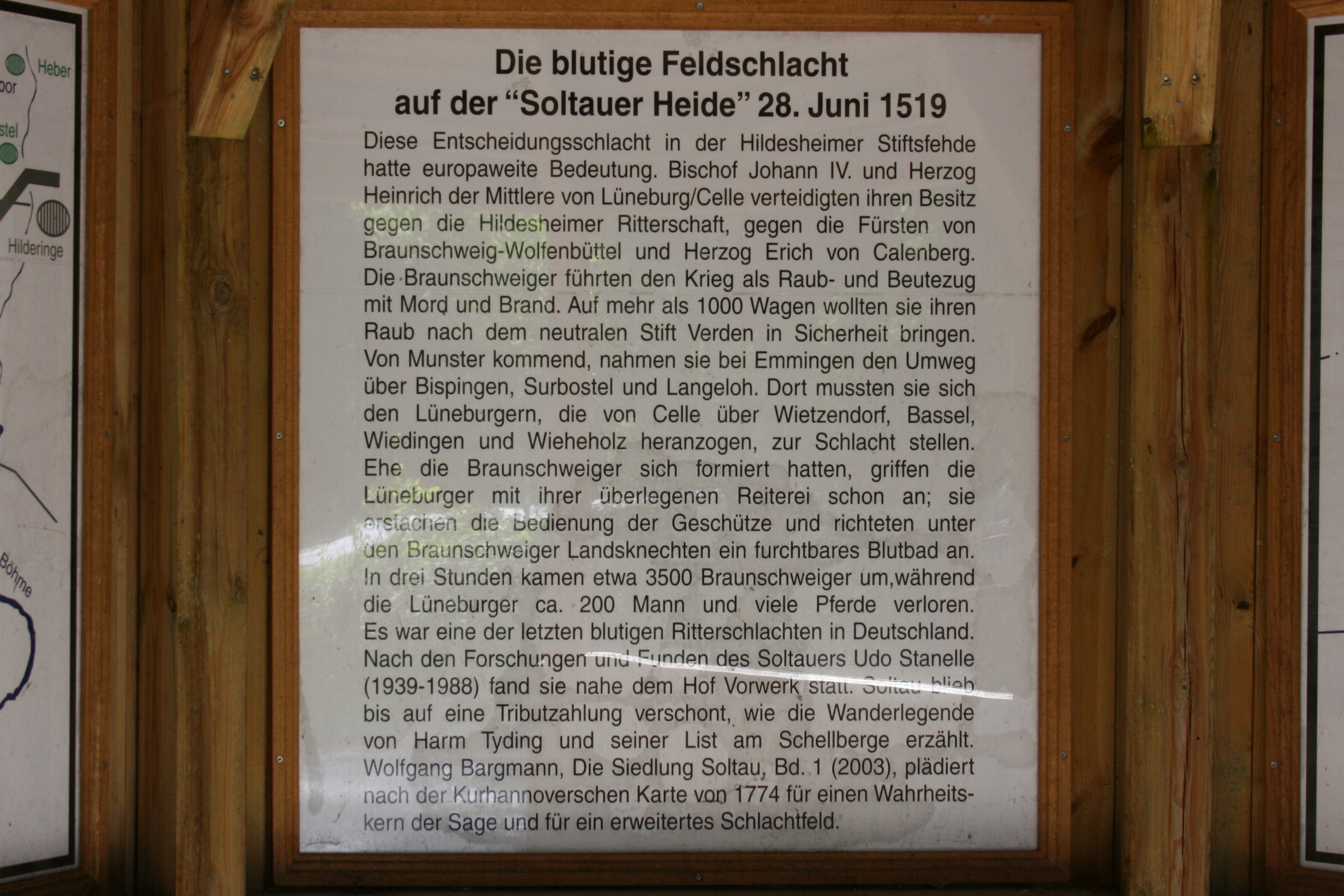
Information board

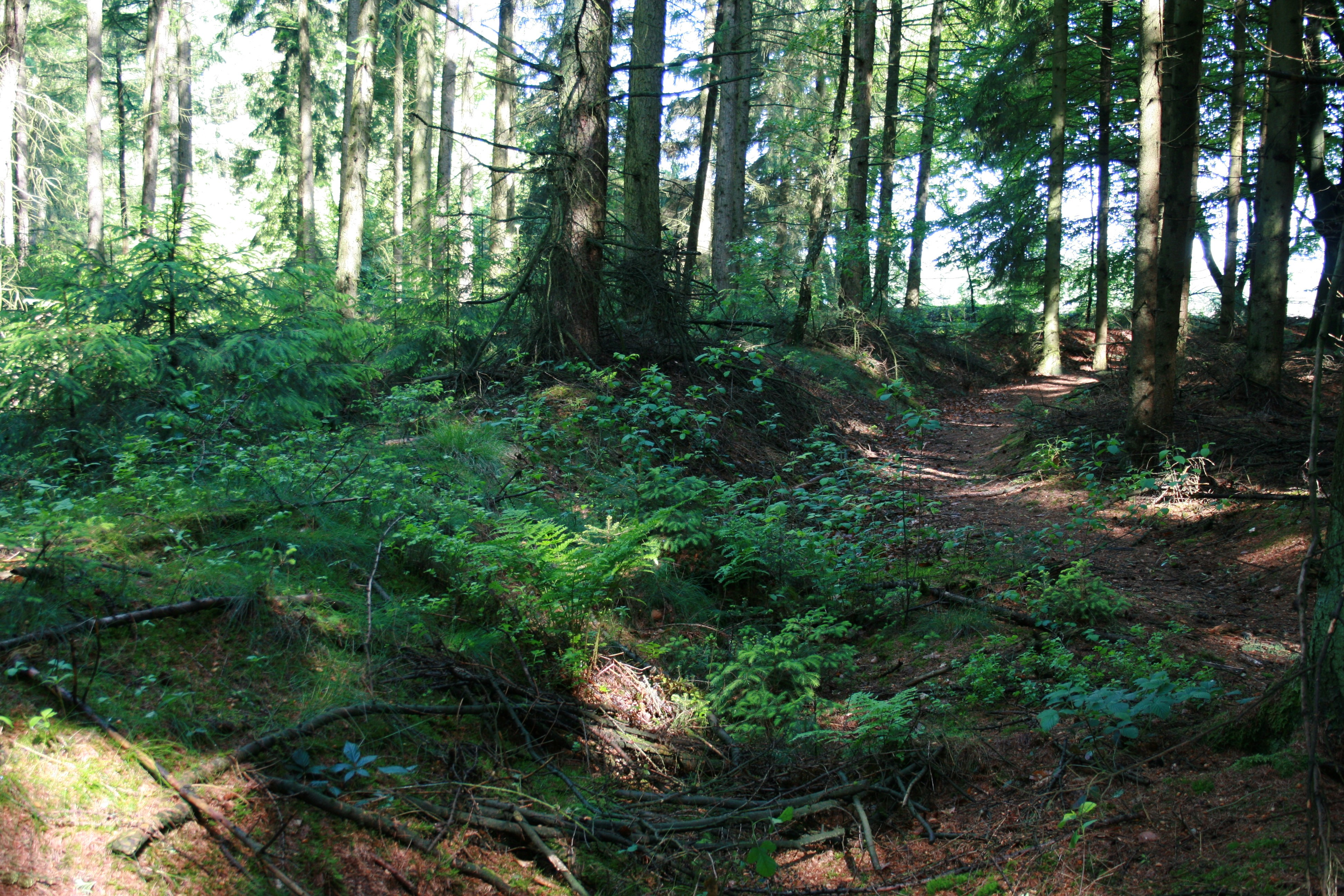
The Landwehr in Wieheholz

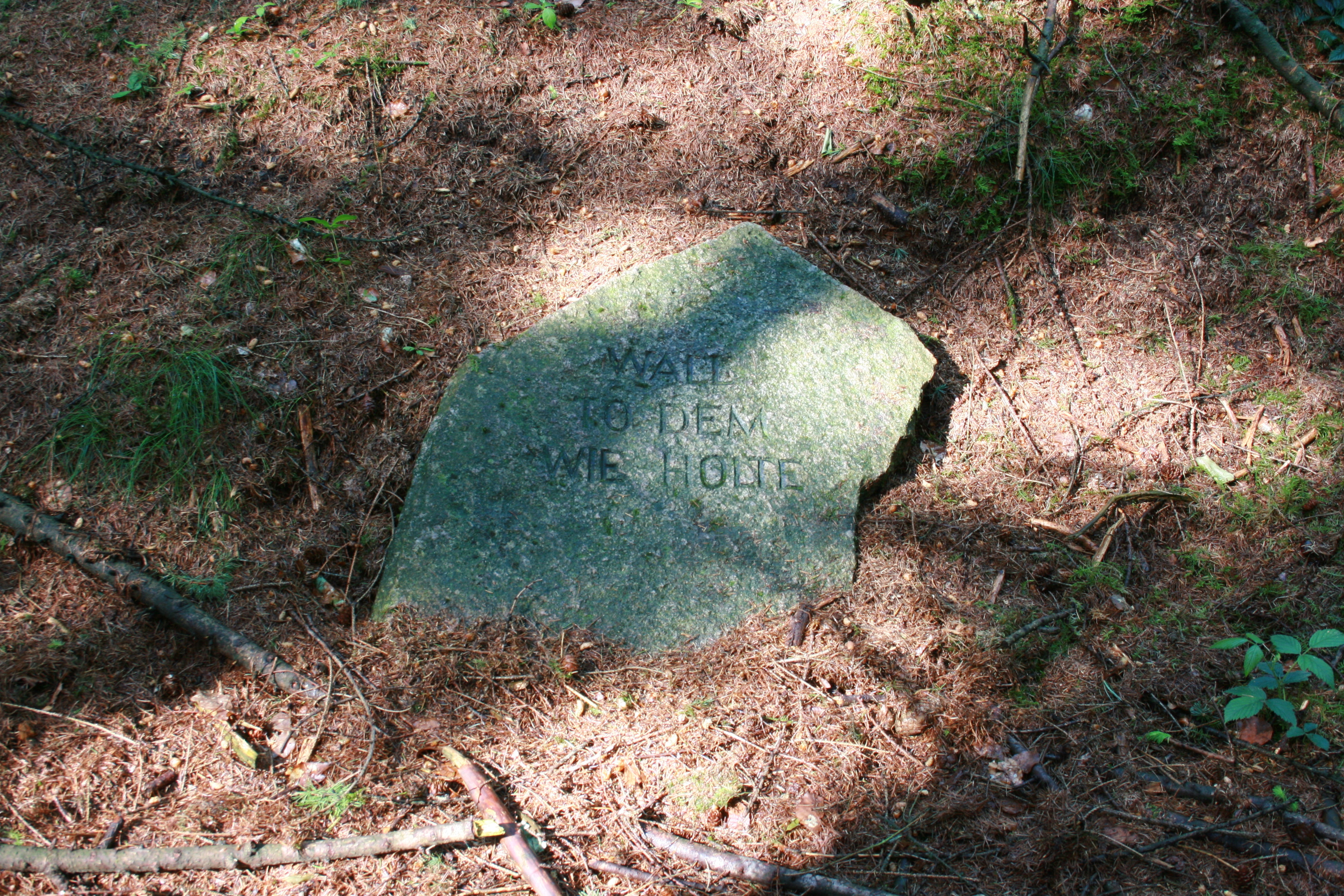
Memorial stone

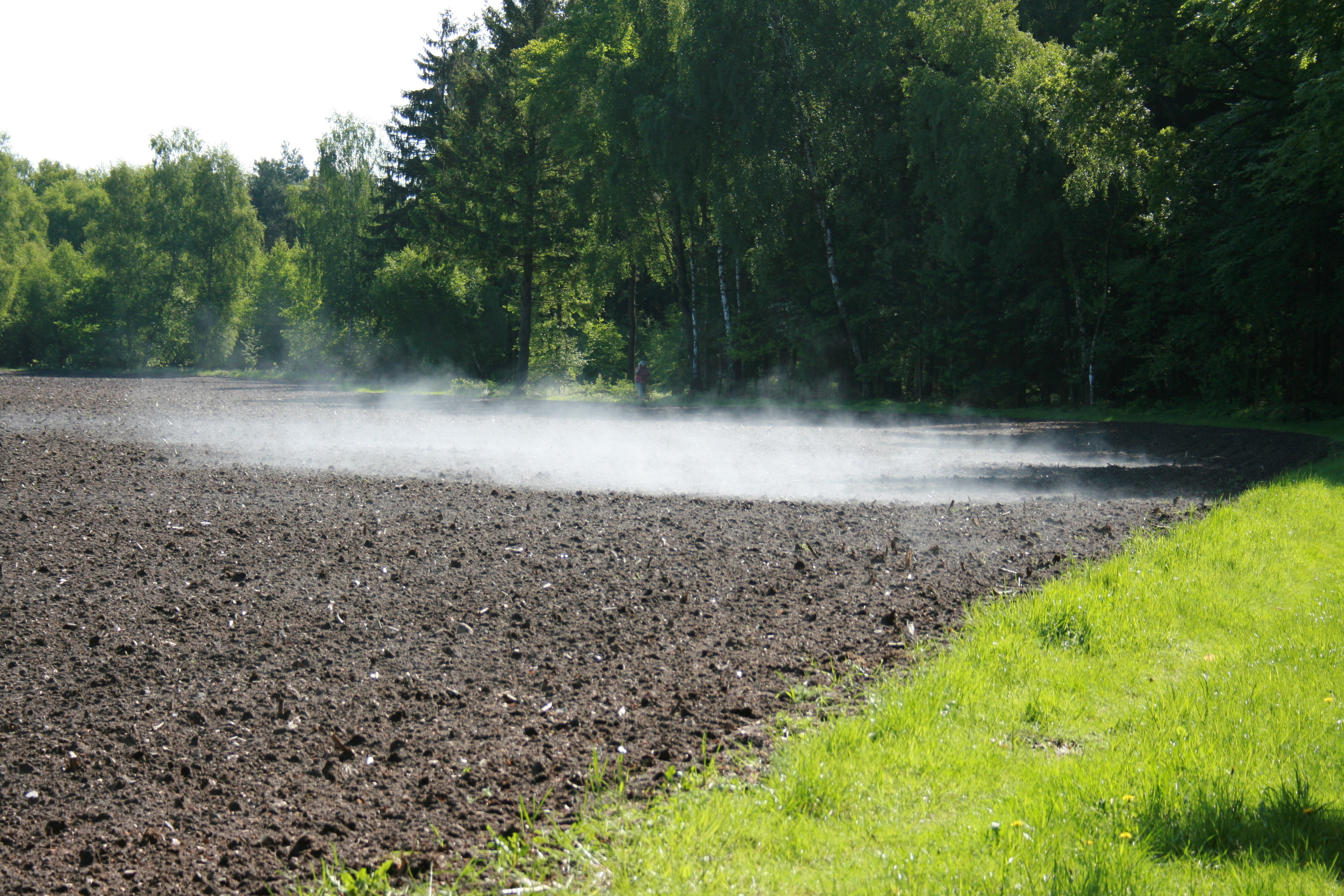
Agriculture in Wiedingen
