= Philip II of Brunswick-Grubenhagen =

Philip II
- Duke of Brunswick-Lüneburg

Prince of Grubenhagen
- Reign: 1595–1596
- Predecessor: Wolfgang
- Successor: none
- Born: 2 May 1533
- Died: 4 April 1596 (aged 62)
- Burial: St. Giles Church in Osterode
- Spouse: Clara of Brunswick-Wolfenbüttel
- House: House of Welf
- Father: Philip I, Duke of Brunswick-Grubenhagen
- Mother: Catherine of Mansfeld

Philip II (2 May 1533 – 4 April 1596), Duke of Brunswick-Lüneburg, a member of the House of Welf, was the last ruler of the Principality of Grubenhagen from 1595 until his death. When he died in 1596, the Grubenhagen branch of the Welfs became extinct, whereafter the principality was occupied by Duke Henry Julius of Brunswick-Wolfenbüttel.

== Life ==
Philip II was one of the many children of his father Duke Philip I of Brunswick-Grubenhagen and his wife Catherine of Mansfeld (1501–1535). Philip II was the youngest of nine siblings, six of whom reached adulthood. After Duke Philip I's death in 1551, he was first succeeded in government by his eldest son Ernest III. After Ernest's death in 1567, his brother Wolfgang succeeded. When he too died without male descendants in 1595, Philip II succeeded.

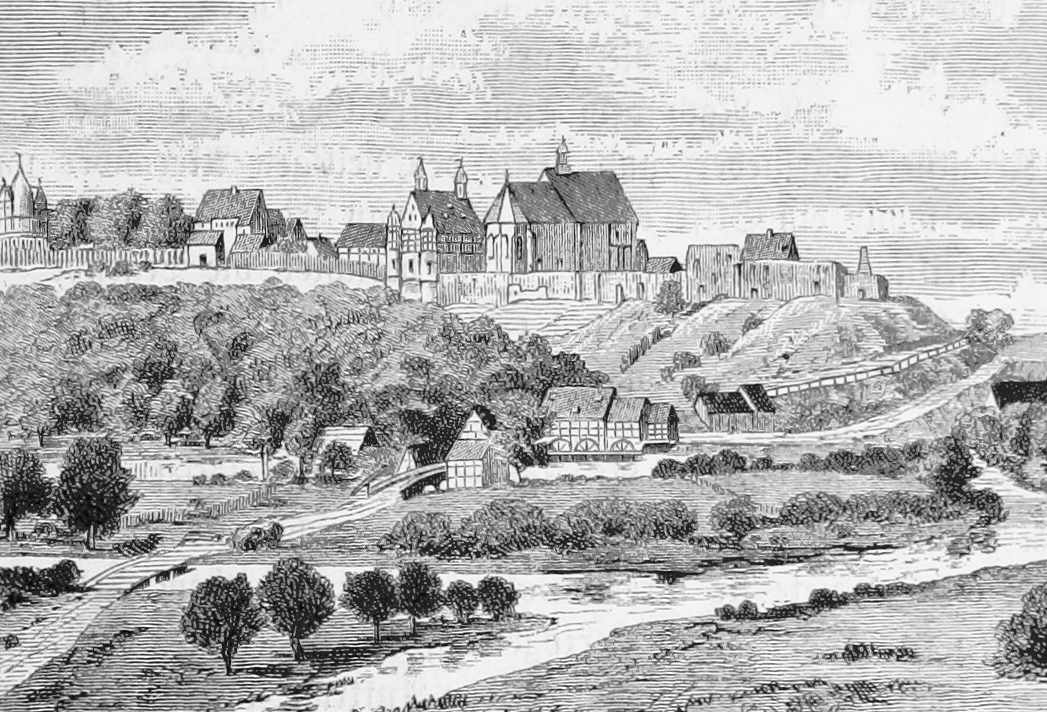
Katlenburg Castle, Merian, 1654

Duke Philip II was married to his cousin Clara of Brunswick-Wolfenbüttel (1532–1595), designated Abbess of Gandersheim, who had renounced her ecclesiastical office after the abbey had been occupied by Schmalkaldic troops in the course of the Protestant Reformation and plundered afterwards. The couple took residence at the secularised monastery of Katlenburg, which Philip II had rebuilt in a Renaissance style.

In 1595 Duke Philipp II moved his residence from Katlenburg to Herzberg Castle. He reigned less than one year. When he died without a male heir in 1596, the Grubenhagen side-line of the Welfs died out and the Principality of Grubenhagen was annexed by his cousin Henry Julius of Brunswick-Wolfenbüttel. However, the Lüneburg branch of the Welf dynasty objected to the annexation and took the matter to the Reichskammergericht. In 1617, after a prolonged legal case, Henry Julius's son Frederick Ulrich had to cede the former Principality of Grubenhagen to Duke Christian of Brunswick-Lüneburg.

Duke Philip's final resting place is next to his parents and brothers in the crypt of St. Giles Church in Osterode am Harz. His wife Clara died in 1595.

== Ancestors ==
Ancestors of Philip II of Brunswick-Grubenhagen

8. Eric I, Duke of Brunswick-Grubenhagen
4. Albert II, Duke of Brunswick-Grubenhagen
9. Elisabeth of Brunswick-Göttingen
2. Philip I, Duke of Brunswick-Grubenhagen
10. Wolrad I, Count of Waldeck
5. Elisabeth of Waldeck
11. Barbara of Wertheim
1.Philip II, Duke of Brunswick-Grubenhagen
12. Albert V, Count of Mansfeld-Vorderort
6. Ernest II, Count of Mansfeld-Vorderort
13. Susanna of Bickenbach
3. Catherine of Mansfeld-Vorderort
14. Bruno VI of Querfurt
7. Barbara of Querfurt
15. Brigitte of Stolberg

Philip II of Brunswick-Grubenhagen House of Welf Born: 2 May 1533 Died: 4 April 1596
Preceded by Wolfgang	Duke of Brunswick-Lüneburg; Prince of Grubenhagen; 1595–1596	Succeeded by Principality occupied by Henry Julius of Brunswick-Wolfenbüttel
