= Herzberg (surname) =

Herzberg is a German surname originating in Germany meaning "heart mountain". Notable people with the surname include:

- Agnes M. Herzberg (1938–2026), Canadian statistician
- Frederick Herzberg (1923–2000), American psychologist
- Elaine Herzberg, killed as a pedestrian via an autonomous car
- Gary Allan Herzberg, American country singer who goes by stage name Gary Allan
- Gerhard Herzberg (1904–1999), German-Canadian physicist and physical chemist
- Peter Herzberg, American politician from Michigan
