= Hildesheim Diocesan Feud =

Conflict

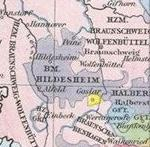
The prince-bishopric around 1500 (before the feud)

The Hildesheim Diocesan Feud (German: Hildesheimer Stiftsfehde) or Great Diocesan Feud, sometimes referred to as a "chapter feud", was a conflict that broke out in 1519 between the Prince-Bishopric of Hildesheim (Hochstift Hildesheim) and the principalities of Brunswick-Wolfenbüttel and Calenberg that were ruled by the House of Welf. Originally just a local conflict between the Hildesheim prince-bishop John IV of Saxe-Lauenburg and his own prince-bishopric's nobility (Stiftsadel), it developed into a major dispute between various Lower Saxon territorial princes. The cause was the attempt by Prince-Bishop John to redeem the pledged estates and their tax revenue from the nobles in his temporalities, the prince-bishopric (Hochstift, or simply das Stift). The diocesan feud ended with the Treaty of Quedlinburg in 1523.

== Background ==
Due to his prince-bishopric's poor financial circumstances the Prince-Bishop of Hildesheim asked for the return of several estates pledged (or mortgaged) to the nobles within the prince-bishopric. As these estates were an important source of income, a small number of nobles and knights refused, however, to give up their mortgaged property to the prince-bishop. In parallel there were attempts by the House of Welf to redeem the land around Everstein pledged to the prince-bishopric that revealed differences between the Lüneburg line of the Welfs under Henry the Middle, the Welf lines in Brunswick-Wolfenbüttel, Calenberg and the Prince-Bishopric of Minden. To wit, in 1513, Henry the Middle received from Prince-Bishop John IV a large bill (Pfandsumme, i.e. pawned sum) for Everstein and thus set himself against the interests of the other Welf lines.

== Alliance between the Hildesheim nobility and Henry the Younger ==
Henry the Younger of Brunswick-Wolfenbüttel sought a reason to attack the neighbouring Prince-Bishopric of Hildesheim and found one in the disputes between the prince-bishop and the prince-bishopric nobility. As a result, in 1516 an alliance was formed between Henry the Younger and a small group of nobles from the prince-bishopric of Hildesheim. In 1519 the smouldering conflict flared up into open warfare which is often described as the "last medieval feud".

The alliance partners on the side of the Hildesheim prince-bishop were the town of Hildesheim, Henry the Middle of Lüneburg and the counts of Schaumburg, Diepholz, and Hoya.

On the opposing side were Henry the Younger (Principality of Brunswick-Wolfenbüttel), his brother, Prince-Bishop Francis of Minden (Prince-Bishopric of Minden), his uncle Eric of Calenberg (Principality of Calenberg), and a small group of nobles from the Hildesheim prince-bishopric around the knights of von Saldern.

== Battle of Soltau and escalation to imperial level ==
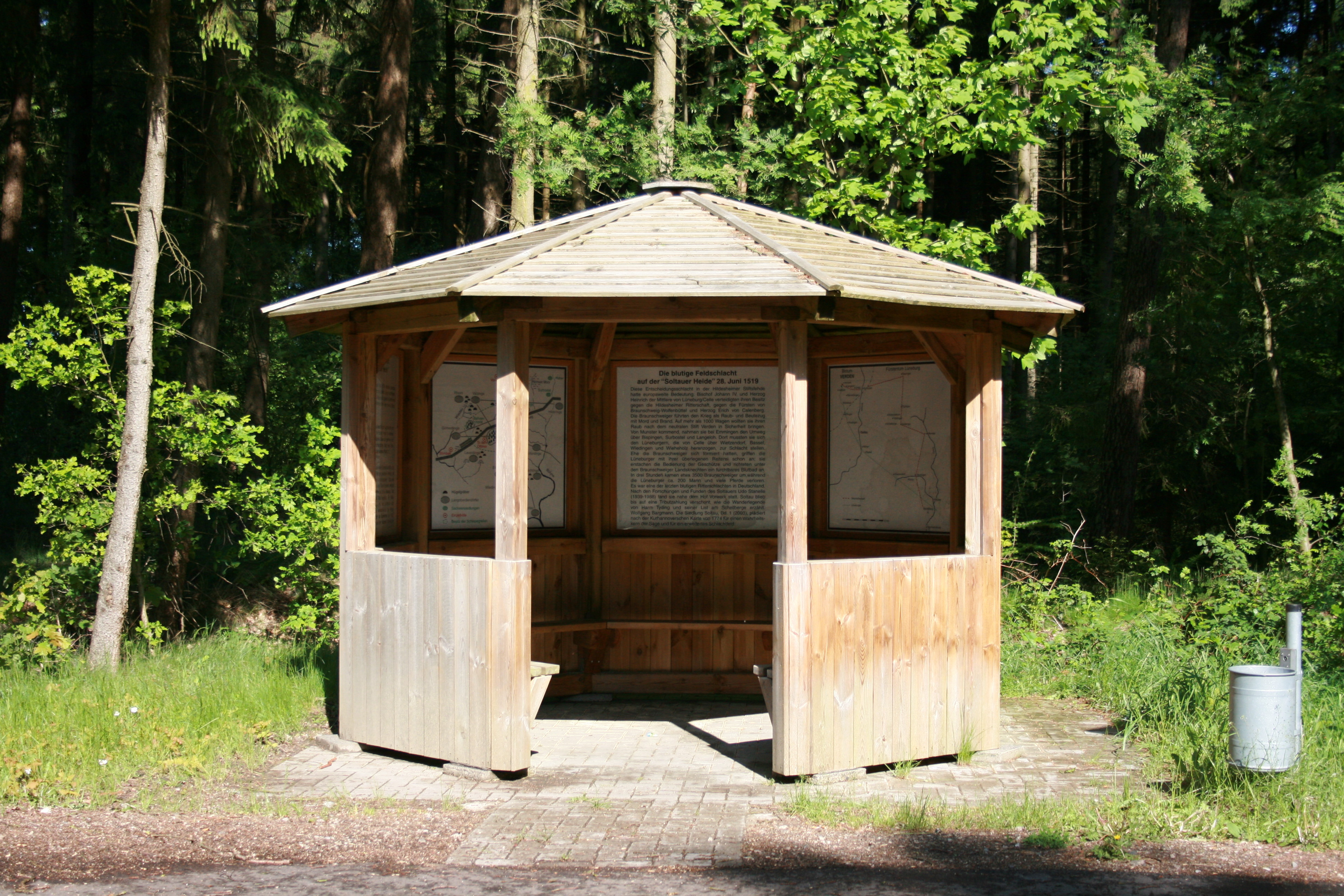
Information board near the battlefield site in Soltau-Wiedingen

Between 1519 and 1523 there was a succession of heavy battles and smaller skirmishes, in the course of which many towns and villages were devastated.

After futile sieges of the defences of Calenberg and Hildesheim by troops from Hildesheim or Brunswick, as well as numerous trails of devastation and plundering by both sides against the civilian population, the two sides finally met on 28 June 1519 at the Battle of Soltau (near the village of Langeloh). The Hildesheim army scored an emphatic victory against the Brunswick-Welf troops, killing some 3,500 men and capturing one of their leaders, Eric of Calenberg, as well as many of the nobles. This signalled the end of the opening phase of the war.

However, an appeal to the newly elected emperor, Charles V, who had a good relationship with Wolfenbüttel, saw the situation entirely reversed at a political level. The ruling imposed by Charles V provided for the surrender of all conquered territory and release of all the prisoners, and thus ruled very much against the Hildesheim side. Because it was ignored by the bishop and his allies, the emperor's decision was followed in 1522 by the imposition of an imperial ban, the execution of which was assigned to the princes of Wolfenbüttel and Calenberg. Whilst Henry of Lüneburg had already gone into exile in France in 1520 having transferred the reins of power to his sons and in doing so keeping the Principality of Lüneburg out of the subsequent conflict, there were renewed military clashes between the Hildesheim prince-bishop and his opponents that were not finally resolved (in favour of the Wolfenbüttel side) until the so-called 'field peace' (Feldfrieden) of 15 October 1521. Hildesheim had won militarily, but lost politically.

== Treaty of Quedlinburg ==
After long negotiations the territorial changes resulting from the conflict were firmly established at the Treaty of Quedlinburg (also known as the Quedlinburg Recess) of 13 May 1523. The main import of these changes were significant gains for the princes of Brunswick-Wolfenbüttel, whilst the Prince-Bishopric of Hildesheim was left with just 4 of its original 22 districts (Ämter) as well as the towns of Hildesheim and Peine, the so-called Kleines Stift ("small prince-bishopric") of some 90 villages. The ecclesiastical boundary of the diocese remained unchanged.

The Principality of Brunswick-Wolfenbüttel was awarded the Ämter of Winzenburg, Wohldenberg, Steinbrück, Lutter, Wohlenstein, Schladen, Liebenburg, Wiedelah, Vienenburg and Westerhof with the abbeys of Lamspringe, Heiningen, Dorstadt, Wöltingerode, Ringelheim and Riechenberg, as well as the towns of Alfeld, Bockenem, Lamspringe and Salzgitter.

The Principality of Calenberg received the houses, i.e.fortified seats, and Ämter of Hunnesrück with Markoldendorf, Aerzen, Lauenstein, Grohnde, Hallerburg, Poppenburg, Ruthe and Coldingen, the towns of Dassel, Bodenwerder, Gronau, Elze, Sarstedt, half of Hameln and the abbeys of Marienau, Escherde, Wittenburg, Wülfinghausen and Derneburg.

Hildesheim immediately began a legal fight for the return of its Großes Stift ("large prince-bishopric"). This finally ended in 1643 in the Main Treaty of Hildesheim (Hildesheimer Hauptrezess) with a revision of the Treaty of Quedlinburg and return of most of the territories. Exceptions were the Ämter of Aerzen, Grohnde, Coldingen-Lauenberg, Lutter am Barenberge, Westerhof and Lindau, which remained with the principalities of Calenberg and Brunswick-Wolfenbüttel.

Prince-bishop John IV gave up the prince-bishopric in 1527 and later became canon of the Diocese of Ratzeburg. He died in 1547 in Lübeck.

== Sources ==
- Christine van den Heuvel, Manfred von Boetticher (Hrsg.): Politik, Wirtschaft und Gesellschaft von der Reformation bis zum Beginn des 19. Jahrhunderts. Hahn, Hannover 1998, ISBN 3-7752-5901-5.
- Christian Heinrich Delius: Die Hildesheimische Stiftsfehde. Leipzig 1803.
- Stefan Brüdermann: Norddeutscher Hegemoniekampf (1491-1523), in: Die Braunschweigische Landesgeschichte. Jahrtausendrückblick einer Region. Appelhans, Braunschweig 2000, ISBN 3-930292-28-9.
- Helmut von Jan: Bischof, Stadt und Bürger. Aufsätze zur Geschichte Hildesheims. Bernward, Hildesheim 1985, ISBN 3-87065-375-2.
- Chorographia der Hildesheimer Stiftsfehde von Johannes Krabbe 1591, mehrfarbige Reproduktion, LGN, ISBN 978-3-89435-348-3.
