= Magda Herzberger =

Romanian-born American author, lecturer, composer and Holocaust survivor (1926–2021)

Magda Herzberger, (20 February 1926 – 23 April 2021) was a Romanian-born author, poet, lecturer, and composer. Herzberger was a survivor of the Auschwitz, Bremen, and Bergen-Belsen concentration camps. Her book Survival was an account of her early life, her time in the camps and eventual liberation, and her reunion with her mother.

== Early life ==
Herzberger was born in Northern Transylvania (now Cluj, Romania). She was an only child to her mother Serena Daszkal and her father Herman. Despite being an only child, she grew up in the company of many cousins. She lost 80% of her family in the German concentration camps, including her father, who was killed in Dachau. However, her mother was a Holocaust survivor. The two were eventually reunited after World War II. Serena Daszkal died in 1994 at the age of 93.

At the age of 18, Herzberger spent six weeks inside the Nazi concentration camp of Auschwitz. She was later transferred to Bremen to perform forced labor while the city was being bombed by the Allied troops. She was transferred again in March 1945 to Bergen-Belsen concentration camp. She was given the task of disposing of the bodies that would accumulate throughout the barracks. Collapsed from exhaustion, Herzberger was found barely alive among the corpses by a liberating British soldier.

In late 1945, she returned to her home town of Cluj. She completed her bachelor of science degree then started at King Ferdinand Medical School, where she met her husband. Due to fear of communist forces within the area, they decided to flee to Israel. However, their ship was captured by the British in the Aegean Sea. They were brought to Cyprus, and held in a prison camp until they were permitted to enter Israel in 1949.

== Literary works ==
Herzberger authored eight published books, in addition to collections of smaller works. She also composed numerous musical compositions such as "Seduction", "Requiem", and "Prayer".

- Survival – An autobiography detailing her experience of the Holocaust.
- The Waltz of the Shadows, Second Edition – A collection of poems arranged as an autobiography.
- If You Truly Love Me – These are a collection of romantic love poems dedicated to her husband.
- Devotional Poetry – A collection of religious prayer and poems.
- Dreamworld – A collection of short stories inspired by her dreams of the Holocaust.
- Tales of the Magic Forest – A collection of children's fairy tales.
- Transcript of Magda Herzberger 1980 Interview – Includes the transcripts from a series of interviews of Herzberger from the Wisconsin Historical Society.
- Midnight Musings – A collection of poems, with themes of fantasy and spiritual devotion.
- Songs of Life – A collection of poems of varying subjects.
- Surviving Hard Times – A book with life lessons about overcoming challenges.

== Personal life ==
Herzberger was married to Eugene Herzberger, a neurosurgeon who began his career in Israel. The couple lived in Israel for nine years until they immigrated into the United States. They had a son, Henry and a daughter, Monica, who illustrated Herzberger's books. The family lived in Monroe, Wisconsin, where Eugene Herzberger practised medicine for 20 years. Prior to Herzberger's death, they resided in Arizona.

She spent her time educating the public about her experiences and perspectives within the holocaust. In addition to creating her literary and musical compositions, she gave lectures about her life and faith.

Herzberger died in April 2021 at the age of 95.
