= Herzenberg =

Herzenberg is a surname. Notable people with the surname include:

- Caroline Herzenberg (born 1932), American physicist
- Elena Herzenberg (born 1979), German high jumper
- Leonard Herzenberg (1931–2013), American immunologist
- Leonore Herzenberg (born 1935), American immunologist
