= Joseph Hertzberg =

Russian writer and translator

- Born: Mogilev, Podolian Governorate; Russian Empire
- Died: 1870; Mogilev, Podolian Governorate; Russian Empire
- Occupations: Writer and translator
- Writing career
- Language: Hebrew

Joseph Hertzberg (Hebrew: יוסף הערצבערג; d. 1870) was a Russian Jewish writer and translator.

== Biography ==
Hertzberg was born in Mogilev in the Pale of Settlement at the beginning of the nineteenth century. There he received a sound education, and mastered the Russian, German, French, and English languages.

He contributed largely to Hebrew periodicals, and wrote a popular Hebrew translation of Jacques-Henri Bernardin de Saint-Pierre's Harmonie de la Nature, published in Vilna as Sefer sulem ha-teva (1850) with an approbation by Isaac Baer Levinsohn. Hertzberg also translated into Hebrew Moses Mendelssohn's Morgenstunden, oder Vorlesungen über das Dasein Gottes, Immanuel Kant's Critique of Pure Reason, Salomon Munk's Palestine, and some volumes of Heinrich Graetz's Geschichte der Juden. He left in manuscript a volume of poems entitled Alummat Yosef.
