= Principality of Grubenhagen =

Subdivision of the Duchy of Brunswick-Lüneburg from 1291 to 1617 AD

Principality of Grubenhagen Fürstentum Grubenhagen
- 1291–1596
- Coat of arms
- Status: Principality
- Capital: Einbeck, Herzberg from 1486
- Common languages: Eastphalian
- Historical era: Middle Ages
  - Henry the Admirable Prince of Grubenhagen: 1291
  - Joined Lower Saxon Circle: 1500
  - Line extinct, annexed by Wolfenbüttel: 1596
  - Ceded to Lüneburg: 1617
Preceded by	Succeeded by
Principality of Brunswick-Wolfenbüttel	Principality of Lüneburg

The Principality of Grubenhagen was a subdivision of the Duchy of Brunswick-Lüneburg, ruled by the Grubenhagen line of the House of Welf from 1291. It is also known as Brunswick-Grubenhagen. The principality fell to the Brunswick Principality of Lüneburg in 1617; from 1665 the territory was ruled by the Calenberg branch of the Welf dynasty.

== Geography ==
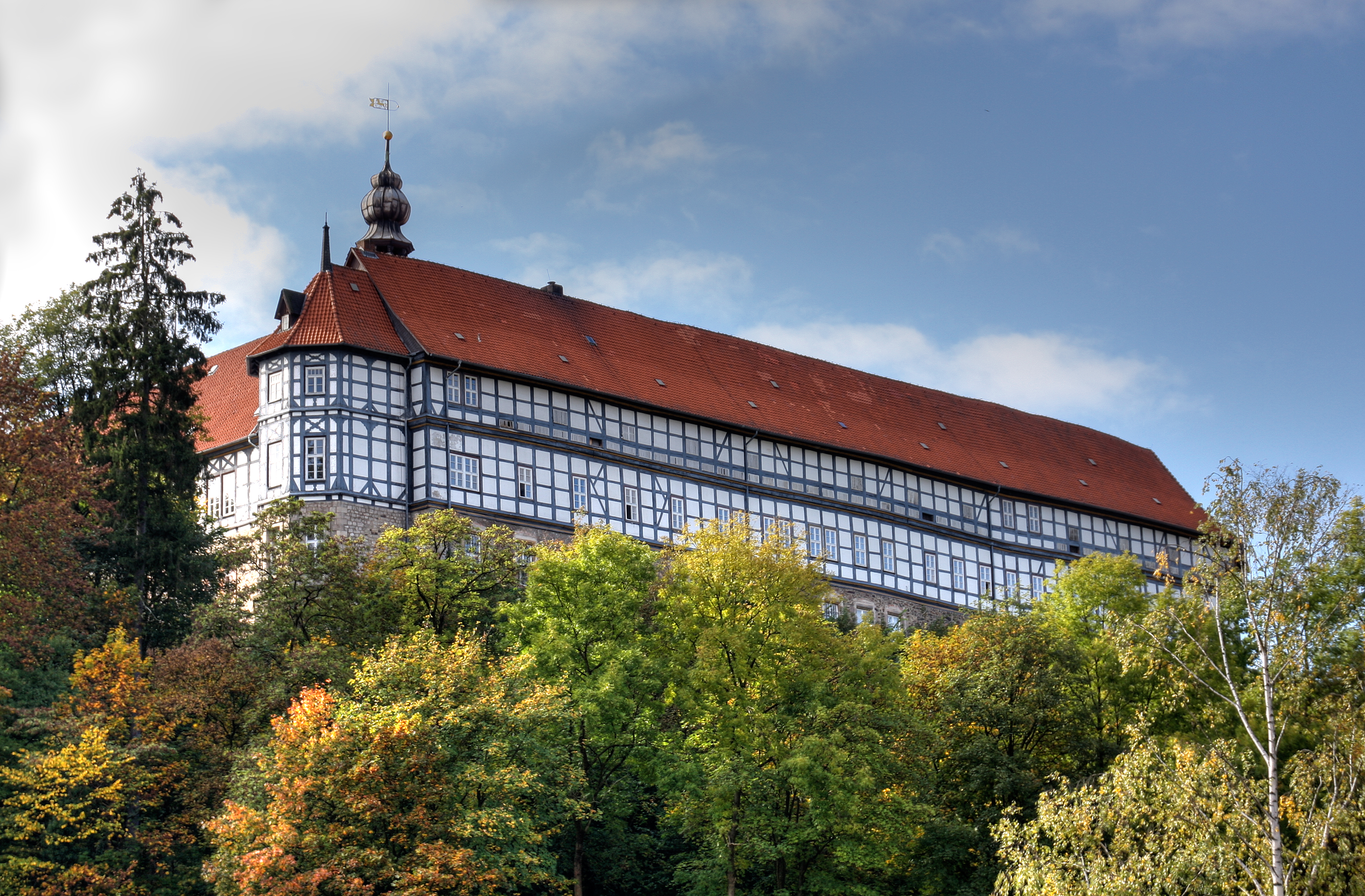
Herzberg Castle

The principality was located on the southwestern edge of the Harz mountain range in present-day South Lower Saxony. It included two separate territories, one around the town of Einbeck with Grubenhagen Castle, and another domain around the towns of Osterode and Duderstadt (ceded to Mainz in 1366) with Clausthal, Herzberg, and Herzberg Castle. The dominion also comprised the eastern exclave of Elbingerode, today part of Saxony-Anhalt.

== History ==
Grubenhagen was split off from the Brunswick Principality of Wolfenbüttel in 1291, when the sons of late Duke Albert the Tall (1236–1279) finally divided their heritage. Its first ruler was Duke Henry the Admirable. Henry's sons split the small principality further in 1322 as they themselves had numerous heirs; Otto, son of Duke Henry II, in view of his small share left for Montferrat, married Queen Joan I of Naples in 1376 and became Prince of Taranto in 1383. The ongoing fragmentation weakened the position of the Grubenhagen branch regarding estate distributions involving their Wolfenbüttel, Lüneburg and Calenberg cousins.

The Principality of Grubenhagen was finally reunited in 1526 under the rule of the Brunswick duke Philip I. However, in 1596 the Grubenhagen branch became extinct upon the death of his son Philip II. The territory was disputed by the different lines of the Welf dynasty: Duke Henry Julius, Prince of Wolfenbüttel, occupied Grubenhagen; his son Frederick Ulrich, however, had to cede it to Duke Christian, Prince of Lüneburg according to a 1617 ruling of the Imperial Chamber Court (Reichskammergericht) at Speyer.

With the Principality of Lüneburg, the Grubenhagen territory was finally inherited by Duke Christian Louis, Prince of Calenberg, in 1648. After his death in 1665 Grubenhagen ceased to exist as an independent principality. Formally, it remained a state of the Holy Roman Empire until its dissolution in 1806.

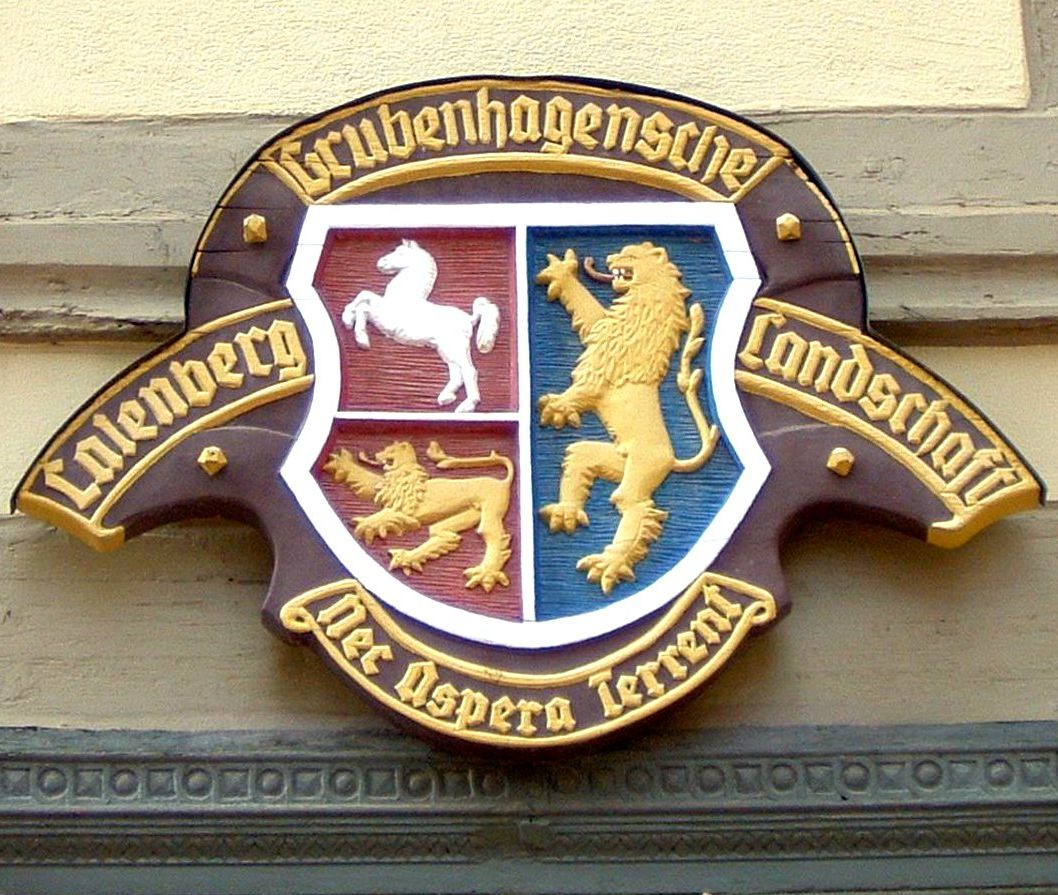
Coat of arms of the Calenberg-Grubenhagen Landschaft, photographed on a house in Göttingen

A Calenberg-Grubenhagen Landschaft (administrative division) still exists today.

== Princes of Brunswick-Grubenhagen ==
- Henry I the Admirable (1267–1322) ruled 1291-1322
- Henry II (Henry of Greece) (c. 1289–1351), son, ruled 1322-1351 jointly with his brothers
  - Ernest I (c. 1297–1361), co-ruler 1322-1361
  - William I (c. 1298–1360), co-ruler 1322-1360
  - John (cleric) (c. 1300–1367), co-ruler 1322-1325
- Albert I (c. 1339–1383), son of Ernest I, ruled 1361-1383, jointly with his brother John II
  - John II (c. 1340–1401), cleric, co-ruled 1361-1364
- Abbot Ernest (c. 1346–c. 1401), claimed co-regency 1383, alimony 1384
- Frederick (c. 1350–1421), guardian 1383–1398, senior 1402–1421
- Eric (c. 1383–1427), son of Albert I, ruled 1398-1427
- Henry III, son of Eric 1427-1464, jointly with his brothers Albert II and Ernest II
  - Albert II 1427-1485

Principality divided in 1479.

- Henry IV, son of Henry III 1479-1526
  - Philip I, son of Albert II 1486-1551

Grubenhagen re-united in 1526.

- Ernest III, son of Philip I 1551-1567
- Wolfgang, brother 1567-1595
- Philip II, brother 1595-1596
