= Herzberg am Harz =

- Town
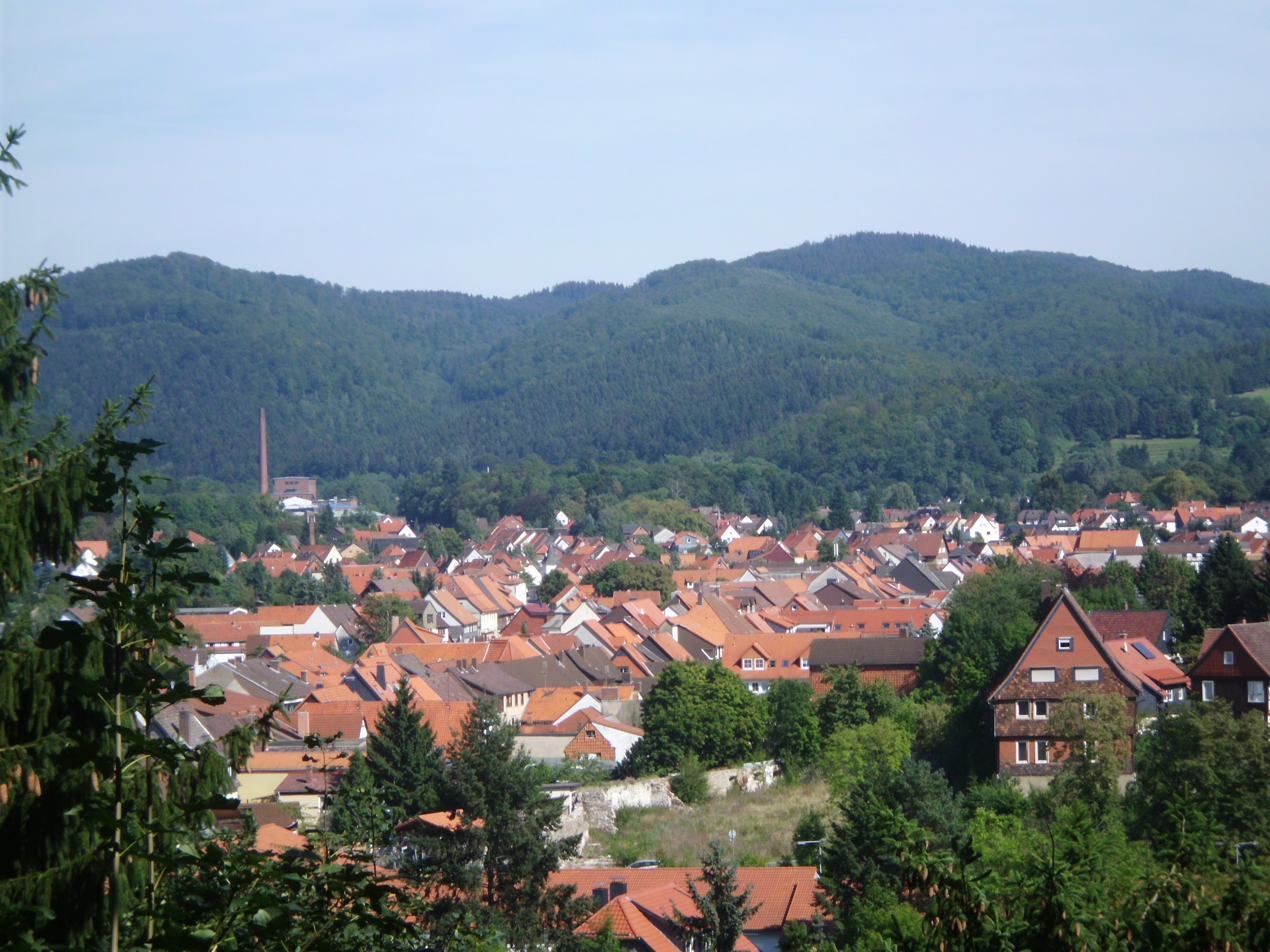
- View from the castle

- Flag Coat of arms

- Location of Herzberg am Harz within Göttingen district
- Interactive map of Herzberg am Harz
- Location within Germany Location within Lower Saxony
- Coordinates: 51°39′27″N 10°20′28″E
- Country: Germany
- State: Lower Saxony
- District: Göttingen
- Subdivisions: 6 districts

Government
  - Mayor (2021–26): Christopher Wagner (SPD)

Area
  - Total: 71.88 km^{2} (27.75 sq mi)
- Elevation: 240 m (790 ft)

Population (2025-12-31)
  - Total: 12,647
  - Density: 175.9/km^{2} (455.7/sq mi)
- Time zone: UTC+01:00 (CET)
  - Summer (DST): UTC+02:00 (CEST)
- Postal codes: 37412
- Dialling codes: 05521, 05585
- Vehicle registration: GÖ, OHA
- Website: www.herzberg.de

Herzberg am Harz (German pronunciation: [ˈhɛʁtsbɛʁk ʔam ˈhaːɐts], lit. 'Herzberg on the Harz'; Esperanto: Hercbergo-ĉe-Harco) is a town in the Göttingen district of Lower Saxony, Germany.

== Geography ==
Herzberg is situated on the southwestern rim of the Harz mountain range and the Harz National Park. Natural monuments in the surrounding area include the Unicorn Cave, the Karst Trail, and the Rhume Spring.

The town centre is located on the Sieber river, about 32 km (20 mi) northeast of Göttingen and 90 km (56 mi) southeast of the state capital Hanover. The municipal area comprises the villages of Lonau, Pöhlde, Scharzfeld, and Sieber.

== History ==
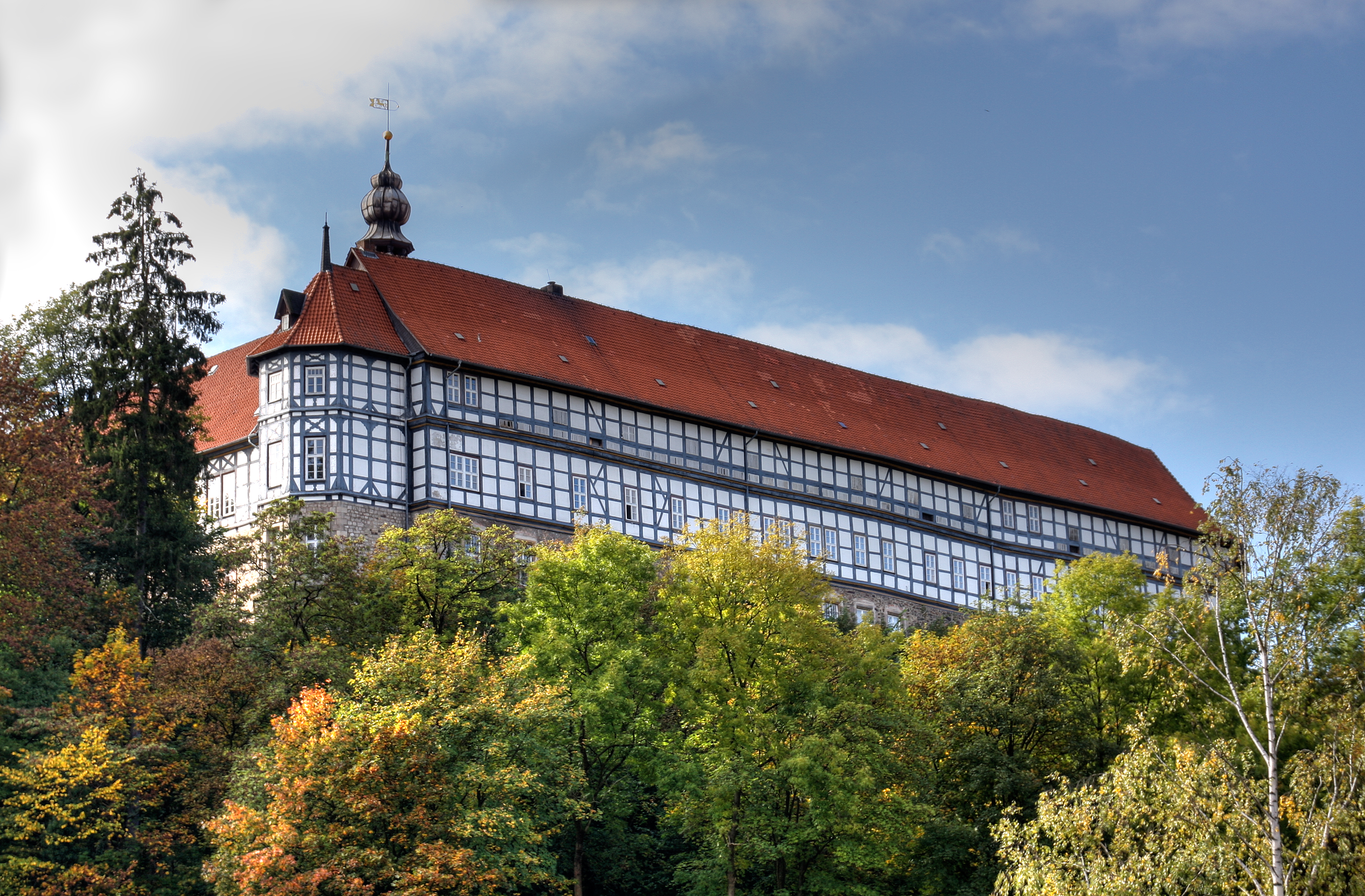
Herzberg Castle

Herzberg Castle in the Duchy of Saxony was first mentioned in an 1143 deed. A hunting lodge at the site was already erected from 1024 to 1029 by King Lothair II. It was seized by the Saxon Welf dynasty in 1144 and in 1158 became a property of Duke Henry the Lion with consent of the Hohenstaufen emperor Frederick Barbarossa.

The castle was part of the Grubenhagen estates of the Welf duke Henry I of Brunswick he received in 1291, when he and his brothers divided their heritage. A settlement below the castle was first documented in 1337. The Brunswick rulers of the Grubenhagen principality resided here from 1486 until the line became extinct in 1596. In 1617 Duke George of Brunswick-Lüneburg had his inheritance rights confirmed by Emperor Matthias and again lived at the castle with his wife Anne Eleonore of Hesse-Darmstadt until in 1636 he moved his residence to the Leineschloss in Hanover.

Herzberg first developed as a centre of cloth and linen manufacturing. In the 18th and 19th century important industries included brewing, the founding and turning of metal, agricultural machinery and boot making as well as arms production for the Hanover forces. Herzberg received town privileges in 1929, when it was part of the Prussian Province of Hanover.

== Herzberg is "Esperanto-urbo" ==
In 2006, the city council decided to advertise Herzberg as Esperanto-Stadt ("Esperanto city", Esperanto: Esperanto-urbo). In Esperanto, the city is called Hercbergo-ĉe-Harco or simply Hercbergo. Herzberg is also the location of a centre that promotes the international auxiliary language Esperanto, the Interkultura Centro Herzberg (Esperanto for "Intercultural Center of Herzberg").

== Politics ==
=== City council ===
Seats in the city council as of local elections on 11 September 2011:

- Social Democratic Party of Germany (SPD): 13
- Christian Democratic Union of Germany (CDU): 12
- Greens: 2
- Free Democratic Party (FDP): 1
- The Left: 1
- National Democratic Party of Germany (NPD): 1

Elections in 2016:

- LINKE (LEFT) = 1
- SPD = 12
- Greens = 2
- FDP = 2
- CDU = 10
- AfD = 3
- Total = 30

=== Twinning cities ===
Herzberg is twinned with:

- Góra, Poland, since 1993

== Economy and infrastructure ==
=== Resident companies ===
- Pleissner Guss GmbH
- Smurfit Kappa Herzberger Papierfabrik and Wellpappe (Production of paper and corrugated cardboard)
- Jungfer Druckerei und Verlag (Printing and publishing)
- PEMA GmbH (Truck rental)
- Kliniken Herzberg und Osterode GmbH (Clinic, also in Osterode)
- ANDIA International GmbH

=== Education ===
Primary schools:

- Mahnte-Grundschule
- Nicolai-Grundschule
- Einhornschule, Scharzfeld
- Grundschule am Rotenberg, Pöhlde

Secondary Schools:

- Ernst Moritz Arndt-Gymnasium
- Haupt- und Realschule Herzberg am Harz (Elementary and secondary school Herzberg am Harz)

== Notable people ==
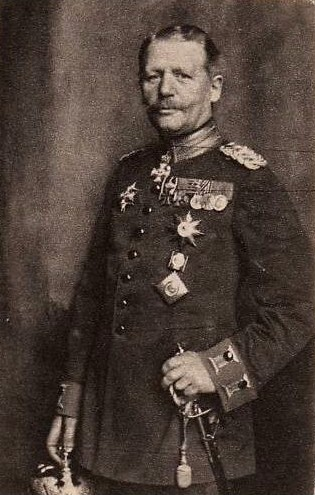
Karl von Einem, c. 1920s

- Ida Arenhold (1798–1863), social welfare pioneer.
- Ludwig Preiss (1811–1883), British botanist and zoologist, emigrated to Australia.
- Karl von Einem (1853–1934), Prussian colonel general
- Wolf Spillner (1936–2021), German nature photographer and writer
- Hanne Bergius (born 1947), art historian and Professor of Art History
- Lutz Bandekow (born 1948), Surgeon General of the Bundeswehr
- Eva Herman (born 1958), author and former TV presenter, brought up locally
- Wilfried Ließmann (born 1958), mineralogist and mining historian
- Tatjana Steinhauer (born 1991), water polo national team and European Championship participant

=== Aristocracy ===
- Christian Louis, Duke of Brunswick-Lüneburg (1622–1665), duke of Duchy of Brunswick-Lüneburg
- George William, Duke of Brunswick (1624–1705), duke of the principality of Lüneburg and Calenberg
- John Frederick, Duke of Brunswick (1625–1679), duke of the principality of Calenberg
- Sophie Amalie of Brunswick-Calenberg (1628–1685), Queen of Denmark and Norway
- Ernest Augustus, Elector of Brunswick-Lüneburg (1629–1698), first Prince-elector of Hanover
