= Henry I of Brunswick-Grubenhagen =

German nobleman; prince of Brunswick-Grubenhagen

Henry I the Admirable
- Duke of Brunswick-Lüneburg

Prince of Grubenhagen
- Reign: 1291–1322
- Successor: Henry II
- Born: August 1267
- Died: 7 September 1322; Salzderhelden (today part of Einbeck)
- Spouse: Agnes of Meissen
- Issue: Elizabeth; Otto; Albert; Adelaide; Facie; Agnes; Henry II; Frederick; Adelheid; Conrad; Mechtild; Ernest I William; Richardis; Margaret; John I
- House: Welf
- Father: Albert I, Duke of Brunswick-Lüneburg
- Mother: Adelheid of Montferrat

Henry I (August 1267 – 7 September 1322), Duke of Brunswick-Lüneburg, called the Admirable (German: Heinrich der Wunderliche, Latin: Henricus Mirabilis), a member of the House of Welf, was the first ruler of the Principality of Grubenhagen from 1291 until his death.

== Life ==
He was the eldest son of the Brunswick duke Albert the Tall and his second wife Adelaide, daughter of Margrave Boniface II of Montferrat. His father had ruled the Duchy of Brunswick-Lüneburg jointly with his brother John, until both divided their territory in 1269. Albert went on to rule the Principality of Wolfenbüttel until his death in 1279.

Henry first ruled the Brunswick principality of Wolfenbüttel jointly with his younger brothers Albert II the Fat and William. In 1291 they again divided the territory; Henry received the part that came to be known as Principality of Grubenhagen. It included the cities of Einbeck, half of Hamelin, Clausthal, Amelungsborn, Duderstadt, Herzberg, and Osterode. Henry quarreled with his brother Albert, who had received the Principality of Göttingen, over the remaining belittled areas around Brunswick and Wolfenbüttel, but Albert prevailed, and Henry retreated to Grubenhagen. He took Einbeck as his residence.

In 1320, Henry was appointed Count Palatine of Saxony by the emperor. He died in 1322, and his three surviving sons who had not joined the Church divided his territory among each other.

== Family ==
Henry married Agnes, daughter of Albert the Degenerate, Margrave of Meissen, in 1282. They had 16 children:

- Elizabeth (born c. 1282), married Frederick, Count of Beichlingen
- Otto (born c. 1283, died in or before 1309)
- Albert (born c. 1284, died after 1341), joined the Teutonic Order
- Adelaide (1285–1320), married King Henry I of Bohemia
- Facie (daughter; born c. 1286, died before or in 1312)
- Agnes, Abbess of Osterode (born c. 1287, died between 1332 and 1336)
- Henry (born c. 1289, died before or in 1351)
- Frederick (c. 1291 – c. 1323)
- Adelheid of Brunswick (c. 1293 – 17 August 1324), married Andronikos III Palaiologos, Roman Emperor
- Conrad (c. 1294 – c. 1320)
- Mechtild (c. 1295 – between 24 October 1333 and 14 March 1344), married John II of Werle
- Ernest (c. 1297 – 11 March 1361)
- William (c. 1298–1360)
- Richardis, Abbess of Osterode (born c. 1300, died between 1332 and 1336)
- Margaret (born c. 1300, died in or after 1312)
- John, (born before 1322, died 23 May 1367), provost at Einbeck

== Sources ==
- Lillich, Meredith P. (1982). Studies in Cistercian Art and Architecture. Vol. 3. Cistercian Publications.
- Braunschweigisches Biographisches Lexikon, Appelhans 2006, ISBN 3-937664-46-7
- At the House of Welf site

Henry I of Brunswick-Grubenhagen House of Welf Cadet branch of the House of Este Born: August 1267 Died: 7 September 1322
German nobility
Preceded by Albert I	Duke of Brunswick-Lüneburg; Princes of Wolfenbüttel joint reign with Albert II and William I 1277–1291	Succeeded by William I
Principality of Grubenhagen disentangled from the Principality of Wolfenbüttel	Duke of Brunswick and Lüneburg; Prince of Grubenhagen; 1291–1322	Succeeded by Ernest I and Henry II
