= Duchy of Brunswick-Lüneburg =

Principality of the Holy Roman Empire

Duchy of Brunswick-Lüneburg Herzogtum Braunschweig und Lüneburg (German)
- 1235–1806
- Coat of arms

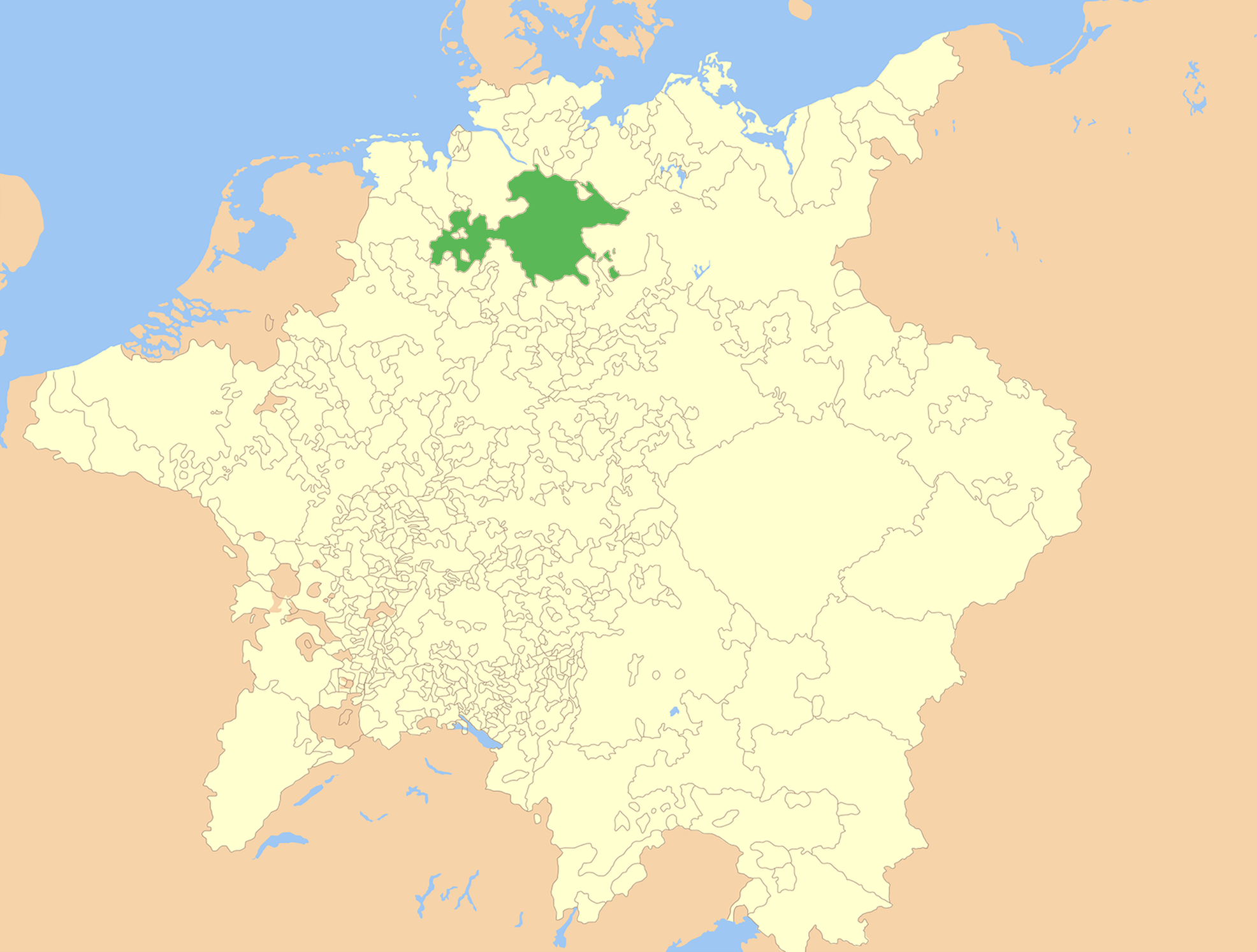
- Brunswick-Lüneburg in 1648
- Status: Duchy
- Capital: Brunswick
- Common languages: German
- Government: Monarchy
- Historical era: Middle Ages
  - Henry the Lion defeated; Saxony divided; Henry reinvested with Welf allod: 1180 1181
  - Allod elevated to Duchy of Brunswick and Lüneburg: 1235
  - Partition into Lünenburg and Brunswick: 1269
  - Grubenhagen formed: 1291
  - Göttingen formed: 1345
  - Brunswick splits into Wolfenbüttel and Calenberg: 1432
  - The end of the Holy Roman Empire: 1806

Area
- 1635: 21,170 km^{2} (8,170 sq mi)

Population
  - 1635: 525,000
- Currency: Goldgulden; Thaler; Pfennig
Preceded by	Succeeded by
Duchy of Saxony	Electorate of Hanover; Duchy of Brunswick
- Today part of: Germany

The Duchy of Brunswick and Lüneburg (German: Herzogtum Braunschweig und Lüneburg), commonly known as the Duchy of Brunswick-Lüneburg or Brunswick-Lüneburg, was an imperial principality of the Holy Roman Empire in the territory of present day Lower Saxony.

In 1235, Otto I was enfeoffed with the newly founded Duchy of Brunswick-Lüneburg at the Court of Mainz. It was based on the two castles in Brunswick and Lüneburg and the associated estate of the House of Welf. In 1269 there was a first division between the brothers Albrecht and Johann. The resulting principalities of Brunswick and Lüneburg together continued to form the Duchy of Brunswick-Lüneburg.

The history of the duchy and the constituent principalities was marked by further divisions and mergers of the principalities. The constituent principalities existed until the end of the Holy Roman Empire in 1806. At the Congress of Vienna, the Kingdom of Hanover and the Duchy of Brunswick were created as successor states. To this day, members of the House of Hanover call themselves Duke of Brunswick and Lüneburg.

== History ==
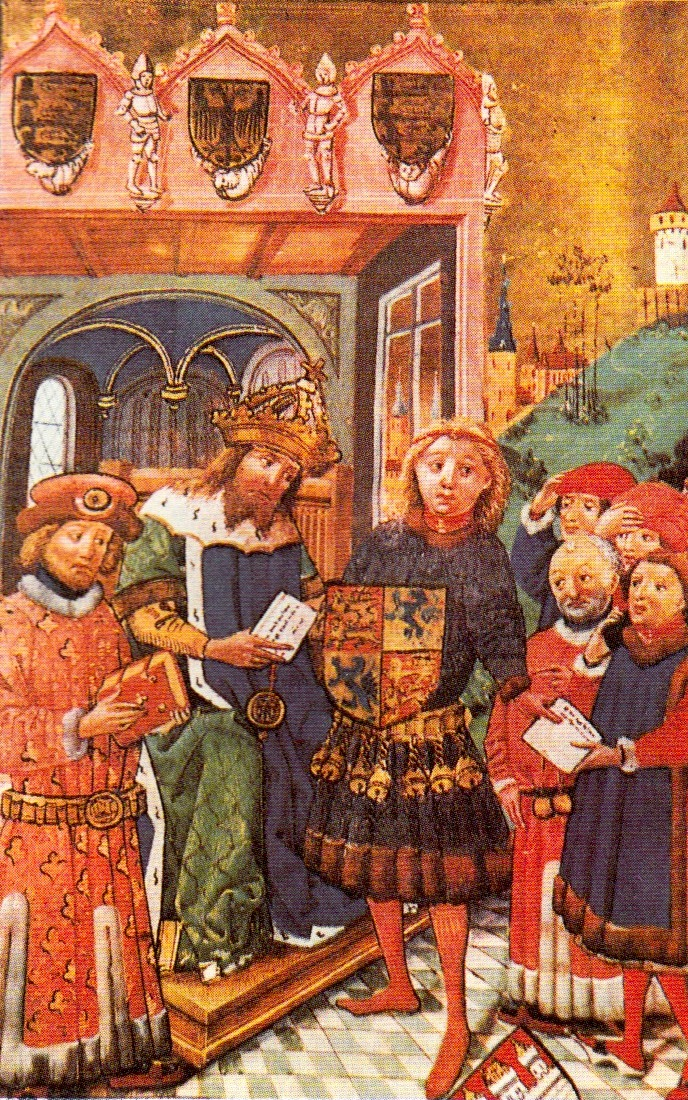
Otto the Child is enfeoffed with Brunswick-Lüneburg by Emperor Frederick II, Lüneburg Sachsenspiegel, 1448

When the Imperial ban was placed on Henry the Lion in 1180, he lost his titles as Duke of Saxony and Duke of Bavaria. He went into exile for several years, but was then allowed to stay on the (allodial) estates inherited from his mother's side until the end of his life.

At the Imperial Diet of 1235 in Mainz, as part of the reconciliation between the Hohenstaufen and Welf families, Henry's grandson, Otto the Child, transferred his estates to Emperor Frederick II and was enfeoffed in return with the newly created Duchy of Brunswick-Lüneburg, which was formed from the estates transferred to the Emperor as well as other large areas of the imperial fisc. After his death in 1252, he was succeeded by his sons, Albert the Tall and John, who ruled the dukedom jointly.

In 1269, the duchy was divided, Albert receiving the southern part of the state around Brunswick and John the northern territories in the area of Lüneburg. The towns of Lüneburg and Brunswick remained in the overall possession of the House of Welf until 1512 and 1671 respectively. In 1571 the Amt of Calvörde became an exclave of the Duchy. The various parts of the duchy were further divided and re-united over the centuries, all of them being ruled by the Welf or Guelph dynasty, who maintained close relations with one another—not infrequently by marrying cousins—a practice far more common than is the case today, even among the peasantry of the Holy Roman Empire, for the contemporary Salic inheritance laws encouraged the practice of retaining control of lands and benefits. The seats of power moved in the meantime from Brunswick and Lüneburg to Celle and Wolfenbüttel as the towns asserted their independence.

In the 18th century, a number of soldiers and officers from the duchy fought for the British in the American Revolutionary War, such as at the Battle of Bennington and Battles of Saratoga.

== History of the subordinate principalities ==
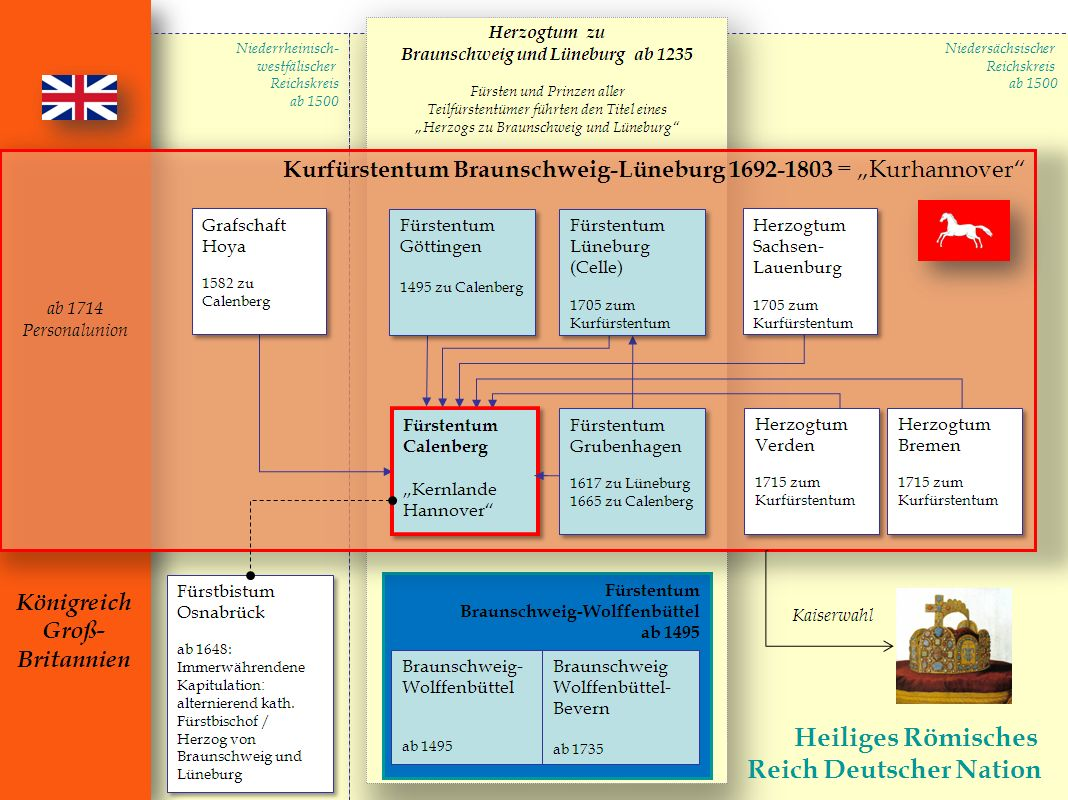
The Territorial division of the Electorate of Brunswick-Lüneburg and dynastic relationships within the Duchy of Brunswick-Lüneburg and to the Kingdom of Great Britain.

The subsequent history of the dukedom and its subordinate principalities was characterised by numerous divisions and reunifications. The subordinate states that were repeatedly created, and which had the legal status of principalities, were generally named after the residence of their rulers.

The estates of the different dynastic lines could be inherited by a side line when a particular family died out. For example, over the course of the centuries there were the Old, Middle and New Houses (or Lines) of Brunswick, and the Old, Middle and New Houses of Lüneburg. The number of simultaneously reigning dynastic lines varied from two to five.

=== Principality of Brunswick-Wolfenbüttel ===
In 1269, the Principality of Brunswick was formed following the first division of the Duchy of Brunswick-Lüneburg. In 1432, as a result of increasing tensions with the townsfolk of Brunswick, the Brunswick Line moved their Residenz to Wolfenbüttel, into the water castle, which was expanded into a Schloss, whilst the town was developed into a royal seat. The name Wolfenbüttel was given to this principality. From 1546, Wolfenbüttel became the residence of the senior prince of Brunswick-Lüneburg, Henry, Duke of Brunswick-Dannenberg.

With sole rights to the Duchy of Brunswick-Lüneburg, he provided a conditional sub-lease of the Principality of Lüneburg to the princes of Calenberg with the conditions of payment to the Wolfenbüttel heirs (Chief of the House), together with the guarantee that only his descendants would inherit this senior principality of Wolfenbüttel. Not until 1753/1754 was the Residenz moved back to Brunswick, into the newly built Brunswick Palace.

Following the Congress of Vienna and territorial adjustments the principality formed the basis of the new Duchy of Brunswick.

=== Principality of Calenberg (later Electorate of Hanover) ===
In 1432, the estates gained by the Principality of Brunswick-Wolfenbüttel between the Deister and Leine split away as the Principality of Calenberg. To the north, this new state bordered on the County of Hoya near Nienburg and extended from there in a narrow, winding strip southwards up the River Leine through Wunstorf and Hanover where it reached the Principality of Wolfenbüttel. In 1495, it was expanded around Göttingen. In 1584, it returned to the Wolfenbüttel Line.

In 1634, as a result of inheritance distributions, it went to the House of Lüneburg, before becoming an independent principality again in 1635, when it was given to George, younger brother of Prince Ernest II of Lüneburg, who chose Hanover as his Residenz. New territory was added in 1665 in the vicinity of Grubenhagen and in 1705 around the Principality of Lüneburg. In 1692, Duke Ernest Augustus from the Calenberg Line, acquired the right to be a prince-elector as the Prince-Elector of Brunswick-Lüneburg. Colloquially, the Electorate was also known as the Electorate of Hanover or as Kurhannover. In 1814, it was succeeded by the Kingdom of Hanover.

=== Principality of Lüneburg ===
The Principality of Lüneburg emerged alongside the Principality of Brunswick in 1269 when the inheritance of the Duchy was divided. After the death of Duke George William of Brunswick-Lüneburg in 1705, King George I inherited the state of Lüneburg, being both the benefactor of Georges William's 1658 renunciation in favour of his younger brother Ernest Augustus and the husband of the Duke's morganatic daughter, Sophie Dorothea, later known as the "Princess of Ahlden". It was united with the Principality of Calenberg, which had been elevated in 1692 into the Electorate.

=== Principality of Göttingen ===
The southernmost principality in the Duchy of Brunswick-Lüneburg stretched from Münden in the south down the River Weser to Holzminden. In the east it ran through Göttingen along the River Leine via Northeim to Einbeck. It emerged in 1345 as the result of a division of the Principality of Brunswick and was united in 1495 with Calenberg.

=== Principality of Grubenhagen ===
From 1291 to 1596, Grubenhagen was an independent principality, its first ruler being Henry the Admirable, son of Albert of Brunswick-Wolfenbüttel. The state lay along the northern part of the Solling hills and the River Leine near Einbeck and north of the Eichsfeld on and in the southwestern Harz. After being split in the course of the years into smaller and smaller principalities, Grubenhagen returned in 1596 to Brunswick-Wolfenbüttel and was ceded to the Calenberg line in 1665.

=== Other branches ===
Other branches that did not have full sovereignty included the states of Dannenberg, Harburg, Gifhorn, Bevern, Osterode, Herzberg, Salzderhelden, and Einbeck.

While a total of about a dozen subdivisions that existed, some were only dynastic and not recognised as states of the Empire, which at one time had over 1500 such legally recognized entities. In the List of Reichstag participants (1792), the following four subdivisions of Brunswick-Lüneburg had recognized representation:

- The Principality of Lüneburg.
- The Principality of Calenberg-Göttingen, merged under Eric I of Brunswick-Wolfenbüttel in 1495.
- The Principality of Grubenhagen.
- The Principality of Brunswick-Wolfenbüttel.

By 1705 only two Dukes of Brunswick-Lüneburg survived, one ruling Calenberg, Lüneburg and other possessions, and the other ruling Wolfenbüttel.

=== From Lüneburg to Hanover ===
One of the dynastic lines was that of the princes of Lüneburg, which, in 1635, acquired Calenberg for George, a junior member of the family who set up residence in the city of Hanover. His son Christian Louis, and his brothers inherited Celle in 1648 and thereafter shared it and Calenberg between themselves; a closely related branch of the family ruled separately in Wolfenbüttel.

The territories of Calenberg and Lüneburg-Celle were made an Electorate by the Emperor Leopold I in 1692 in expectation of the imminent inheritance of Celle by the Duke of Calenberg, though the actual dynastic union of the territories did not occur until 1705 under his son George I Louis, and the Electorate was not officially approved by the Imperial Diet until 1708.

The resulting state was known under many different names: Brunswick-Lüneburg, Calenberg, Calenberg-Celle; its ruler was often known as the "Elector of Hanover". Coincidentally, in 1701, the Duke of Brunswick-Lüneburg found himself in the line of succession for the British crown, later confirmed in 1707 by the Act of Union, which he subsequently inherited, thereby creating a personal union of the two crowns on 20 October 1714.

After a little over a decade, the matter of the disputed electorate was settled upon the heir, and the new Duke of Brunswick-Lüneburg (acceded as duke on 23 January 1698), George I Louis, was able to style himself the Elector of Brunswick and Lüneburg from 1708. It was not just happenstance but also religion-driven politics that brought about the circumstance that he was also put into the line of succession for the British crown by the Act of Settlement— which was written to ensure a Protestant succession to the thrones of Scotland and England at a time when anti-Catholic sentiment ran high in much of Northern Europe and much of Great Britain.

In this event, George I succeeded his second cousin Anne, Queen of Great Britain—the last reigning member of the House of Stuart—and subsequently formed a personal union on August 1st, 1714 between the British crown and the duchy of Brunswick-Lüneburg (electorate of Hanover), which would last until well after the end of the Napoleonic Wars more than a century later—including even through the dissolution of the Holy Roman Empire and the rise of a new successor kingdom. In that manner, the "Electorate of Hanover" (the core duchy) was enlarged with the addition of other lands and became the Kingdom of Hanover in 1814 at the peace conferences (Congress of Vienna) settling the future shape of Europe in the aftermath of the Napoleonic Wars.

=== History of the relationship to the British Crown ===
The first Hanoverian King of Great Britain, George I of Great Britain, was the reigning Duke of Brunswick-Lüneburg, and was finally made an official and recognized prince-elector of the Holy Roman Empire in 1708. His possessions were enlarged in 1706 when the hereditary lands of the Calenberg branch of the Dukes of Brunswick-Lüneburg merged with the lands of the Lüneburg-Celle branch to form the Electorate of Hanover. Subsequently, George I was referred to as Elector of Hanover.

In 1700 and 1701, when the English Parliament had addressed the question of an orderly succession, with a particular religious bias toward a Protestant ruler, from the childless ruling Queen Anne (House of Stuart), it passed the provisions of the Act of Settlement 1701 to Sophia of Hanover, granddaughter of James I. Sophia predeceased Queen Anne by a few weeks, but her son and heir, George I, succeeded as King of Great Britain when Anne, his second cousin, died in August 1714. Great Britain and Hanover remained united in personal union until the accession of Queen Victoria in 1837.

George I was followed by his son George II and then his great-grandson George III, the latter retaining the position of elector even after the Holy Roman Empire was abolished by its last emperor in 1806. George III contested the validity of the dissolution of the Empire and maintained separate consular offices and staff for the Electorate of Hanover until the Congress of Vienna at the war's end. After the fall of Napoleon, George III regained his lands plus lands from Prussia as King of Hanover, whilst giving up some other smaller scattered territories.

== Duchy of Brunswick ==
The Wolfenbüttel Line retained its independence, except from 1807 to 1813, when it and Hanover were merged into the Napoleonic Kingdom of Westphalia. The Congress of Vienna of 1815 turned it into an independent state under the name Duchy of Brunswick. The Duchy remained independent and joined first the North German Confederation and then the German Empire in 1871.

When the Wolfenbüttel Line became extinct in 1884, the German government withheld the rightful heir, the Crown Prince of Hanover, from taking control, instead installing a regency. Decades later, the families were reconciled by the marriage of the Crown Prince's son to the Emperor's only daughter, and Wilhelm II, German Emperor, allowed his son-in-law to assume rule in 1913 (his father having renounced his own right).

== Dukes of Brunswick-Lüneburg and successors ==
=== House of Welf ===
==== Partitions of Brunswick-Lüneburg under Welf rule ====
Lordship of Lüneburg (1126-1235) Raised to: Duchy of Brunswick-Lüneburg (1235–1269)
Brunswick (1269–1291)	Lüneburg (1st creation) (1269–1369)
Grubenhagen (1291–1596)	Wolfenbüttel (1st creation) (1291–1292)
Göttingen (1291–1463)	Wolfenbüttel (2nd creation) (1344–1400)
Lüneburg under Ascanian rule (1373–1388)
Lüneburg (2nd creation) (1388–1705)
Wolfenbüttel (3rd creation) (1409–1485)
Calenberg (1st creation) (1432–1584)
Wolfenbüttel (4th creation) (1494–1807)
(annexed Grubenhagen 1617)
Calenberg (2nd creation) (1634–1692); Recalled Hanover 1692
Electorate of Hanover (1692–1866)
Annexed by France
Brunswick (1813–1918)
Annexed by Prussia

==== Table of rulers ====
Ruler	Born	Reign	Death	Ruling part	Consort	Notes
Henry (I) the Proud	1108	1126-1139	20 October 1139	Lordship of Lüneburg	Gertrude of Süpplingenburg; 29 May 1127; Lech, Augsburg one child	Son of Henry IX, Duke of Bavaria. Also Duke of Bavaria (1126-1138) and Duke of Saxony (1137-1139). In a power struggle with King Conrad III of Germany, Henry X lost his duchy to the King, who granted it to his follower Leopold Margrave of Austria, but kept his allodial properties.
Regency of Gertrude of Süpplingenburg (1139-1142)						Inherited Brunswick from his mother after her death in 1143. Also Duke of Saxony (1142-1180) and Duke of Bavaria (1156-1180). When Frederick I, Holy Roman Emperor, became king of Germany, he restored Bavaria to the Welf line.
Henry (II) the Lion	1129/31	1139-1195	6 August 1195	Lordship of Lüneburg	Clementia of Zähringen; 1147 three children Matilda of England; 1168 five children	Inherited Brunswick from his mother after her death in 1143. Also Duke of Saxony (1142-1180) and Duke of Bavaria (1156-1180). When Frederick I, Holy Roman Emperor, became king of Germany, he restored Bavaria to the Welf line.
William Longsword	11 April 1184	1195-1213	12 December 1213	Lordship of Lüneburg	Helena of Denmark; 1202; Hamburg one child	
Regency of Otto IV, Holy Roman Emperor (1213-1218)						He was raised to Duke and recognised as such in 1235, by Frederick II, Holy Roman Emperor
Otto I the Child	1204	1213–1252	9 June 1252	Brunswick-Lüneburg	Matilda of Brandenburg; 1228 ten children	He was raised to Duke and recognised as such in 1235, by Frederick II, Holy Roman Emperor
Albert I the Tall	1236	1252-1279	15 August 1279	Brunswick (in Brunswick-Lüneburg until 1269)	Elisabeth of Brabant; 1254 no children Alexia of Montferrat; 1263 seven children	Children of Otto I, they shared rule of the land until 1269. Albert became Prince of Brunswick and John a Prince of Luneburg.
John	1242	1252-1277	13 December 1277	Lüneburg (in Brunswick-Lüneburg until 1269)	Liutgard of Holstein-Itzehoe; 1265 five children	Children of Otto I, they shared rule of the land until 1269. Albert became Prince of Brunswick and John a Prince of Luneburg.
All Welf lines continued to bear the title "Duke of Brunswick-Lüneburg" between the division of 1269 and the end of the Holy Roman Empire in 1806. This was an additional title to the representation of their actual territorial lordship. However, as this is list of rulers, the list goes beyond the use of the title, going through all generations until the end of the noble family representation in the land, in 1918.
Regencies of Albert I, Duke of Brunswick-Lüneburg (1277-1279) and Conrad of Brunswick-Lüneburg, Prince-Bishop of Verden (1277-1282)						His rule was marked by several feuds, financed by pledges (Verpfändungen), involving border and property disputes with his neighbours. Otto restricted the rights of the knights and safeguarded public order.
Otto II the Strict	1266	1277-1330	10 April 1330	Lüneburg	Matilda of Bavaria; 1288 five children	His rule was marked by several feuds, financed by pledges (Verpfändungen), involving border and property disputes with his neighbours. Otto restricted the rights of the knights and safeguarded public order.
Henry I the Admirable	August 1267	1279–1322	7 September 1322	Grubenhagen (until 1291 in Brunswick)	Agnes of Meissen; 1282 sixteen children	Children of Albert I, ruled jointly. In 1291 divided the land: Henry received Grubenhagen, William Wolfenbüttel and Albert Göttingen. William died without descendants, and Albert reunited his land with his brother's. Wolfenbüttel became part of Göttingen.
William I	1270	1279-1292	30 September 1292	Wolfenbüttel (until 1291 in Brunswick)	Elisabeth of Hesse; 190 no children	Children of Albert I, ruled jointly. In 1291 divided the land: Henry received Grubenhagen, William Wolfenbüttel and Albert Göttingen. William died without descendants, and Albert reunited his land with his brother's. Wolfenbüttel became part of Göttingen.
Albert II the Fat	1268	1279-1318	22 September 1318	Göttingen (until 1291 in Brunswick)	Rixa of Werle; 1284 ten children	Children of Albert I, ruled jointly. In 1291 divided the land: Henry received Grubenhagen, William Wolfenbüttel and Albert Göttingen. William died without descendants, and Albert reunited his land with his brother's. Wolfenbüttel became part of Göttingen.
Otto (I) the Mild	24 June 1292	1318–1344	30 August 1344	Göttingen	Judith of Hesse; 1311 no children Agnes of Brandenburg-Salzwedel; 1319 no children	Sons of Albert II, ruled jointly. After Otto's death Magnus and Ernest divided the land: Magnus received Wolfenbüttel and Ernest Göttingen.
Ernest I	1305	1318–1367	24 April 1367	Göttingen	Elizabeth of Hesse; 1337 three children	Sons of Albert II, ruled jointly. After Otto's death Magnus and Ernest divided the land: Magnus received Wolfenbüttel and Ernest Göttingen.
Magnus I the Pious	1304	1318–1344	1369	Göttingen	Sophia of Brandenburg-Stendal; 1327 eight children	Sons of Albert II, ruled jointly. After Otto's death Magnus and Ernest divided the land: Magnus received Wolfenbüttel and Ernest Göttingen.
Magnus I the Pious	1304	1344-1369	1369	Wolfenbüttel	Sophia of Brandenburg-Stendal; 1327 eight children	Sons of Albert II, ruled jointly. After Otto's death Magnus and Ernest divided the land: Magnus received Wolfenbüttel and Ernest Göttingen.
Henry II	Before 1296	1322–1351	After 1351	Grubenhagen	Jutta of Brandenburg-Stendal; 1318 four children Helvis of Ibelin; 1324 six children	Sons of Henry I, ruled jointly.
Ernest I	1297	1322–1361	9 March 1361	Grubenhagen	Adelheid of Everstein-Polle; June 1335 nine children	Sons of Henry I, ruled jointly.
William	1298	1322–1360	1360	Grubenhagen	Unmarried	Sons of Henry I, ruled jointly.
John I	Before 1296	1322–1325	After 1367	Grubenhagen	Unmarried	Sons of Henry I, ruled jointly.
Otto III	1296	1330–1352	19 August 1352	Lüneburg	Matilda of Mecklenburg; 1311 three children	Sons of Otto II, ruled jointly. After Otto's death in 1352, William ruled alone. His death without descendants precipitated the Lüneburg War of Succession in 1370.
William II the Elder	c.1300	1330–1369	23 November 1369	Lüneburg	Hedwig of Ravensberg; 7 April 1328 one child Maria; After 1387 one child Sophia of Anhalt-Bernburg; 12 March 1346 no children Agnes of Saxe-Lauenburg; 1363 no children	Sons of Otto II, ruled jointly. After Otto's death in 1352, William ruled alone. His death without descendants precipitated the Lüneburg War of Succession in 1370.
Albert I	c.1339	1361–1383	1383	Grubenhagen	Agnes of Brunswick-Lüneburg c.1380? one child	Sons of Ernest I, ruled jointly. John II abdicated 1364 to join the clergy and Albert became sole ruler.
John II	c.1339	1361–1364	18 January 1401	Grubenhagen	Adelheid of Everstein-Polle; June 1335 nine children	Sons of Ernest I, ruled jointly. John II abdicated 1364 to join the clergy and Albert became sole ruler.
Frederick I	1350	1361–1421	1421	Grubenhagen (at Osterode)	Adelaide of Anhalt-Zerbst (d. before 1421) one child	Sons of Ernest I, ruled jointly. John II abdicated 1364 to join the clergy and Albert became sole ruler.
Otto (II) the Evil	1330	1367–1394	13 November 1394	Göttingen	Margarethe of Jülich-Berg; 1379 two children	
Magnus II of the Necklace (Torquatus)	1304	1369–1373	25 July 1373	Wolfenbüttel (with Lüneburg)	Katherine of Anhalt-Bernburg; 1327 eight children	Inherited Wolfenbüttel from his father. However, the Lüneburg War of Succession allowed his succession also in this duchy. However, the War of Succession brought, after his death, the dukes of Saxe-Wittenberg to the government.
After the death of Magnus II with the Necklace, a treaty (the Reconciliation of Hanover) was agreed between the widow of Magnus II and her sons and the claimers, Albert of Saxe-Wittenberg and his uncle Duke Wenceslaus I of Saxe-Wittenberg: the estates of the Principality were to pay homage both to the Welfs and to the Ascanians, and the two noble houses would govern the state alternately. Initially, the land would be given to the two Ascanians from Wittenberg, and after their death it would go to the sons of the fallen Duke Magnus II. After their death, rule of the Principality was to revert to the Ascanians. In order to underpin the agreement, in 1374 Albert of Saxe-Lüneburg married Catharina, the widow of Magnus II. The treaty also envisaged the creation of a statutory body representing the estates, which was to supervise the treaty. However, 1373–1388 would be the only period in which a Brunswick-Luneburg land was not ruled by a Welf: Albert of Saxe-Wittenberg (1373-1385); Wenceslaus I, Duke of Saxe-Wittenberg (1385-1388); In the wake of his death, Elector Wenceslas appointed Bernard, his brother-in-law, as co-regent involved him in the government. But his younger brother Henry did not agree with this ruling, and after vain attempts to reach an agreement, the fight flared up again in the spring of 1388. Elector Wenceslas had to assemble an army without the help of Bernard, supported by the town of Lüneburg. From Winsen an der Aller, he wanted to attack Celle, which was held by Henry and his mother. During the preparations Elector Wenceslas fell seriously ill and died shortly thereafter. According to legend, he was poisoned. Lüneburg continued the preparations, formed an alliance with the Prince-Bishop of Minden and Count of Schaumburg and set up his own army. On 28 May 1388, battle was joined at Winsen an der Aller; it ended in victory for Henry. According to the provisions of the Treaty of Hanover from the year 1373, after the death of Wensceslas, the Principality passed to the House of Welf. In 1389, an inheritance agreement between the Welfs and the Ascanians was concluded, the treaty of 1374 was abolished, and the Principality was secured for the Welfs.
Frederick I	1357	1373–1400	5 June 1400	Wolfenbüttel	Anna of Saxe-Wittenberg; 1386 two children	Children of Magnus II. As the eldest, Frederick inherited Wolfenbüttel alone, while his younger brothers held Luneburg since its recovery in 1388. After Frederick I's childless death in 1400, the remaining brothers exchanged feuds until 1428.
Henry (I) the Mild	1355	1388–1416	14 October 1416	Lüneburg	Sophia of Pomerania; 11 November 1388 two children Margaret of Hesse; 30 January 1409 one child	Children of Magnus II. As the eldest, Frederick inherited Wolfenbüttel alone, while his younger brothers held Luneburg since its recovery in 1388. After Frederick I's childless death in 1400, the remaining brothers exchanged feuds until 1428.
Henry (I) the Mild	1355	1400-1409	14 October 1416	Wolfenbüttel	Sophia of Pomerania; 11 November 1388 two children Margaret of Hesse; 30 January 1409 one child	Children of Magnus II. As the eldest, Frederick inherited Wolfenbüttel alone, while his younger brothers held Luneburg since its recovery in 1388. After Frederick I's childless death in 1400, the remaining brothers exchanged feuds until 1428.
Bernard I	between 1358 and 1364	1388–1409 1428-1434	11 June 1434	Lüneburg	Margaret of Saxe-Wittenberg; 1386 three children	Children of Magnus II. As the eldest, Frederick inherited Wolfenbüttel alone, while his younger brothers held Luneburg since its recovery in 1388. After Frederick I's childless death in 1400, the remaining brothers exchanged feuds until 1428.
Bernard I	between 1358 and 1364	1409-1428	11 June 1434	Wolfenbüttel	Margaret of Saxe-Wittenberg; 1386 three children	Children of Magnus II. As the eldest, Frederick inherited Wolfenbüttel alone, while his younger brothers held Luneburg since its recovery in 1388. After Frederick I's childless death in 1400, the remaining brothers exchanged feuds until 1428.
Regency of Frederick I, Duke of Brunswick-Osterode (1383-1401)						
Eric I the Winner	c.1383	1383–1427	28 May 1427	Grubenhagen	Elisabeth of Brunswick-Göttingen six children	
Otto (III) the One-Eyed	1380	1394–1463	6 February 1463	Göttingen	Agnes of Hesse; 1408 one child	With no male heirs, after his death Göttingen is absorbed by Calenberg.
William (III & I) the Victorious	1392	1416–1428	25 July 1482	Lüneburg	Cecilia of Brandenburg; 30 May/6 June 1423; Berlin two children Matilda of Holstein-Pinneberg; 1466 one child	Sons of Henry the Mild, ruled jointly. In 1428 they exchanged, with their uncle Bernard I, Lüneburg for Wolfenbüttel. In 1432 founded the Principality of Calenberg, a split-off from Lüneburg, and left the remaining Wolfenbüttel to his brother Henry IV. After the latter's death William took his lands. In 1463, attached the Principality of Göttingen to Calenberg. In 1473, William also annexed Wolfenbüttel.
William (III & I) the Victorious	1392	1428–1432	25 July 1482	Wolfenbüttel	Cecilia of Brandenburg; 30 May/6 June 1423; Berlin two children Matilda of Holstein-Pinneberg; 1466 one child	Sons of Henry the Mild, ruled jointly. In 1428 they exchanged, with their uncle Bernard I, Lüneburg for Wolfenbüttel. In 1432 founded the Principality of Calenberg, a split-off from Lüneburg, and left the remaining Wolfenbüttel to his brother Henry IV. After the latter's death William took his lands. In 1463, attached the Principality of Göttingen to Calenberg. In 1473, William also annexed Wolfenbüttel.
William (III & I) the Victorious	1392	1432–1482	25 July 1482	Calenberg (with Göttingen from 1463, and Wolfenbüttel from 1473)	Cecilia of Brandenburg; 30 May/6 June 1423; Berlin two children Matilda of Holstein-Pinneberg; 1466 one child	Sons of Henry the Mild, ruled jointly. In 1428 they exchanged, with their uncle Bernard I, Lüneburg for Wolfenbüttel. In 1432 founded the Principality of Calenberg, a split-off from Lüneburg, and left the remaining Wolfenbüttel to his brother Henry IV. After the latter's death William took his lands. In 1463, attached the Principality of Göttingen to Calenberg. In 1473, William also annexed Wolfenbüttel.
Henry (II) the Peaceful	1411	1416–1428	7 December 1473	Lüneburg	Helena of Clèves; 1436 one child	Sons of Henry the Mild, ruled jointly. In 1428 they exchanged, with their uncle Bernard I, Lüneburg for Wolfenbüttel. In 1432 founded the Principality of Calenberg, a split-off from Lüneburg, and left the remaining Wolfenbüttel to his brother Henry IV. After the latter's death William took his lands. In 1463, attached the Principality of Göttingen to Calenberg. In 1473, William also annexed Wolfenbüttel.
Henry (II) the Peaceful	1411	1428-1473	7 December 1473	Wolfenbüttel	Helena of Clèves; 1436 one child	Sons of Henry the Mild, ruled jointly. In 1428 they exchanged, with their uncle Bernard I, Lüneburg for Wolfenbüttel. In 1432 founded the Principality of Calenberg, a split-off from Lüneburg, and left the remaining Wolfenbüttel to his brother Henry IV. After the latter's death William took his lands. In 1463, attached the Principality of Göttingen to Calenberg. In 1473, William also annexed Wolfenbüttel.
Otto II	1396	1421-1452	1452	Grubenhagen (at Osterode)	Schonetta of Nassau-Weilburg (d.1436); 1414 one child	After his death, Osterode returned to Grubenhagen.
Regency of Otto II, Duke of Brunswick-Osterode (1427–1440)						Sons of Eric I, were under regency until 1440, when they divided Grubenhagen. Henry kept Heldenburg Castle, and Albert Herzberg Castle, but kept the joint rule at Osterode am Harz and Einbeck. Ernest didn't participate in the division, and abdicated in 1464, to become a canon in Halberstadt.
Henry III	1416	1427–1464	20 December 1464	Grubenhagen (at Heldenburg from 1440)	Margaret of Żagań before 27 June 1457 two children	Sons of Eric I, were under regency until 1440, when they divided Grubenhagen. Henry kept Heldenburg Castle, and Albert Herzberg Castle, but kept the joint rule at Osterode am Harz and Einbeck. Ernest didn't participate in the division, and abdicated in 1464, to become a canon in Halberstadt.
Albert II	1 November 1419	1427–1485	15 August 1485	Grubenhagen (at Herzberg)	Elisabeth of Waldeck; 15 October 1471 two children	Sons of Eric I, were under regency until 1440, when they divided Grubenhagen. Henry kept Heldenburg Castle, and Albert Herzberg Castle, but kept the joint rule at Osterode am Harz and Einbeck. Ernest didn't participate in the division, and abdicated in 1464, to become a canon in Halberstadt.
Ernest II	1418	1427–1466	1466	Grubenhagen	Unmarried	Sons of Eric I, were under regency until 1440, when they divided Grubenhagen. Henry kept Heldenburg Castle, and Albert Herzberg Castle, but kept the joint rule at Osterode am Harz and Einbeck. Ernest didn't participate in the division, and abdicated in 1464, to become a canon in Halberstadt.
Otto IV the Lame	?	1434–1446	1446	Lüneburg	Elisabeth of Eberstein; 1425 one child	Ruled jointly. Their rule was marked by major building work to Celle Castle and also by numerous reforms which improved the legal situation of farmers vis-à-vis their local lords. Frederick abdicated to his sons and went to a monastery, but after the death of his son Otto, he left the monastery and resumed his rule.
Frederick II the Pious	1418	1434–1457 1471-1478	19 March 1478	Lüneburg	Magdalene of Brandenburg; 3 July 1429; Tangermünde three children	Ruled jointly. Their rule was marked by major building work to Celle Castle and also by numerous reforms which improved the legal situation of farmers vis-à-vis their local lords. Frederick abdicated to his sons and went to a monastery, but after the death of his son Otto, he left the monastery and resumed his rule.
Otto V the Magnanimous	1439	1457–1471	9 January 1471	Lüneburg	Anne of Nassau-Siegen; 25 September 1467; Celle two children	Children of Frederick II, ruled jointly. Bernard was also Prince-Bishop of Hildesheim.
Bernard II	1437	1457–1464	1464	Lüneburg	Matilda of Holstein-Pinneberg; 1463 no children	Children of Frederick II, ruled jointly. Bernard was also Prince-Bishop of Hildesheim.
Regency of Albert II, Duke of Brunswick-Grubenhagen (1464-1479)						With his uncle Albert, officialized the division of Grubenhagen. However, his death without descendants allowed his cousins (sons of Albert) to reunite Grubenhagen.
Henry IV	1460	1464–1526	6 December 1526	Grubenhagen (at Heldenburg)	Elisabeth of Saxe-Lauenburg; 26 August 1494; Einbeck no children	With his uncle Albert, officialized the division of Grubenhagen. However, his death without descendants allowed his cousins (sons of Albert) to reunite Grubenhagen.
Regency of Anne of Nassau-Siegen (1478-1486)						Son of Otto V. As he opposed to the newly elected Emperor Charles V, the latter deposed him from the duchy and gave it to his sons.
Henry (III) the Middle	15 September 1468	1478–1520	19 February 1532	Lüneburg	Margaret of Saxony; 27 February 1487; Celle seven children Anna von Camp c.1528? no children	Son of Otto V. As he opposed to the newly elected Emperor Charles V, the latter deposed him from the duchy and gave it to his sons.
Frederick III the Turbulent	1424	1482–1485	7 July 1503	Calenberg	Anna of Brunswick-Grubenhagen-Einbeck; After 1460 no children Margaret of Rietberg; 10 May 1483 no children	Imprisoned by his brother William, who took his place.
William (IV & II) the Younger	1425	1482–1485	7 July 1503	Wolfenbüttel	Elizabeth of Stolberg-Wernigerode; 1444 three children	Inherited Wolfenbüttel from his father. Joined Calenberg to his domains in 1485, when he imprisoned his brother. Abdicated to his sons in 1491.
William (IV & II) the Younger	1425	1485–1491	7 July 1503	Calenberg (with Wolfenbüttel)	Elizabeth of Stolberg-Wernigerode; 1444 three children	Inherited Wolfenbüttel from his father. Joined Calenberg to his domains in 1485, when he imprisoned his brother. Abdicated to his sons in 1491.
Philip I	1476	1485–1551	4 September 1551	Grubenhagen (at Herzberg; from 1526 all Grubenhagen)	Unknown before 1509 one child Catherine of Mansfeld-Vorderort c.1510? nine children	Son of Albert V, in 1526 reunited Grubenhagen under his hands.
Eric I the Elder	16 February 1470	1491-1540	30 July 1540	Calenberg	Katharina of Saxony; 1496/97 no children Elisabeth of Brandenburg; 7 July 1525; Stettin four children	Sons of William V, ruled jointly. In 1494, they divided their lands. Henry retained Wolfenbüttel and Eric retained Calenberg.
Henry (IV) the Elder	14 June 1463	1491–1494	23 June 1514	Calenberg	Catherine of Pomerania-Wolgast; 1486 nine children	Sons of William V, ruled jointly. In 1494, they divided their lands. Henry retained Wolfenbüttel and Eric retained Calenberg.
Henry (IV) the Elder	14 June 1463	1494–1514	23 June 1514	Wolfenbüttel	Catherine of Pomerania-Wolgast; 1486 nine children	Sons of William V, ruled jointly. In 1494, they divided their lands. Henry retained Wolfenbüttel and Eric retained Calenberg.
Henry (V) the Younger	10 November 1489	1514–1568	11 June 1568	Wolfenbüttel	Maria of Württemberg; 1515 eight children Sophia of Poland; 22/25 February 1556 no children	He was the last Catholic of his family. Under him the medieval fortress (Burg) was rebuilt into a castle (Schloss); he was a passionate opponent of the Lutherans, and driving force behind the Catholic alliance established against the Schmalkaldic League; the disinheritance of a third son could not be carried out.
Otto (VI & I)	24 August 1495	1520–1549	11 August 1549	Lüneburg (from 1527 in Harburg)	Meta von Camp; 1527 no children	Sons of Henry VII, ruled jointly. Otto abdicated in 1527 and founded his own estate, the Lordship of Harburg, which passed to his own descendants. Ernest was a champion of the Protestant cause during the early years of the Protestant Reformation. Francis started his co-rulership in 1536, and abdicated three years later to rule in his own estate, the Principality of Gifhorn, which was reannexed to Lüneburg after his death as he left no descendants.
Ernest I the Confessor	27 June 1497	1520–1546	11 January 1546	Lüneburg	Sophia of Mecklenburg-Schwerin; 2 June 1528; Schwerin seven children	Sons of Henry VII, ruled jointly. Otto abdicated in 1527 and founded his own estate, the Lordship of Harburg, which passed to his own descendants. Ernest was a champion of the Protestant cause during the early years of the Protestant Reformation. Francis started his co-rulership in 1536, and abdicated three years later to rule in his own estate, the Principality of Gifhorn, which was reannexed to Lüneburg after his death as he left no descendants.
Francis	23 November 1508	1536–1539	23 November 1549	Lüneburg	Clara of Saxe-Lauenburg; 29 September 1547; Amt Neuhaus seven children	Sons of Henry VII, ruled jointly. Otto abdicated in 1527 and founded his own estate, the Lordship of Harburg, which passed to his own descendants. Ernest was a champion of the Protestant cause during the early years of the Protestant Reformation. Francis started his co-rulership in 1536, and abdicated three years later to rule in his own estate, the Principality of Gifhorn, which was reannexed to Lüneburg after his death as he left no descendants.
Regencies of Elisabeth of Brandenburg and Philip I, Landgrave of Hesse (1540–1545)						During his regency, his mother implemented the Reformation in Calenberg. She also wrote a "government manual" for Eric, with important advice that should serve him as a guide. Left no descendants, and Calenberg was annexed to Wolfenbüttel.
Eric II	10 August 1528	1540–1584	17 November 1584	Calenberg	Sidonie of Saxony; 17 May 1545; Hann. Münden no children Dorothea of Lorraine; 26 November 1575; Nancy no children	During his regency, his mother implemented the Reformation in Calenberg. She also wrote a "government manual" for Eric, with important advice that should serve him as a guide. Left no descendants, and Calenberg was annexed to Wolfenbüttel.
Council of Regency (1546–1555)						Left no descendants. The land passed to his brothers.
Francis Otto	20 June 1530	1546–1559	29 April 1559	Lüneburg	Elizabeth Magdalene of Brandenburg; 1559 no children	Left no descendants. The land passed to his brothers.
Otto II	25 September 1528	1549-1603	26 October 1603	Lüneburg (in Harburg)	Margaret of Schwarzburg-Leutenberg; 8 September 1551 four children Hedwig of East Frisia; 8 October 1562 twelve children	
Ernest III	17 December 1518	1551–1567	2 April 1567	Grubenhagen	Margaret of Pomerania-Wolgast; 9 October 1547; Wolgast one child	Left no male descendants. The land passed to his brother Wolfgang.
Henry (VI)	1533	1559–1598	19 January 1598	Lüneburg (from 1569 in Dannenberg)	Ursula of Saxe-Lauenburg; 1569 seven children	Brothers of Francis Otto, ruled jointly. In 1569 Henry founded the duchy of Dannenberg, which left to his own descendants. William ruled alone from 1569.
William V the Younger	4 July 1535	1559–1592	20 August 1592	Lüneburg	Dorothea of Denmark; 12 October 1561 fifteen children	Brothers of Francis Otto, ruled jointly. In 1569 Henry founded the duchy of Dannenberg, which left to his own descendants. William ruled alone from 1569.
Wolfgang	6 April 1531	1567–1595	14 May 1595	Grubenhagen	Dorothea of Saxe-Lauenburg; 10 December 1570; Osterode am Harz no children	Like most of his predecessors, he had financial problems, so he was often forced to sell or pledge major parts of his possession and he had to demand high taxes. As he left no male descendants, the land passed to his brother Philip.
Julius	29 June 1528	1568–1589	3 May 1589	Wolfenbüttel	Hedwig of Brandenburg; 25 February 1560; Cölln eleven children	In 1584 absorbes the Principality of Calenberg. By embracing the Protestant Reformation, establishing the University of Helmstedt, and introducing a series of administrative reforms, Julius was one of the most important Brunswick dukes in the early modern era.
Ernest II	31 December 1564	1592–1611	2 March 1611	Lüneburg	Unmarried	Left no descendants. The land passed to his brother, Christian.
Henry Julius	15 October 1564	1589–1613	30 July 1613	Wolfenbüttel	Dorothea of Saxony; 26 September 1585; Wolfenbüttel one child Elizabeth of Denmark; 19 April 1590; Cölln ten children	In 1596 occupied Grubenhagen.
Philip II	2 May 1533	1595–1596	4 April 1596	Grubenhagen	Clara of Brunswick-Wolfenbüttel; 1 July 1560; Wolfenbüttel no children	As he left no male descendants, the land had no heir and was occupied by the Principality of Wolfenbüttel.
Grubenhagen annexed to Wolfenbüttel, and then definitely to Lüneburg
Julius Ernest	11 March 1571	1598-1636	26 October 1636	Lüneburg (at Dannenberg)	Maria of East Frisia; 1 September 1614 two children Sybille of Brunswick-Lüneburg; 1616 two children	Left no descendants. The short-lived Dannenberg principality reverted to Lüneburg.
William Augustus	15 March 1564	1603-1642	30 March 1642	Lüneburg (in Harburg)	Unmarried	Sons of Otto II, ruled together in Harburg. After William Augustus's death, the lordship reunited with Lüneburg.
Otto III	20 March 1572	1603-1641	4 August 1641	Lüneburg (in Harburg)	Hedwig of Brunswick-Wolfenbüttel; 14 April 1621; Wolfenbüttel no children	Sons of Otto II, ruled together in Harburg. After William Augustus's death, the lordship reunited with Lüneburg.
Christopher	21 August 1570	1603-1606	7 July 1606	Lüneburg (in Harburg)	Elisabeth of Brunswick-Wolfenbüttel; 28 October 1604; Harburg no children	Sons of Otto II, ruled together in Harburg. After William Augustus's death, the lordship reunited with Lüneburg.
Regency of Elizabeth of Denmark (1616-1622)						Children of Henry Julius. Frederick Ulirch inheriteed the major duchy, and Sophie Hedwig a seat at Spiegelberg. Because of his alcoholism, Frederick Ulrich was deposed by his own mother, with the help of her brother, Christian IV of Denmark. She took the regency in his name. During her regency, Elizabeth lost in 1617 the Principality of Grubenhagen and left the government business for Anton von Streithorst, who nearly ruined the state by minting coins from cheap metals and thus causing inflation. Because of the bad situation of the state, the king of Denmark had Frederick take control of the government again. Frederick didn't leave descendants, and his lands passed to collateral lines of the Lüneburg Welfs.
Frederick Ulrich	5 April 1591	1613–1634	11 August 1634	Wolfenbüttel	Anna Sophia of Brandenburg; 4 September 1614; Wolfenbüttel no children	
Sophia Hedwig	13 June 1592	1613–1642	13 January 1642	Wolfenbüttel (at Spiegelberg)	Ernest Casimir I, Count of Nassau-Dietz; 8 June 1607; Dillenburg two children	
Christian the Elder	9 November 1566	1611-1633	8 November 1633	Lüneburg (with Grubenhagen from 1617)	Unmarried	Absorbed Grubenhagen from Wolfenbüttel. As he left no descendants, the land passed to his brother, Augustus. Grubenhagen is definitively annexed to Lüneburg.
Augustus the Elder	18 November 1568	1633–1636	1 October 1636	Lüneburg (and Grubenhagen)	Unmarried	No legitimate issue. The land passed to his brother, Frederick IV.
George	17 February 1582	1634–1641	2 April 1641	Calenberg	Anne Eleonore of Hesse-Darmstadt; 14 December 1617; Darmstadt eight children	Younger son of William VI. Inherited Calenberg from his cousin Frederick Ulrich, who had left no descendants. Abdicated to his son in 1641.
Augustus the Younger	10 April 1579	1634–1666	17 September 1666	Wolfenbüttel	Clara Maria of Pomerania-Barth; 13 December 1607; Strelitz two children Dorothea of Anhalt-Zerbst; 26 October 1623; Zerbst five children Elisabeth Sophie of Mecklenburg; 1635 two children	Younger son of Henry (VI). Inherited Wolfenbüttel from his cousin Frederick Ulrich, who had left no descendants. In 1643 he moved into the Residence at Wolfenbüttel, was the founder of a barock theatre and the Bibliotheca Augusta.
Frederick IV	28 August 1574	1636–1648	10 December 1648	Lüneburg	Unmarried	As he left no descendants, the land passed to a nephew, Christian Louis, son of Frederick's brother George.
Christian Louis	25 February 1622	1641–1648	15 March 1665	Calenberg	Sophia Dorothea of Schleswig-Holstein-Sonderburg-Glücksburg; 9 October 1653 no children	In 1648 inherited the Principality of Lüneburg from his uncle Frederick IV, he gave Calenberg to his younger brother George William, and instead ruled the larger territory of Lüneburg.
Christian Louis	25 February 1622	1648-1665	15 March 1665	Lüneburg	Sophia Dorothea of Schleswig-Holstein-Sonderburg-Glücksburg; 9 October 1653 no children	In 1648 inherited the Principality of Lüneburg from his uncle Frederick IV, he gave Calenberg to his younger brother George William, and instead ruled the larger territory of Lüneburg.
George William	26 January 1624	1648–1665	28 August 1705	Calenberg	Éléonore Desmier d'Olbreuse; 1676 one child	When his brother, Christian Louis died childless in 1665, George William inherited Luneburg. He then gave Calenberg to his next brother, John Frederick. At his death without male descendants, the land passed to his son-in-law, the Elector of Hanover. Lüneburg is annexed to Hanover.
George William	26 January 1624	1665-1705	28 August 1705	Lüneburg	Éléonore Desmier d'Olbreuse; 1676 one child	When his brother, Christian Louis died childless in 1665, George William inherited Luneburg. He then gave Calenberg to his next brother, John Frederick. At his death without male descendants, the land passed to his son-in-law, the Elector of Hanover. Lüneburg is annexed to Hanover.
Lüneburg definitely annexed to Hanover
Rudolf Augustus	16 May 1627	1666–1704	26 January 1704	Wolfenbüttel	Christiane Elizabeth of Barby-Mühlingen; 1650 three children Rosine Elisabeth Menthe; 1681 (morganatic) no children	Sons of Augustus II, the eldest two ruled jointly from 1685 to 1702. The youngest, Ferdinand Albert, ruled from the town of Bevern. According to reports dating to 1677, Rudolf Augustus slashed a way through the Lechlum Forest, the Alten Weg ('Old Way'), later the "Barock Road" between the Lustschloss of Antoinettenruh via the little barock castle [later the Sternhaus] to the Großes Weghaus at Stöckheim; in 1671 captured the town and fortress of Brunswick. After the death of Rudolf Augustus, Anthony Ulrich returned to the throne and ruled alone. A politician, art lover and poet, he founded a museum named after him in Brunswick; he had also Salzdahlum Castle built.
Anthony Ulrich	4 October 1633	1685-1702 1704–1714	27 March 1714	Wolfenbüttel	Elizabeth Juliana of Schleswig-Holstein-Sønderburg-Nordborg; 17 August 1656 thirteen children	
Ferdinand Albert I	22 May 1636	1666-1687	23 April 1687	Wolfenbüttel (at Bevern)	Christine of Hesse-Eschwege; 25 November 1667; Eschwege six children	
John Frederick	25 April 1625	1665–1679	18 December 1679	Calenberg	Benedicta Henrietta of the Palatinate; 30 November 1668; Hanover three children	Brother of Christian Louis and George William. As he left no male heirs, the land passed to his younger brother, Ernest Augustus.
Ernest Augustus I	20 November 1629	1679–1692	23 January 1698	Calenberg	Sophia of the Palatinate; 30 September 1658; Heidelberg seven children	Youngest son of George. Brother of Christian Louis, George William and John Frederick. In 1692, he was appointed Prince-elector by Leopold I, Holy Roman Emperor, thus raising the House of Welf to electoral dignity. The old Principality of Calenberg thus adopted the new name of Electorate of Hanover.
Ernest Augustus I	20 November 1629	1692-1698	23 January 1698	Electorate of Hanover	Sophia of the Palatinate; 30 September 1658; Heidelberg seven children	Youngest son of George. Brother of Christian Louis, George William and John Frederick. In 1692, he was appointed Prince-elector by Leopold I, Holy Roman Emperor, thus raising the House of Welf to electoral dignity. The old Principality of Calenberg thus adopted the new name of Electorate of Hanover.
George I Louis	28 May 1660	1698–1727	11 June 1727	Electorate of Hanover	Sophia Dorothea of Brunswick-Lüneburg; 22 November 1682; Celle (annulled 1694) two children	The electorship became effective under his rule. In 1705 reunited his father-in-law's princedom of Lüneburg to the Electorate. In 1714 was chosen for King of Great Britain, starting a personal union between Hanover and this new country. Lüneburg was definitely annexed to the Electorate. Thus the Wolfenbüttel was the remaining old land of Brunswick-Lüneburg that remained separate.
Augustus William	8 March 1662	1714–1731	23 March 1731	Wolfenbüttel	Christine Sophie of Brunswick-Wolfenbüttel; 1681 no children Sophie Amalie of Holstein-Gottorp; 1695 no children Elisabeth Sophie Marie of Schleswig-Holstein-Sonderborg-Norburg; 1710 no children	Son of Anthony Ulrich. Ruler of the only land that was still not in Hanoverian lands, to which it would never belong.
George II Augustus	30 October / 9 November 1683^{O.S./N.S.}	1727–1760	25 October 1760	Electorate of Hanover	Wilhelmina Charlotte Caroline of Brandenburg-Ansbach; 22 August / 2 September 1705^{O.S./N.S.} Hanover ten children	In personal union with Great Britain.
Louis Rudolph	22 July 1671	1731–1735	1 March 1735	Wolfenbüttel	Christine Louise of Oettingen-Oettingen; 22 April 1690; Aurich three children	Left no male heirs, and his land passed to a collateral line.
Ferdinand Albert II	29 May 1680	1687-1735 1735	2 September 1735	Wolfenbüttel (in Bevern) Wolfenbüttel	Antoinette Amalie of Brunswick-Wolfenbüttel; 15 October 1712; Brunswick thirteen children	From the line of Brunswick-Bevern. Grandson of Augustus II.
Charles I	1 August 1713	1735–1773	26 March 1780	Wolfenbüttel	Philippine Charlotte of Prussia; 2 June 1733; Berlin thirteen children	Founder of the Collegium Carolinum in Brunswick, the porcelain makers of Fürstenberg, the fire office; in 1753 the Residence was moved to Brunswick.
George III William Frederick	4 June 1738	1760-1811	29 January 1820	Electorate of Hanover	Charlotte of Mecklenburg-Strelitz; 8 September 1761; London fifteen children	In personal union with Great Britain.
Charles II William Ferdinand	9 October 1735	1773–1806	10 November 1806	Wolfenbüttel	Augusta of Great Britain; 16 January 1764; London seven children	Due to financial problems, was obliged to replace his father. He was the head of the Prussian Army; died in the Battle of Jena; because his son and heir died young, and two other sons were not eligible, rule passed to his youngest son.
With the dissolution of the Holy Roman Empire in 1806, the title of Duke of Brunswick-Lüneburg ceased to exist. However, its successor states continued.
Frederick William the Black Duke	9 October 1771	1806–1807 1813–1815	16 June 1815	Wolfenbüttel (1813-15) Brunswick (1806-07)	Marie Elisabeth Wilhelmine of Baden; 1 November 1802; Karlsruhe three children	Duke of Oels/Silesia, the "Black Duke"; recruited a Freikorps (volunteer corps), the Black Brunswickers, at the outbreak of the War of the Fifth Coalition in Bohemia in 1809, and made his way via Brunswick to the North Sea and then on to Great Britain.
On the Eve of Napoleonic era, in 1807 the Duchy was briefly annexed to the Kingdom of France, to appear again in 1813 as Duchy of Brunswick.
George IV Augustus Frederick	12 August 1762	1811–1830	26 June 1830	Electorate of Hanover (until 1814); Kingdom of Hanover (from 1814)	Caroline Amelia Elizabeth of Brunswick-Wolfenbüttel; 8 April 1795; London one child	In personal union with the United Kingdom. Named regent of his father due to his illness, succeeding him after his death in 1820. Left no male descendants. The land passed to his brother.
Regency of George IV of the United Kingdom (1815-1823)						On the eve of the July Revolution of 1830, Charles was in Paris, and did not manage to keep the duchy for himself; his brother William took over with the agreement of the people and his international neighbours.
Charles II	30 October 1804	1815–1830	18 August 1873	Brunswick	Unmarried	On the eve of the July Revolution of 1830, Charles was in Paris, and did not manage to keep the duchy for himself; his brother William took over with the agreement of the people and his international neighbours.
William Henry	21 August 1765	1830–1837	20 June 1837	Kingdom of Hanover	Adelaide of Saxe-Meiningen; 13 July 1818; London four children	In personal union with the United Kingdom. Usually numbered IV as King of Hanover and the United Kingdom. As he left only illegitimate descendants, the land passed to his brother.
William	25 April 1806	1830–1884	18 October 1884	Brunswick	Unmarried	Brother of Charles II.
Ernest Augustus	5 June 1771	1837–1851	18 November 1851	Kingdom of Hanover	Frederica of Mecklenburg-Strelitz; 29 May 1815; Neustrelitz three children	End of personal union with the United Kingdom, as in this country the successor in 1837 was Queen Victoria (in Hanover the Salic Law was still active).
George V Frederick	27 May 1819	1851–1866	12 June 1878	Kingdom of Hanover	Marie of Saxe-Altenburg (I); 18 February 1843; Hanover three children	He was the last king of Hanover, as his reign ended with the Unification of Germany.
Hanover annexed to the German Empire
Regencies of Prince Albert of Prussia (1885-1906) and Duke John Albert of Mecklenburg-Schwerin (1906-1913)						His regency came to an end on 1 November 1913 when Ernest Augustus, Crown Prince of Hanover's son, was permitted to ascend to Duchy following his marriage to Princess Victoria Louise of Prussia. In 1918, with the abolition of the monarchy, all nobles titles were equally abolished.
Ernest Augustus	17 November 1887	1913–1918	30 January 1953	Brunswick	Victoria Louise of Prussia; 24 May 1913; Berlin five children	His regency came to an end on 1 November 1913 when Ernest Augustus, Crown Prince of Hanover's son, was permitted to ascend to Duchy following his marriage to Princess Victoria Louise of Prussia. In 1918, with the abolition of the monarchy, all nobles titles were equally abolished.

== See also ==
- Electorate of Hanover
- Duchy of Brunswick
- Duchy of Gifhorn
- Principality of Brunswick-Wolfenbüttel
- Principality of Calenberg
- Principality of Grubenhagen
- Principality of Göttingen
- Principality of Lüneburg
- Brunswick-Bevern
- House of Hanover
- House of Welf
- List of the rulers of Lüneburg
- List of the rulers of Brunswick-Wolfenbüttel
