= John of Brunswick-Lüneburg =

John of Brunswick-Lüneburg may refer to:

- John, Duke of Brunswick-Lüneburg (1242–1277)
- John I, Duke of Brunswick-Grubenhagen (before 1322–1367)
- John II, Duke of Brunswick-Grubenhagen (d. 1401), canon in Hildesheim, Einbeck and Mainz, son of Ernest I, Duke of Brunswick-Grubenhagen
- John Frederick, Duke of Brunswick-Lüneburg (1625–1679)
