= Otto, Duke of Brunswick-Lüneburg =

Otto, Duke of Brunswick-Lüneburg may refer to:

- Otto I, Duke of Brunswick-Lüneburg (1204-1252)
- Otto the Mild, Duke of Brunswick-Lüneburg (1292-1344)
- Otto II, Duke of Brunswick-Lüneburg (1266-1330)
- Otto III, Duke of Brunswick-Lüneburg (1296-1352)
- Otto IV, Duke of Brunswick-Lüneburg (died 1446)
- Otto V, Duke of Brunswick-Lüneburg (1439-1471)
