= Albert II of Brunswick-Grubenhagen =

Duke of the Principality Grubenhagen

- Born: 1 November 1419
- Died: 15 August 1485 (aged 65)
- Burial: Osterode am Harz
- Spouse: Elisabeth of Waldeck
- Issue: Philip I Eric
- House: House of Guelph
- Father: Eric I, Duke of Brunswick-Grubenhagen
- Mother: Elizabeth of Brunswick-Göttingen

Albert II, Duke of Brunswick-Lüneburg (German: Albrecht II., Herzog zu Braunschweig-Lüneburg; 1 November 1419 – 15 August 1485), was a Prince of Grubenhagen; he reigned from 1440 until his death in 1485.

Albert II was the third son of Duke Eric I and Elizabeth of Brunswick-Göttingen, a daughter of Otto the Bad, Duke of Brunswick-Göttingen. He was a grandson of the Duke Albert I, was still a minor when his father died on 27 May 1427. His first cousin once removed, Duke Otto the Younger of Grubenhagen-Osterode served until 1440 as regent for Albert II and his brothers Henry III and Ernest II. After 1440, the three brothers, following the Grubenhagen tradition, ruled jointly until Henry died in 1464. After the death of Henry III, Ernest II joined the clergy and Albert II became sole ruler and regent for Henry III's son, Henry IV.

Albert II was repeatedly involved in feuds. For example, in 1477, Duke William IV the Younger of Göttingen got into a dispute with the city of Einbeck (in the Duchy of Grubenhagen) and in 1479, he encamped his army before the town. The citizens of Einbeck came out to fight him in an open field. Duke William lured them into an ambush and defeated them completely. According to the chroniclers, more than 300 citizens were killed and over 800 were captured and brought to William's Hardegsen Castle. Albert and William settled their dispute on 5 December 1479 in Göttingen, without a battle. The city of Einbeck, however, had to pay a ransom of 30000guilders to free the captive citizens, and had to accept William's protection.

Henry IV came of age in 1479 and agreed with his uncle on a division of their territory. Albert kept Herzberg Castle and Osterode Castle, while Henry received Heldenburg Castle. The towns of Einbeck and Osterode were ruled jointly.

Albrecht was married with Elizabeth, daughter of Count Wolrad I of Waldeck. She gave birth to his three sons and a daughter Sophie, who died at age 6. His son Ernest died shortly after Albert himself died. Albert was succeeded in government by his son Philip I, while his son Eric became Bishop of Osnabrück and Paderborn. In 1532, Eric was elected Bishop of Münster, but he died on May 14 of that year, before he had been confirmed.

Albert died in 1485 and was buried in Osterode am Harz.

== Ancestors ==
Ancestors of Albert II of Brunswick-Grubenhagen

8. Ernest I, Duke of Brunswick-Grubenhagen
4. Albert I, Duke of Brunswick-Grubenhagen
9. Adelaide of Everstein-Polle
2. Eric I, Duke of Brunswick-Grubenhagen
10. Magnus II, Duke of Brunswick-Lüneburg
5. Agnes of Brunswick-Lüneburg
11. Catherine of Anhalt-Bernburg
1. Albert II, Duke of Brunswick-Grubenhagen
12. Ernest I, Duke of Brunswick-Göttingen
6. Otto I, Duke of Brunswick-Göttingen
13. Elisabeth of Hesse
3. Elisabeth of Brunswick-Göttingen
14. William VII of Jülich, 1st Duke of Berg
7. Margaret of Jülich-Berg
15. Anna of the Palatinate

== References and sources ==
- Ferdinand Spehr (1875). "Albrecht III. (Herzog von Braunschweig-Grubenhagen)" . Allgemeine Deutsche Biographie (in German). Vol. 1. Leipzig: Duncker & Humblot. p. 264.

Albert II of Brunswick-Grubenhagen House of Welf Cadet branch of the House of Este Born: 1 November 1419 Died: 15 August 1485
Preceded by Henry III	Duke of Brunswick-Lüneburg; Prince of Grubenhagen; 1440–1485	Succeeded by Philip I
Preceded by Otto II	Ruler of Osterode; 1452–1485	Succeeded by Philip I
