= Ernest of Brunswick-Lüneburg =

Ernest of Brunswick-Lüneburg may refer to:

- Ernest I, Duke of Brunswick-Lüneburg (1497–1546), also called Ernest the Confessor
- Ernest II, Duke of Brunswick-Lüneburg (1564–1611)
- Ernest I, Duke of Brunswick-Grubenhagen (c. 1297–1361)
- Ernest II, Duke of Brunswick-Grubenhagen (1418–1466)
- Ernest III, Duke of Brunswick-Grubenhagen (1518–1567)
- Ernest I, Duke of Brunswick-Göttingen (c. 1305–1367)
- Ernest Ferdinand, Duke of Brunswick-Lüneburg (1682–1746)
- Ernest Augustus, Elector of Brunswick-Lüneburg (1629–1698)
- Ernest Augustus, Duke of Brunswick (1887–1953)
- Duke Louis Ernest of Brunswick-Lüneburg (1718–1788)
