= Henry of Brunswick-Lüneburg =

Henry of Brunswick-Lüneburg may refer to:

- Henry I, Duke of Brunswick-Grubenhagen (1267–1322), also called Henry the Admirable
- Henry II, Duke of Brunswick-Grubenhagen (before 1296 – after 1351)
- Henry III, Duke of Brunswick-Grubenhagen (1416–1464)
- Henry IV, Duke of Brunswick-Grubenhagen (1460–1526)
- Henry the Mild, Duke of Brunswick-Lüneburg (1355-1416)
- Henry the Peaceful, Duke of Brunswick-Lüneburg (1411–1473)
- Henry the Elder, Duke of Brunswick-Lüneburg (1463–1514)
- Henry the Middle, Duke of Brunswick-Lüneburg(1468–1532)
- Henry the Younger, Duke of Brunswick-Lüneburg (1489–1568)
- Henry, Duke of Brunswick-Dannenberg (1533–1598)
- Henry Julius, Duke of Brunswick-Wolfenbüttel (1564–1613)
