= Ernest II of Brunswick-Grubenhagen =

Ernest II, Duke of Brunswick-Grubenhagen
- Born: 1418
- Died: 1466 (aged 47–48)
- House: House of Guelph
- Father: Eric I, Duke of Brunswick-Grubenhagen
- Mother: Elisabeth of Brunswick-Göttingen

Duke Ernest II of Brunswick-Grubenhagen (1418–1466) was the second son of Duke Eric I of Brunswick-Grubenhagen and his wife, Elisabeth of Brunswick-Göttingen.

When his father died in 1427, Ernest II was still a minor. His mother and his first cousin once removed, Otto II, acted as guardians and regents for Ernest and his brothers Henry III and Albert II, until the three brothers came of age in 1440.

When Henry III died in 1464, Ernest II abdicated and became a canon in Halberstadt.

Ernest II never married.

Ancestors of Ernest II of Brunswick-Grubenhagen

8. Ernest I, Duke of Brunswick-Grubenhagen
4. Albert I, Duke of Brunswick-Grubenhagen
9. Adelaide of Everstein-Polle
2. Eric I, Duke of Brunswick-Grubenhagen
10. Magnus II, Duke of Brunswick-Lüneburg
5. Agnes of Brunswick-Lüneburg
11. Catherine of Anhalt-Bernburg
1. Ernest II, Duke of Brunswick-Grubenhagen
12. Ernest I, Duke of Brunswick-Göttingen
6. Otto I, Duke of Brunswick-Göttingen
13. Elisabeth of Hesse
3. Elisabeth of Brunswick-Göttingen
14. William VII of Jülich, 1st Duke of Berg
7. Margaret of Jülich-Berg
15. Anna of the Palatinate

Ernest II of Brunswick-Grubenhagen House of Guelph Born: 1418 Died: 1466
Preceded by Eric I	Duke of Brunswick-Grubenhagen; 1440–1464; With: Henry III and Albert II	Succeeded by Henry IV and Albert II
