= Ernest II =

Ernest II may refer to:

- Ernest II, Duke of Swabia (died in 1030)
- Ernest II, Duke of Brunswick-Grubenhagen (1418–1466)
- Ernest II, Count of Mansfeld-Vorderort (1479–1531)
- Ernest II, Duke of Brunswick-Lüneburg (1564–1611)
- Ernest II, Duke of Saxe-Gotha-Altenburg (1745–1804)
- Ernest II, Duke of Saxe-Coburg and Gotha (1818–1893)
- Ernest II, Count of Lippe-Biesterfeld (1842–1904)
- Ernst II, Prince of Hohenlohe-Langenburg (1863–1950)
- Ernst II, Duke of Saxe-Altenburg (1871–1955)
- Ernest Augustus II, Duke of Saxe-Weimar-Eisenach (1737–1758)
- Ernest Frederick II, Duke of Saxe-Hildburghausen (1707–1745)
- Ernst Günther II, Duke of Schleswig-Holstein (1863–1921)
- Ernst Ludwig II, Duke of Saxe-Meiningen (1709–1729)
