= Eric I of Brunswick-Grubenhagen =

German nobleman (c. 1383–1427)

Eric I, Duke of Brunswick-Grubenhagen
- Born: c. 1383
- Died: 28 May 1427
- Spouse: Elisabeth of Brunswick-Göttingen
- Issue: Agnes; Anna; Henry III; Ernest II; Albert II; Elisabeth
- House: House of Guelph
- Father: Albert I, Duke of Brunswick-Grubenhagen
- Mother: Agnes I of Brunswick-Lüneburg

Eric I, Duke of Brunswick-Grubenhagen nicknamed the winner (German: Erich I., Herzog von Braunschweig-Grubenhagen; c. 1383 – 28 May 1427), ruled the Principality of Grubenhagen, a part of the Duchy of Brunswick-Lüneburg.

== Life ==
Eric was the only son of the Duke Albert I of Brunswick-Grubenhagen, who died in 1383, and his wife Agnes I, a daughter of Duke Magnus II of Brunswick-Lüneburg. Eric inherited Brunswick-Grubenhagen at a very early age; he stood until 1401 under the guardianship of his uncle, Duke Frederick of Grubenhagen-Osterode. From 1402 they joined ruled the principality and Eric moved his residence to Salzderhelden.

Disputes arose with his cousins Bernard I and Frederick I of Lüneburg, with the city of Brunswick, with his former guardian, with the counts of Schwarzburg and the Landgrave of Thuringia. All these disputes were soon settled again.

In 1406 Eric was captured in a feud with the Lords of Hardenberg in Lindau. He was only released after he gave them a written Urfehde and the city of Osterode am Harz as collateral.

In 1415, Eric declared war on the Counts of Hohenstein, because both sides claimed the county of Bad Lauterberg im Harz and defeated them near the village of Osterhagen. Count Guenther of Hohenstein died during the battle; Counts Henry and Ernest were captured and had to pay 8000 florins and renounce their claims to redeem themselves.

A dispute with the Lords of Bortfeld was settled soon after Eric entered into an alliance against them with the City of Brunswick. A dispute with Landgrave Frederick "the Peaceful" of Thuringia about the city of Einbeck was also settled quickly.

In 1422, the Abbess of Gandersheim Abbey (who happened to be his daughter, Agnes II of Brunswick-Grubenhagen) enfeoffed him with castle and city of Elbingerode. Two years, in 1424, the Abbess of Quedlinburg Abbey (Countess Adelheid of Isenburg), enfeoffed the Dukes of Grubenhagen with Duderstadt, Gieboldehausen and the Golden Mark.

== Marriage and issue ==
Eric was married to Elisabeth, a daughter of Duke Otto I, Duke of Brunswick-Göttingen (referred to as "Otto The Mad" or "Otto The Evil"). They had three sons and five daughters, including:

- Agnes (1406–1439), Abbess of Gandersheim Abbey
- Margaret (1411 – 31 October 1456) married Simon IV, Lord of Lippe in 1426
- Anna (1414–1474) married first to Albert III, Duke of Bavaria and later to Frederick III, Duke of Brunswick-Göttingen-Calenberg
- Henry III (1416–1464), who succeeded his father
- Ernest II (1418–1466), who became provost of the St. Alexandri minster in Einbeck
- Albert II (1419–1485), who succeeded his father
- Elisabeth of Brunswick-Grubenhagen, who married Casimir V, Duke of Pomerania.

== Ancestors ==
Ancestors of Eric I of Brunswick-Grubenhagen

8. Henry I, Duke of Brunswick-Grubenhagen
4. Ernest I, Duke of Brunswick-Grubenhagen
9. Agnes of Meissen
2. Albert I, Duke of Brunswick-Grubenhagen
10. Henry II of Everstein-Polle
5. Adelaide of Everstein-Polle
11. Adelaide of Lippe
1. Eric I, Duke of Brunswick-Grubenhagen
12. Magnus the Pious, Duke of Brunswick-Lüneburg
6. Magnus II, Duke of Brunswick-Lüneburg
13. Sophie of Brandenburg-Stendal
3. Agnes of Brunswick-Lüneburg
14. Bernhard III, Prince of Anhalt-Bernburg
7. Catherine of Anhalt-Bernburg
15. Agnes of Saxe-Wittenberg

== References and sources ==
- Ferdinand Spehr (1877). "Erich I., Herzog von Braunschweig-Grubenhagen" . Allgemeine Deutsche Biographie (in German). Vol. 6. Leipzig: Duncker & Humblot. pp. 201–202.

Eric I of Brunswick-Grubenhagen House of Guelph Born: around 1383 Died: 28 May 1427
Preceded by Albert I	Duke of Brunswick-Lüneburg; Prince of Grubenhagen; 1383–1427	Succeeded by Henry III
