= William of Brunswick (disambiguation) =

William of Brunswick may refer to:

- William of Winchester, Lord of Lüneburg (1184–1213)
- William I, Duke of Brunswick-Lüneburg (c. 1270–1292)
- William II, Duke of Brunswick-Lüneburg (1300–1369)
- William the Victorious, Duke of Brunswick-Lüneburg (c. 1392–1482)
- William IV, Duke of Brunswick-Lüneburg (c. 1425–1503)
- William the Younger, Duke of Brunswick-Lüneburg (1535–1592)
- William, Duke of Brunswick-Grubenhagen (c. 1298–1360)
- William Augustus, Duke of Brunswick-Harburg (1564–1642)
- Augustus William, Duke of Brunswick-Wolfenbüttel (1662–1731)
- August Wilhelm, Duke of Brunswick-Bevern (1715–1781)
- Charles William Ferdinand, Duke of Brunswick-Wolfenbüttel (1735–1806)
- Frederick William, Duke of Brunswick-Wolfenbüttel (1771–1815)
- William, Duke of Brunswick (1806–1884)
