= Otto II of Brunswick-Osterode =

Otto II, Duke of Brunswick-Osterode
- Born: c. 1396
- Died: 1452
- Spouse: Schonetta of Nassau-Weilburg
- House: House of Guelph
- Father: Frederick I, Duke of Brunswick-Osterode
- Mother: Adelaide of Anhalt-Zerbst

Duke Otto II (or Otho) of Brunswick-Osterode (c. 1396–c.1452) was a son of Duke Frederick I of Brunswick-Osterode and his wife, Adelaide of Anhalt-Zerbst, or possibly Elizabeth, heiress of Homburg. He succeeded his father as duke of Brunswick-Osterode in 1421 and ruled jointly with his first cousin once removed Albert II.

Otto was married to Schonetta (or Schonela) (d. 1436), a daughter of Count John I of Nassau-Weilburg. This marriage was childless.

== Ancestors ==
Ancestors of Otto II of Brunswick-Osterode

8. Henry I, Duke of Brunswick-Grubenhagen
4. Ernest I, Duke of Brunswick-Grubenhagen
9. Agnes of Meissen
2. Frederick I, Duke of Brunswick-Osterode
10. Henry II of Everstein=Polle
5. Adelaide of Everstein-Polle
11. Adelaide of Lippe
1. Otto II, Duke of Brunswick-Osterode
12. Albert II, Prince of Anhalt-Zerbst
6. John II, Prince of Anhalt-Zerbst
13. Beatrix of Saxe-Wittenberg
3. Adelaide of Anhalt-Zerbst
14. John I of Henneberg-Schleusingen
7. Elisabeth of Henneberg-Schleusingen
15. Elisabeth of Leuchtenberg

Otto II of Brunswick-Osterode House of Guelph Born: 1396 Died: 1452
Preceded by Frederick I	Duke of Brunswick-Lüneburg; Prince of Osterode; 1421–1452	Succeeded by Albert II
