= Grubenhagen Castle (Einbeck) =

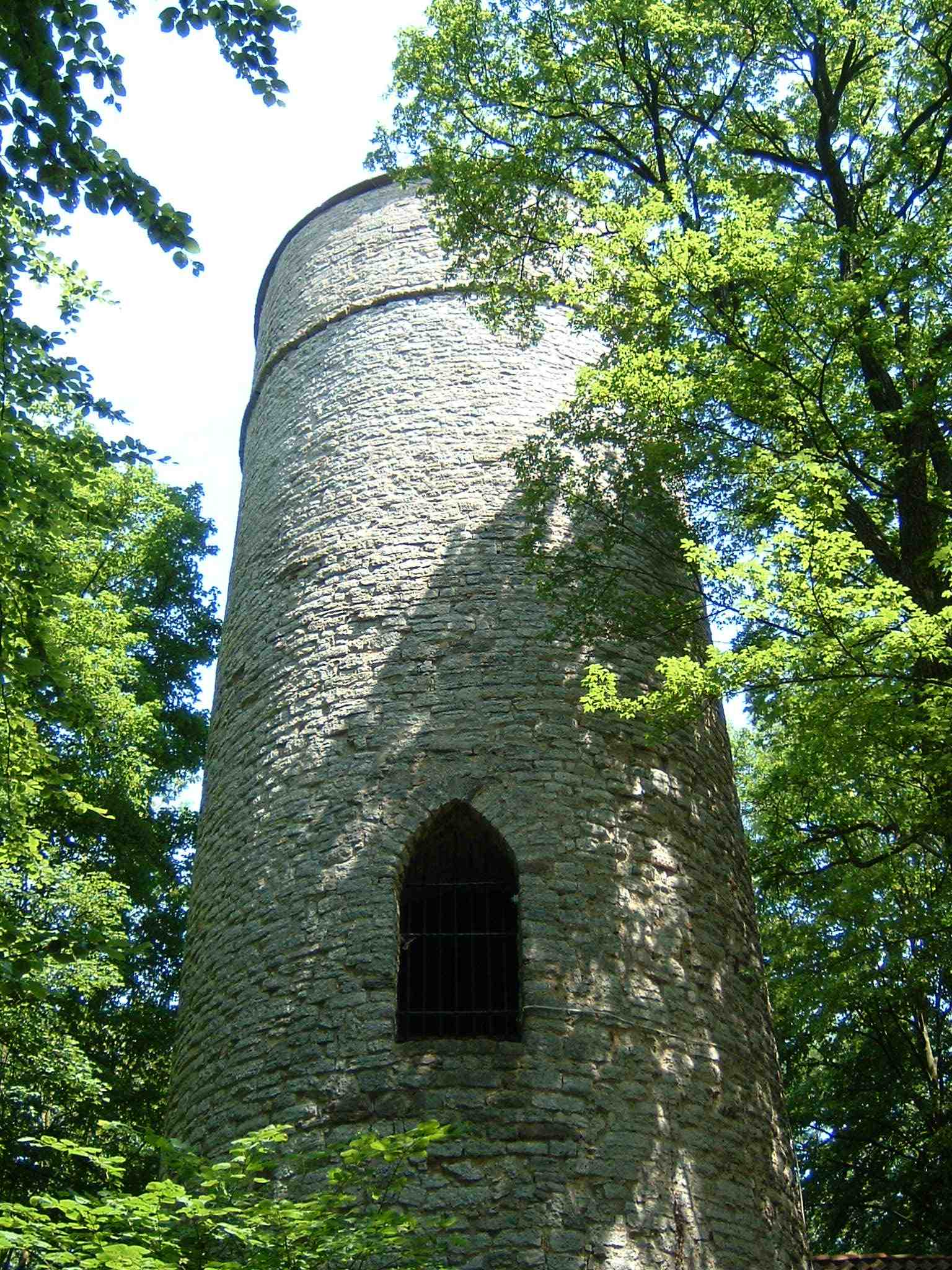
- The round keep (18 m high); the only remaining structure of Grubenhagen Castle

- Location within Lower Saxony Location within Germany
- Alternative names: Burg Grubenhagen

General information
- Type: hill castle
- Classification: keep preserved
- Location: near Einbeck, Northeim district, Lower Saxony
- Coordinates: 51°45′53″N 9°49′02″E
- Completed: 12th/13th century

Height
- Height: 298 m above sea level (NN)

Grubenhagen Castle (German: Burg Grubenhagen) is a ruined medieval castle in North Germany dating to the 13th century. It is not far from the town of Einbeck in southern Lower Saxony.

== Location ==
The ruins are located in the district of Northeim on a 298-metre-high (978 ft) hill summit on the Ahlsburg ridge, south-southwest of Einbeck and east of the Solling hills, between the basin of the River Ilme and the valley of the Leine. The castle may be reached via a narrow forest path from Rotenkirchen, a village south of Einbeck, which is on the northern edge of the ridge and below the castle ruins and not far to the northeast.

== Architecture ==
The hill castle of Grubenhagen was built in the 13th century. Only the round, 18-metre-high (59 ft) bergfried remains today. Attached to its southeastern side is a building from the 19th/20th century. The raised plateau of the inner ward, with its relatively small area, is oval and slightly kidney-shaped. It is about 63 metres long and 32 metres wide. Below it is the outer ward. The site is surrounded on three sides by a double ditch. On the fourth side the terrain drops away steeply, rendering a ditch unnecessary. To the northeast and southwest the remains of the ringwall and revetments have been preserved. A Merian engraving around 1650 shows the castle still with a round keep and a roofless building in front of it with a gable. On the outer ramparts of the main ditch was a defensive wall with a chemin de ronde behind the battlements to the northwest. To the north and northwest the engraving depicts the remains of another defensive walkway with embrasures.

== History ==
The lords of Grubenhagen were the counts of Dassel and the Welfs. It is not clear exactly when the castle was built, but it probably appeared during the reign of Henry the Lion (1129 to 1195). The castle was first mentioned in the records in 1263. At that time the castellans (Burgmannen) in possession of the castle were the ministerialis family of Grubo or Grube, later Grubenhagen. At the end of the 13th century the castle went back to the dukes of Duchy of Brunswick-Lüneburg.

The castle gave its name to the Welf Principality of Grubenhagen founded in 1291 by Henry the Admirable. It was however never really the residence of the principality. It first appears as a "house" of the dukes in the early 15th century. The dukes mainly resided at the castle of Heldenburg not far away and, later, in Herzberg am Harz. The name of the Principality of Grubenhagen first appeared around 1617, its previous name is unknown.

In 1448 Henry III of Brunswick-Grubenhagen had to fortify himself in the castle, after he exposed himself to attack by Landgrave Louis I of Hesse following a raid in the area of Hofgeismar. A siege army deployed in front of the castle with a heavy cannon. The castle could not be taken however. Instead the disappointed attackers devastated the villages of the neighbourhood: Altendorf, Reinsen, Bensen and Rotenkirchen. The last-mentioned was rebuilt in 1520 as a supply depot, residence and administrative seat for the dukes.

In the period that followed Grubenhagen Castle was rarely occupied. The Grubenhagen Line of the House of Welf died out in 1596 and it fell to other Welf lines, who did not use the castle for 200 years. In 1815–16 Duke Adolf Frederick of Cambridge took ownership of the castle from the desmesne of Rotenkirchen. As viceroy of the Kingdom of Hanover the duke had the timber-framed manor house in Rotenkirchen converted by master builder Laves into an elegant hunting lodge. He also had the stables built onto the existing castle tower. From 1861 to 1866 Rotenkirchen was the summer residence of the kings of Hanover.

== The castle today ==
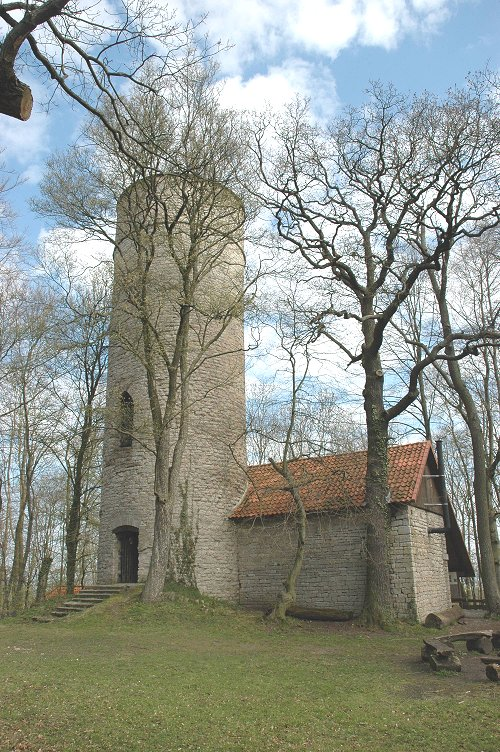
The bergfried and renovated horse stable

Grubenhagen Castle was neglected in the years after the Second World War and fell into further ruin. Even the door to the tower was walled up so that it could no longer be ascended.

Since 1977 a citizens' group, the Grubenhagen Castle Society (Burgverein Grubenhagen), has looked after the castle site. The keep has been renovated with donations and grants and the old horse stable can be used for events. The site is once again a popular destination for day trippers. The tower can be climbed, but the key must be collected beforehand in the village from the castle tower keeper (Burgturmwart).

== Sources ==
- Ernst Andreas Friedrich: Wenn Steine reden könnten. Band III, Landbuch-Verlag, Hannover 1995, ISBN 3-7842-0515-1
