= Frederick I of Brunswick-Osterode =

Duke of Brunswick-Osterode

Frederick I, Duke of Brunswick-Osterode
- Born: c. 1350
- Died: 1421
- Spouse: Adelaide of Anhalt-Zerbst
- Issue: Otto II, Duke of Brunswick-Osterode
- House: House of Guelph
- Father: Ernest I, Duke of Brunswick-Grubenhagen
- Mother: Adelaide of Everstein-Polle

Frederick I, Duke of Brunswick-Osterode (c. 1350-1421) was a son of Duke Ernest I and his wife, Adelaide of Everstein-Polle.

In 1361, he succeeded his father as Count of Osterode.

He married Adelaide (d. before 1421), a daughter of Bernhard V, Prince of Anhalt-Bernburg, and was the father of Otto II (1396-1452), who succeeded him. He may have also married Elizabeth, heiress of Homburg.

Frederick I of Brunswick-Osterode House of Guelph Born: c. 1350 Died: 1421
Preceded by Ernest I	Duke of Brunswick-Lüneburg; Count of Osterode; 1361–1421	Succeeded by Otto II
