= Henry III of Brunswick-Grubenhagen =

Henry III, Duke of Brunswick-Grubenhagen
- Born: 1416
- Died: 1464 (aged 47–48)
- Spouse: Margaret of Sagan
- Issue: Henry IV
- House: House of Guelph
- Father: Eric I, Duke of Brunswick-Grubenhagen
- Mother: Elisabeth of Brunswick-Göttingen

Henry III, Duke of Brunswick-Lüneburg (* 1416 Grubenhagen, † 20 December 1464), of the House of Welf, was a Duke of Brunswick-Lüneburg ruling the ducal Principality of Grubenhagen between 1427 and 1464.

== Life ==
Henry was the eldest son of Eric I, Duke of Brunswick-Grubenhagen and Elizabeth of Brunswick-Göttingen, a daughter of Otto the Bad, Duke of Brunswick-Göttingen. After the death of his father in 1427, he ruled jointly with his younger brothers Ernest II and Albert II.

Until his coming of age in 1437 he was under the guardianship of Duke Otto II of Brunswick-Grubenhagen-Osterode. In the year 1447 a feud broke out between Henry and Louis I, Landgrave of Hesse, who was allied with the Archbishop of Mainz and the dukes of Göttingen. Louis and his allies besieged Grubenhagen Castle, but despite the deployment of two cannon, had to withdraw again. Even an attack on Salzderhelden was unsuccessful. Henry died in 1464 and was interred in the Alexanderstift in Einbeck. He was followed by his son, Henry.

== Family ==
Henry married Margaret of Sagan (1415/25 – 9 May 1497), the daughter of John I, Duke of Sagan, and Scholastika of Saxe-Wittenberg before 27 June 1457. He was her third husband. They had two sons:

- Otto (b. 1458; d. as child)
- Henry IV (1460–1526) married Elisabeth of Saxe-Lauenburg (d after 7 April 1542), daughter of Duke John V of Saxe-Lauenburg.

== Sources ==
- Ludwig Ferdinand Spehr (1880). "Heinrich III., Herzog von Braunschweig-Grubenhagen" . Allgemeine Deutsche Biographie (in German). Vol. 11. Leipzig: Duncker & Humblot. pp. 488–489.

Henry III of Brunswick-Grubenhagen House of Welf Cadet branch of the House of Este Born: 1416 Died: 1464
German nobility
Preceded by Eric I	Duke of Brunswick-Lüneburg; Prince of Grubenhagen joint reign with his brothers Ernest II and Albert II; 1427–1464	Succeeded by Albert II
