= Agnes of Brunswick-Grubenhagen =

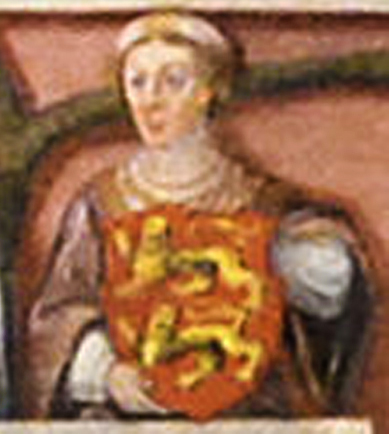
- Portrait from the family tree of the House of Pomerania, 1598
- Born: c. 1406
- Died: 18 November 1439
- Burial: Abbey church in Gandersheim Abbey
- House: House of Guelph
- Father: Eric I, Duke of Brunswick-Grubenhagen
- Mother: Elisabeth of Brunswick-Göttingen

Agnes of Brunswick-Grubenhagen (born: c. 1406; died: 18 November 1439) was, from 1412 to 1439, abbess of Gandersheim Abbey as Agnes II.

== Life ==
She was a daughter of Eric I, Duke of Brunswick-Grubenhagen. She was about six years old when she was elected abbess of Gandersheim Abbey. The pope confirmed Agnes's election while she was a minor, however, he appointed a dean of the Abbey as her guardian and regent. Around 1425, Agnes began to rule without a regent.

She died in 1439 and was buried in the abbey church.

== Guelph inheritance division ==
In connection with the Guelph inheritance division after the Lords of Homburg died out, she transferred the castle and town of Gandersheim and the castles of Seesen and Stauffenburg to Otto II of Brunswick-Göttingen. She transferred Asseburg Castle, Gifhorn, Castle and City of Lüneburg, Greene Castle, Lüthorst, one half of the fief of Homburg, Lauenstein Castle, and the former County of Wernigerode to William I of Brunswick-Wolfenbüttel.
