= Otto III of Brunswick-Lüneburg =

Duke of Brunswick-Lüneburg

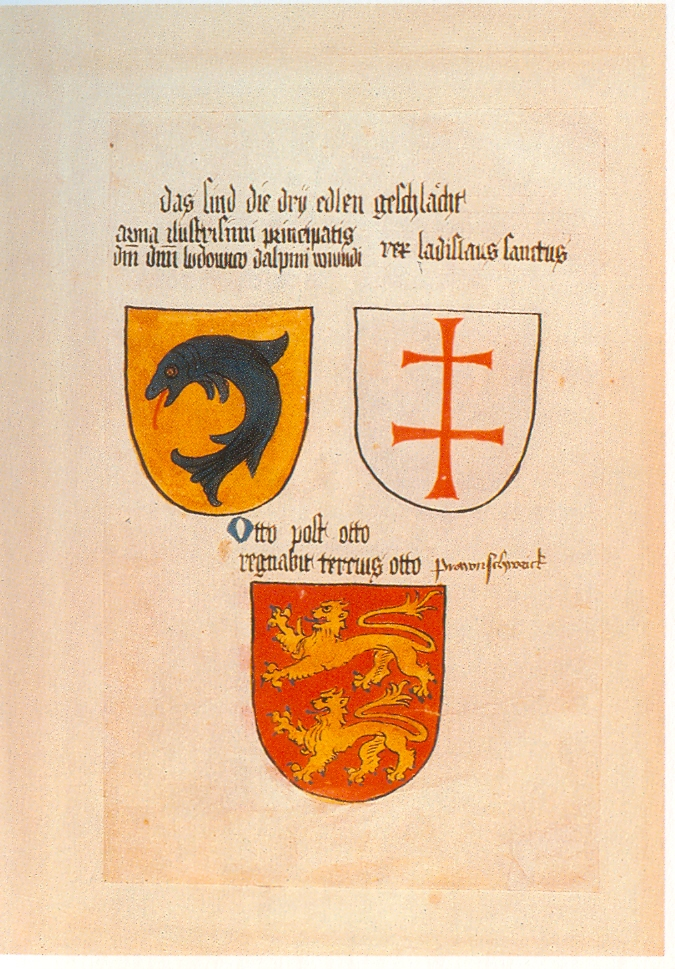
The Brunswick Lions (leopards) as the coat of arms of Otto III (below) in the Ingeram Codex.

Otto III, Duke of Brunswick-Lüneburg (c. 1296 – 19 August 1352) was Prince of Lüneburg from 1330 to 1352.

== Life ==
Otto was born about 1296 as the second son of Otto the Strict and his wife Matilda of Bavaria, and was introduced to the business of government by his father as early as 1314. The stipulation by his father in 1315 that the principality was to be divided after his death between Otto III and his brother, William II, was ignored however by the brothers and they took over joint rule of the undivided state in 1330. The focus of their rule in the early years was the territorial consolidation of the principality. For example, they succeeded in increasing their estate considerably in the area of Gifhorn through the acquisition of the village of Fallersleben and the counties of Papenheim and Wettmarshagen. Another field of attention was their political support of economically growing towns. For example, Lüneburg trade flourished as a result of work to make the Ilmenau navigable between Lüneburg and Uelzen as well as trade agreements between the Lüneburg princes and the dukes of Saxe-Lauenburg. Otto III died on 19 August 1352 without an heir because his only son had already drowned as a child in the River Ilmenau.

== Succession ==
Otto had the following children from his marriage to Matilda of Mecklenburg (1293–1358), daughter of Henry II, Lord of Mecklenburg:

1. Matilda (died 7 September 1357) married Count Otto II of Waldeck
2. Otto, drowned as a child
3. Elisabeth (died 20 February 1386)

== See also ==
- House of Welf
- Duchy of Brunswick-Lüneburg

Otto III of Brunswick-Lüneburg House of Welf Born: c. 1296 Died: 19 August 1352
German nobility
Preceded by Otto II (Otto the Strict)	Duke of Brunswick-Lüneburg; Prince of Lüneburg; 1330–1352	Succeeded by William II
