= Albert I of Brunswick-Grubenhagen =

- Born: c. 1339
- Died: probably 1383
- Burial: St. Alexandri Minster in Einbeck
- Spouse: Agnes of Brunswick-Lüneburg
- Issue: Eric
- House: House of Guelph
- Father: Ernest I, Duke of Brunswick-Grubenhagen
- Mother: Adelheid of Eberstein

Albert I of Brunswick-Grubenhagen (c. 1339 – probably 1383) was a Duke of Brunswick-Lüneburg, and Prince of Brunswick-Grubenhagen-Salzderhelden. He reigned from 1361 until his death.

Albert I was the eldest son of the Duke Ernest the elder of Grubenhagen and his wife, Adelheid of Eberstein. In 1359, his father made him co-ruler. After his father's death in 1361, he ruled the principality alone, except for a few possessions at Osterode and Herzberg, which he ceded to his brother Frederick. He lived alone at Salzderhelden Castle in Einbeck, which is why he was nicknamed "Duke of Salt".

He has been praised as a lover of history and science. Nevertheless, highway robbery flourished during his rule, and he may even have engaged in it himself, which got him into a dispute with his neighbours. On 28 Jun 1361, he shared a letter of tribute from the City of Brunswick with his brother John, but later that year, he got into a feud with Count Otto of Waldeck and his son Henry. In 1362, Albert and John were captured during the battle at Arnoldshausen. They were only released after they had sworn Urfehde.

The territories of Landgrave Frederick III of Thuringia were particularly hard hit by the forays of Albert and his vassals. After several unsuccessful warnings, Frederick III attacked Grubenhagen in 1365 with what was then considered a major army. It has been claimed that the army numbered over eighteen thousand men. They made camp before Einbeck and Salzderhelden. However, after a few months, they had to leave without having accomplished anything. The account of this attack contains the first mention of a gun in Brunswick (diz waz die erste buchse, dy yn dessin landin vernommen wart). The Landgrave devastated towns and villages, and captured and tore down the robber castles of several of Albert's vassals and thereby forced him to sue for peace. Albert soon broke the peace again, the Landgrave devastated his country again, and Albert had to wait in Eisenach until the dispute was arbitrated.

Due to these feuds, Albert was short of money and had to pledge some of his possessions. For example, in 1365 he pledged the bailiwick of Hamelin to Count John of Spigelbert and in 1372, the city of Hamelin itself to Count Otto of Schaumburg and in 1370, to the City Council of Brunswick, his share of the precincts Altewiek and Sack, the judiciary, the Jewish tax and the mills of Brunswick. In 1381, he sold several villages located around Einbeck for 300 Rhenish florins to the Bishop of Hildesheim.

Albert was married with Agnes, daughter of Duke Magnus with the chain of Brunswick. They had one son: Eric I.

Albert probably died in 1383 and was buried in St. Alexandri Minster in Einbeck.

== Ancestors ==
Ancestors of Albert I of Brunswick-Grubenhagen

8. Albert I, Duke of Brunswick-Lüneburg
4. Henry I, Duke of Brunswick-Grubenhagen
9. Adelaide of Montferrat
2. Ernest I, Duke of Brunswick-Grubenhagen
10. Albert II, Margrave of Meissen
5. Agnes of Meissen
11. Margaret of Sicily
1. Albert I, Duke of Brunswick-Grubenhagen
12. Otto of Everstein-Polle
6. Henry II of Everstein-Polle
13. Luitgard of Schladen
3. Adelaide of Everstein-Polle
14. Simon I, Lord of Lippe
7. Adelaide of Lippe
15. Adelaide of Waldeck

== References and sources ==
- Ferdinand Spehr (1875). "Albrecht II, Duke of Brunswick" . Allgemeine Deutsche Biographie (in German). Vol. 1. Leipzig: Duncker & Humblot. pp. 263–264.

Albert I of Brunswick-Grubenhagen House of Welf Cadet branch of the House of Este Born: circa 1339 Died: probably 1383
Preceded by Ernest the elder	Duke of Brunswick-Lüneburg; Prince of Grubenhagen; 1361–1383	Succeeded by Eric I
