= Irene of Brunswick =

Byzantine Empress consort
- Tenure: 1318–1324
- Born: c. 1293
- Died: 16/17 August 1324
- Spouse: Andronikos III Palaiologos
- House: Welf
- Father: Henry I, Duke of Brunswick-Lüneburg
- Mother: Agnes of Meissen
- Religion: Eastern Orthodox, prev. Roman Catholic

Irene of Brunswick, born Adelheid, (Greek: Ειρήνη; c. 1293 – 16/17 August 1324) was the first wife of Andronikos III Palaiologos, and by marriage Byzantine empress, although she died before her husband became senior emperor.

== Biography ==
She was a daughter of Henry I, Duke of Brunswick-Lüneburg and Agnes of Meissen.

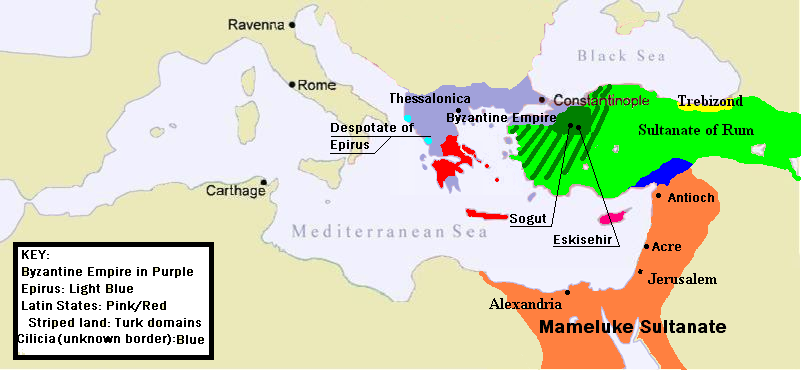
The Mediterranean region in Irene's time

In March, 1318, she married Andronikos Palaiologos. He was the eldest son of Michael IX Palaiologos and Rita of Armenia. Her father-in-law was at the time junior co-emperor with his own father, Andronikos II Palaiologos. She joined the Eastern Orthodox Church with her marriage and took the name Irene. They had a son (June 1320 – February 1322).

She died in Rhaedestos during the civil war between Andronikos II and Andronikos III from 1321 to 1328. Her husband claimed the throne for its duration, making her the empress to a rival emperor. Her husband proceeded to marry Anna of Savoy.

Irene of Brunswick House of Welf Cadet branch of the House of Este Born: c. 1293 Died: 1324
Royal titles
Preceded by Rita of Armenia	Byzantine Empress consort 1318–1324	Succeeded by Anna of Savoy
