= Otto II of Brunswick-Lüneburg =

German Prince of Lüneburg from 1277 (died 1330)

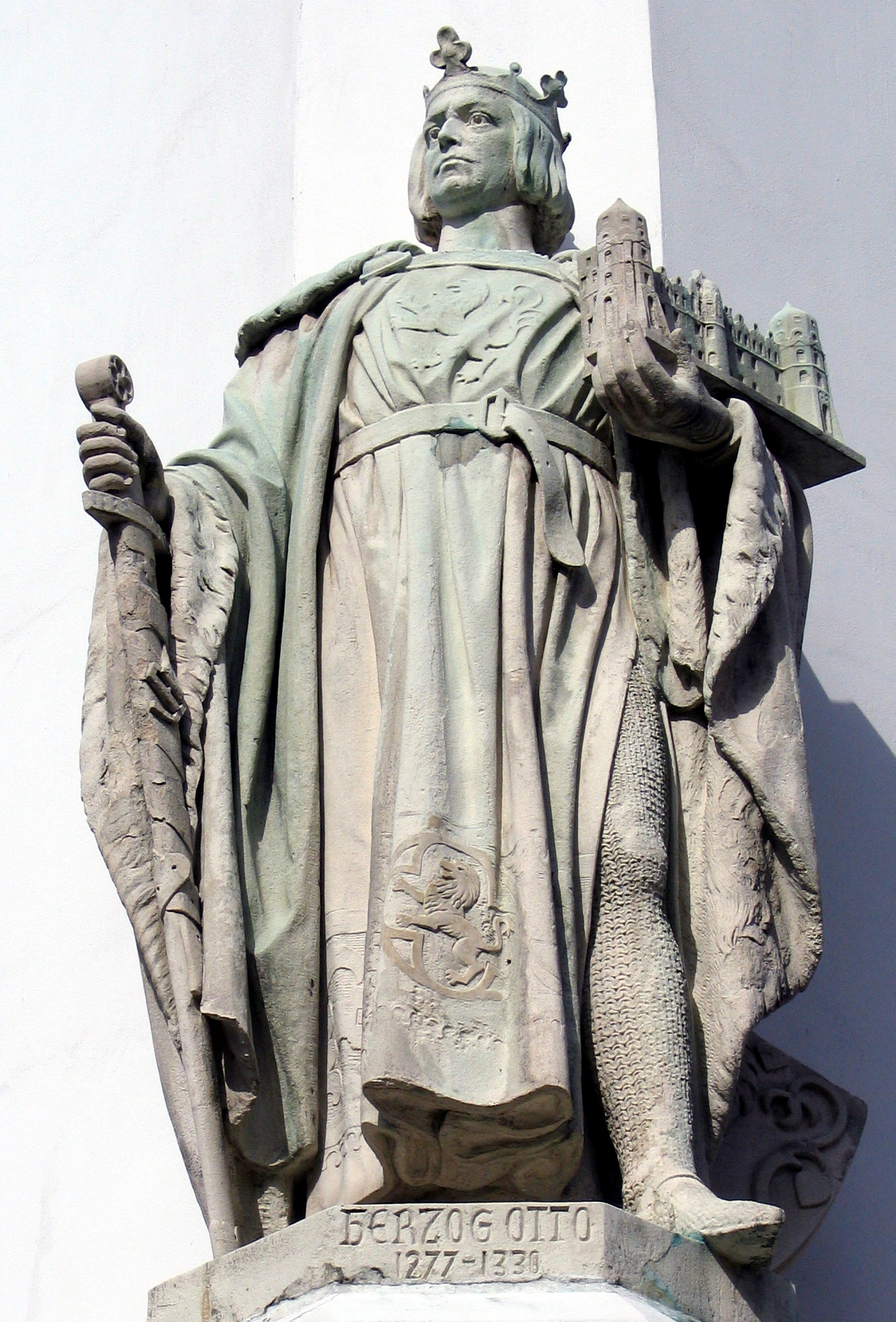
Otto the Strict, sculpture at the Bomann-Museum in Celle

Otto II, Duke of Brunswick and Lüneburg (about 1266 – 10 April 1330), also known as Otto the Strict (Otto der Strenge), came from the House of Welf and was Prince of Lüneburg from 1277 to 1330.

== Life ==
Otto the Strict was born around 1266, the son of John of Lüneburg (d. 1277) and Duchess Liutgard of Holstein. Otto was underage when his father died, so the administration of the duchy went initially to his uncle, Duke Albert (d 1279) and, after his death, to his uncle, Conrad I, Prince-Bishop of Verden. From 1282 Otto ruled in his own right. His rule was marked by several feuds, financed by pledges (Verpfändungen), involving border and property disputes with his neighbours. Otto restricted the rights of the knights and safeguarded public order. The settlements of Harburg, Dahlenburg (1289) and Celle (1292) were given town rights. In 1302 he bought the County of Wölpe for 6,500 silver marks. Following the controversial election of the king in 1313, Otto linked up with his brother-in-law, Louis of Bavaria, from whom he was enfeoffed with an imperial fiefdom in 1315. On 28 November 1315 Otto passed a law of succession that granted the duchy after him to his two sons, Otto and William, jointly.

Otto died on 10 April 1330 and was buried in St. Michael's in Lüneburg, the monastery he had built.

== Successors ==
Otto married Matilda of Bavaria (1275 – 1319) in 1288, the daughter of Duke Louis the Strict of Bavaria (d. 1294). The following children came from this marriage:

- John (d. 1324), Apostolic administrator of the Archdiocese of Bremen
- Otto III (1296–1352), Prince of Lüneburg
- Louis (d. 1346), Bishop of Minden (1324–1346)
- William (d. 1369), Prince of Lüneburg
- Matilda (d. 1316) married after 1308 Nicholas II, Prince of Werle

== Footnotes and references ==
Otto II of Brunswick-Lüneburg House of Welf Born: about 1266 Died: 10 April 1330
German nobility
Preceded by John	Duke of Brunswick-Lüneburg; Prince of Lüneburg; 1277–1330	Succeeded by Otto III and William II
