= Henry IV of Brunswick-Grubenhagen =

Henry IV of Brunswick Grubenhagen
- Born: 1460
- Died: 6 December 1526; Salzderhelden (now part of Einbeck)
- Spouse: Elisabeth of Saxe-Lauenburg
- House: House of Guelph
- Father: Henry III of Brunswick-Grubenhagen
- Mother: Margaret of Żagań

Duke Henry IV of Brunswick Grubenhagen (1460 – 6 December 1526, Salzderhelden, now part of Einbeck) was a member of the Guelph dynasty and was Prince of Brunswick-Grubenhagen.

== Life ==
Henry was the son of Henry III of Brunswick-Grubenhagen and Margaret, a daughter of the Duke Jan I of Żagań and Scholastica of Saxe-Wittenberg. After his father's death in 1464, he succeeded him as Prince of Grubenhagen. Since he was a minor, he was under the guardianship of his uncle, Albert II until he came of age in 1479. After 1479, he divided the principality with Albert. Albert received Osterode Castle and Herzberg Castle; Henry received Heldenburg Castle. They ruled Grubenhagen Castle jointly.

After Albert II died in 1485, Henry became guardian of his underage cousin Philip I. When Henry died childless in 1526, Philip I inherited his territory and thereby reunited all parts of Grubenhagen.

== Marriage ==
Henry married on 26 August 1494 in Einbeck with Elisabeth of Saxe-Lauenburg (died: after 7 April 1542), the daughter of Duke John V of Saxe-Lauenburg and Dorothea of Brandenburg. The marriage remained childless.

== References and sources ==
- Ludwig Ferdinand Spehr (1880). "Heinrich III., Herzog von Braunschweig-Grubenhagen" . Allgemeine Deutsche Biographie (in German). Vol. 11. Leipzig: Duncker & Humblot. pp. 488–489.
