= John, Duke of Brunswick-Lüneburg =

German noble (c. 1242–1277)

John I
- Duke of Brunswick-Lüneburg

Prince of Lüneburg
- Reign: 1269 – 1277
- Born: c. 1242
- Died: 13 December 1277 (aged 34–35)
- Buried: St. Michael's Church, Lüneburg
- Noble family: House of Welf
- Spouse: Liutgard of Holstein
- Issue: Otto II, Duke of Brunswick-Lüneburg
- Father: Otto I, Duke of Brunswick-Lüneburg
- Mother: Matilda of Brandenburg

John (c. 1242 – 13 December 1277), a member of the House of Welf, was Duke of Brunswick-Lüneburg from 1252 until his death. He initially reigned jointly with his brother, Albert the Tall, until the partition of the duchy in 1269, when John became the first ruler of the newly created Principality of Lüneburg.

== Life ==
John's father, Otto the Child, was the first Duke of Brunswick-Lüneburg, having received the Welf allodial possessions in Saxony from the hands of Emperor Frederick II. After his death in 1252, John ruled the duchy jointly with his elder brother Albert. As the brothers could not agree who should govern the duchy, in 1267 they decided to divide their possession. In 1269 John received the right to choose his part. He chose the northern Lüneburg estates with the city of Hanover, forming the Principality of Lüneburg. Albert received the southern estates of Brunswick-Wolfenbüttel with further lands around Calenberg and Göttingen.

John thus founded the Old Line of Lüneburg and his brother the Old Line of Brunswick-Wolfenbüttel. Nevertheless, the two principalities continued to form the Duchy of Brunswick-Lüneburg which remained undivided according to Imperial law and all the princes of the various Welf lines carried the title of Duke of Brunswick-Lüneburg.

In a fierce feud with Count Gunzelin III of Schwerin, John was able to acquire the settlement of Uelzen, whose residents he vested with town privileges in 1270. He tried in vain to gain control of the Lüneburg Saltworks and finally granted the Lüneburg citizens a monopoly to control the salt trade in his principality, mainly along the Old Salt Route to Lübeck and the Baltic Sea.

John died on 13 December 1277 and was buried in the cloister of St. Michael's Church at his Lüneburg residence. His son and heir, Otto II the Strict, was still a minor upon his father's death and remained under the tutelage of his uncles Duke Albert the Tall and Bishop Conrad of Verden until 1282.

== Family and children ==
In 1265 John married Liutgard (d. after 28 February 1289), a daughter of Count Gerhard I of Holstein-Itzehoe. The marriage produced had five children:

1. Otto II the Strict (1266–1330) married in 1288 to Princess Matilda (d. 1319), daughter of the Wittelsbach duke Louis II of Bavaria
2. Matilde (d. after 1308), married in 1291 to Henry I, Prince of Mecklenburg-Güstrow (d. 1291)
3. Elisabeth (d. 1294/1298), married to John II, Count of Oldenburg (d. 1316)
4. Agnes (d. around 1314) married c. 1283 to Count Werner I of Hadmersleben (d. 1292)
5. Helene, married in 1315 to Count Conrad III of Wernigerode

His illegitimate son, Henry of Brunswick (d. 23 August 1324), was a canon in Walsrode.

== Footnotes and references ==
John, Duke of Brunswick-Lüneburg House of Welf Cadet branch of the House of Este Born: about 1242 Died: 13 December 1277
German nobility
Preceded by Otto I	Duke of Brunswick-Lüneburg jointly with Albert I 1252–1269	Partitioning among the rulers
Principality of Lüneburg partitioned from the Duchy of Brunswick-Lüneburg	Duke of Brunswick-Lüneburg; Prince of Lüneburg; 1269–1277	Succeeded by Otto II
