= William, Duke of Brunswick-Grubenhagen =

William of Brunswick-Grubenhagen
- Born: c. 1298
- Died: 1360
- House: House of Welf
- Father: Henry I, Duke of Brunswick-Grubenhagen
- Mother: Agnes of Meissen

William of Brunswick-Grubenhagen (c. 1298 – 1360) was a Prince of Brunswick-Grubenhagen.

== Life ==
He was the third son of Duke Henry I "Mirabilis" of Brunswick-Grubenhagen and his wife Agnes, née Countess of Meissen. After his father's death in 1322, he ruled Grubenhagen jointly with his brothers, Henry II and Ernest I.

William died childless in 1360. After his death, his brother Ernest ruled the principality of Grubenhagen alone.

William, Duke of Brunswick-Grubenhagen House of Welf Cadet branch of the Dukes of Brunswick-Lüneburg Born: circa 1298 Died: 1360
Preceded by Henry I	Duke of Brunswick-Lüneburg; Prince of Grubenhagen; 1322–1360	Succeeded by Ernest I

== References and sources ==
- Paul Zimmermann: Das Haus Braunschweig-Grubenhagen, Wolfenbüttel, 1911
