= John I of Brunswick-Grubenhagen =

Provost of St. Alexandri in Einbeck (died 1367)

John I, Duke of Brunswick-Grubenhagen
- Born: before 1322
- Died: 23 May 1367
- House: House of Guelph
- Father: Henry I, Duke of Brunswick-Lüneburg
- Mother: Agnes of Meissen

John I, Duke of Brunswick-Grubenhagen (before 1322–23 May 1367) was provost of the St. Alexandri Minster in Einbeck.

He was the son of Duke Henry I "the Marvelous" of Brunswick-Grubenhagen and his wife Agnes of Meissen, daughter of Margrave Albert II of Meissen.
