= Agnes of Meissen =

- Duchess of Brunswick-Grubenhagen
- Born: before 1264
- Died: after September 1332
- Spouse: Henry I, Duke of Brunswick-Grubenhagen
- Issue: Elizabeth; Otto; Albert; Adelaide; Facie; Agnes; Henry II; Frederick; Adelheid; Conrad; Mechtild; Ernest I William; Richardis; Margaret; John I
- House: House of Wettin
- Father: Albert II, Margrave of Meissen
- Mother: Margaret of Sicily

Agnes of Meissen (born before 1264 – died after September 1332) was a noblewoman, the daughter of Albert II, Margrave of Meissen and his wife Margaret of Sicily.

Agnes was married with Henry I "the Marvelous" of Brunswick-Grubenhagen, in 1282. They had 16 children:

- Elizabeth (born c. 1282), married Frederick, Count of Beichlingen
- Otto (born c. 1283, died in or before 1309)
- Albert (born c. 1284, died after 1341), joined the Teutonic Order
- Adelaide (1285–1320), married King Henry I of Bohemia
- Facie (daughter; born c. 1286, died before or in 1312)
- Agnes, Abbess of Osterode
- Henry II, Duke of Brunswick-Lüneburg
- Frederick
- Adelheid of Brunswick, married to Andronikos III Palaiologos
- Conrad (c. 1294 – c. 1320)
- Mechtild (c. 1295 – 14 March 1344), married John II of Werle
- Ernest I, Duke of Brunswick-Grubenhagen
- William, Duke of Brunswick-Grubenhagen
- Richardis, Abbess of Osterode
- Margaret (born c. 1300, died in or after 1312)
- John I, Duke of Brunswick-Grubenhagen
