= Ernest I of Brunswick-Grubenhagen =

Prince of Brunswick-Grubenhagen

- Born: c. 1297
- Died: 9 March 1361
- Spouse: Adelheid of Everstein-Polle
- Issue: Albert I Adelheid; Agnes; Anna; Frederick I
- House: House of Guelph
- Father: Henry I, Duke of Brunswick-Grubenhagen
- Mother: Countess Agnes of Meissen

Ernest I of Brunswick-Grubenhagen (German: Ernst I., Fürst von Braunschweig-Grubenhagen; c. 1297 – 9 March 1361) was Prince of Brunswick-Grubenhagen.

== Life ==
He was the son of Henry I, the Admirable and his wife Agnes, née Countess of Meissen. Henry the Admirable founded the Principality of Grubenhagen in 1291, after the Guelph princes had divided their inheritance. Ernest originally intended to follow a spiritual career, but after his father's death, he and his brothers Henry II and William jointly ruled the principality.

Grubenhagen was rather smaller than the other Guelph principalities. Because Henry the Admirable had many children (eight sons and eight daughters), it was difficult to supply all the descendants in style. His eldest son Henry II could therefore not take the undivided sovereignty over the principality. In 1324, Henry concluded an extensive pact with his brothers Ernest and William under which the territory should be governed jointly, but shortly afterwards the principality was divided. Ernest received the area around Einbeck, Grubenhagen Castle and Osterode. The towns of Duderstadt, Osterode and Einbeck were ruled jointly. In 1359 he made his son Albert I co-regent. His older brother Henry died 1351 and his sons lingered abroad and died without issue, so after the death of his childless younger brother William in 1360, Ernest ruled the entire principality of Grubenhagen. After his death, on 9 March 1361, he was succeeded by his son Albert I.

== Marriage and issue ==
Ernst married in 1322 Adelheid (or Agnes) of Everstein-Polle (died after 1373), daughter of Count Henry II of Eberstein. The marriage produced six children.

- Otto (or Otho) (born 1337, died young)
- Albert I (born: c. 1339; died 1383)

married in 1372 Agnes of Brunswick (d. 1410), daughter of Duke Magnus II of Brunswick.

- Agnes (born: c. 1342; died 1394)

married in 1362 Count Ulrich of Hohnstein

- Ernest II (born: c. 1346; died 1400/02), abbot of Corvey (1369–1371)
- Frederick (born: c. 1350; died 1421)

married Adelheid of Anhalt

- Anna (born: c. 1360; died 1437), Abbess in Osterode

Ernest I of Brunswick-Grubenhagen House of Guelph Born: 1297 Died: 9 March 1361
Preceded by Henry I, the Admirable	Duke of Brunswick-Lüneburg; Prince of Grubenhagen; 1322–1361	Succeeded by Albert I
